= Eurozone crisis =

Multi-year debt crisis in multiple EU countries, 2009–2010

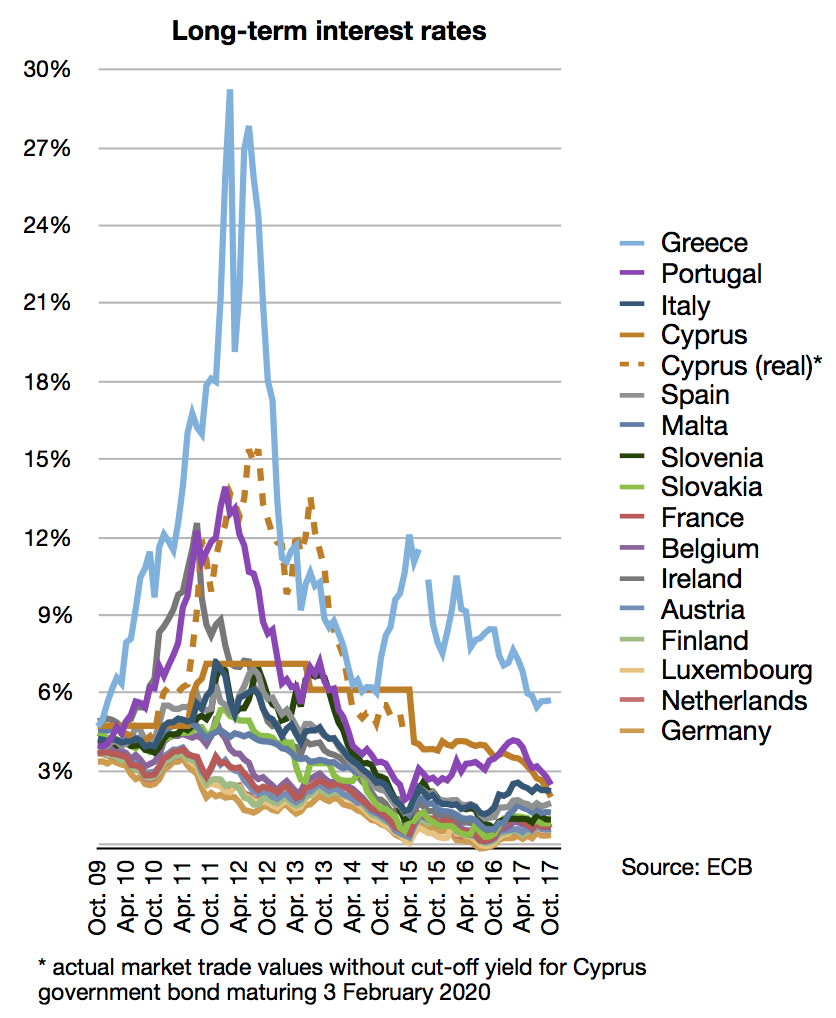
Long-term interest rates (secondary market yields of government bonds with maturities of close to ten years) of all eurozone member states (except Estonia, Latvia, and Lithuania). A yield being more than 4% points higher compared to the lowest comparable yield among the eurozone states, i.e. yields above 6% in September 2011, indicates that financial institutions have serious doubts about credit-worthiness of the state.

The eurozone crisis, also known as the euro area crisis, European debt crisis, or European sovereign debt crisis, was a debt crisis and financial crisis in the European Union (EU) that occurred between 2009 and 2018.

The eurozone member states of Greece, Portugal, Ireland, and Cyprus could no longer adequately manage their debt (ie. unable to repay or refinance their government debt) and could not bail out their national banks. Assistance was needed from other eurozone countries, the European Central Bank (ECB), and the International Monetary Fund (IMF) to address the crisis.

The crisis included the Greek government-debt crisis, the 2008–2014 Spanish financial crisis, the 2010–2014 Portuguese financial crisis, the post-2008 Irish banking crisis and the post-2008 Irish economic downturn, as well as the 2012–2013 Cypriot financial crisis. The crisis contributed to changes in leadership in Greece, Ireland, France, Italy, Portugal, Spain, Slovenia, Slovakia, Belgium, and the Netherlands as well as in the United Kingdom. It also led to austerity, increases in unemployment rates to as high as 27% in Greece and Spain, and increases in poverty levels and income inequality in the affected countries.

Causes of the euro area crisis included a weak economy of the European Union after the 2008 financial crisis and the Great Recession, the sudden stop of the flow of foreign capital into countries that had substantial current account deficits and were dependent on foreign lending. The crisis was worsened by the inability of states to resort to devaluation (reductions in the value of the national currency) due to having the euro as a shared currency. Debt accumulation in some eurozone members was in part due to differences in macroeconomics among eurozone member states prior to the adoption of the euro. It also involved a process of cross-border financial contagion. The European Central Bank (ECB) adopted an interest rate that incentivized investors in Northern eurozone members to lend to the South, whereas the South was incentivized to borrow because interest rates were very low. Over time, this led to the accumulation of deficits in the South, primarily by private economic actors. A lack of fiscal policy coordination among eurozone member states contributed to imbalanced capital flows in the eurozone, while a lack of financial regulatory centralization or harmonization among eurozone member states, coupled with a lack of credible commitments to provide bailouts to banks, incentivized risky financial transactions by banks. The detailed causes of the crisis varied from country to country. In several EU countries, private debts arising from real-estate bubbles were transferred to sovereign debt as a result of banking system bailouts and government responses to slowing economies post-bubble. European banks own a significant amount of sovereign debt, such that concerns regarding the solvency of banking systems or sovereigns are negatively reinforcing.

The onset of crisis was in late 2009 when the Greek government disclosed that its budget deficits were far higher than previously thought. Greece called for external help in early 2010, receiving an EU–IMF bailout package in May 2010. European nations implemented a series of financial support measures such as the European Financial Stability Facility (EFSF) in early 2010 and the European Stability Mechanism (ESM) in late 2010. The ECB also contributed to solve the crisis by lowering interest rates and providing cheap loans of more than one trillion euros in order to maintain money flows between European banks. On 6 September 2012, the ECB calmed financial markets by announcing free unlimited support for all eurozone countries involved in a sovereign state bailout/precautionary programme from EFSF/ESM, through some yield lowering Outright Monetary Transactions (OMT). Ireland and Portugal received EU-IMF bailouts In November 2010 and May 2011, respectively. In March 2012, Greece received its second bailout. Cyprus also received rescue packages in June 2012.

Return to economic growth and improved structural deficits enabled Ireland and Portugal to exit their bailout programmes in July 2014. Greece and Cyprus both managed to partly regain market access in 2014. Spain never officially received a bailout programme. Its rescue package from the ESM was earmarked for a bank recapitalisation fund and did not include financial support for the government itself. In June 2026, 16 years after the start of the crisis, the European Commission officially removed Greece, the country most affected by the Euro area crisis, from the list of countries with macroeconomic imbalances.

== Causes ==
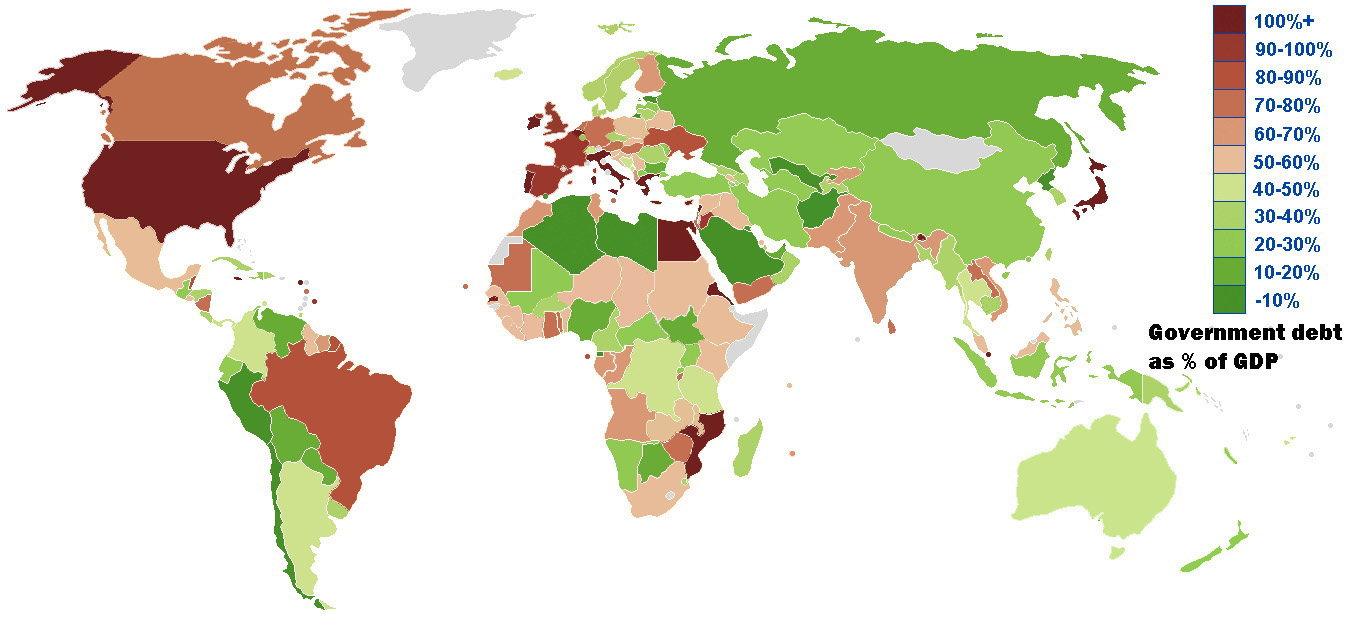
Total (gross) government debt around the world as a percent of GDP by IMF (2012)

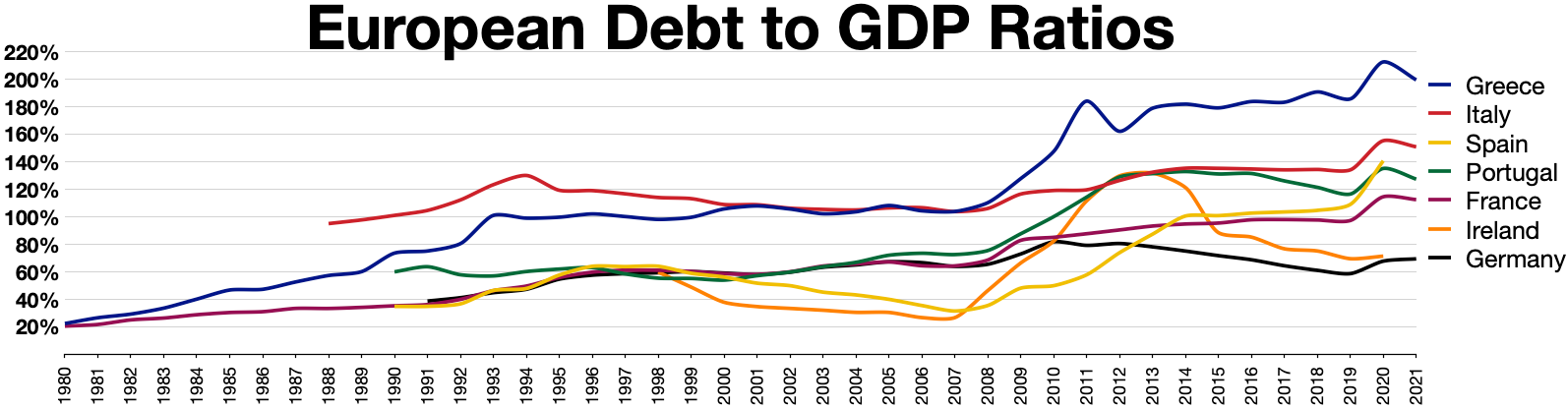
European debt to GDP ratios Greece Italy Spain Portugal France Ireland Germany

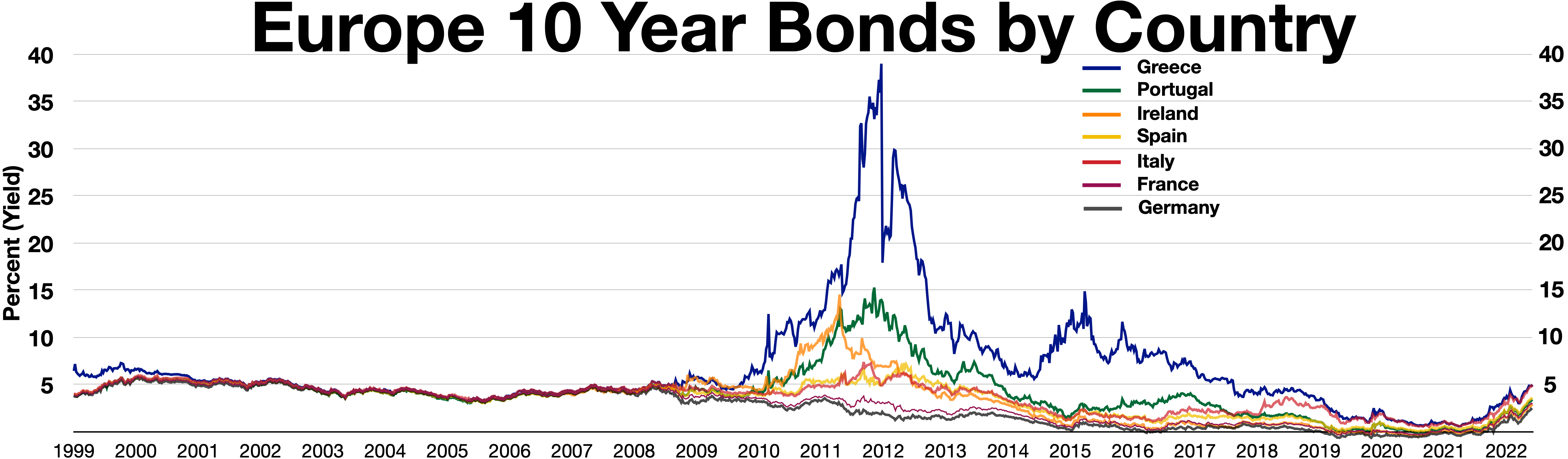
European 10 year bonds. Before the Great Recession in Europe bonds floated together in parity despite different risk profiles between countries. Greece 10 year bond Portugal 10 year bond Ireland 10 year bond Spain 10 year bond Italy 10 year bond France 10 year bond Germany 10 year bond

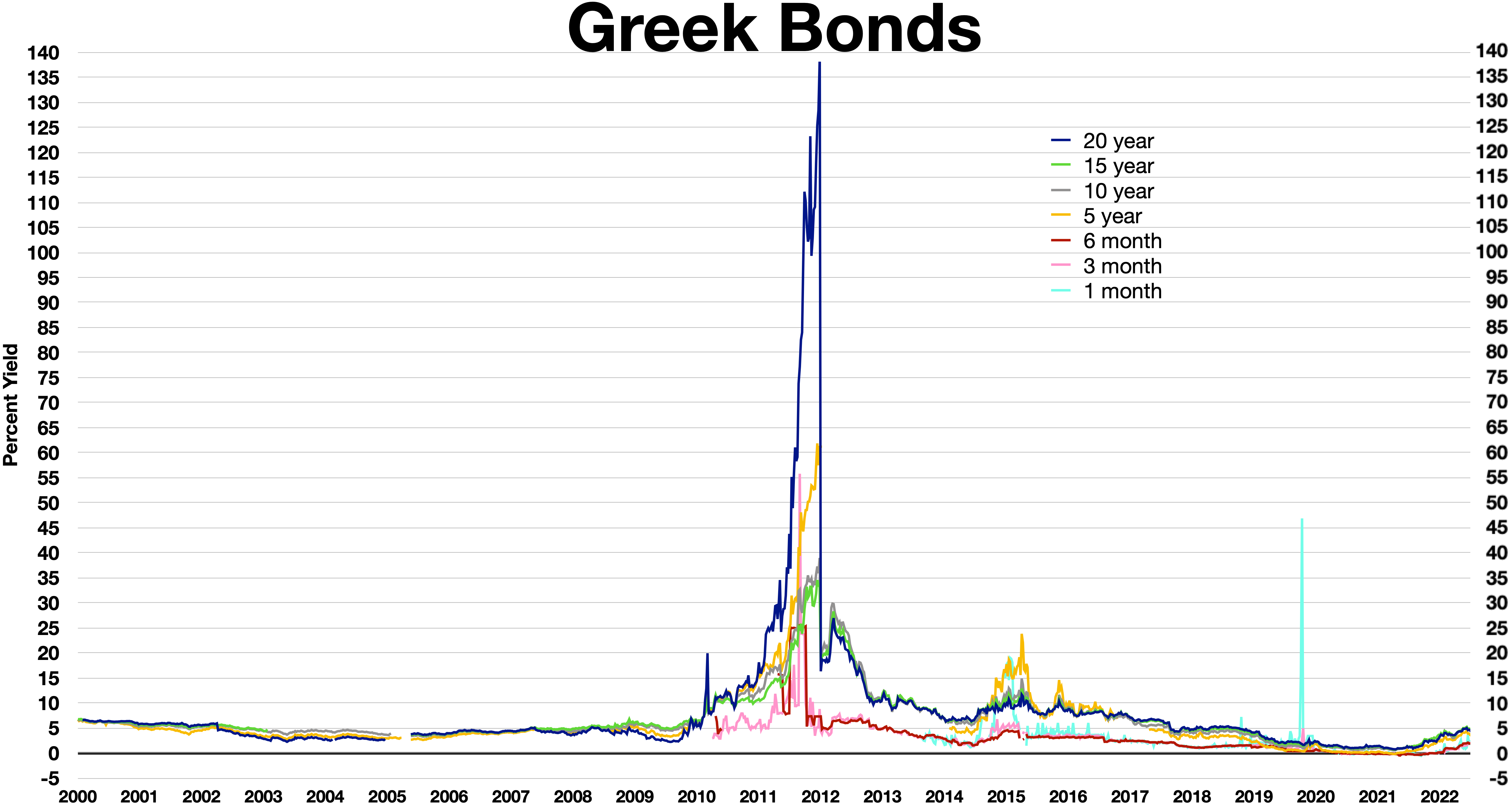
Greek bonds 20 year 15 year 10 year 5 year 1 year 3 month 1 month

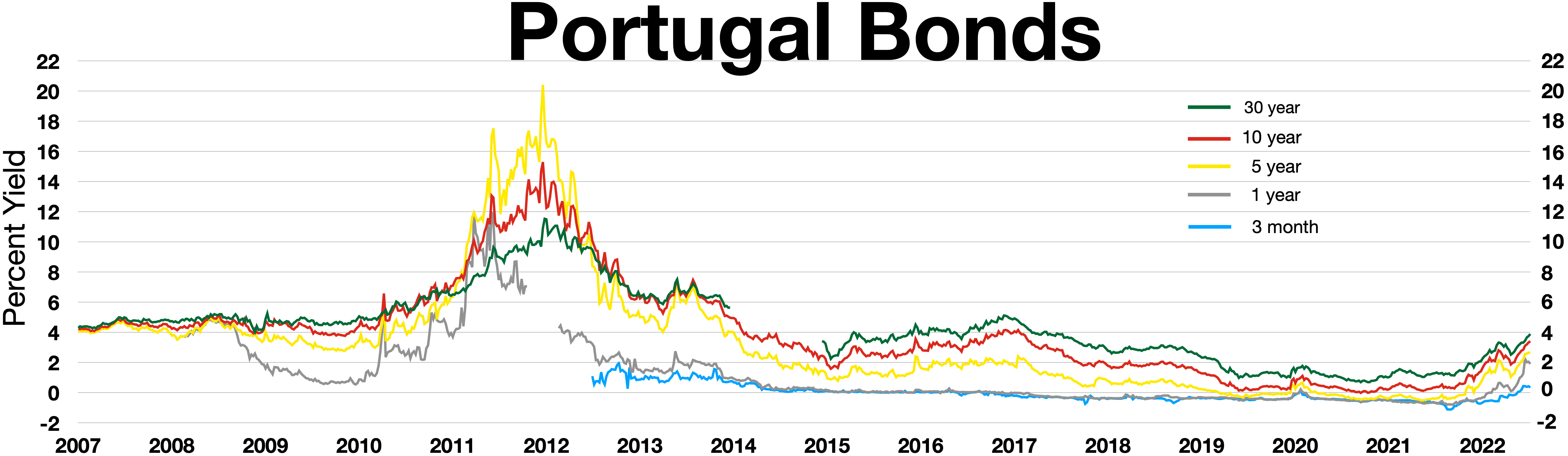
Portugal bonds during Portuguese financial crisis 30 year bond 10 year bond 5 year bond 1 year bond 3 month bond

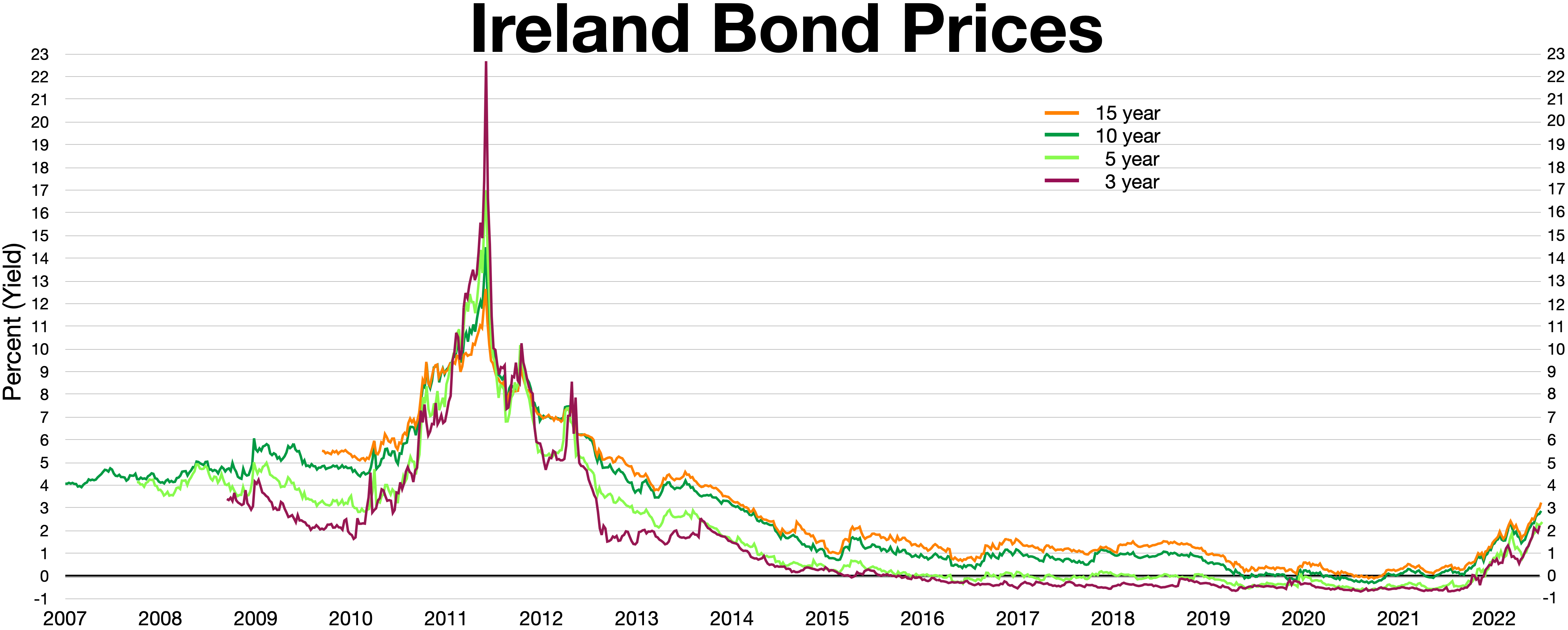
Ireland bond prices, Inverted yield curve in 2011 15 year bond 10 year bond 5 year bond 3 year bond

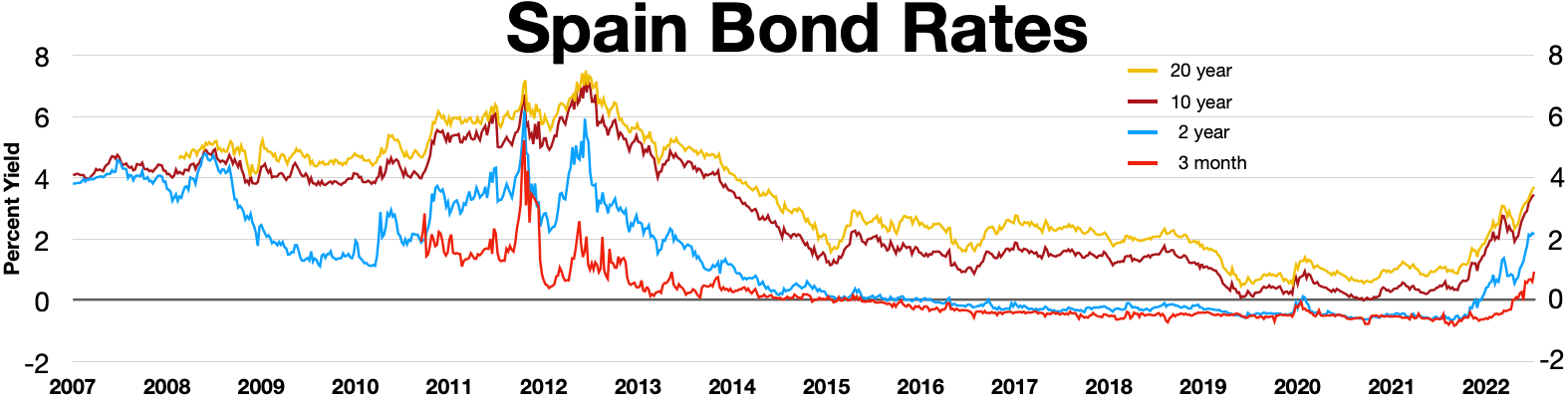
Spain bond rates during Spanish financial crisis 20 year bond 10 year bond 2 year bond 3 month bond

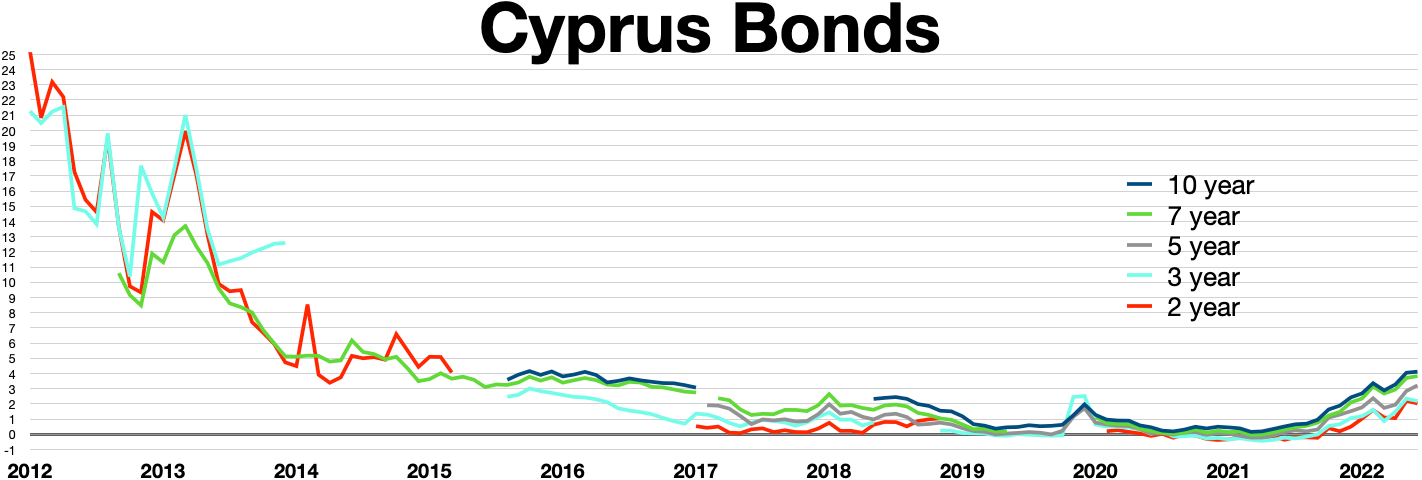
Cyprus bonds 10 year 7 year 5 year 3 year 2 year

The eurozone crisis resulted from the structural problem of the eurozone and a combination of complex factors. There is a consensus that the root of the eurozone crisis lay in a balance-of-payments crisis (a sudden stop of foreign capital into countries that were dependent on foreign lending), and that this crisis was worsened by the fact that states could not resort to devaluation (reductions in the value of the national currency to make exports more competitive in foreign markets). Other important factors include the globalisation of finance; easy credit conditions during the 2002–2008 period that encouraged high-risk lending and borrowing practices; the 2008 financial crisis; international trade imbalances; real estate bubbles that have since burst; the Great Recession of 2008–2012; fiscal policy choices related to government revenues and expenses; and approaches used by states to bail out troubled banking industries and private bondholders, assuming private debt burdens or socializing losses.

Macroeconomic divergence among eurozone member states led to imbalanced capital flows between the member states. Despite different macroeconomic conditions, the European Central Bank could only adopt one interest rate, choosing one that meant that real interest rates in Germany were high (relative to inflation) and low in Southern eurozone member states. This incentivized investors in Germany to lend to the South, whereas the South was incentivized to borrow (because interest rates were very low). Over time, this led to the accumulation of deficits in the South, primarily by private economic actors.

Comparative political economy explains the fundamental roots of the European crisis in varieties of national institutional structures of member countries (north vs. south), which conditioned their asymmetric development trends over time and made the union susceptible to external shocks. Imperfections in the Eurozone's governance construction to react effectively exacerbated macroeconomic divergence.

Eurozone member states could have alleviated the imbalances in capital flows and debt accumulation in the South by coordinating national fiscal policies. Germany could have adopted more expansionary fiscal policies (to boost domestic demand and reduce the outflow of capital) and Southern eurozone member states could have adopted more restrictive fiscal policies (to curtail domestic demand and reduce borrowing from the North). Per the requirements of the 1992 Maastricht Treaty, governments pledged to limit their deficit spending and debt levels. However, some of the signatories, including Germany and France, failed to stay within the confines of the Maastricht criteria and turned to securitising future government revenues to reduce their debts and/or deficits, sidestepping best practice and ignoring international standards. This allowed the sovereigns to mask their deficit and debt levels through a combination of techniques, including inconsistent accounting, off-balance-sheet transactions, and the use of complex currency and credit derivatives structures. From late 2009 on, after Greece's newly elected, PASOK government stopped masking its true indebtedness and budget deficit, fears of sovereign defaults in certain European states developed in the public, and the government debt of several states was downgraded. The crisis subsequently spread to Ireland and Portugal, while raising concerns about Italy, Spain, and the European banking system, and more fundamental imbalances within the eurozone. The under-reporting was exposed through a revision of the forecast for the 2009 budget deficit from "6–8%" of GDP (no greater than 3% of GDP was a rule of the Maastricht Treaty) to 12.7%, almost immediately after PASOK won the October 2009 Greek national elections. Large upwards revision of budget deficit forecasts were not limited to Greece: for example, in the United States forecast for the 2009 budget deficit was raised from $407 billion projected in the 2009 fiscal year budget, to $1.4 trillion, while in the United Kingdom there was a final forecast more than 4 times higher than the original. In Greece, the low ("6–8%") forecast was reported until very late in the year (September 2009), clearly not corresponding to the actual situation.

Fragmented financial regulation contributed to irresponsible lending in the years prior to the crisis. In the eurozone, each country had its own financial regulations, which allowed financial institutions to exploit gaps in monitoring and regulatory responsibility to resort to loans that were high-yield but very risky. Harmonization or centralization in financial regulations could have alleviated the problem of risky loans. Another factor that incentivized risky financial transaction was that national governments could not credibly commit not to bailout financial institutions who had undertaken risky loans, thus causing a moral hazard problem. The Eurozone can incentivize overborrowing through a tragedy of the commons.

== Evolution of the crisis ==
Public debt in 2009 (source: European Commission) Legend: < 20%, < 40%, < 60% to Maastricht criteria; > 80%, > 60% to Maastricht criteria; no data/not in the EU.

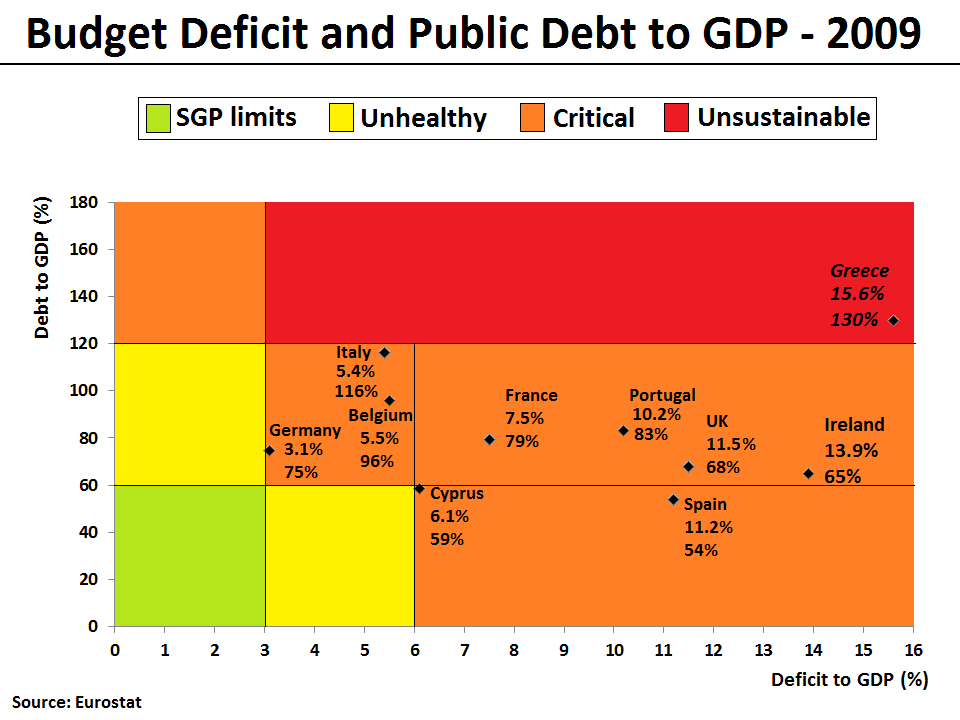
The 2009 annual budget deficit and public debt both relative to GDP, for selected European countries. In the eurozone, the following number of countries were: SGP-limit compliant (3), Unhealthy (1), Critical (12), and Unsustainable (1).

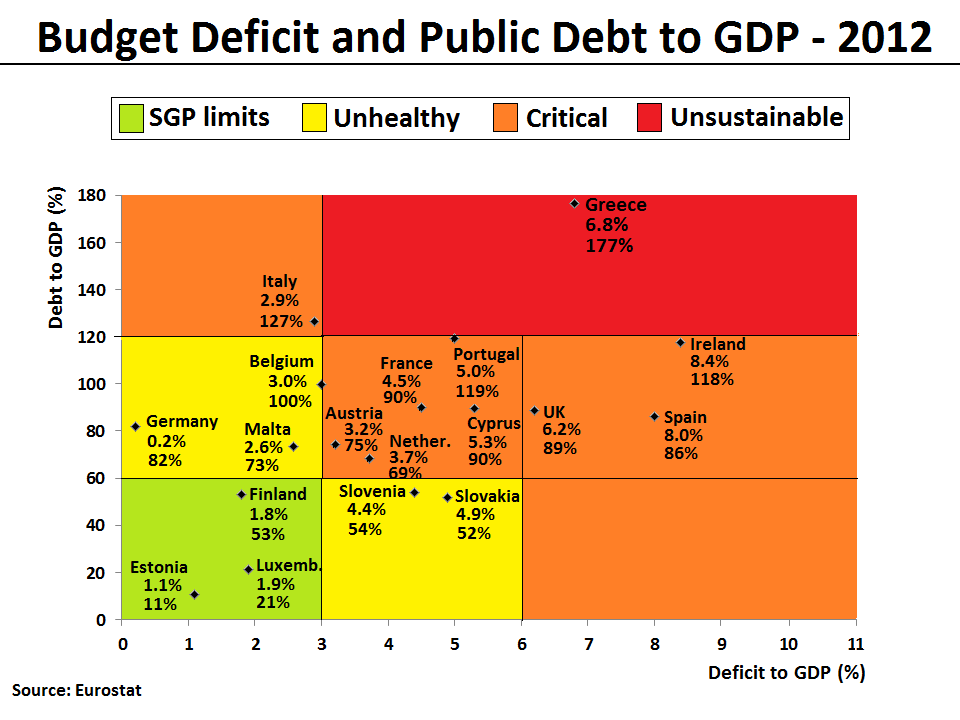
The 2012 annual budget deficit and public debt both relative to GDP, for all countries and UK. In the eurozone, the following number of countries were: SGP-limit compliant (3), Unhealthy (5), Critical (8), and Unsustainable (1).

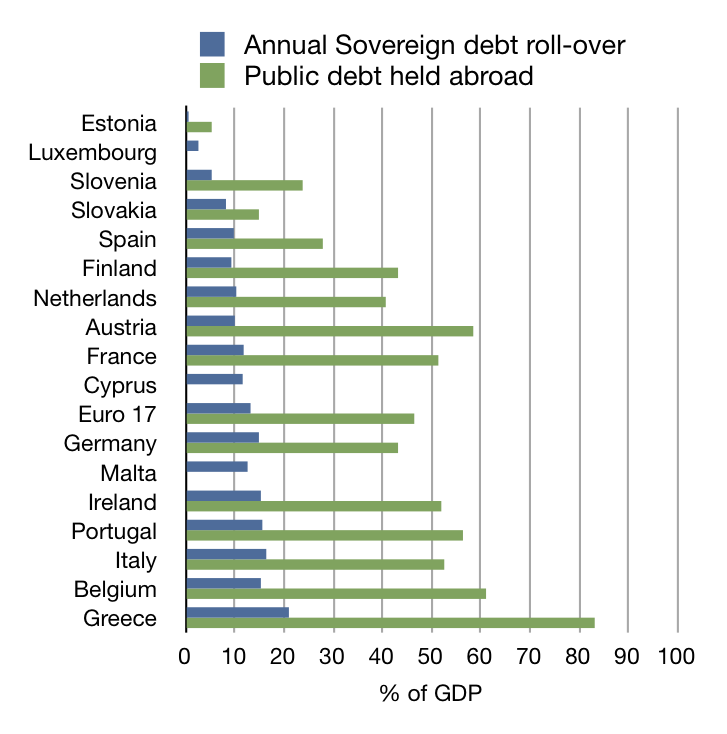
Debt profile of eurozone countries

Change in national debt and deficit levels since 1980

The crisis began in late 2009 just after the Great Recession, and was characterized by an environment of overly high government structural deficits and accelerating debt levels. When, as a negative repercussion of the Great Recession, the relatively fragile banking sector had suffered large capital losses, most states in Europe had to bail out several of their most affected banks with some supporting recapitalization loans, because of the strong linkage between their survival and the financial stability of the economy. As of January 2009, a group of 10 central and eastern European banks had already asked for a bailout. At the time, the European Commission released a forecast of a 1.8% decline in EU economic output for 2009, making the outlook for the banks even worse. The many public funded bank recapitalizations were one reason behind the sharply deteriorated debt-to-GDP ratios experienced by several European governments in the wake of the Great Recession. The main root causes for the four sovereign debt crises erupting in Europe were reportedly a mix of: weak actual and potential growth; competitive weakness; liquidation of banks and sovereigns; large pre-existing debt-to-GDP ratios; and considerable liability stocks (government, private, and non-private sector).

In the first few weeks of 2010, there was renewed anxiety about excessive national debt, with lenders demanding ever-higher interest rates from several countries with higher debt levels, deficits, and current account deficits. This in turn made it difficult for four out of eighteen eurozone governments to finance further budget deficits and repay or refinance existing government debt, particularly when economic growth rates were low, and when a high percentage of debt was in the hands of foreign creditors, as in the case of Greece and Portugal.

The states that were adversely affected by the crisis faced a strong rise in interest rate spreads for government bonds as a result of investor concerns about their future debt sustainability. Four eurozone states had to be rescued by sovereign bailout programs, which were provided jointly by the International Monetary Fund and the European Commission, with additional support at the technical level from the European Central Bank. Together these three international organisations representing the bailout creditors became nicknamed "the Troika".

To fight the crisis some governments have focused on raising taxes and lowering expenditures, which contributed to social unrest and significant debate among economists, many of whom advocate greater deficits when economies are struggling. Especially in countries where budget deficits and sovereign debts have increased sharply, a crisis of confidence has emerged with the widening of bond yield spreads and risk insurance on CDS between these countries and other EU member states, most importantly Germany. By the end of 2011, Germany was estimated to have made more than €9 billion out of the crisis as investors flocked to safer but near zero interest rate German federal government bonds (bunds). By July 2012 also the Netherlands, Austria, and Finland benefited from zero or negative interest rates. Looking at short-term government bonds with a maturity of less than one year the list of beneficiaries also includes Belgium and France. While Switzerland (and Denmark) equally benefited from lower interest rates, the crisis also harmed its export sector due to a substantial influx of foreign capital and the resulting rise of the Swiss franc. In September 2011 the Swiss National Bank surprised currency traders by pledging that "it will no longer tolerate a euro-franc exchange rate below the minimum rate of 1.20 francs", effectively weakening the Swiss franc. This is the biggest Swiss intervention since 1978.

Despite sovereign debt having risen substantially in only a few eurozone countries, with the three most affected countries Greece, Ireland and Portugal collectively only accounting for 6% of the eurozone's gross domestic product (GDP), it became a perceived problem for the area as a whole, leading to concerns about further contagion of other European countries and a possible break-up of the eurozone. In total, the debt crisis forced five out of 17 eurozone countries to seek help from other nations by the end of 2012.

In mid-2012, due to successful fiscal consolidation and implementation of structural reforms in the countries being most at risk and various policy measures taken by EU leaders and the ECB (see below), financial stability in the eurozone improved significantly and interest rates fell steadily. This also greatly diminished contagion risk for other eurozone countries. As of October 2012 only 3 out of 17 eurozone countries, namely Greece, Portugal, and Cyprus still battled with long-term interest rates above 6%. By early January 2013, successful sovereign debt auctions across the eurozone but most importantly in Ireland, Spain, and Portugal, showed investors' confidence in the ECB backstop. As of May 2014 only two countries (Greece and Cyprus) still needed help from third parties.

== Crisis by country ==
=== Greece ===
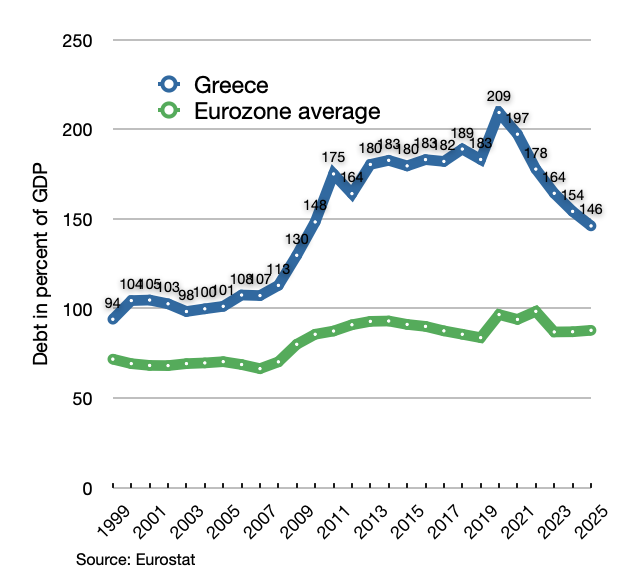
Debt of Greece compared to eurozone average since 1999

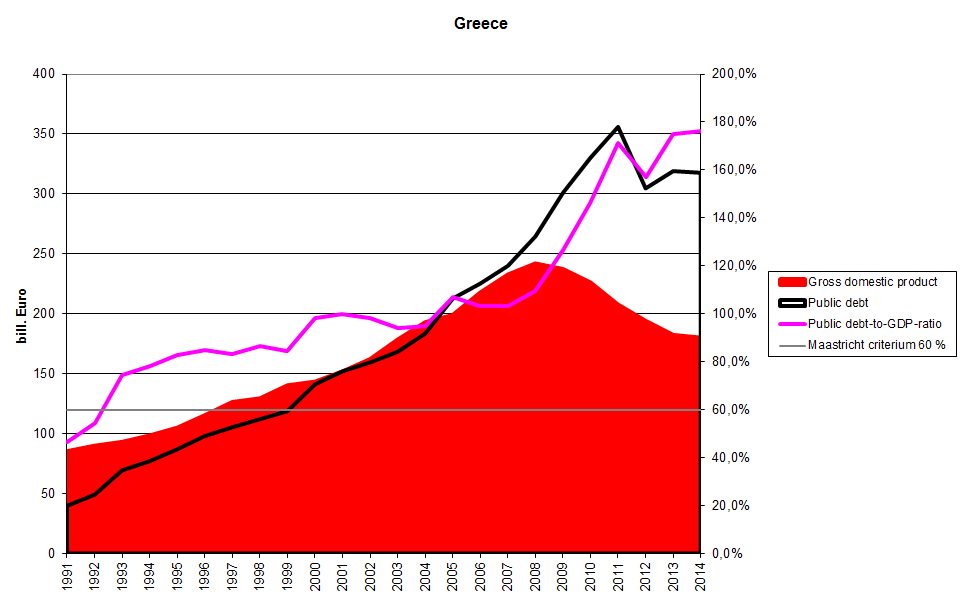
Greece's public debt, gross domestic product (GDP), and public debt-to-GDP ratio. Graph based on "ameco" data from the European Commission.

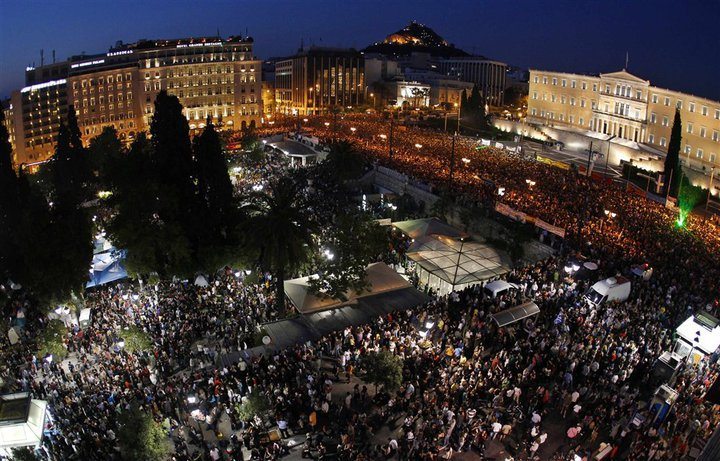
100,000 people protest against austerity measures in front of parliament building in Athens, 29 May 2011

The Greek economy had fared well for much of the 20th century, with high growth rates and low public debt. By 2007 (i.e., before the 2008 financial crisis), it was still one of the fastest growing in the eurozone, with a public debt-to-GDP that did not exceed 104%, but it was associated with a large structural deficit. As the world economy was affected by the 2008 financial crisis, Greece was hit especially hard because its main industries—shipping and tourism—were especially sensitive to changes in the business cycle. The government spent heavily to keep the economy functioning and the country's debt increased accordingly.

The Greek crisis was triggered by the turmoil of the Great Recession, which led the budget deficits of several Western nations to reach or exceed 10% of GDP. In the case of Greece, the high budget deficit (which, after several corrections, had been allowed to reach 10.2% and 15.1% of GDP in 2008 and 2009, respectively) was coupled with a high public debt to GDP ratio (which, until then, was relatively stable for several years, at just above 100% of GDP, as calculated after all corrections). Thus, the country appeared to lose control of its public debt to GDP ratio, which already reached 127% of GDP in 2009. In contrast, Italy was able (despite the crisis) to keep its 2009 budget deficit at 5.1% of GDP, which was crucial, given that it had a public debt to GDP ratio comparable to Greece's. In addition, being a member of the Eurozone, Greece had essentially no autonomous monetary policy flexibility.

Finally, there was an effect of controversies about Greek statistics (due the aforementioned drastic budget deficit revisions which led to an increase in the calculated value of the Greek public debt by about 10%, a public debt-to-GDP ratio of about 100% until 2007), while there have been arguments about a possible effect of media reports. Consequently, Greece was "punished" by the markets which increased borrowing rates, making it impossible for the country to finance its debt since early 2010.

Despite the drastic upwards revision of the forecast for the 2009 budget deficit in October 2009, Greek borrowing rates initially rose rather slowly. By April 2010 it was apparent that the country was becoming unable to borrow from the markets; on 23 April 2010, the Greek government requested an initial loan of €45 billion from the EU and International Monetary Fund (IMF) to cover its financial needs for the remaining part of 2010. A few days later, Standard & Poor's slashed Greece's sovereign debt rating to BB+ or "junk" status amid fears of default, in which case investors were liable to lose 30–50% of their money. Stock markets worldwide and the euro currency declined in response to the downgrade.

On 1 May 2010, the Greek government announced a series of austerity measures (the third austerity package within months) to secure a three-year €110 billion loan (First Economic Adjustment Programme). This was met with great anger by some Greeks, leading to massive protests, riots, and social unrest throughout Greece. The Troika, a tripartite committee formed by the European Commission, the European Central Bank and the International Monetary Fund (EC, ECB and IMF), offered Greece a second bailout loan worth €130 billion in October 2011 (Second Economic Adjustment Programme), but with the activation being conditional on implementation of further austerity measures and a debt restructure agreement. Surprisingly, Greek prime minister George Papandreou first answered that call by announcing the 2011 Greek proposed economy referendum on the new bailout plan, but had to back down amidst strong pressure from EU partners, who threatened to withhold an overdue €6 billion loan payment that Greece needed by mid-December. On 10 November 2011, Papandreou resigned following an agreement with the New Democracy party and the Popular Orthodox Rally to appoint non-MP technocrat Lucas Papademos as new prime minister of an interim national union government, with responsibility for implementing the needed austerity measures to pave the way for the second bailout loan.

All the implemented austerity measures have helped Greece bring down its primary deficit—i.e., fiscal deficit before interest payments—from €24.7bn (10.6% of GDP) in 2009 to just €5.2bn (2.4% of GDP) in 2011, but as a side-effect they also contributed to a worsening of the Greek recession, which began in October 2008 and only became worse in 2010 and 2011. The Greek GDP had its worst decline in 2011 with −6.9%, a year where the seasonal adjusted industrial output ended 28.4% lower than in 2005, and with 111,000 Greek companies going bankrupt (27% higher than in 2010). As a result, Greeks have lost about 40% of their purchasing power since the start of the crisis, they spend 40% less on goods and services, and the seasonal adjusted unemployment rate grew from 7.5% in September 2008 to a record high of 27.9% in June 2013, while the youth unemployment rate rose from 22.0% to as high as 62%. Youth unemployment ratio hit 16.1 per cent in 2012.

Overall the share of the population living at "risk of poverty or social exclusion" did not increase notably during the first two years of the crisis. The figure was measured to 27.6% in 2009 and 27.7% in 2010 (only being slightly worse than the EU27-average at 23.4%), but for 2011 the figure was now estimated to have risen sharply above 33%. In February 2012, an IMF official negotiating Greek austerity measures admitted that excessive spending cuts were harming Greece. The IMF predicted the Greek economy to contract by 5.5% by 2014. Harsh austerity measures led to an actual contraction after six years of recession of 17%.

Some economic experts argue that the best option for Greece, and the rest of the EU, would be to engineer an "orderly default", allowing Athens to withdraw simultaneously from the eurozone and reintroduce its national currency the drachma at a debased rate. If Greece were to leave the euro, the economic and political consequences would be devastating. According to Japanese financial company Nomura an exit would lead to a 60% devaluation of the new drachma. Analysts at French bank BNP Paribas added that the fallout from a Greek exit would wipe 20% off Greece's GDP, increase Greece's debt-to-GDP ratio to over 200%, and send inflation soaring to 40–50%. Also UBS warned of hyperinflation, a bank run and even "military coups and possible civil war that could afflict a departing country". Eurozone National Central Banks (NCBs) may lose up to €100bn in debt claims against the Greek national bank through the ECB's TARGET2 system. The Deutsche Bundesbank alone may have to write off €27bn.

To prevent this from happening, the Troika (EC, IMF and ECB) eventually agreed in February 2012 to provide a second bailout package worth €130 billion, conditional on the implementation of another harsh austerity package that would reduce Greek expenditure by €3.3bn in 2012 and another €10bn in 2013 and 2014.

Then, in March 2012, the Greek government did finally default on parts of its debt - as there was a new law passed by the government so that private holders of Greek government bonds (banks, insurers and investment funds) would "voluntarily" accept a bond swap with a 53.5% nominal write-off, partly in short-term EFSF notes, partly in new Greek bonds with lower interest rates and the maturity prolonged to 11–30 years (independently of the previous maturity). This counted as a "credit event" and holders of credit default swaps were paid accordingly. It was the world's biggest debt restructuring deal ever done, affecting some €206 billion of Greek government bonds. The debt write-off had a size of €107 billion, and caused the Greek debt level to temporarily fall from roughly €350bn to €240bn in March 2012 (it would subsequently rise again, due to the resulting bank recapitalization needs), with improved predictions about the debt burden. In December 2012, the Greek government bought back €21 billion ($27 billion) of their bonds for 33 cents on the euro.

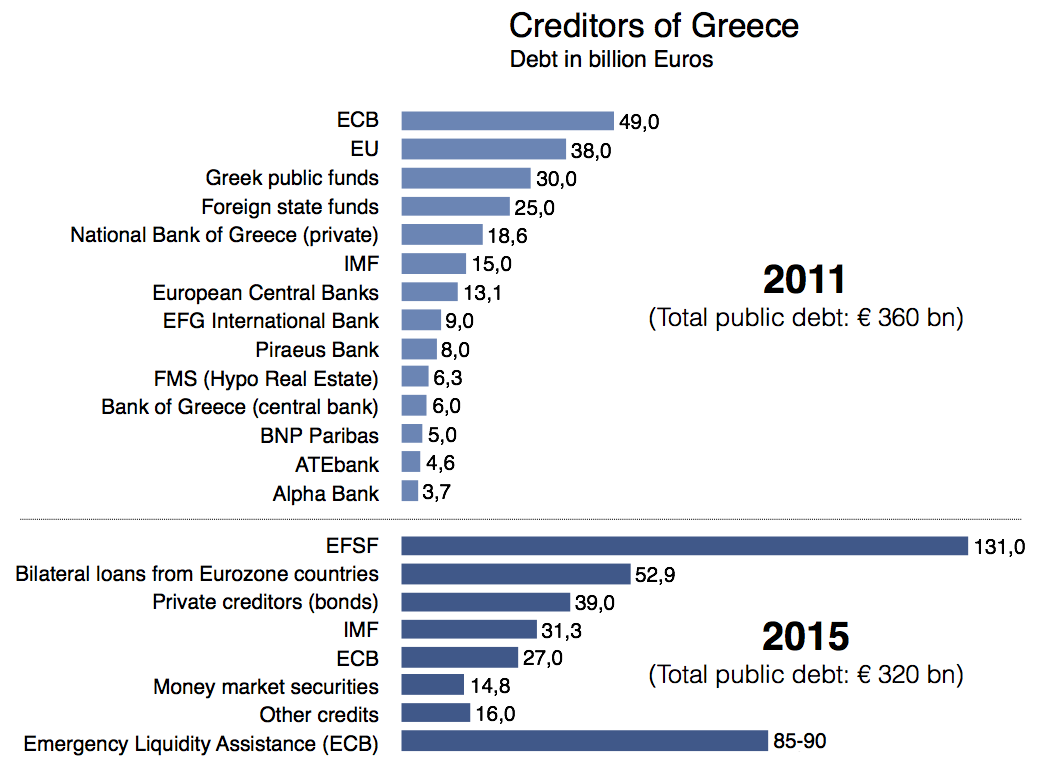
Creditors of Greece 2011 and 2015

Critics such as the director of LSE's Hellenic Observatory argue that the billions of taxpayer euros are not saving Greece but financial institutions. Of all €252bn in bailouts between 2010 and 2015, just 10% has found its way into financing continued public deficit spending on the Greek government accounts. Much of the rest went straight into refinancing the old stock of Greek government debt (originating mainly from the high general government deficits being run in previous years), which was mainly held by private banks and hedge funds by the end of 2009. According to LSE, "more than 80% of the rescue package" is going to refinance the expensive old maturing Greek government debt towards private creditors (mainly private banks outside Greece), replacing it with new debt to public creditors on more favourable terms, that is to say paying out their private creditors with new debt issued by its new group of public creditors known as the Troika.

The shift in liabilities from European banks to European taxpayers has been staggering. One study found that the public debt of Greece to foreign governments, including debt to the EU/IMF loan facility and debt through the Eurosystem, increased from €47.8bn to €180.5bn (+132,7bn) between January 2010 and September 2011, while the combined exposure of foreign banks to (public and private) Greek entities was reduced from well over €200bn in 2009 to around €80bn (−€120bn) by mid-February 2012. As of 2015, 78% of Greek debt is owed to public sector institutions, primarily the EU. According to a study by the European School of Management and Technology only €9.7bn or less than 5% of the first two bailout programs went to the Greek fiscal budget, while most of the money went to French and German banks (In June 2010, France's and Germany's foreign claims vis-a-vis Greece were $57bn and $31bn respectively. German banks owned $60bn of Greek, Portuguese, Irish and Spanish government debt and $151bn of banks' debt of these countries).

According to a leaked document, dated May 2010, the IMF was fully aware of the fact that the Greek bailout program was aimed at rescuing the private European banks – mainly from France and Germany. A number of IMF Executive Board members from India, Brazil, Argentina, Russia, and Switzerland criticized this in an internal memorandum, pointing out that Greek debt would be unsustainable. However their French, German and Dutch colleagues refused to reduce the Greek debt or to make (their) private banks pay.

In mid May 2012, the crisis and impossibility to form a new government after elections and the possible victory by the anti-austerity axis led to new speculations Greece would have to leave the eurozone shortly. This phenomenon became known as "Grexit" and started to govern international market behaviour. The centre-right's narrow victory in the 17 June election gave hope that Greece would honour its obligations and stay in the eurozone.

Due to a delayed reform schedule and a worsened economic recession, the new government immediately asked the Troika to be granted an extended deadline from 2015 to 2017 before being required to restore the budget into a self-financed situation; which in effect was equal to a request of a third bailout package for 2015–16 worth €32.6bn of extra loans. On 11 November 2012, facing a default by the end of November, the Greek parliament passed a new austerity package worth €18.8bn, including a "labour market reform" and "mid term fiscal plan 2013–16". In return, the Eurogroup agreed on the following day to lower interest rates and prolong debt maturities and to provide Greece with additional funds of around €10bn for a debt-buy-back programme. The latter allowed Greece to retire about half of the €62 billion in debt that Athens owes private creditors, thereby shaving roughly €20 billion off that debt. This should bring Greece's debt-to-GDP ratio down to 124% by 2020 and well below 110% two years later. Without agreement the debt-to-GDP ratio would have risen to 188% in 2013.

The Financial Times special report on the future of the European Union argues that the liberalisation of labour markets has allowed Greece to narrow the cost-competitiveness gap with other southern eurozone countries by approximately 50% over the past two years. This has been achieved primary through wage reductions, though businesses have reacted positively. The opening of product and service markets is proving tough because interest groups are slowing reforms. The biggest challenge for Greece is to overhaul the tax administration with a significant part of annually assessed taxes not paid. Poul Thomsen, the IMF official who heads the bailout mission in Greece, stated that "in structural terms, Greece is more than halfway there".

In June 2013, Equity index provider MSCI reclassified Greece as an emerging market, citing failure to qualify on several criteria for market accessibility.

Both of the latest bailout programme audit reports, released independently by the European Commission and IMF in June 2014, revealed that even after transfer of the scheduled bailout funds and full implementation of the agreed adjustment package in 2012, there was a new forecast financing gap of: €5.6bn in 2014, €12.3bn in 2015, and €0bn in 2016. The new forecast financing gaps will need either to be covered by the government's additional lending from private capital markets, or to be countered by additional fiscal improvements through expenditure reductions, revenue hikes or increased amount of privatizations. Due to an improved outlook for the Greek economy, with return of a government structural surplus in 2012, return of real GDP growth in 2014, and a decline of the unemployment rate in 2015, it was possible for the Greek government to return to the bond market during the course of 2014, for the purpose of fully funding its new extra financing gaps with additional private capital. A total of €6.1bn was received from the sale of three-year and five-year bonds in 2014, and the Greek government now plans to cover its forecast financing gap for 2015 with additional sales of seven-year and ten-year bonds in 2015.

The latest recalculation of the seasonally adjusted quarterly GDP figures for the Greek economy revealed that it had been hit by three distinct recessions in the turmoil of the 2008 financial crisis:

- Q3-2007 until Q4-2007 (duration = 2 quarters)
- Q2-2008 until Q1-2009 (duration = 4 quarters, referred to as being part of the Great Recession)
- Q3-2009 until Q4-2013 (duration = 18 quarters, referred to as being part of the eurozone crisis)

Greece experienced positive economic growth in each of the three first quarters of 2014. The return of economic growth, along with the now existing underlying structural budget surplus of the general government, build the basis for the debt-to-GDP ratio to start a significant decline in the coming years ahead, which will help ensure that Greece will be labelled "debt sustainable" and fully regain complete access to private lending markets in 2015. (Note: According to ECB's definition, a sovereign state will have managed to regain complete access to private lending markets, when it succeeds in issuing new government bonds with a ten-year maturity.) While the Greek government-debt crisis hereby is forecast officially to end in 2015, many of its negative repercussions (e.g. a high unemployment rate) are forecast still to be felt during many of the subsequent years.

During the second half of 2014, the Greek government again negotiated with the Troika. The negotiations were this time about how to comply with the programme requirements, to ensure activation of the payment of its last scheduled eurozone bailout tranche in December 2014, and about a potential update of its remaining bailout programme for 2015–16. When calculating the impact of the 2015 fiscal budget presented by the Greek government, there was a disagreement, with the calculations of the Greek government showing it fully complied with the goals of its agreed "Midterm fiscal plan 2013–16", while the Troika calculations were less optimistic and returned a not covered financing gap at €2.5bn (being required to be covered by additional austerity measures). As the Greek government insisted their calculations were more accurate than those presented by the Troika, they submitted an unchanged fiscal budget bill on 21 November, to be voted for by the parliament on 7 December. The Eurogroup was scheduled to meet and discuss the updated review of the Greek bailout programme on 8 December (to be published on the same day), and the potential adjustments to the remaining programme for 2015–16. There were rumours in the press that the Greek government has proposed immediately to end the previously agreed and continuing IMF bailout programme for 2015–16, replacing it with the transfer of €11bn unused bank recapitalization funds currently held as reserve by the Hellenic Financial Stability Fund (HFSF), along with establishment of a new precautionary Enhanced Conditions Credit Line (ECCL) issued by the European Stability Mechanism. The ECCL instrument is often used as a follow-up precautionary measure, when a state has exited its sovereign bailout programme, with transfers only taking place if adverse financial/economic circumstances materialize, but with the positive effect that it help calm down financial markets as the presence of this extra backup guarantee mechanism makes the environment safer for investors.

The positive economic outlook for Greece—based on the return of seasonally adjusted real GDP growth across the first three quarters of 2014—was replaced by a new fourth recession starting in Q4-2014. This new fourth recession was widely assessed as being direct related to the premature snap parliamentary election called by the Greek parliament in December 2014 and the following formation of a Syriza-led government refusing to accept respecting the terms of its current bailout agreement. The rising political uncertainty of what would follow caused the Troika to suspend all scheduled remaining aid to Greece under its second programme, until such time as the Greek government either accepted the previously negotiated conditional payment terms or alternatively could reach a mutually accepted agreement of some new updated terms with its public creditors. This rift caused a renewed increasingly growing liquidity crisis (both for the Greek government and Greek financial system), resulting in plummeting stock prices at the Athens Stock Exchange while interest rates for the Greek government at the private lending market spiked to levels once again making it inaccessible as an alternative funding source.

Faced by the threat of a sovereign default and potential resulting exit of the eurozone, some final attempts were made by the Greek government in May 2015 to settle an agreement with the Troika about some adjusted terms for Greece to comply with in order to activate the transfer of the frozen bailout funds in its second programme. In the process, the Eurogroup granted a six-month technical extension of its second bailout programme to Greece.

On 5 July 2015, the citizens of Greece voted decisively (a 61% to 39% decision with 62.5% voter turnout) to reject a referendum that would have given Greece more bailout help from other EU members in return for increased austerity measures. As a result of this vote, Greece's finance minister Yanis Varoufakis stepped down on 6 July. Greece was the first developed country not to make a payment to the IMF on time, in 2015 (payment was made with a 20-day delay). Eventually, Greece agreed on a third bailout package in August 2015.

Between 2009 and 2017 the Greek government debt rose from €300 bn to €318 bn, i.e. by only about 6% (thanks, in part, to the 2012 debt restructuring); however, during the same period, the critical debt-to-GDP ratio shot up from 127% to 179% basically due to the severe GDP drop during the handling of the crisis.

Greece's bailouts successfully ended (as declared) on 20 August 2018.The country has exhibited a remarkable recovery thereafter, evidenced by early debt repayments, falling borrowing costs and strong growth rates.

=== Ireland ===
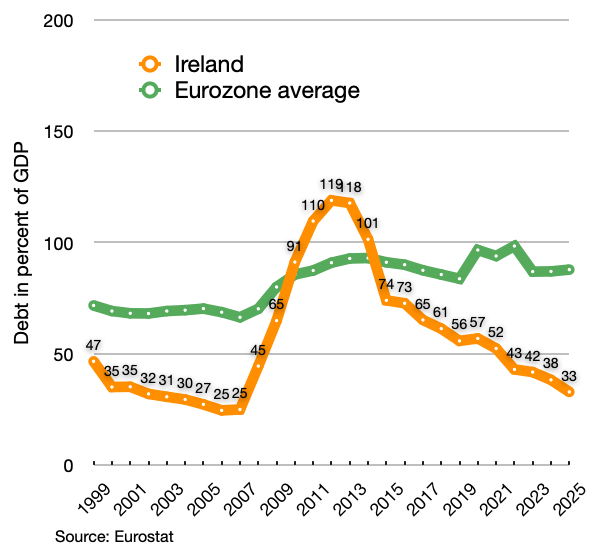
Debt of Ireland compared to eurozone average since 1999

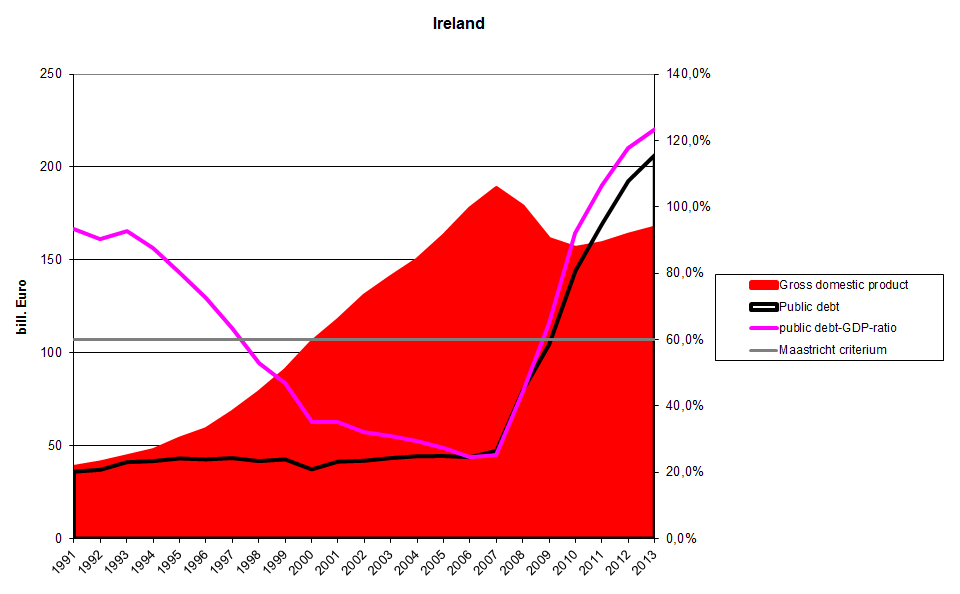
Public debt, gross domestic product (GDP), and public debt-to-GDP ratio. Graph based on "ameco" data from the European Commission.

The Irish sovereign debt crisis arose not from government over-spending, but from the state guaranteeing the six main Irish-based banks who had financed a property bubble. On 29 September 2008, Finance Minister Brian Lenihan Jnr issued a two-year guarantee to the banks' depositors and bondholders. The guarantees were subsequently renewed for new deposits and bonds in a slightly different manner. In 2009, a National Asset Management Agency (NAMA) was created to acquire large property-related loans from the six banks at a market-related "long-term economic value".

Irish banks had lost an estimated 100 billion euros, much of it related to defaulted loans to property developers and homeowners made in the midst of the property bubble, which burst around 2007. The economy collapsed during 2008. Unemployment rose from 4% in 2006 to 14% by 2010, while the national budget went from a surplus in 2007 to a deficit of 32% GDP in 2010, the highest in the history of the eurozone, despite austerity measures.

With Ireland's credit rating falling rapidly in the face of mounting estimates of the banking losses, guaranteed depositors and bondholders cashed in during 2009–10, and especially after August 2010. (The necessary funds were borrowed from the central bank.) With yields on Irish Government debt rising rapidly, it was clear that the Government would have to seek assistance from the EU and IMF, resulting in a €67.5 billion "bailout" agreement of 29 November 2010. Together with additional €17.5 billion coming from Ireland's own reserves and pensions, the government received €85 billion, of which up to €34 billion was to be used to support the country's failing financial sector (only about half of this was used in that way following stress tests conducted in 2011). In return the government agreed to reduce its budget deficit to below three per cent by 2015. In April 2011, despite all the measures taken, Moody's downgraded the banks' debt to junk status.

In July 2011, European leaders agreed to cut the interest rate that Ireland was paying on its EU/IMF bailout loan from around 6% to between 3.5% and 4% and to double the loan time to 15 years. The move was expected to save the country between 600 and 700 million euros per year. On 14 September 2011, in a move to further ease Ireland's difficult financial situation, the European Commission announced it would cut the interest rate on its €22.5 billion loan coming from the European Financial Stability Mechanism, down to 2.59 per cent—which is the interest rate the EU itself pays to borrow from financial markets.

The Euro Plus Monitor report from November 2011 attests to Ireland's vast progress in dealing with its financial crisis, expecting the country to stand on its own feet again and finance itself without any external support from the second half of 2012 onwards. According to the Centre for Economics and Business Research, Ireland's export-led recovery "will gradually pull its economy out of its trough". As a result of the improved economic outlook, the cost of 10-year government bonds has fallen from its record high at 12% in mid July 2011 to below 4% in 2013 (see the graph "Long-term Interest Rates").

On 26 July 2012, for the first time since September 2010, Ireland was able to return to the financial markets, selling over €5 billion in long-term government debt, with an interest rate of 5.9% for the 5-year bonds and 6.1% for the 8-year bonds at sale. In December 2013, after three years on financial life support, Ireland finally left the EU/IMF bailout programme, although it retained a debt of €22.5 billion to the IMF; in August 2014, early repayment of €15 billion was being considered, which would save the country €375 million in surcharges. Despite the end of the bailout the country's unemployment rate remains high and public sector wages are still around 20% lower than at the beginning of the crisis. Government debt reached 123.7% of GDP in 2013.

On 13 March 2013, Ireland managed to regain complete lending access on financial markets, when it successfully issued €5bn of 10-year maturity bonds at a yield of 4.3%. Ireland ended its bailout programme as scheduled in December 2013, without any need for additional financial support.

=== Portugal ===
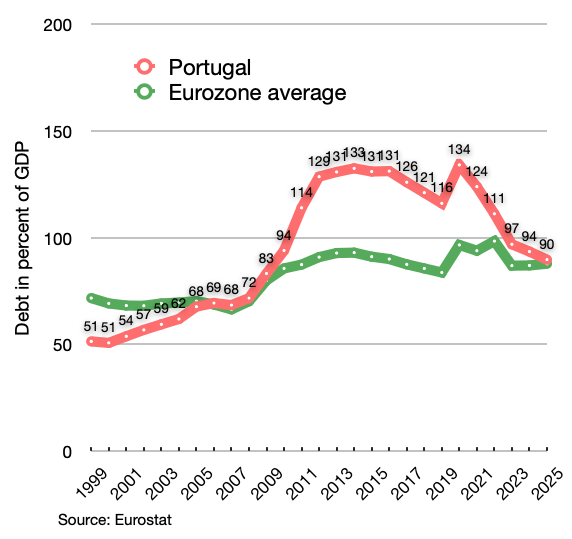
Debt of Portugal compared to eurozone average since 1999

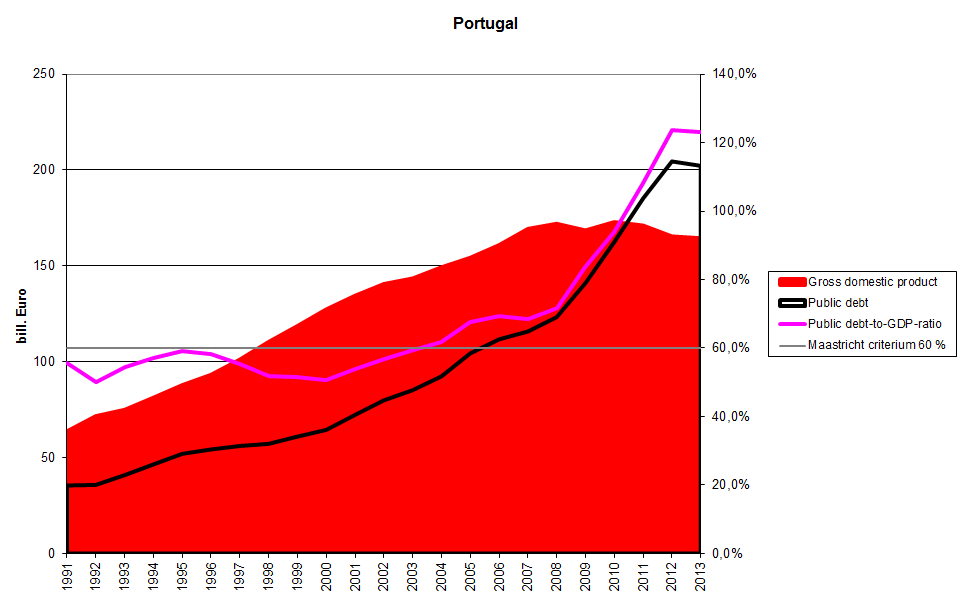
Portugal's public debt, gross domestic product (GDP), and public debt-to-GDP ratio. Graph based on "ameco" data from the European Commission.

Unlike other European countries that were also severely hit by the Great Recession in the late 2000s and eventually received bailouts in the early 2010s (such as Greece and Ireland), Portugal had the characteristic that the 2000s were not marked by economic growth, but were already a period of economic crisis, marked by stagnation, two recessions (in 2002–03 and 2008–09) and government-sponsored fiscal austerity in order to reduce the budget deficit to the limits allowed by the European Union's Stability and Growth Pact.

According to a report by the Diário de Notícias, When the global crisis disrupted the markets and the world economy, together with the US subprime mortgage crisis and the eurozone crisis, Portugal was one of the first economies to succumb, and was affected very deeply.

In the summer of 2010, Moody's Investors Service cut Portugal's sovereign bond rating, which led to an increased pressure on Portuguese government bonds. In the first half of 2011, Portugal requested a €78 billion IMF-EU bailout package in a bid to stabilise its public finances.

Portugal's debt was in September 2012 forecast by the Troika to peak at around 124% of GDP in 2014, followed by a firm downward trajectory after 2014. Previously the Troika had predicted it would peak at 118.5% of GDP in 2013, so the developments proved to be a bit worse than first anticipated, but the situation was described as fully sustainable and progressing well. As a result, from the slightly worse economic circumstances, the country has been given one more year to reduce the budget deficit to a level below 3% of GDP, moving the target year from 2013 to 2014. The budget deficit for 2012 has been forecast to end at 5%. The recession in the economy is now also projected to last until 2013, with GDP declining 3% in 2012 and 1% in 2013; followed by a return to positive real growth in 2014. Unemployment rate increased to over 17% by end of 2012 but it has since decreased gradually to 10,5% as of November 2016.

As part of the bailout programme, Portugal was required to regain complete access to financial markets by September 2013. The first step towards this target was successfully taken on 3 October 2012, when the country managed to regain partial market access by selling a bond series with 3-year maturity. Once Portugal regains complete market access, measured as the moment it successfully manages to sell a bond series with a full 10-year maturity, it is expected to benefit from interventions by the ECB, which announced readiness to implement extended support in the form of some yield-lowering bond purchases (OMTs), aiming to bring governmental interest rates down to sustainable levels. A peak for the Portuguese 10-year governmental interest rates happened on 30 January 2012, where it reached 17.3% after the rating agencies had cut the governments credit rating to "non-investment grade" (also referred to as "junk"). As of December 2012, it has been more than halved to only 7%. A successful return to the long-term lending market was made by the issuing of a 5-year maturity bond series in January 2013, and the state regained complete lending access when it successfully issued a 10-year maturity bond series on 7 May 2013.

According to the Financial Times special report on the future of the European Union, the Portuguese government has "made progress in reforming labour legislation, cutting previously generous redundancy payments by more than half and freeing smaller employers from collective bargaining obligations, all components of Portugal's €78 billion bailout program". Additionally, unit labour costs have fallen since 2009, working practices are liberalizing, and industrial licensing is being streamlined.

On 18 May 2014, Portugal left the EU bailout mechanism without additional need for support, as it had already regained a complete access to lending markets back in May 2013, and with its latest issuing of a 10-year government bond being successfully completed with a rate as low as 3.59%. Portugal still has many tough years ahead. During the crisis, Portugal's government debt increased from 93 to 139 percent of GDP. On 3 August 2014, Banco de Portugal announced the country's second biggest bank Banco Espírito Santo would be split in two after losing the equivalent of $4.8 billion in the first 6 months of 2014, sending its shares down by 89 percent.

=== Spain ===
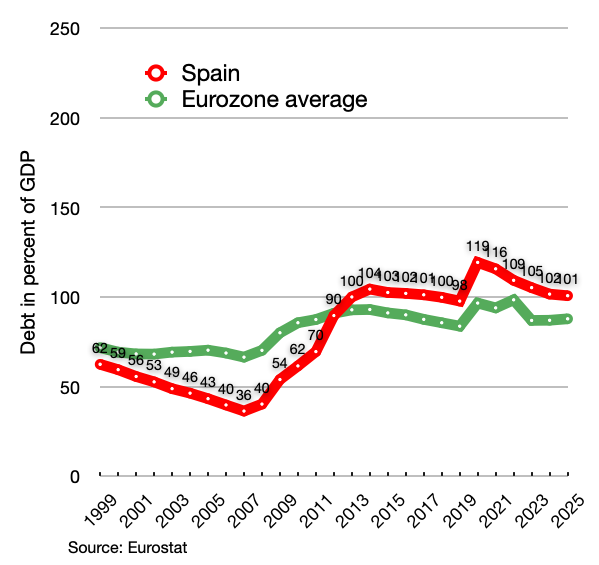
Debt of Spain compared to eurozone average since 1999

Spain had a comparatively low debt level among advanced economies prior to the crisis. Its public debt relative to GDP in 2010 was only 60%, more than 20 points less than Germany, France or the US, and more than 60 points less than Italy or Greece. Debt was largely avoided by the ballooning tax revenue from the housing bubble, which helped accommodate a decade of increased government spending without debt accumulation. When the bubble burst, Spain spent large amounts of money on bank bailouts. In May 2012, Bankia received a 19 billion euro bailout, on top of the previous 4.5 billion euros to prop up Bankia. Questionable accounting methods disguised bank losses. During September 2012, regulators indicated that Spanish banks required €59 billion (US$77 billion) in additional capital to offset losses from real estate investments.

The bank bailouts and the economic downturn increased the country's deficit and debt levels and led to a substantial downgrading of its credit rating. To build up trust in the financial markets, the government began to introduce austerity measures and in 2011 it passed a law in congress to approve an amendment to the Spanish Constitution to require a balanced budget at both the national and regional level by 2020. The amendment states that public debt can not exceed 60% of GDP, though exceptions would be made in case of a natural catastrophe, economic recession or other emergencies. As one of the largest eurozone economies (larger than Greece, Portugal and Ireland combined) the condition of Spain's economy is of particular concern to international observers. Under pressure from the United States, the IMF, other European countries and the European Commission the Spanish governments eventually succeeded in trimming the deficit from 11.2% of GDP in 2009 to 7.1% in 2013.

Nevertheless, in June 2012, Spain became a prime concern for the Euro-zone when interest on Spain's 10-year bonds reached the 7% level and it faced difficulty in accessing bond markets. This led the Eurogroup on 9 June 2012 to grant Spain a financial support package of up to €100 billion. The funds will not go directly to Spanish banks, but be transferred to a government-owned Spanish fund responsible to conduct the needed bank recapitalisations (FROB), and thus it will be counted for as additional sovereign debt in Spain's national account. An economic forecast in June 2012 highlighted the need for the arranged bank recapitalisation support package, as the outlook promised a negative growth rate of 1.7%, unemployment rising to 25%, and a continued declining trend for housing prices. In September 2012 the ECB removed some of the pressure from Spain on financial markets, when it announced its "unlimited bond-buying plan", to be initiated if Spain would sign a new sovereign bailout package with EFSF/ESM. Strictly speaking, Spain was not hit by a sovereign debt-crisis in 2012, as the financial support package that they received from the ESM was earmarked for a bank recapitalization fund and did not include financial support for the government itself.

According to the latest debt sustainability analysis published by the European Commission in October 2012, the fiscal outlook for Spain, if assuming the country will stick to the fiscal consolidation path and targets outlined by the country's current EDP programme, will result in a debt-to-GDP ratio reaching its maximum at 110% in 2018—followed by a declining trend in subsequent years. In regards of the structural deficit the same outlook has promised, that it will gradually decline to comply with the maximum 0.5% level required by the Fiscal Compact in 2022/2027.

Though Spain was suffering with 27% unemployment and the economy was shrinking 1.4% in 2013, Mariano Rajoy's conservative government has pledged to speed up reforms, according to the Financial Times special report on the future of the European Union. "Madrid is reviewing its labour market and pension reforms and has promised by the end of this year to liberalize its heavily regulated professions". But Spain is benefiting from improved labour cost competitiveness. "They have not lost export market share," says Eric Chaney, chief economist at Axa. "If credit starts flowing again, Spain could surprise us".

On 23 January 2014, as foreign investor confidence in the country has been restored, Spain formally exited the EU/IMF bailout mechanism. By the end of March 2018, unemployment rate of Spain has fallen to 16.1% and the debt is 98,30% of the GDP.

=== Cyprus ===
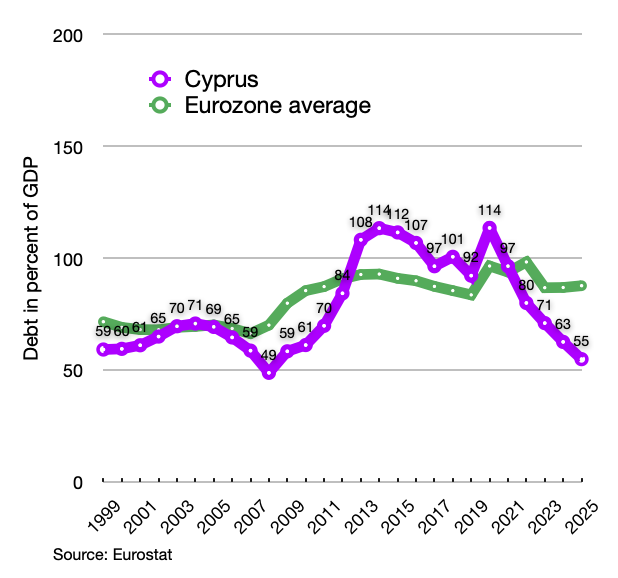
Debt of Cyprus compared to eurozone average since 1999

The economy of the small island of Cyprus with 840,000 people was hit by several huge blows in and around 2012 including, amongst other things, the €22 billion exposure of Cypriot banks to the Greek debt haircut, the downgrading of the Cypriot economy into junk status by international rating agencies and the inability of the government to refund its state expenses.

On 25 June 2012, the Cypriot Government requested a bailout from the European Financial Stability Facility or the European Stability Mechanism, citing difficulties in supporting its banking sector from the exposure to the Greek debt haircut.

On 30 November the Troika (the European Commission, the International Monetary Fund, and the European Central Bank) and the Cypriot Government had agreed on the bailout terms with only the amount of money required for the bailout remaining to be agreed upon. Bailout terms include strong austerity measures, including cuts in civil service salaries, social benefits, allowances and pensions and increases in VAT, tobacco, alcohol and fuel taxes, taxes on lottery winnings, property, and higher public health care charges. At the insistence of the Commission negotiators, at first the proposal also included an unprecedented one-off levy of 6.7% for deposits up to €100,000 and 9.9% for higher deposits on all domestic bank accounts. Following public outcry, the eurozone finance ministers were forced to change the levy, excluding deposits of less than €100,000, and introducing a higher 15.6% levy on deposits of above €100,000 ($129,600)—in line with the EU minimum deposit guarantee. This revised deal was also rejected by the Cypriot parliament on 19 March 2013 with 36 votes against, 19 abstentions and one not present for the vote.

The final agreement was settled on 25 March 2013, with the proposal to close the most troubled Laiki Bank, which helped significantly to reduce the needed loan amount for the overall bailout package, so that €10bn was sufficient without need for imposing a general levy on bank deposits. The final conditions for activation of the bailout package was outlined by the Troika's MoU agreement, which was endorsed in full by the Cypriot House of Representatives on 30 April 2013. It includes:

1. Recapitalisation of the entire financial sector while accepting a closure of the Laiki bank,
2. Implementation of the anti–money laundering framework in Cypriot financial institutions,
3. Fiscal consolidation to help bring down the Cypriot governmental budget deficit,
4. Structural reforms to restore competitiveness and macroeconomic imbalances,
5. Privatization programme.

The Cypriot debt-to-GDP ratio is on this background now forecasted only to peak at 126% in 2015 and subsequently decline to 105% in 2020, and thus considered to remain within sustainable territory.

Although the bailout support programme feature sufficient financial transfers until March 2016, Cyprus began slowly to regain its access to the private lending markets already in June 2014. At this point of time, the government sold €0.75bn of bonds with a five-year maturity, to the tune of a 4.85% yield. A continued selling of bonds with a ten-year maturity, which would equal a regain of complete access to the private lending market (and mark the end of the era with need for bailout support), is expected to happen sometime in 2015. The Cypriot minister of finance recently confirmed, that the government plan to issue two new European Medium Term Note (EMTN) bonds in 2015, likely shortly ahead of the expiry of another €1.1bn bond on 1 July and a second expiry of a €0.9bn bond on 1 November. As announced in advance, the Cypriot government issued €1bn of seven-year bonds with a 4.0% yield by the end of April 2015.

Public debt in 2017 (source: factsmaps, The World Factbook, Central Intelligence Agency) Legend: < 30%, < 60% to Maastricht criteria; > 90%, > 60% to Maastricht criteria

== Policy reactions ==
=== EU emergency measures ===
The table below provides an overview of the financial composition of all bailout programs being initiated for EU member states, since the 2008 financial crisis. EU member states outside the eurozone (marked with yellow in the table) have no access to the funds provided by EFSF/ESM, but can be covered with rescue loans from EU's Balance of Payments programme (BoP), IMF and bilateral loans (with an extra possible assistance from the Worldbank/EIB/EBRD if classified as a development country). Since October 2012, the ESM as a permanent new financial stability fund to cover any future potential bailout packages within the eurozone, has effectively replaced the now defunct GLF + EFSM + EFSF funds. Whenever pledged funds in a scheduled bailout program were not transferred in full, the table has noted this by writing "Y out of X".

EU member	Time span	IMF (billion €)	World Bank (billion €)	EIB / EBRD (billion €)	Bilateral (billion €)	BoP (billion €)	GLF (billion €)	EFSM (billion €)	EFSF (billion €)	ESM (billion €)	Bailout in total (billion €)
Cyprus I^{1}	Dec.2011-Dec.2012	–	–	–	2.5	–	–	–	–	–	2.5^{1}
Cyprus II^{2}	May 2013-Mar.2016	1.0	–	–	–	–	–	–	–	6.3 out of 9.0	7.3 out of 10.0^{2}
Greece I+II^{3}	May 2010-Jun.2015	32.1 out of 48.1	–	–	–	–	52.9	–	130.9 out of 144.6	–	215.9 out of 245.6^{3}
Greece III^{4}	Aug.2015-Aug.2018	(proportion of 86, to be decided Oct.2015)	–	–	–	–	–	–	–	(up till 86)	86^{4}
Hungary^{5}	Nov.2008-Oct.2010	9.1 out of 12.5	1.0	–	–	5.5 out of 6.5	–	–	–	–	15.6 out of 20.0^{5}
Ireland^{6}	Nov.2010-Dec.2013	22.5	–	–	4.8	–	–	22.5	18.4	–	68.2^{6}
Latvia^{7}	Dec.2008-Dec.2011	1.1 out of 1.7	0.4	0.1	0.0 out of 2.2	2.9 out of 3.1	–	–	–	–	4.5 out of 7.5^{7}
Portugal^{8}	May 2011-Jun 2014	26.5 out of 27.4	–	–	–	–	–	24.3 out of 25.6	26.0	–	76.8 out of 79.0^{8}
Romania I^{9}	May 2009-Jun 2011	12.6 out of 13.6	1.0	1.0	–	5.0	–	–	–	–	19.6 out of 20.6^{9}
Romania II^{10}	Mar 2011-Jun 2013	0.0 out of 3.6	1.15	–	–	0.0 out of 1.4	–	–	–	–	1.15 out of 6.15^{10}
Romania III^{11}	Oct 2013-Sep 2015	0.0 out of 2.0	2.5	–	–	0.0 out of 2.0	–	–	–	–	2.5 out of 6.5^{11}
Spain^{12}	July 2012-Dec.2013	–	–	–	–	–	–	–	–	41.3 out of 100	41.3 out of 100^{12}
Total payment	Nov.2008-Aug.2018	104.9	6.05	1.1	7.3	13.4	52.9	46.8	175.3	136.3	544.05

1 Cyprus received in late December 2011 a €2.5bn bilateral emergency bailout loan from Russia, to cover its governmental budget deficits and a refinancing of maturing governmental debts until 31 December 2012. Initially the bailout loan was supposed to be fully repaid in 2016, but as part of establishment of the later following second Cypriot bailout programme, Russia accepted a delayed repayment in eight biannual tranches throughout 2018–2021 - while also lowering its requested interest rate from 4.5% to 2.5%.
2 When it became evident Cyprus needed an additional bailout loan to cover the government's fiscal operations throughout 2013–2015, on top of additional funding needs for recapitalization of the Cypriot financial sector, negotiations for such an extra bailout package started with the Troika in June 2012. In December 2012 a preliminary estimate indicated, that the needed overall bailout package should have a size of €17.5bn, comprising €10bn for bank recapitalisation and €6.0bn for refinancing maturing debt plus €1.5bn to cover budget deficits in 2013+2014+2015, which in total would have increased the Cypriot debt-to-GDP ratio to around 140%. The final agreed package however only entailed a €10bn support package, financed partly by IMF (€1bn) and ESM (€9bn), because it was possible to reach a fund saving agreement with the Cypriot authorities, featuring a direct closure of the most troubled Laiki Bank and a forced bail-in recapitalisation plan for Bank of Cyprus.
The final conditions for activation of the bailout package was outlined by the Troika's MoU agreement in April 2013, and include: (1) Recapitalisation of the entire financial sector while accepting a closure of the Laiki bank, (2) Implementation of the anti–money laundering framework in Cypriot financial institutions, (3) Fiscal consolidation to help bring down the Cypriot governmental budget deficit, (4) Structural reforms to restore competitiveness and macroeconomic imbalances, (5) Privatization programme. The Cypriot debt-to-GDP ratio is on this background now forecasted only to peak at 126% in 2015 and subsequently decline to 105% in 2020, and thus considered to remain within sustainable territory. The €10bn bailout comprise €4.1bn spend on debt liabilities (refinancing and amortization), 3.4bn to cover fiscal deficits, and €2.5bn for the bank recapitalization. These amounts will be paid to Cyprus through regular tranches from 13 May 2013 until 31 March 2016. According to the programme this will be sufficient, as Cyprus during the programme period in addition will: Receive €1.0bn extraordinary revenue from privatization of government assets, ensure an automatic roll-over of €1.0bn maturing Treasury Bills and €1.0bn of maturing bonds held by domestic creditors, bring down the funding need for bank recapitalization with €8.7bn — of which 0.4bn is reinjection of future profit earned by the Cyprus Central Bank (injected in advance at the short term by selling its gold reserve) and €8.3bn origin from the bail-in of creditors in Laiki bank and Bank of Cyprus. The forced automatic rollover of maturing bonds held by domestic creditors were conducted in 2013, and equaled according to some credit rating agencies a "selective default" or "restrictive default", mainly because the fixed yields of the new bonds did not reflect the market rates — while maturities at the same time automatically were extended. Cyprus successfully concluded its three-year financial assistance programme at the end of March 2016, having borrowed a total of €6.3 billion from the European Stability Mechanism and €1 billion from the International Monetary Fund. The remaining €2.7 billion of the ESM bailout was never dispensed, due to the Cypriot government's better than expected finances over the course of the programme.
3 Many sources list the first bailout was €110bn followed by the second on €130bn. When you deduct €2.7bn due to Ireland+Portugal+Slovakia opting out as creditors for the first bailout, and add the extra €8.2bn IMF has promised to pay Greece for the years in 2015-16 (through a programme extension implemented in December 2012), the total amount of bailout funds sums up to €245.6bn. The first bailout resulted in a payout of €20.1bn from IMF and €52.9bn from GLF, during the course of May 2010 until December 2011, and then it was technically replaced by a second bailout package for 2012-2016, which had a size of €172.6bn (€28bn from IMF and €144.6bn from EFSF), as it included the remaining committed amounts from the first bailout package. All committed IMF amounts were made available to the Greek government for financing its continued operation of public budget deficits and to refinance maturing public debt held by private creditors and IMF. The payments from EFSF were earmarked to finance €35.6bn of PSI restructured government debt (as part of a deal where private investors in return accepted a nominal haircut, lower interest rates and longer maturities for their remaining principal), €48.2bn for bank recapitalization, €11.3bn for a second PSI debt buy-back, while the remaining €49.5bn were made available to cover continued operation of public budget deficits. The combined programme was scheduled to expire in March 2016, after IMF had extended their programme period with extra loan tranches from January 2015 to March 2016 (as a mean to help Greece service the total sum of interests accruing during the lifespan of already issued IMF loans), while the Eurogroup at the same time opted to conduct their reimbursement and deferral of interests outside their bailout programme framework — with the EFSF programme still being planned to end in December 2014.
Due to the refusal by the Greek government to comply with the agreed conditional terms for receiving a continued flow of bailout transfers, both IMF and the Eurogroup opted to freeze their programmes since August 2014. To avoid a technical expiry, the Eurogroup postponed the expiry date for its frozen programme to 30 June 2015, paving the way within this new deadline for the possibility of transfer terms first to be renegotiated and then finally complied with to ensure completion of the programme. As Greece withdrew unilaterally from the process of settling renegotiated terms and time extension for the completion of the programme, it expired uncompleted on 30 June 2015. Hereby, Greece lost the possibility to extract €13.7bn of remaining funds from the EFSF (€1.0bn unused PSI and Bond Interest facilities, €10.9bn unused bank recapitalization funds and a €1.8bn frozen tranche of macroeconomic support), and also lost the remaining SDR 13.561bn of IMF funds (being equal to €16.0bn as per the SDR exchange rate on 5 Jan 2012), although those lost IMF funds might be recouped if Greece settles an agreement for a new third bailout programme with ESM — and passes the first review of such programme.
4 A new third bailout programme worth €86bn in total, jointly covered by funds from IMF and ESM, will be disbursed in tranches from August 2015 until August 2018. The programme was approved to be negotiated on 17 July 2015, and approved in full detail by the publication of an ESM facility agreement on 19 August 2015. IMF's transfer of the "remainder of its frozen I+II programme" and their new commitment also to contribute with a part of the funds for the third bailout, depends on a successful prior completion of the first review of the new third programme in October 2015. Due to a matter of urgency, EFSM immediately conducted a temporary €7.16bn emergency transfer to Greece on 20 July 2015, which was fully overtaken by ESM when the first tranche of the third program was conducted 20 August 2015. Due to being temporary bridge financing and not part of an official bailout programme, the table do not display this special type of EFSM transfer.
The loans of the program has an average maturity of 32.5 years and carry a variable interest rate (currently at 1%). The program has earmarked transfer of up till €25bn for bank recapitalization purposes (to be used to the extent deemed needed by the annual stress tests of European Banking Supervision), and also include establishment of a new privatization fund to conduct sale of Greek public assets — of which the first generated €25bn will be used for early repayment of the bailout loans earmarked for bank recapitalizations. Potential debt relief for Greece, in the form of longer grace and payment periods, will be considered by the European public creditors after the first review of the new programme, by October/November 2015.
5 Hungary recovered faster than expected, and thus did not receive the remaining €4.4bn bailout support scheduled for October 2009-October 2010. IMF paid in total 7.6 out of 10.5 billion SDR, equal to €9.1bn out of €12.5bn at current exchange rates.
6 In Ireland the National Treasury Management Agency also paid €17.5bn for the program on behalf of the Irish government, of which €10bn were injected by the National Pensions Reserve Fund and the remaining €7.5bn paid by "domestic cash resources", which helped increase the program total to €85bn. As this extra amount by technical terms is an internal bail-in, it has not been added to the bailout total. As of 31 March 2014 all committed funds had been transferred, with EFSF even paying €0.7bn more, so that the total amount of funds had been marginally increased from €67.5bn to €68.2bn.
7 Latvia recovered faster than expected, and thus did not receive the remaining €3.0bn bailout support originally scheduled for 2011.
8 Portugal completed its support programme as scheduled in June 2014, one month later than initially planned due to awaiting a verdict by its constitutional court, but without asking for establishment of any subsequent precautionary credit line facility. By the end of the programme all committed amounts had been transferred, except for the last tranche of €2.6bn (1.7bn from EFSM and 0.9bn from IMF), which the Portuguese government declined to receive. The reason why the IMF transfers still mounted to slightly more than the initially committed €26bn, was due to its payment with SDR's instead of euro — and some favorable developments in the EUR-SDR exchange rate compared to the beginning of the programme. In November 2014, Portugal received its last delayed €0.4bn tranche from EFSM (post programme), hereby bringing its total drawn bailout amount up at €76.8bn out of €79.0bn.
9 Romania recovered faster than expected, and thus did not receive the remaining €1.0bn bailout support originally scheduled for 2011.
10 Romania had a precautionary credit line with €5.0bn available to draw money from if needed, during the period March 2011-June 2013; but entirely avoided to draw on it. During the period, the World Bank however supported with a transfer of €0.4bn as a DPL3 development loan programme and €0.75bn as results based financing for social assistance and health.
11 Romania had a second €4bn precautionary credit line established jointly by IMF and EU, of which IMF accounts for SDR 1.75134bn = €2bn, which is available to draw money from if needed during the period from October 2013 to 30 September 2015. In addition the World Bank also made €1bn available under a Development Policy Loan with a deferred drawdown option valid from January 2013 through December 2015. The World Bank will throughout the period also continue providing earlier committed development programme support of €0.891bn, but this extra transfer is not accounted for as "bailout support" in the third programme due to being "earlier committed amounts". In April 2014, the World Bank increased their support by adding the transfer of a first €0.75bn Fiscal Effectiveness and Growth Development Policy Loan, with the final second FEG-DPL tranch on €0.75bn (worth about $1bn) to be contracted in the first part of 2015. No money had been drawn from the precautionary credit line, as of May 2014.
12 Spain's €100bn support package has been earmarked only for recapitalisation of the financial sector. Initially an EFSF emergency account with €30bn was available, but nothing was drawn, and it was cancelled again in November 2012 after being superseded by the regular ESM recapitalisation programme. The first ESM recapitalisation tranch of €39.47bn was approved 28 November, and transferred to the bank recapitalisation fund of the Spanish government (FROB) on 11 December 2012. A second tranch for "category 2" banks on €1.86n was approved by the Commission on 20 December, and finally transferred by ESM on 5 February 2013. "Category 3" banks were also subject for a possible third tranch in June 2013, in case they failed before then to acquire sufficient additional capital funding from private markets. During January 2013, all "category 3" banks however managed to fully recapitalise through private markets and thus will not be in need for any State aid. The remaining €58.7bn of the initial support package is thus not expected to be activated, but will stay available as a fund with precautionary capital reserves to possibly draw upon if unexpected things happen — until 31 December 2013. In total €41.3bn out of the available €100bn was transferred. Upon the scheduled exit of the programme, no follow-up assistance was requested.

==== European Financial Stability Facility (EFSF) ====
On 9 May 2010, the 27 EU member states agreed to create the European Financial Stability Facility, a legal instrument aiming at preserving financial stability in Europe, by providing financial assistance to eurozone states in difficulty. The EFSF can issue bonds or other debt instruments on the market with the support of the German Debt Management Office to raise the funds needed to provide loans to eurozone countries in financial troubles, recapitalise banks or buy sovereign debt.

Emissions of bonds are backed by guarantees given by the euro area member states in proportion to their share in the paid-up capital of the European Central Bank. The €440 billion lending capacity of the facility is jointly and severally guaranteed by the eurozone countries' governments and may be combined with loans up to €60 billion from the European Financial Stabilisation Mechanism (reliant on funds raised by the European Commission using the EU budget as collateral) and up to €250 billion from the International Monetary Fund (IMF) to obtain a financial safety net up to €750 billion.

The EFSF issued €5 billion of five-year bonds in its inaugural benchmark issue 25 January 2011, attracting an order book of €44.5 billion. This amount is a record for any sovereign bond in Europe, and €24.5 billion more than the European Financial Stabilisation Mechanism (EFSM), a separate European Union funding vehicle, with a €5 billion issue in the first week of January 2011.

On 29 November 2011, the member state finance ministers agreed to expand the EFSF by creating certificates that could guarantee up to 30% of new issues from troubled euro-area governments, and to create investment vehicles that would boost the EFSF's firepower to intervene in primary and secondary bond markets.

The transfers of bailout funds were performed in tranches over several years and were conditional on the governments simultaneously implementing a package of fiscal consolidation, structural reforms, privatization of public assets and setting up funds for further bank recapitalization and resolution.

Reception by financial markets

Stocks surged worldwide after the EU announced the EFSF's creation. The facility eased fears that the Greek debt crisis would spread, and this led to some stocks rising to the highest level in a year or more. The euro made its biggest gain in 18 months, before falling to a new four-year low a week later. Shortly after the euro rose again as hedge funds and other short-term traders unwound short positions and carry trades in the currency. Commodity prices also rose following the announcement.

The dollar Libor held at a nine-month high. Default swaps also fell. The VIX closed down a record almost 30%, after a record weekly rise the preceding week that prompted the bailout. The agreement is interpreted as allowing the ECB to start buying government debt from the secondary market, which is expected to reduce bond yields. As a result, Greek bond yields fell sharply from over 10% to just over 5%. Asian bonds yields also fell with the EU bailout.

Usage of EFSF funds

The EFSF only raises funds after an aid request is made by a country. As of the end of July 2012, it has been activated various times. In November 2010, it financed €17.7 billion of the total €67.5 billion rescue package for Ireland (the rest was loaned from individual European countries, the European Commission and the IMF). In May 2011 it contributed one-third of the €78 billion package for Portugal. As part of the second bailout for Greece, the loan was shifted to the EFSF, amounting to €164 billion (130bn new package plus 34.4bn remaining from Greek Loan Facility) throughout 2014. On 20 July 2012, European finance ministers sanctioned the first tranche of a partial bailout worth up to €100 billion for Spanish banks. This leaves the EFSF with €148 billion or an equivalent of €444 billion in leveraged firepower.

The EFSF is set to expire in 2013, running some months parallel to the permanent €500 billion rescue funding program called the European Stability Mechanism (ESM), which will start operating as soon as member states representing 90% of the capital commitments have ratified it. (see section: ESM)

On 13 January 2012, Standard & Poor's downgraded France and Austria from AAA rating, lowered Spain, Italy (and five other) euro members further. Shortly after, S&P also downgraded the EFSF from AAA to AA+.

==== European Financial Stabilisation Mechanism (EFSM) ====
On 5 January 2011, the European Union created the European Financial Stabilisation Mechanism (EFSM), an emergency funding programme reliant upon funds raised on the financial markets and guaranteed by the European Commission using the budget of the European Union as collateral. It runs under the supervision of the Commission and aims at preserving financial stability in Europe by providing financial assistance to EU member states in economic difficulty. The Commission fund, backed by all 27 European Union members, has the authority to raise up to €60 billion and is rated AAA by Fitch, Moody's and Standard & Poor's.

Under the EFSM, the EU successfully placed in the capital markets an €5 billion issue of bonds as part of the financial support package agreed for Ireland, at a borrowing cost for the EFSM of 2.59%.

Like the EFSF, the EFSM was replaced by the permanent rescue funding programme ESM, which was launched in September 2012.

==== Brussels agreement and aftermath ====
On 26 October 2011, leaders of the 17 eurozone countries met in Brussels and agreed on a 50% write-off of Greek sovereign debt held by banks, a fourfold increase (to about €1 trillion) in bail-out funds held under the European Financial Stability Facility, an increased mandatory level of 9% for bank capitalisation within the EU and a set of commitments from Italy to take measures to reduce its national debt. Also pledged was €35 billion in "credit enhancement" to mitigate losses likely to be suffered by European banks. European Commission president José Manuel Barroso characterised the package as a set of "exceptional measures for exceptional times".

The package's acceptance was put into doubt on 31 October when Greek Prime Minister George Papandreou announced that a referendum would be held so that the Greek people would have the final say on the bailout, upsetting financial markets. On 3 November 2011 the promised Greek referendum on the bailout package was withdrawn by Prime Minister Papandreou.

In late 2011, Landon Thomas in the New York Times noted that some, at least, European banks were maintaining high dividend payout rates and none were getting capital injections from their governments even while being required to improve capital ratios. Thomas quoted Richard Koo, an economist based in Japan, an expert on that country's banking crisis, and specialist in balance sheet recessions, as saying:

I do not think Europeans understand the implications of a systemic banking crisis. ... When all banks are forced to raise capital at the same time, the result is going to be even weaker banks and an even longer recession—if not depression. ... Government intervention should be the first resort, not the last resort.

Beyond equity issuance and debt-to-equity conversion, then, one analyst "said that as banks find it more difficult to raise funds, they will move faster to cut down on loans and unload lagging assets" as they work to improve capital ratios. This latter contraction of balance sheets "could lead to a depression", the analyst said. Reduced lending was a circumstance already at the time being seen in a "deepen[ing] crisis" in commodities trade finance in western Europe.

Final agreement on the second bailout package

In a marathon meeting on 20/21 February 2012 the Eurogroup agreed with the IMF and the Institute of International Finance on the final conditions of the second bailout package worth €130 billion. The lenders agreed to increase the nominal haircut from 50% to 53.5%. EU Member States agreed to an additional retroactive lowering of the interest rates of the Greek Loan Facility to a level of just 150 basis points above Euribor. Furthermore, governments of Member States where central banks currently hold Greek government bonds in their investment portfolio commit to pass on to Greece an amount equal to any future income until 2020. Altogether this should bring down Greece's debt to between 117% and 120.5% of GDP by 2020.

=== European Central Bank ===
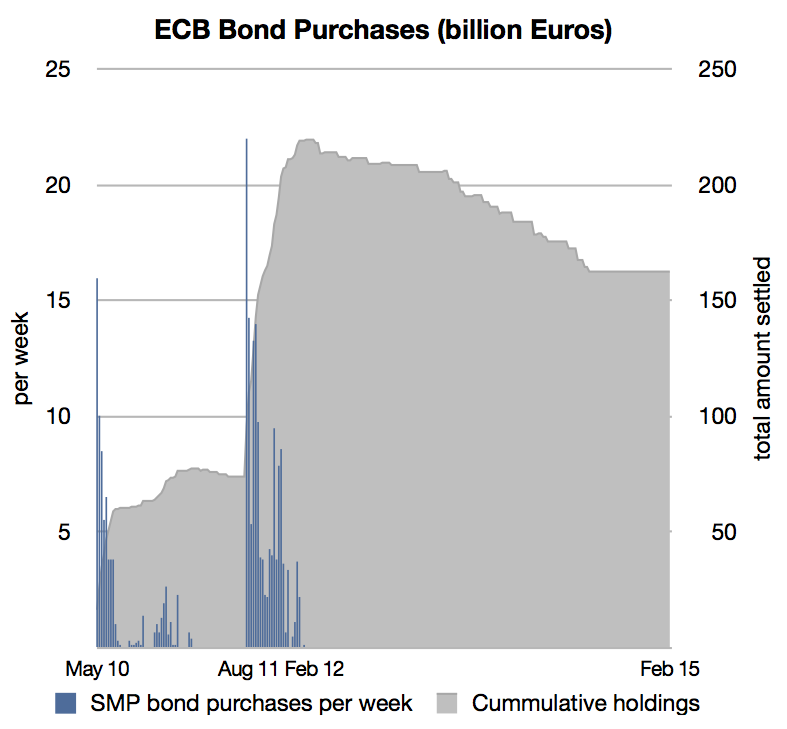
ECB Securities Markets Program (SMP) covering bond purchases since May 2010

The European Central Bank (ECB) has taken a series of measures aimed at reducing volatility in the financial markets and at improving liquidity.

In May 2010 it took the following actions:

- It began open market operations buying government and private debt securities, reaching €219.5 billion in February 2012, though it simultaneously absorbed the same amount of liquidity to prevent a rise in inflation. According to Rabobank economist Elwin de Groot, there is a "natural limit" of €300 billion the ECB can sterilise.
- It reactivated the dollar swap lines with Federal Reserve support.
- It changed its policy regarding the necessary credit rating for loan deposits, accepting as collateral all outstanding and new debt instruments issued or guaranteed by the Greek government, regardless of the nation's credit rating.

The move took some pressure off Greek government bonds, which had just been downgraded to junk status, making it difficult for the government to raise money on capital markets.

On 30 November 2011, the ECB, the US Federal Reserve, the central banks of Canada, Japan, Britain and the Swiss National Bank provided global financial markets with additional liquidity to ward off the debt crisis and to support the real economy. The central banks agreed to lower the cost of dollar currency swaps by 50 basis points to come into effect on 5 December 2011. They also agreed to provide each other with abundant liquidity to make sure that commercial banks stay liquid in other currencies.

With the aim of boosting the recovery in the eurozone economy by lowering interest rates for businesses, the ECB cut its bank rates in multiple steps in 2012–2013, reaching an historic low of 0.25% in November 2013. The lowered borrowing rates have also caused the euro to fall in relation to other currencies, which is hoped will boost exports from the eurozone and further aid the recovery.

With inflation falling to 0.5% in May 2014, the ECB again took measures to stimulate the eurozone economy, which grew at just 0.2% during the first quarter of 2014. (Deflation or very low inflation encourages holding cash, causing a decrease in purchases). On 5 June, the central bank cut the prime interest rate to 0.15%, and set the deposit rate at −0.10%. The latter move in particular was seen as "a bold and unusual move", as a negative interest rate had never been tried on a wide-scale before. Additionally, the ECB announced it would offer long-term four-year loans at the cheap rate (normally the rate is primarily for overnight lending), but only if the borrowing banks met strict conditions designed to ensure the funds ended up in the hands of businesses instead of, for example, being used to buy low risk government bonds. Collectively, the moves are aimed at avoiding deflation, devaluing the euro to make exportation more viable, and at increasing "real world" lending.

Stock markets reacted strongly to the ECB rate cuts. The German DAX index, for example, set a record high the day the new rates were announced. Meanwhile, the euro briefly fell to a four-month low against the dollar. However, due to the unprecedented nature of the negative interest rate, the long-term effects of the stimulus measures are hard to predict. Bank president Mario Draghi signalled the central bank was willing to do whatever it takes to turn around the eurozone economies, remarking "Are we finished? The answer is no". He laid the groundwork for large-scale bond repurchasing, a controversial idea known as quantitative easing.

Resignations

In September 2011, Jürgen Stark became the second German after Axel A. Weber to resign from the ECB Governing Council in 2011. Weber, the former Deutsche Bundesbank president, was once thought to be a likely successor to Jean-Claude Trichet as bank president. He and Stark were both thought to have resigned due to "unhappiness with the ECB's bond purchases, which critics say erode the bank's independence". Stark was "probably the most hawkish" member of the council when he resigned. Weber was replaced by his Bundesbank successor Jens Weidmann, while Belgium's Peter Praet took Stark's original position, heading the ECB's economics department.

Long Term Refinancing Operation (LTRO)

On 22 December 2011, the ECB started the biggest infusion of credit into the European banking system in the euro's 13-year history. Under its Long Term Refinancing Operations (LTROs) it loaned €489 billion to 523 banks for an exceptionally long period of three years at a rate of just one per cent. Previous refinancing operations matured after three, six, and twelve months. The by far biggest amount of €325 billion was tapped by banks in Greece, Ireland, Italy and Spain.

This way the ECB tried to make sure that banks have enough cash to pay off €200 billion of their own maturing debts in the first three months of 2012, and at the same time keep operating and loaning to businesses so that a credit crunch does not choke off economic growth. It also hoped that banks would use some of the money to buy government bonds, effectively easing the debt crisis. On 29 February 2012, the ECB held a second auction, LTRO2, providing 800 eurozone banks with further €529.5 billion in cheap loans. Net new borrowing under the €529.5 billion February auction was around €313 billion; out of a total of €256 billion existing ECB lending (MRO + 3m&6m LTROs), €215 billion was rolled into LTRO2.

ECB lending has largely replaced inter-bank lending. Spain has €365 billion and Italy has €281 billion of borrowings from the ECB (June 2012 data). Germany has €275 billion on deposit.

Reorganization of the European banking system

On 16 June 2012 the European Central Bank together with other European leaders hammered out plans for the ECB to become a bank regulator and to form a deposit insurance program to augment national programs. Other economic reforms promoting European growth and employment were also proposed.

Outright Monetary Transactions (OMTs)

On 6 September 2012, the ECB announced to offer additional financial support in the form of some yield-lowering bond purchases (OMT), for all eurozone countries involved in a sovereign state bailout program from EFSF/ESM. A eurozone country can benefit from the program if -and for as long as- it is found to suffer from stressed bond yields at excessive levels; but only at the point of time where the country possesses/regains a complete market access -and only if the country still complies with all terms in the signed Memorandum of Understanding (MoU) agreement. Countries receiving a precautionary programme rather than a sovereign bailout will, by definition, have complete market access and thus qualify for OMT support if also suffering from stressed interest rates on its government bonds. In regards of countries receiving a sovereign bailout (Ireland, Portugal and Greece), they will on the other hand not qualify for OMT support before they have regained complete market access, which will normally only happen after having received the last scheduled bailout disbursement. Despite none OMT programmes were ready to start in September/October, the financial markets straight away took notice of the additionally planned OMT packages from ECB, and started slowly to price-in a decline of both short-term and long-term interest rates in all European countries previously suffering from stressed and elevated interest levels (as OMTs were regarded as an extra potential back-stop to counter the frozen liquidity and highly stressed rates; and just the knowledge about their potential existence in the very near future helped to calm the markets).

=== European Stability Mechanism (ESM) ===
The European Stability Mechanism (ESM) is a permanent rescue funding programme to succeed the temporary European Financial Stability Facility and European Financial Stabilisation Mechanism in July 2012 but it had to be postponed until after the Federal Constitutional Court of Germany had confirmed the legality of the measures on 12 September 2012. The permanent bailout fund entered into force for 16 signatories on 27 September 2012. It became effective in Estonia on 4 October 2012 after the completion of their ratification process.

On 16 December 2010 the European Council agreed a two line amendment to the EU Lisbon Treaty to allow for a permanent bail-out mechanism to be established including stronger sanctions. In March 2011, the European Parliament approved the treaty amendment after receiving assurances that the European Commission, rather than EU states, would play 'a central role' in running the ESM. The ESM is an intergovernmental organisation under public international law. It is located in Luxembourg.

Such a mechanism serves as a "financial firewall". Instead of a default by one country rippling through the entire interconnected financial system, the firewall mechanism can ensure that downstream nations and banking systems are protected by guaranteeing some or all of their obligations. Then the single default can be managed while limiting financial contagion.

=== European Fiscal Compact ===
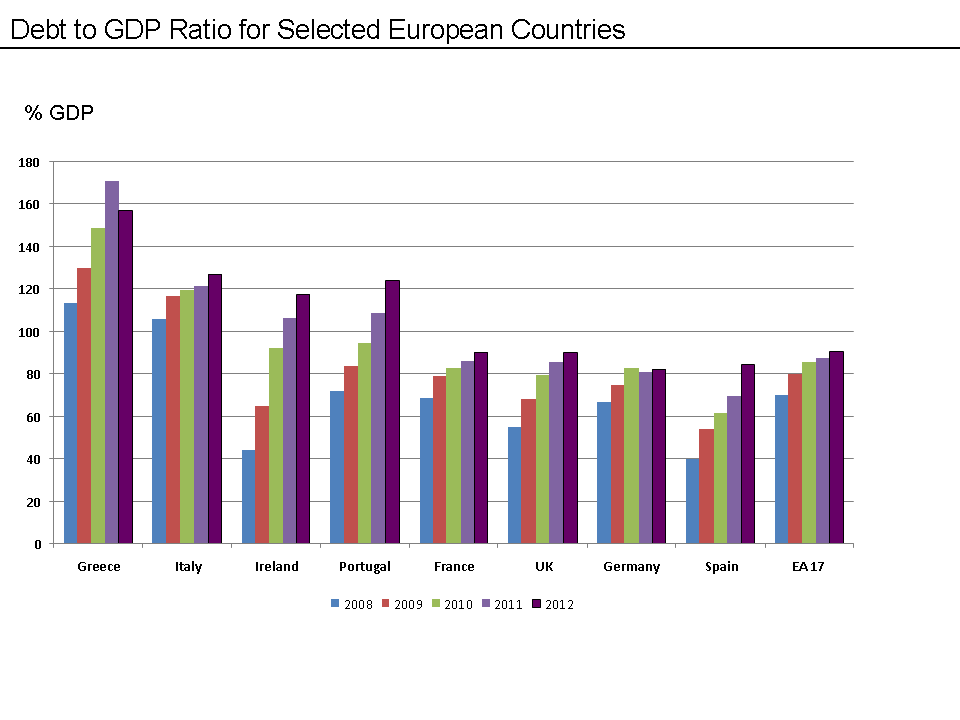
Public debt to GDP ratio for selected eurozone countries and the UK, 2008-2011(source data: Eurostat)

In March 2011 a new reform of the Stability and Growth Pact was initiated, aiming at straightening the rules by adopting an automatic procedure for imposing of penalties in case of breaches of either the 3% deficit or the 60% debt rules. By the end of the year, Germany, France and some other smaller EU countries went a step further and vowed to create a fiscal union across the eurozone with strict and enforceable fiscal rules and automatic penalties embedded in the EU treaties. On 9 December 2011 at the European Council meeting, all 17 members of the eurozone and six countries that aspire to join agreed on a new intergovernmental treaty to put strict caps on government spending and borrowing, with penalties for those countries who violate the limits. All other non-eurozone countries apart from the UK are also prepared to join in, subject to parliamentary vote. The treaty will enter into force on 1 January 2013, if by that time 12 members of the euro area have ratified it.

Originally EU leaders planned to change existing EU treaties but this was blocked by British prime minister David Cameron, who demanded that the City of London be excluded from future financial regulations, including the proposed EU financial transaction tax. By the end of the day, 26 countries had agreed to the plan, leaving the United Kingdom as the only country not willing to join. Cameron subsequently conceded that his action had failed to secure any safeguards for the UK. Britain's refusal to be part of the fiscal compact to safeguard the eurozone constituted a de facto refusal (PM David Cameron vetoed the project) to engage in any radical revision of the Lisbon Treaty. John Rentoul of The Independent concluded that "Any Prime Minister would have done as Cameron did".

== Economic reforms and recovery proposals ==
=== Direct loans to banks and banking regulation ===
On 28 June 2012, eurozone leaders agreed to permit loans by the European Stability Mechanism to be made directly to stressed banks rather than through eurozone states, to avoid adding to sovereign debt. The reform was linked to plans for banking regulation by the European Central Bank. The reform was immediately reflected by a reduction in yield of long-term bonds issued by member states such as Italy and Spain and a rise in value of the Euro.

Country	Banks recapitalised
Portugal	Banco BPI, Caixa Geral de Depositos, Millennium BCP
Ireland	Allied Irish Bank, Anglo Irish Bank, Bank of Ireland
Greece	Alpha Bank, Eurobank, National Bank of Greece, Piraeus Bank
Spain	Banco de Valencia, Bankia, CatalunyaCaixa, Novagalicia

=== Less austerity, more investment ===
There has been substantial criticism over the austerity measures implemented by most European nations to counter this debt crisis. US economist and Nobel laureate Paul Krugman argues that an abrupt return to "'non-Keynesian' financial policies" is not a viable solution. Pointing at historical evidence, he predicts that deflationary policies now being imposed on countries such as Greece and Spain will prolong and deepen their recessions. Together with over 9,000 signatories of "A Manifesto for Economic Sense" Krugman also dismissed the belief of austerity focusing policy makers such as EU economic commissioner Olli Rehn and most European finance ministers that "budget consolidation" revives confidence in financial markets over the longer haul. In a 2003 study that analysed 133 IMF austerity programmes, the IMF's independent evaluation office found that policy makers consistently underestimated the disastrous effects of rigid spending cuts on economic growth. In early 2012 an IMF official, who negotiated Greek austerity measures, admitted that spending cuts were harming Greece. In October 2012, the IMF said that its forecasts for countries which implemented austerity programmes have been consistently overoptimistic, suggesting that tax hikes and spending cuts have been doing more damage than expected, and countries which implemented fiscal stimulus, such as Germany and Austria, did better than expected. Also Portugal did comparably better than Spain. The latter introduced drastic austerity measures but was unable to meet its EU budget deficit targets. On the other hand, Portugal's leftist coalition fought austerity (it increased the minimum wage by 25 percent and took back cuts in the pension system and the public sector) and at the same time reduced its budget deficit to below three percent in 2016. According to historian Florian Schui from University of St. Gallen no austerity program has ever worked. Schui particularly notes Winston Churchill's attempt in 1925 and Heinrich Brüning's attempt in 1930 during the Weimar Republic. Both led to disastrous consequences.

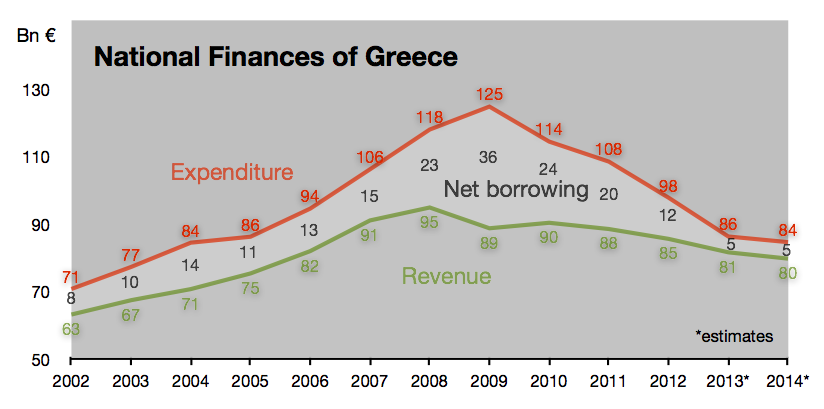
National finances of Greece, 2002-2014

According to Keynesian economists "growth-friendly austerity" relies on the false argument that public cuts would be compensated for by more spending from consumers and businesses, a theoretical claim that has not materialised. The case of Greece shows that excessive levels of private indebtedness and a collapse of public confidence (over 90% of Greeks fear unemployment, poverty and the closure of businesses) led the private sector to decrease spending in an attempt to save up for rainy days ahead. This led to even lower demand for both products and labour, which further deepened the recession and made it ever more difficult to generate tax revenues and fight public indebtedness. According to Financial Times chief economics commentator Martin Wolf, "structural tightening does deliver actual tightening. But its impact is much less than one to one. A one percentage point reduction in the structural deficit delivers a 0.67 percentage point improvement in the actual fiscal deficit". This means that Ireland e.g. would require structural fiscal tightening of more than 12% to eliminate its 2012 actual fiscal deficit. A task that is difficult to achieve without an exogenous eurozone-wide economic boom. According to the Europlus Monitor Report 2012, no country should tighten its fiscal reins by more than 2% of GDP in one year, to avoid recession.

Instead of public austerity, a "growth compact" centring on tax increases and deficit spending is proposed. Since struggling European countries lack the funds to engage in deficit spending, German economist and member of the German Council of Economic Experts Peter Bofinger and Sony Kapoor of the global think tank Re-Define suggest providing €40 billion in additional funds to the European Investment Bank (EIB), which could then lend ten times that amount to the employment-intensive smaller business sector. The EU is currently planning a possible €10 billion increase in the EIB's capital base. Furthermore, the two suggest financing additional public investments by growth-friendly taxes on "property, land, wealth, carbon emissions and the under-taxed financial sector". They also called on EU countries to renegotiate the EU savings tax directive and to sign an agreement to help each other crack down on tax evasion and avoidance. Currently authorities capture less than 1% in annual tax revenue on untaxed wealth transferred between EU members. According to the Tax Justice Network, worldwide, a global super-rich elite had between $21 and $32 trillion (up to 26,000bn Euros) hidden in secret tax havens by the end of 2010, resulting in a tax deficit of up to $280bn.

Apart from arguments over whether or not austerity, rather than increased or frozen spending, is a macroeconomic solution, union leaders have also argued that the working population is being unjustly held responsible for the economic mismanagement errors of economists, investors, and bankers. Over 23 million EU workers have become unemployed as a consequence of the global economic crisis of 2007–2010, and this has led many to call for additional regulation of the banking sector across not only Europe, but the entire world.

After the 2008 financial crisis and the Great Recession, the focus across all EU member states was to gradually to implement austerity measures, with the purpose of lowering the budget deficits to levels below 3% of GDP, so that the debt level would either stay below -or start decline towards- the 60% limit defined by the Stability and Growth Pact. To further restore the confidence in Europe, 23 out of 27 EU countries also agreed to adopt the Euro Plus Pact, consisting of political reforms to improve fiscal strength and competitiveness; 25 out of 27 EU countries also decided to implement the Fiscal Compact which include the commitment of each participating country to introduce a balanced budget amendment as part of their national law/constitution. The Fiscal Compact is a direct successor of the previous Stability and Growth Pact, but it is more strict, not only because criteria compliance will be secured through its integration into national law/constitution, but also because it starting from 2014 will require all ratifying countries not involved in ongoing bailout programmes, to comply with the new strict criteria of only having a structural deficit of either maximum 0.5% or 1% (depending on the debt level). Each of the eurozone countries being involved in a bailout programme (Greece, Portugal, and Ireland) was asked both to follow a programme with fiscal consolidation/austerity, and to restore competitiveness through implementation of structural reforms and internal devaluation, i.e. lowering their relative production costs. The measures implemented to restore competitiveness in the weakest countries are needed, not only to build the foundation for GDP growth, but also in order to decrease the current account imbalances among eurozone member states.

Germany has come under pressure due to not having a government budget deficit and funding it by borrowing more. As of late 2014, the government (federal and state) has spent less than it receives in revenue, for the third year in a row, despite low economic growth. The 2015 budget includes a surplus for the first time since 1969. Current projections are that by 2019 the debt will be less than required by the Stability and Growth Pact.

It has been a long known belief that austerity measures will always reduce the GDP growth in the short term. Some economists believing in Keynesian policies criticised the timing and amount of austerity measures being called for in the bailout programmes, as they argued such extensive measures should not be implemented during the crisis years with an ongoing recession, but if possible delayed until the years after some positive real GDP growth had returned. In October 2012, a report published by International Monetary Fund (IMF) also found, that tax hikes and spending cuts during the most recent decade had indeed damaged the GDP growth more severely, compared to what had been expected and forecasted in advance (based on the "GDP damage ratios" previously recorded in earlier decades and under different economic scenarios). Already a half-year earlier, several European countries as a response to the problem with subdued GDP growth in the eurozone, likewise had called for the implementation of a new reinforced growth strategy based on additional public investments, to be financed by growth-friendly taxes on property, land, wealth, and financial institutions. In June 2012, EU leaders agreed as a first step to moderately increase the funds of the European Investment Bank, in order to kick-start infrastructure projects and increase loans to the private sector. A few months later 11 out of 17 eurozone countries also agreed to introduce a new EU financial transaction tax to be collected from 1 January 2014.

Progress

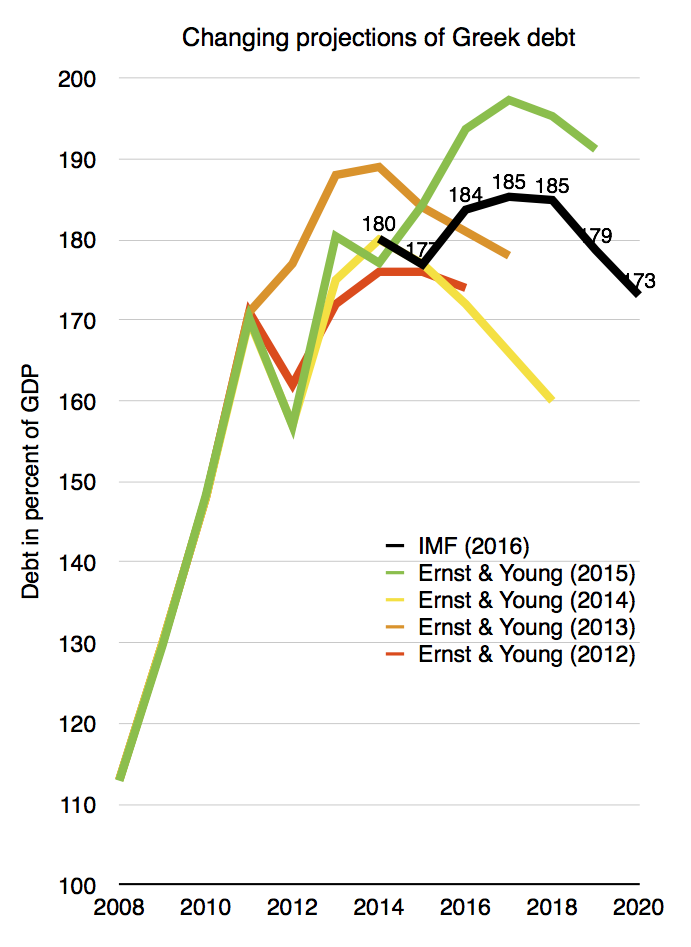
Projections of Greek debt in percent of GDP (2008-2020)

In April 2012, Olli Rehn, the European commissioner for economic and monetary affairs in Brussels, "enthusiastically announced to EU parliamentarians in mid-April that 'there was a breakthrough before Easter'. He said the European heads of state had given the green light to pilot projects worth billions, such as building highways in Greece". Other growth initiatives include "project bonds" wherein the EIB would "provide guarantees that safeguard private investors. In the pilot phase until 2013, EU funds amounting to €230 million are expected to mobilise investments of up to €4.6 billion". Der Spiegel also said: "According to sources inside the German government, instead of funding new highways, Berlin is interested in supporting innovation and programs to promote small and medium-sized businesses. To ensure that this is done as professionally as possible, the Germans would like to see the southern European countries receive their own state-owned development banks, modeled after Germany's [Marshall Plan-era-origin] KfW [Kreditanstalt für Wiederaufbau] banking group. It's hoped that this will get the economy moving in Greece and Portugal".

In multiple steps during 2012–2013, the ECB lowered its bank rate to historical lows, reaching 0.25% in November 2013. Soon after the rates were shaved to 0.15%, then on 4 September 2014 the central bank shocked financial markets by cutting the razor-thin rates by a further two thirds from 0.15% to 0.05%, the lowest on record. The moves were designed to make it cheaper for banks to borrow from the ECB, with the aim that lower cost of money would be passed on to businesses taking out loans, boosting investment in the economy. The lowered borrowing rates caused the euro to fall in relation to other currencies, which it was hoped would boost exports from the eurozone.

=== Increase competitiveness ===
Crisis countries must significantly increase their international competitiveness to generate economic growth and improve their terms of trade. Indian-American journalist Fareed Zakaria notes in November 2011 that no debt restructuring will work without growth, even more so as European countries "face pressures from three fronts: demography (an aging population), technology (which has allowed companies to do much more with fewer people) and globalisation (which has allowed manufacturing and services to locate across the world)".

In case of economic shocks, policy makers typically try to improve competitiveness by depreciating the currency, as in the case of Iceland, which suffered the largest financial crisis in 2008–2011 in economic history but has since vastly improved its position. Eurozone countries cannot devalue their currency.

Internal devaluation

Relative change in unit labour costs, 2000–2017

As a workaround many policy makers try to restore competitiveness through internal devaluation, a painful economic adjustment process, where a country aims to reduce its unit labour costs. German economist Hans-Werner Sinn noted in 2012 that Ireland was the only country that had implemented relative wage moderation in the last five years, which helped decrease its relative price/wage levels by 16%. Greece would need to bring this figure down by 31%, effectively reaching the level of Turkey. By 2012, wages in Greece had been cut to a level last seen in the late 1990s. Purchasing power dropped even more to the level of 1986. Similarly, salaries in Italy fell to 1986 levels and consumption fell to the level of 1950.

Other economists argue that no matter how much Greece and Portugal drive down their wages, they could never compete with low-cost developing countries such as China or India. Instead weak European countries must shift their economies to higher quality products and services, though this is a long-term process and may not bring immediate relief.

Fiscal devaluation

Another option would be to implement fiscal devaluation, based on an idea originally developed by John Maynard Keynes in 1931. According to this neo-Keynesian logic, policy makers can increase the competitiveness of an economy by lowering corporate tax burden such as employer's social security contributions, while offsetting the loss of government revenues through higher taxes on consumption (VAT) and pollution, i.e. by pursuing an ecological tax reform.

Germany has successfully pushed its economic competitiveness by increasing the value added tax (VAT) by three percentage points in 2007, and using part of the additional revenues to lower employer's unemployment insurance contribution. Portugal has taken a similar stance and also France appears to follow this suit. In November 2012 French president François Hollande announced plans to reduce tax burden of the corporate sector by €20 billion within three years, while increasing the standard VAT from 19.6% to 20% and introducing additional eco-taxes in 2016. To minimise negative effects of such policies on purchasing power and economic activity the French government will partly offset the tax hikes by decreasing employees' social security contributions by €10 billion and by reducing the lower VAT for convenience goods (necessities) from 5.5% to 5%.

Progress

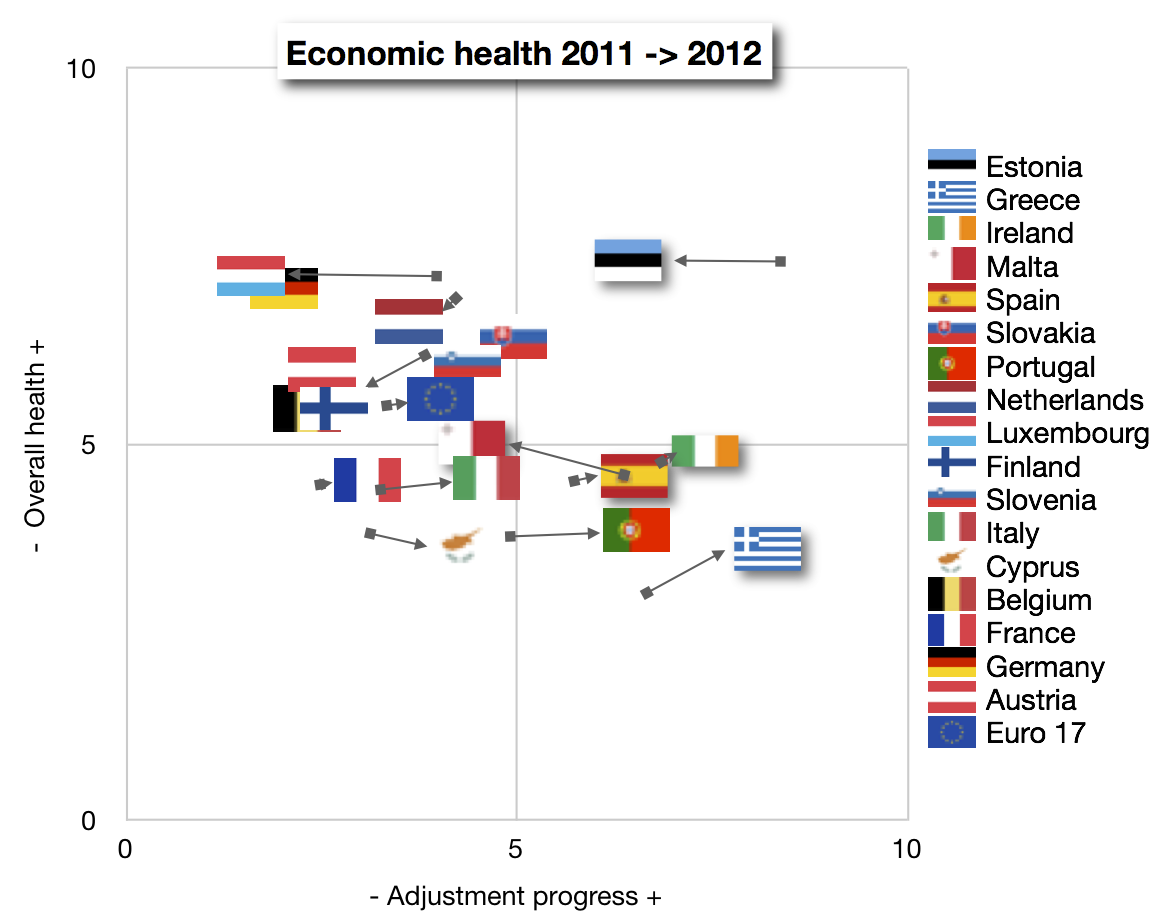
Eurozone economic health and adjustment progress 2011–2012 (source: Euro Plus Monitor)

On 15 November 2011, the Lisbon Council published the Euro Plus Monitor 2011. According to the report most critical eurozone member countries are in the process of rapid reforms. The authors note that "Many of those countries most in need to adjust [...] are now making the greatest progress towards restoring their fiscal balance and external competitiveness". Greece, Ireland and Spain are among the top five reformers and Portugal is ranked seventh among 17 countries included in the report (see graph).

In its Euro Plus Monitor Report 2012, published in November 2012, the Lisbon Council finds that the eurozone has slightly improved its overall health. With the exception of Greece, all eurozone crisis countries are either close to the point where they have achieved the major adjustment or are likely to get there over the course of 2013. Portugal and Italy are expected to progress to the turnaround stage in spring 2013, possibly followed by Spain in autumn, while the fate of Greece continues to hang in the balance. Overall, the authors suggest that if the eurozone gets through the current acute crisis and stays on the reform path "it could eventually emerge from the crisis as the most dynamic of the major Western economies".

The Euro Plus Monitor update from spring 2013 notes that the eurozone remains on the right track. According to the authors, almost all vulnerable countries in need of adjustment "are slashing their underlying fiscal deficits and improving their external competitiveness at an impressive speed", for which they expected the eurozone crisis to be over by the end of 2013.

=== Address current account imbalances ===
Current account imbalances (1998–2014)

Animated graph of current account imbalances since 1999

Regardless of the corrective measures chosen to solve the current predicament, as long as cross border capital flows remain unregulated in the euro area, current account imbalances are likely to continue. A country that runs a large current account or trade deficit (i.e., importing more than it exports) must ultimately be a net importer of capital; this is a mathematical identity called the balance of payments. In other words, a country that imports more than it exports must either decrease its savings reserves or borrow to pay for those imports. Conversely, Germany's large trade surplus (net export position) means that it must either increase its savings reserves or be a net exporter of capital, lending money to other countries to allow them to buy German goods.

The 2009 trade deficits for Italy, Spain, Greece, and Portugal were estimated to be $42.96bn, $75.31bn and $35.97bn, and $25.6bn respectively, while Germany's trade surplus was $188.6bn. A similar imbalance exists in the US, which runs a large trade deficit (net import position) and therefore is a net borrower of capital from abroad. Ben Bernanke warned of the risks of such imbalances in 2005, arguing that a "savings glut" in one country with a trade surplus can drive capital into other countries with trade deficits, artificially lowering interest rates and creating asset bubbles.

A country with a large trade surplus would generally see the value of its currency appreciate relative to other currencies, which would reduce the imbalance as the relative price of its exports increases. This currency appreciation occurs as the importing country sells its currency to buy the exporting country's currency used to purchase the goods. Alternatively, trade imbalances can be reduced if a country encouraged domestic saving by restricting or penalising the flow of capital across borders, or by raising interest rates, although this benefit is likely offset by slowing down the economy and increasing government interest payments.

Either way, many of the countries involved in the crisis are on the euro, so devaluation, individual interest rates, and capital controls are not available. The only solution left to raise a country's level of saving is to reduce budget deficits and to change consumption and savings habits. For example, if a country's citizens saved more instead of consuming imports, this would reduce its trade deficit. It has therefore been suggested that countries with large trade deficits (e.g., Greece) consume less and improve their exporting industries. On the other hand, export driven countries with a large trade surplus, such as Germany, Austria and the Netherlands would need to shift their economies more towards domestic services and increase wages to support domestic consumption.

Economic evidence indicates the crisis may have more to do with trade deficits (which require private borrowing to fund) than public debt levels. Economist Paul Krugman wrote in March 2013: "... the really strong relationship within the [eurozone countries] is between interest spreads and current account deficits, which is in line with the conclusion many of us have reached, that the euro area crisis is really a balance of payments crisis, not a debt crisis". A February 2013 paper from four economists concluded that, "Countries with debt above 80% of GDP and persistent current-account [trade] deficits are vulnerable to a rapid fiscal deterioration..".

Progress

In its spring 2012 economic forecast, the European Commission finds "some evidence that the current-account rebalancing is underpinned by changes in relative prices and competitiveness positions as well as gains in export market shares and expenditure switching in deficit countries". In May 2012 German finance minister Wolfgang Schäuble has signalled support for a significant increase in German wages to help decrease current account imbalances within the eurozone.

According to the Euro Plus Monitor Report 2013, the collective current account of Greece, Ireland, Italy, Portugal, and Spain is improving rapidly and is expected to balance by mid 2013. Thereafter these countries as a group would no longer need to import capital. In 2014, the current account surplus of the eurozone as a whole almost doubled compared to the previous year, reaching a new record high of 227.9bn Euros.

=== Mobilisation of credit ===
Several proposals were made in mid-2012 to purchase the debt of distressed European countries such as Spain and Italy. Markus Brunnermeier, the economist Graham Bishop, and Daniel Gros were among those advancing proposals. Finding a formula, which was not simply backed by Germany, is central in crafting an acceptable and effective remedy.

== Proposed long-term solutions ==
The key policy issue that has to be addressed in the long run is how to harmonise different political-economic institutional set-ups of the north and south European economies to promote economic growth and make the currency union sustainable. The Eurozone member states must adopt structural reforms, aimed at promoting labour market mobility and wage flexibility, restoring the south's economies’ competitiveness by increasing their productivity.

At the same time, it is vital to keep in mind that just putting emphasis on emulating LME's wage-setting system to CMEs and mixed-market economies will not work. Therefore, apart from wage issues, structural reforms should be focused on developing capacities for innovations, technologies, education, R&D, etc., i.e. all institutional subsystems, crucial for firms' success. In economies of the south special attention should be given to creating less labour-intensive industries to avoid price competition pressure from emerging low-cost countries (such as China) via an exchange rate channel, and providing a smooth transition of workers from old unsustainable industries to new ones based on the so-called Nordic-style ‘flexicurity’ market model.

=== European fiscal union ===
The crisis is pressuring Europe to move beyond a regulatory state and towards a more federal EU with fiscal powers. Increased European integration giving a central body increased control over the budgets of member states was proposed on 14 June 2012 by Jens Weidmann, President of the Deutsche Bundesbank, expanding on ideas first proposed by Jean-Claude Trichet, former president of the European Central Bank. Control, including requirements that taxes be raised or budgets cut, would be exercised only when fiscal imbalances developed. This proposal is similar to contemporary calls by Angela Merkel for increased political and fiscal union which would "allow Europe oversight possibilities".

=== European bank recovery and resolution authority ===
European banks are estimated to have incurred losses approaching €1 trillion between 2007 and 2010. The European Commission approved some €4.5 billion in state aid for banks between October 2008 and October 2011, a sum which includes the value of taxpayer-funded recapitalisations and public guarantees on banking debts. This prompted some economists such as Joseph Stiglitz and Paul Krugman to note that Europe is not suffering from a sovereign debt crisis but rather from a banking crisis.

On 6 June 2012, the European Commission adopted a legislative proposal for a harmonised bank recovery and resolution mechanism. The proposed framework sets out the necessary steps and powers to ensure that bank failures across the EU are managed in a way that avoids financial instability. The new legislation would give member states the power to impose losses, resulting from a bank failure, on the bondholders to minimise costs for taxpayers. The proposal is part of a new scheme in which banks will be compelled to "bail-in" their creditors whenever they fail, the basic aim being to prevent taxpayer-funded bailouts in the future. The public authorities would also be given powers to replace the management teams in banks even before the lender fails. Each institution would also be obliged to set aside at least one per cent of the deposits covered by their national guarantees for a special fund to finance the resolution of banking crisis starting in 2018.

=== Eurobonds ===
A growing number of investors and economists said that eurobonds would be the best way of solving a debt crisis, though their introduction matched by tight financial and budgetary co-ordination might well require changes in EU treaties. On 21 November 2011, the European Commission suggested that eurobonds issued jointly by the 17 euro nations would be an effective way to deal with the financial crisis. Using the term "stability bonds", Jose Manuel Barroso insisted that any such plan would have to be matched by tight fiscal surveillance and economic policy coordination as an essential counterpart so as to avoid moral hazard and ensure sustainable public finances.

Germany remains largely opposed at least in the short term to a collective takeover of the debt of states that have run excessive budget deficits and borrowed excessively over the past years.

=== European Safe Bonds ===
A group of economists from Princeton University suggest a new form of European Safe Bonds (ESBies), i.e. bundled European government bonds (70% senior bonds, 30% junior bonds) in the form of a "union-wide safe asset without joint liability". According to the authors, ESBies "would be at least as safe as German bonds and approximately double the supply of euro safe assets when protected by a 30%-thick junior tranche". ESBies could be issued by public or private-sector entities and would "weaken the diabolic loop and its diffusion across countries". It requires "no significant change in treaties or legislation.“

In 2017 the idea was picked up by the European Central Bank. The European Commission has also shown interest and plans to include ESBies in a future white paper dealing with the aftermath of the financial crisis. The European Commission has recently introduced a proposal to introduce what it calls Sovereign Bond Backed Securities (SBBS) which are essentially the same as ESBies and the European Parliament endorsed the changes in regulations necessary to facilitate these securities in April 2019.

=== European Monetary Fund ===
On 20 October 2011, the Austrian Institute of Economic Research published an article that suggests transforming the EFSF into a European Monetary Fund (EMF), which could provide governments with fixed interest rate Eurobonds at a rate slightly below medium-term economic growth (in nominal terms). These bonds would not be tradable but could be held by investors with the EMF and liquidated at any time. Given the backing of all eurozone countries and the ECB, "the EMU would achieve a similarly strong position vis-à-vis financial investors as the US where the Fed backs government bonds to an unlimited extent". To ensure fiscal discipline despite lack of market pressure, the EMF would operate according to strict rules, providing funds only to countries that meet fiscal and macroeconomic criteria. Governments lacking sound financial policies would be forced to rely on traditional (national) governmental bonds with less favourable market rates.

The econometric analysis suggests that "If the short-term and long- term interest rates in the euro area were stabilised at 1.5% and 3%, respectively, aggregate output (GDP) in the euro area would be 5 percentage points above baseline in 2015". At the same time, sovereign debt levels would be significantly lower with, e.g., Greece's debt level falling below 110% of GDP, more than 40 percentage points below the baseline scenario with market-based interest levels. Furthermore, banks would no longer be able to benefit unduly from intermediary profits by borrowing from the ECB at low rates and investing in government bonds at high rates.

=== Debt write-off financed by wealth tax ===
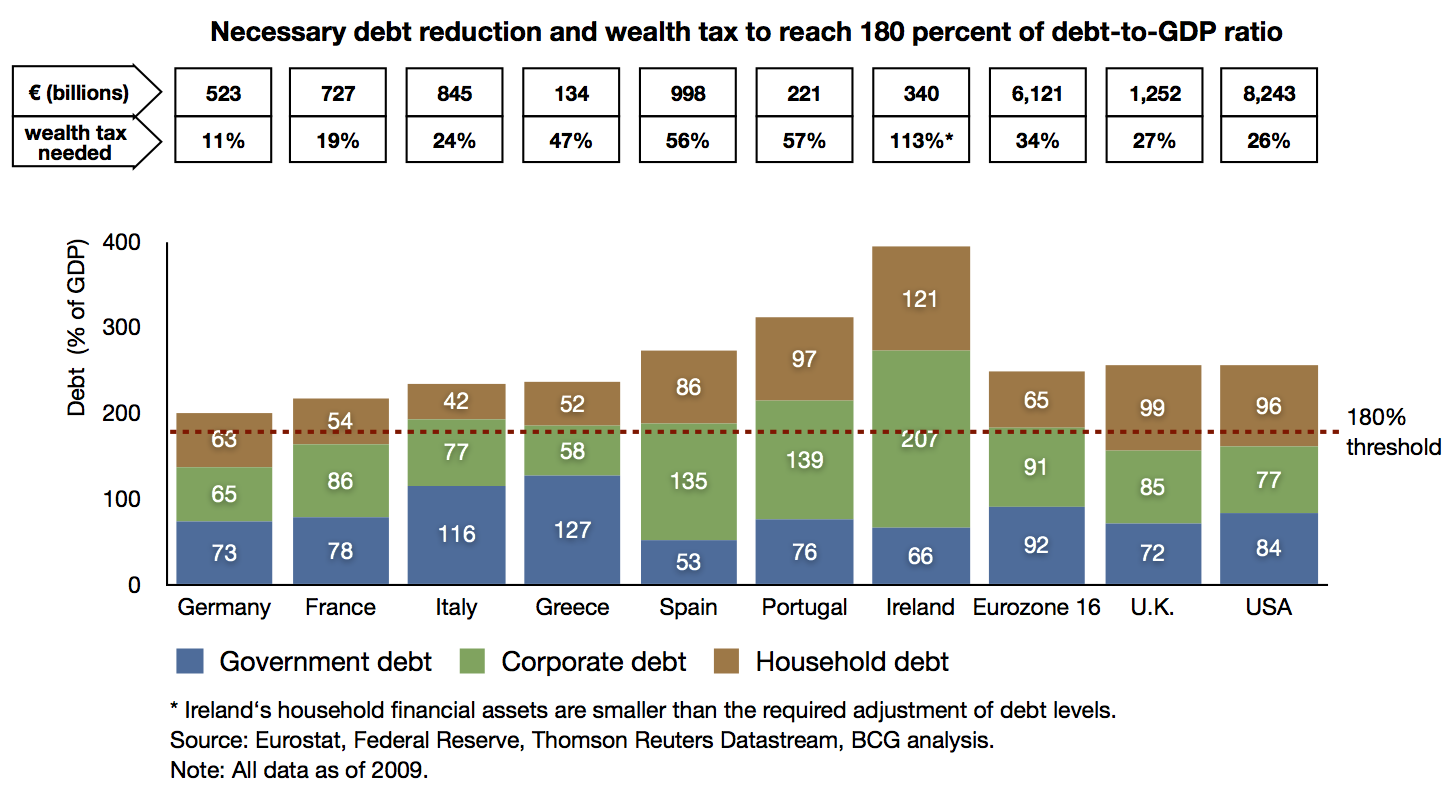
Overall debt levels in 2009 and write-offs necessary in the eurozone, UK and US to reach sustainable grounds.

According to the Bank for International Settlements, the combined private and public debt of 18 OECD countries nearly quadrupled between 1980 and 2010, and will likely continue to grow, reaching between 250% (for Italy) and about 600% (for Japan) by 2040. A BIS study released in June 2012 warns that budgets of most advanced economies, excluding interest payments, "would need 20 consecutive years of surpluses exceeding 2 per cent of gross domestic product—starting now—just to bring the debt-to-GDP ratio back to its pre-crisis level". The same authors found in a previous study that increased financial burden imposed by ageing populations and lower growth makes it unlikely that indebted economies can grow out of their debt problem if only one of the following three conditions is met:

- government debt is more than 80 to 100% of GDP;
- non-financial corporate debt is more than 90% of GDP;
- private household debt is more than 85% of GDP.

The first condition, suggested by an influential paper written by Kenneth Rogoff & Carmen Reinhart has been disputed due to major calculation errors. In fact, the average GDP growth at public debt/GDP ratios over 90% is not dramatically different from when debt/GDP ratios are lower.

The Boston Consulting Group (BCG) adds that if the overall debt load continues to grow faster than the economy, then large-scale debt restructuring becomes inevitable. To prevent a vicious upward debt spiral from gaining momentum the authors urge policymakers to "act quickly and decisively" and aim for an overall debt level well below 180% for the private and government sector. This number is based on the assumption that governments, non-financial corporations, and private households can each sustain a debt load of 60% of GDP, at an interest rate of five per cent and a nominal economic growth rate of three per cent per year. Lower interest rates and/or higher growth would help reduce the debt burden further.

To reach sustainable levels the eurozone must reduce its overall debt level by €6.1 trillion. According to BCG, this could be financed by a one-time wealth tax of between 11 and 30% for most countries, apart from the crisis countries (particularly Ireland) where a write-off would have to be substantially higher. The authors admit that such programmes would be "drastic", "unpopular" and "require broad political coordination and leadership" but they maintain that the longer politicians and central bankers wait, the more necessary such a step will be.

Thomas Piketty, French economist and author of the bestselling book Capital in the Twenty-First Century regards taxes on capital as a more favourable option than austerity (inefficient and unjust) and inflation (only affects cash but neither real estates nor business capital). According to his analysis, a flat tax of 15 percent on private wealth would provide the state with nearly a year's worth national income, which would allow for immediate reimbursement of the entire public debt.

Instead of a one-time write-off, German economist Harald Spehl has called for a 30-year debt-reduction plan, similar to the one Germany used after World War II to share the burden of reconstruction and development. Similar calls have been made by political parties in Germany including the Greens and The Left.

=== Debt write-off based on international agreement ===
In 2015 Hans-Werner Sinn, president of German Ifo Institute for Economic Research, called for a debt relief for Greece. In addition, economists from London School of Economics suggested a debt relief similar to the London agreement. In 1953, private sector lenders as well as governments agreed to write off about half of West Germany’s outstanding debt; this was followed by the beginning of Germany's "economic miracle" (or Wirtschaftswunder). According to this agreement, West Germany had to make repayments only when it was running a trade surplus, that is "when it had earned the money to pay up, rather than having to borrow more, or dip into its foreign currency reserves. Its repayments were also limited to 3% of export earnings". As LSE researchers note, this had the effect that, Germany's creditors had an incentive to buy the country's goods, so that it would be able to afford to pay them.

== Controversies ==
The European bailouts are largely about shifting exposure from banks and others, who otherwise are lined up for losses on the sovereign debt they have piled up, onto European taxpayers.

=== EU treaty violations ===
No bail-out clause

The EU's Maastricht Treaty contains juridical language that appears to rule out intra-EU bailouts. First, the "no bail-out" clause (Article 125 TFEU) ensures that the responsibility for repaying public debt remains national and prevents risk premiums caused by unsound fiscal policies from spilling over to partner countries. The clause thus encourages prudent fiscal policies at the national level.

The European Central Bank's purchase of distressed country bonds can be viewed as violating the prohibition of monetary financing of budget deficits (Article 123 TFEU). The creation of further leverage in EFSF with access to ECB lending would also appear to violate the terms of this article.

Articles 125 and 123 were meant to create disincentives for EU member states to run excessive deficits and state debt, and prevent the moral hazard of over-spending and lending in good times. They were also meant to protect the taxpayers of the other more prudent member states. By issuing bail-out aid guaranteed by prudent eurozone taxpayers to rule-breaking eurozone countries such as Greece, the EU and eurozone countries also encourage moral hazard in the future. While the no bail-out clause remains in place, the "no bail-out doctrine" seems to be a thing of the past.

Convergence criteria

The EU treaties contain so called convergence criteria, specified in the protocols of the Treaties of the European Union. As regards government finance, the states agreed that the annual government budget deficit should not exceed 3% of gross domestic product (GDP) and that the gross government debt to GDP should not exceed 60% of GDP (see protocol 12 and 13). For eurozone members there is the Stability and Growth Pact, which contains the same requirements for budget deficit and debt limitation but with a much stricter regime. In the past, many European countries have substantially exceeded these criteria over a long period of time. Around 2005 most eurozone members violated the pact, resulting in no action taken against violators.

==== Credit rating agencies ====
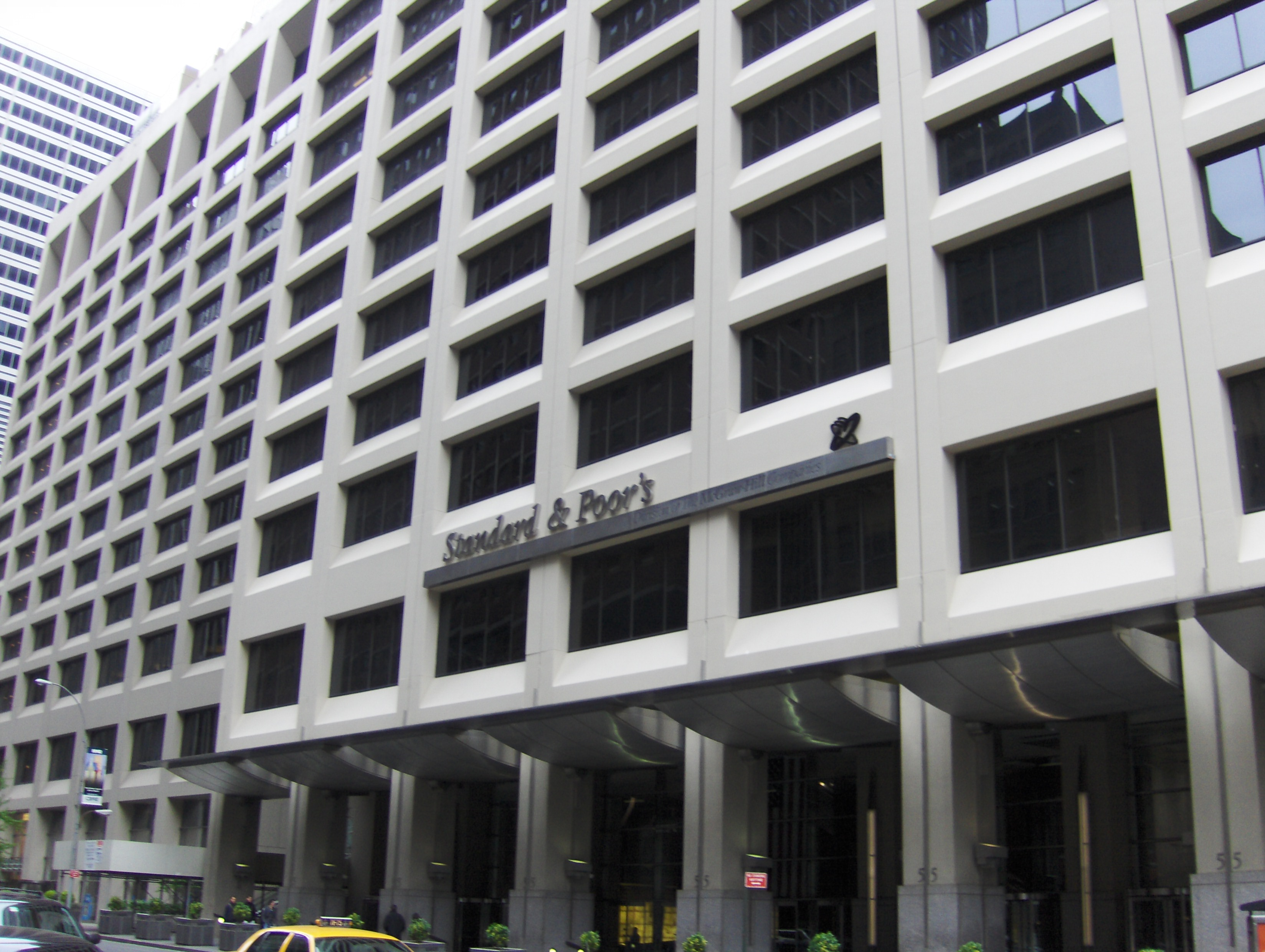
Standard & Poor's Headquarters in Lower Manhattan, New York City

The international US-based credit rating agencies—Moody's, Standard & Poor's and Fitch—which have already been under fire during the housing bubble and the Icelandic crisis—have also played a central and controversial role in the current European bond market crisis. On one hand, the agencies have been accused of giving overly generous ratings due to conflicts of interest. On the other hand, ratings agencies have a tendency to act conservatively, and to take some time to adjust when a firm or country is in trouble. In the case of Greece, the market responded to the crisis before the downgrades, with Greek bonds trading at junk levels several weeks before the ratings agencies began to describe them as such.

According to a study by economists at St Gallen University credit rating agencies have fuelled rising euro zone indebtedness by issuing more severe downgrades since the sovereign debt crisis unfolded in 2009. The authors concluded that rating agencies were not consistent in their judgments, on average rating Portugal, Ireland, and Greece 2.3 notches lower than under pre-crisis standards, eventually forcing them to seek international aid. On a side note: as of the end of November 2013 only three countries in the eurozone retain AAA ratings from Standard & Poor, (i.e. Germany, Finland and Luxembourg.)

European policy makers have criticised ratings agencies for acting politically, accusing the Big Three of bias towards European assets and fuelling speculation. Particularly Moody's decision to downgrade Portugal's foreign debt to the category Ba2 "junk" has infuriated officials from the EU and Portugal alike. State-owned utility and infrastructure companies like ANA – Aeroportos de Portugal, Energias de Portugal, Redes Energéticas Nacionais, and Brisa – Auto-estradas de Portugal were also downgraded despite claims to having solid financial profiles and significant foreign revenue.

French central bank chief Christian Noyer criticised the decision of Standard & Poor's to lower the rating of France but not that of the United Kingdom, which "has more deficits, as much debt, more inflation, less growth than us".

Similar comments were made by high-ranking politicians in Germany. Michael Fuchs, deputy leader of the leading Christian Democrats, said: "Standard and Poor's must stop playing politics. Why doesn't it act on the highly indebted United States or highly indebted Britain?", adding that the latter's collective private and public sector debts are the largest in Europe. He further added: "If the agency downgrades France, it should also downgrade Britain in order to be consistent".

Credit rating agencies were also accused of bullying politicians by systematically downgrading eurozone countries just before important European Council meetings. As one EU source put it: "It is interesting to look at the downgradings and the timings of the downgradings... It is strange that we have so many downgrades in the weeks of summits".

Regulatory reliance on credit ratings

Think-tanks such as the World Pensions Council (WPC) have criticised European powers such as France and Germany for pushing for the adoption of the Basel II recommendations, adopted in 2005 and transposed in European Union law through the Capital Requirements Directive (CRD), effective since 2008. In essence, this forced European banks and more importantly the European Central Bank, e.g. when gauging the solvency of EU-based financial institutions, to rely heavily on the standardised assessments of credit risk marketed by only two private US firms- Moody's and S&P.

Counter measures

Due to the failures of the ratings agencies, European regulators obtained new powers to supervise ratings agencies. With the creation of the European Supervisory Authority in January 2011 the EU set up a whole range of new financial regulatory institutions, including the European Securities and Markets Authority (ESMA), which became the EU's single credit-ratings firm regulator. Credit-ratings companies have to comply with the new standards or will be denied operation on EU territory, says ESMA Chief Steven Maijoor.

Germany's foreign minister Guido Westerwelle called for an "independent" European ratings agency, which could avoid the conflicts of interest that he claimed US-based agencies faced. European leaders are reportedly studying the possibility of setting up a European ratings agency in order that the private US-based ratings agencies have less influence on developments in European financial markets in the future. According to German consultant company Roland Berger, setting up a new ratings agency would cost €300 million. On 30 January 2012, the company said it was already collecting funds from financial institutions and business intelligence agencies to set up an independent non-profit ratings agency by mid-2012, which could provide its first country ratings by the end of the year. In April 2012, in a similar attempt, the Bertelsmann Stiftung presented a blueprint for establishing an international non-profit credit rating agency (INCRA) for sovereign debt, structured in way that management and rating decisions are independent from its financiers.

But attempts to regulate credit rating agencies more strictly in the wake of the eurozone crisis have been rather unsuccessful. World Pensions Council (WPC) financial law and regulation experts have argued that the hastily drafted, unevenly transposed in national law, and poorly enforced EU rule on ratings agencies (Regulation EC N° 1060/2009) has had little effect on the way financial analysts and economists interpret data or on the potential for conflicts of interests created by the complex contractual arrangements between credit rating agencies and their clients"

==== Influence of Anglo-Saxon media coverage ====
Some in the Greek, Spanish, and French press and elsewhere spread conspiracy theories that claimed that the U.S. and Britain were deliberately promoting rumours about the euro in order to cause its collapse or to distract attention from their own economic vulnerabilities. The Economist rebutted these "Anglo-Saxon conspiracy" claims, writing that although American and British traders overestimated the weakness of southern European public finances and the probability of the breakup of the eurozone, these sentiments were an ordinary market panic, rather than some deliberate plot.

Greek Prime Minister Papandreou is quoted as saying that there was no question of Greece leaving the euro and suggested that the crisis was politically as well as financially motivated. "This is an attack on the eurozone by certain other interests, political or financial". The Spanish Prime Minister José Luis Rodríguez Zapatero has also suggested that the recent financial market crisis in Europe is an attempt to undermine the euro. He ordered the Centro Nacional de Inteligencia intelligence service (National Intelligence Centre, CNI in Spanish) to investigate the role of the "Anglo-Saxon media" in fomenting the crisis. So far, no results have been reported from this investigation.

Other commentators believe that the euro is under attack so that countries, such as the UK and the US, can continue to fund their large external deficits and government deficits, and to avoid the collapse of the US$. The US and UK do not have large domestic savings pools to draw on and therefore are dependent on external savings e.g. from China. This is not the case in the eurozone, which is self-funding.

==== Speculators ====
Both the Spanish and Greek Prime Ministers have accused financial speculators and hedge funds of worsening the crisis by short selling euros. German chancellor Merkel has stated that "institutions bailed out with public funds are exploiting the budget crisis in Greece and elsewhere".

Goldman Sachs and other banks faced an inquiry by the Federal Reserve over their derivatives arrangements with Greece. The Guardian reported that "Goldman was reportedly the most heavily involved of a dozen or so Wall Street banks" that assisted the Greek government in the early 2000s "to structure complex derivatives deals early in the decade and 'borrow' billions of dollars in exchange rate swaps, which did not officially count as debt under eurozone rules". Critics of the bank's conduct said that these deals "contributed to unsustainable public finances" which in turn destabilized the eurozone.

In response to accusations that speculators were worsening the problem, some markets banned naked short selling for a few months.

=== Speculation about the break-up of the eurozone ===
Some economists, mostly from outside Europe and associated with Modern Monetary Theory and other post-Keynesian schools, condemned the design of the euro currency system from the beginning because it ceded national monetary and economic sovereignty but lacked a central fiscal authority. When faced with economic problems, they maintained, "Without such an institution, EMU would prevent effective action by individual countries and put nothing in its place". US economist Martin Feldstein went so far to call the euro "an experiment that failed". Some non-Keynesian economists, such as Luca A. Ricci of the IMF, contend that the eurozone does not fulfil the necessary criteria for an optimum currency area, though it is moving in that direction.

As the debt crisis expanded beyond Greece, these economists continued to advocate, albeit more forcefully, the disbandment of the eurozone. If this was not immediately feasible, they recommended that Greece and the other debtor nations unilaterally leave the eurozone, default on their debts, regain their fiscal sovereignty, and re-adopt national currencies. Bloomberg suggested in June 2011 that, if the Greek and Irish bailouts should fail, an alternative would be for Germany to leave the eurozone to save the currency through depreciation instead of austerity. The likely substantial fall in the euro against a newly reconstituted Deutsche Mark would give a "huge boost" to its members' competitiveness.

Iceland, not part of the EU, is regarded as one of Europe's recovery success stories. It defaulted on its debt and drastically devalued its currency, which has effectively reduced wages by 50% making exports more competitive. Lee Harris argues that floating exchange rates allows wage reductions by currency devaluations, a politically easier option than the economically equivalent but politically impossible method of lowering wages by political enactment. Sweden's floating rate currency gives it a short-term advantage, structural reforms and constraints account for longer-term prosperity. Labour concessions, a minimal reliance on public debt, and tax reform helped to further a pro-growth policy.

British discount retailer Poundland chose the name Dealz and not "Euroland" for its 2011 expansion into Ireland because, CEO Jim McCarthy said, "'Eurozone' ... is usually reported in association with bad news — job losses, debts and increased taxes". His company planned to use Dealz in continental Europe; McCarthy stated that "There is less certainty about the longevity [of the currency union] now". The Wall Street Journal conjectured as well that Germany could return to the Deutsche Mark, or create another currency union with the Netherlands, Austria, Finland, Luxembourg and other European countries such as Denmark, Norway, Sweden, Switzerland, and the Baltics. A monetary union of these countries with current account surpluses would create the world's largest creditor bloc, bigger than China or Japan. The Wall Street Journal added that without the German-led bloc, a residual euro would have the flexibility to keep interest rates low and engage in quantitative easing or fiscal stimulus in support of a job-targeting economic policy instead of inflation targeting in the current configuration.

Breakup vs. deeper integration

There is opposition in this view. The national exits are expected to be an expensive proposition. The breakdown of the currency would lead to insolvency of several euro zone countries, a breakdown in intrazone payments. Having instability and the public debt issue still not solved, the contagion effects and instability would spread into the system. Having that the exit of Greece would trigger the breakdown of the eurozone, this is not welcomed by many politicians, economists and journalists. According to Steven Erlanger from The New York Times, a "Greek departure is likely to be seen as the beginning of the end for the whole euro zone project, a major accomplishment, whatever its faults, in the post-War construction of a Europe "whole and at peace". Likewise, the two big leaders of the Euro zone, German Chancellor Angela Merkel and former French president Nicolas Sarkozy have said on numerous occasions that they would not allow the eurozone to disintegrate and have linked the survival of the Euro with that of the entire European Union. In September 2011, EU commissioner Joaquín Almunia shared this view, saying that expelling weaker countries from the euro was not an option: "Those who think that this hypothesis is possible just do not understand our process of integration". The former ECB president Jean-Claude Trichet also denounced the possibility of a return of the Deutsche Mark.

The challenges to the speculation about the break-up or salvage of the eurozone is rooted in its innate nature that the break-up or salvage of eurozone is not only an economic decision but also a critical political decision followed by complicated ramifications that "If Berlin pays the bills and tells the rest of Europe how to behave, it risks fostering destructive nationalist resentment against Germany and ... it would strengthen the camp in Britain arguing for an exit—a problem not just for Britons but for all economically liberal Europeans. Solutions which involve greater integration of European banking and fiscal management and supervision of national decisions by European umbrella institutions can be criticised as Germanic domination of European political and economic life. According to US author Ross Douthat "This would effectively turn the European Union into a kind of postmodern version of the old Austro-Hungarian Empire, with a Germanic elite presiding uneasily over a polyglot imperium and its restive local populations".

The Economist provides a somewhat modified approach to saving the euro in that "a limited version of federalisation could be less miserable solution than break-up of the euro". The recipe to this tricky combination of the limited federalisation, greatly lies on mutualisation for limiting the fiscal integration. In order for overindebted countries to stabilise the dwindling euro and economy, the overindebted countries require "access to money and for banks to have a "safe" euro-wide class of assets that is not tied to the fortunes of one country" which could be obtained by "narrower Eurobond that mutualises a limited amount of debt for a limited amount of time". The proposition made by German Council of Economic Experts provides detailed blue print to mutualise the current debts of all euro-zone economies above 60% of their GDP. Instead of the break-up and issuing new national governments bonds by individual euro-zone governments, "everybody, from Germany (debt: 81% of GDP) to Italy (120%) would issue only these joint bonds until their national debts fell to the 60% threshold. The new mutualised-bond market, worth some €2.3 trillion, would be paid off over the next 25 years. Each country would pledge a specified tax (such as a VAT surcharge) to provide the cash." So far, German Chancellor Angela Merkel has opposed all forms of mutualisation.

The Hungarian-American business magnate George Soros warns in "Does the Euro have a Future?" that there is no escape from the "gloomy scenario" of a prolonged European recession and the consequent threat to the Eurozone's political cohesion so long as "the authorities persist in their current course". He argues that to save the Euro long-term structural changes are essential in addition to the immediate steps needed to arrest the crisis. The changes he recommends include even greater economic integration of the European Union. Soros writes that a treaty is needed to transform the European Financial Stability Fund into a full-fledged European Treasury. Following the formation of the Treasury, the European Council could then authorise the ECB to "step into the breach", with risks to the ECB's solvency being indemnified. Soros acknowledges that converting the EFSF into a European Treasury will necessitate "a radical change of heart". In particular, he cautions, Germans will be wary of any such move, not least because many continue to believe that they have a choice between saving the Euro and abandoning it. Soros writes that a collapse of the European Union would precipitate an uncontrollable financial meltdown and thus "the only way" to avert "another Great Depression" is the formation of a European Treasury.

=== Odious debt ===
Some protesters, commentators such as Libération correspondent Jean Quatremer and the Liège-based NGO Committee for the Abolition of the Third World Debt (CADTM) allege that the debt should be characterised as odious debt. The Greek documentary Debtocracy, and a book of the same title and content examine whether the recent Siemens scandal and uncommercial ECB loans which were conditional on the purchase of military aircraft and submarines are evidence that the loans amount to odious debt and that an audit would result in invalidation of a large amount of the debt.

=== Manipulation of public finances statistics ===
The revision of Greece's 2009 budget deficit from a forecast of "6–8% of GDP" to 15.4% in 2010 was the key trigger for the Greek debt crisis. However accusations of the use of "creative accounting" by several other governments have been raised the United Kingdom, Spain, the United States, and even Germany.

=== Collateral for Finland ===
On 18 August 2011, as requested by the Finnish parliament as a condition for any further bailouts, it became apparent that Finland would receive collateral from Greece, enabling it to participate in the potential new €109 billion support package for the Greek economy. Austria, the Netherlands, Slovenia, and Slovakia responded with irritation over this special guarantee for Finland and demanded equal treatment across the eurozone, or a similar deal with Greece, so as not to increase the risk level over their participation in the bailout. The main point of contention was that the collateral is aimed to be a cash deposit, a collateral the Greeks can only give by recycling part of the funds loaned by Finland for the bailout, which means Finland and the other eurozone countries guarantee the Finnish loans in the event of a Greek default. Finland's recommendation to the crisis countries is to issue asset-backed securities to cover the immediate need, a tactic successfully used in Finland's early 1990s recession, in addition to spending cuts and bad banking.

After extensive negotiations to implement a collateral structure open to all eurozone countries, on 4 October 2011, a modified escrow collateral agreement was reached. The expectation is that only Finland will utilise it, due, in part, to a requirement to contribute initial capital to European Stability Mechanism in one instalment instead of five instalments over time. Finland, as one of the strongest AAA countries, can raise the required capital with relative ease.

In February 2012, the four largest Greek banks agreed to provide the €880 million in collateral to Finland to secure the second bailout programme.

== Political impact ==
Unscheduled change of governments in Euro countries (marked red) due to crisis

The handling of the crisis has led to the premature end of several European national governments and influenced the outcome of many elections:

- Ireland – February 2011 – After a high deficit in the government's budget in 2010 and the uncertainty surrounding the proposed bailout from the International Monetary Fund, the 30th Dáil (parliament) collapsed the following year, which led to a subsequent general election, collapse of the preceding government parties, Fianna Fáil and the Green Party, the resignation of the Taoiseach Brian Cowen and the rise of the Fine Gael party, which formed a government alongside the Labour Party in the 31st Dáil, which led to a change of government and the appointment of Enda Kenny as Taoiseach.
- Portugal – March 2011 – Following the failure of parliament to adopt the government austerity measures, PM José Sócrates and his government resigned, bringing about early elections in June 2011.
- Finland – April 2011 – The approach to the Portuguese bailout and the EFSF dominated the April 2011 election debate and formation of the subsequent government.
- Spain – July 2011 – Following the failure of the Spanish government to handle the economic situation, PM José Luis Rodríguez Zapatero announced early elections in November. "It is convenient to hold elections this fall so a new government can take charge of the economy in 2012, fresh from the balloting," he said. Following the elections, Mariano Rajoy became PM.
- Slovenia – September 2011 – Following the failure of June referendums on measures to combat the economic crisis and the departure of coalition partners, the Borut Pahor government lost a motion of confidence and December 2011 early elections were set, following which Janez Janša became PM. After a year of rigorous saving measures, and also due to continuous opening of ideological question, the centre-right government of Janez Janša was ousted on 27 February 2013 by nomination of Alenka Bratušek as the PM-designated of a new centre-left coalition government.
- Slovakia – October 2011 – In return for the approval of the EFSF by her coalition partners, PM Iveta Radičová had to concede early elections in March 2012, following which Robert Fico became PM.
- Italy – November 2011 – Following market pressure on government bond prices in response to concerns about levels of debt, the right-wing cabinet, of the long-time prime minister Silvio Berlusconi, lost its majority: Berlusconi resigned on 12 November and four days later was replaced by the technocratic government of Mario Monti.
- Greece – November 2011 – After intense criticism from within his own party, the opposition and other EU governments, for his proposal to hold a referendum on the austerity and bailout measures, PM George Papandreou of the PASOK party announced his resignation in favour of a national unity government between three parties, of which only two currently remain in the coalition. Following the vote in the Greek parliament on the austerity and bailout measures, which both leading parties supported but many MPs of these two parties voted against, Papandreou and Antonis Samaras expelled a total of 44 MPs from their respective parliamentary groups, leading to PASOK losing its parliamentary majority. The early Greek legislative election, 2012 were the first time in the history of the country, at which the bipartisanship (consisted of PASOK and New Democracy parties), which ruled the country for over 40 years, collapsed in votes as a punishment for their support to the strict measures proposed by the country's foreign lenders and the Troika (consisted of the European Commission, the IMF and the European Central Bank). The popularity of PASOK dropped from 42.5% in 2010 to as low as 7% in some polls in 2012. The radical right-wing, extreme left-wing, communist and populist political parties that have opposed the policy of strict measures, won the majority of the votes.
- Netherlands – April 2012 – After talks between the VVD, CDA and PVV over a new austerity package of about 14 billion euros failed, the Rutte cabinet collapsed. Early elections were called for 12 September 2012. To prevent fines from the EU – a new budget was demanded by 30 April – five different parties called the Kunduz coalition forged together an emergency budget for 2013 in just two days.
- France – May 2012 – The 2012 French presidential election became the first time since 1981 that an incumbent failed to gain a second term, when Nicolas Sarkozy lost to François Hollande.

== See also ==
- 2000s commodities boom
- 1991 Indian economic crisis
- Stock market crashes in India
- Corporate debt bubble
- Crisis situations and unrest in Europe since 2000
- Federal Reserve Economic Data
- Great Recession
- Great Recession in Europe
- List of stock market crashes and bear markets
- List of acronyms associated with the eurozone crisis
- List of countries by credit rating
- List of people associated with the eurozone crisis
- The Intervention of ECB in the Eurozone Crisis
