= Contagious =

Contagious may refer to:

- Contagious disease

== Literature ==
- Contagious (magazine), a marketing publication
- Contagious (novel), a science fiction thriller novel by Scott Sigler

== Music ==
=== Albums ===
- Contagious (Peggy Scott-Adams album), 1997
- Contagious (Sitti album), 2009
- Contagious (Third Day album), 1994
- Contagious (Y&T album), 1987
- Contagious, a 1987 album by The Bar-Kays
- Contagious, a 2009 album by Tarrus Riley
- Contagious, a 2012 album by Terron Brooks
- Contagious, a 2003 EP by Arena

=== Songs ===
- "Contagious" (song), a 2001 song by The Isley Brothers
- "Contagious" by Anarbor, from the album The Words You Don't Swallow
- "Contagious" by Avril Lavigne, from the album The Best Damn Thing
- "Contagious" by Boys Like Girls, from the album Love Drunk
- "Contagious" by Collective Soul, from the album See What You Started by Continuing
- "Contagious" by Ludacris featuring Jamie Foxx, from the album Theater of the Mind
- "Contagious" by Saving Abel, from the album Miss America
- "Contagious" by Trapt, from the album Only Through the Pain
- "Contagious" by Young Thug, from the album Punk
- "Contagious" by Frankie Laine
- "Contagious" by Learning Music
- "Contagious" by Marc Robillard
- "Contagious" by The Whispers
- "Us" (Regina Spektor song) by Regina Spektor

== Other uses ==
- Contagious (film), a 1997 U.S. film

== See also ==
- Contagious Diseases Acts (UK)
- Contagious Diseases (Animals) Act (UK)
- Contagion (disambiguation)
