= Policy reactions to the eurozone crisis =

Political response to an economic event

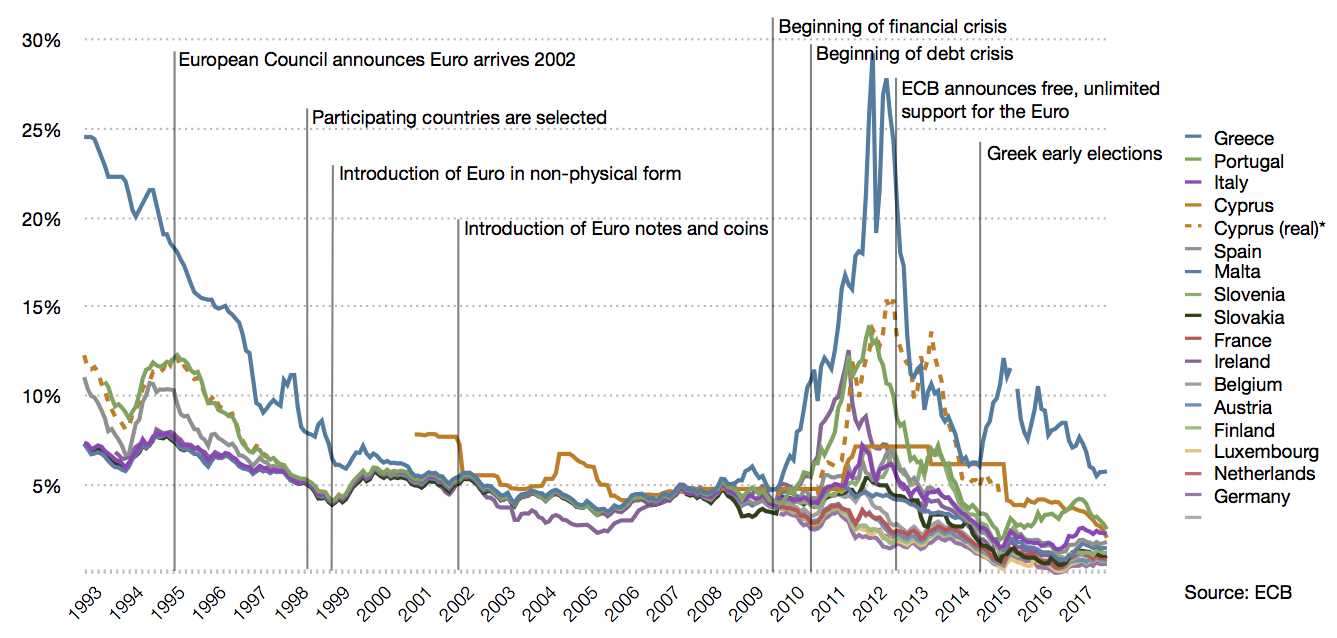
Spread of interest rates in Eurozone countries

The euro area crisis, often also referred to as the eurozone crisis or the European sovereign debt crisis, was a multi-year debt crisis that took place in the European Union (EU) from 2009 until the mid to late 2010s. Several eurozone member states (Greece, Portugal, Ireland and Cyprus) were unable to repay or refinance their government debt or to bail out over-indebted banks under their national supervision without the assistance of other eurozone countries, the European Central Bank (ECB), or the International Monetary Fund (IMF).

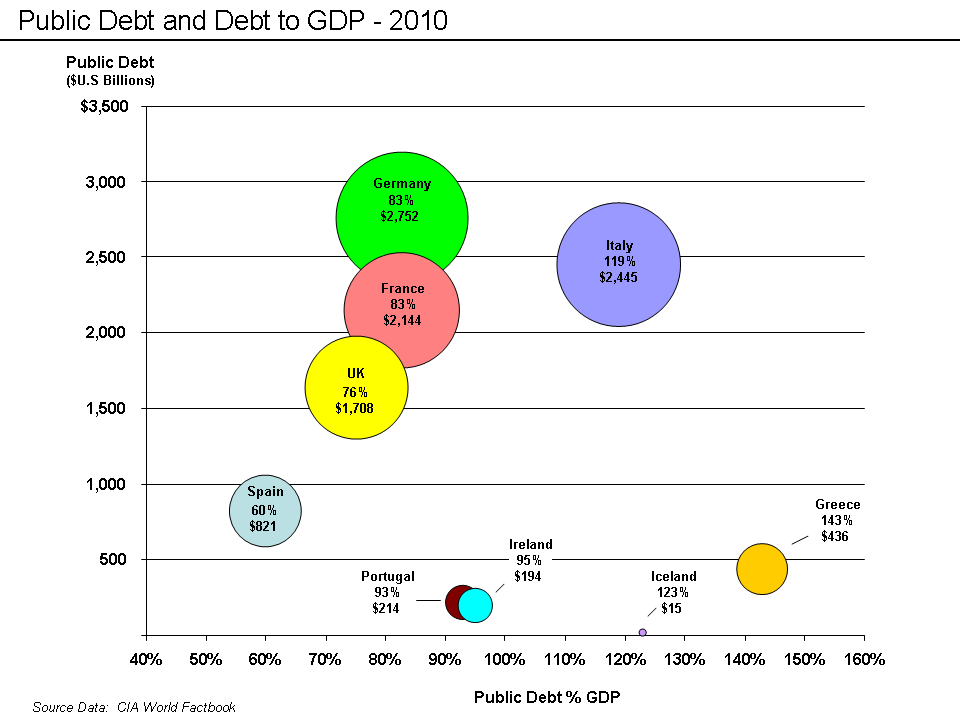
Public debt $ and %GDP (2010) for selected European countries

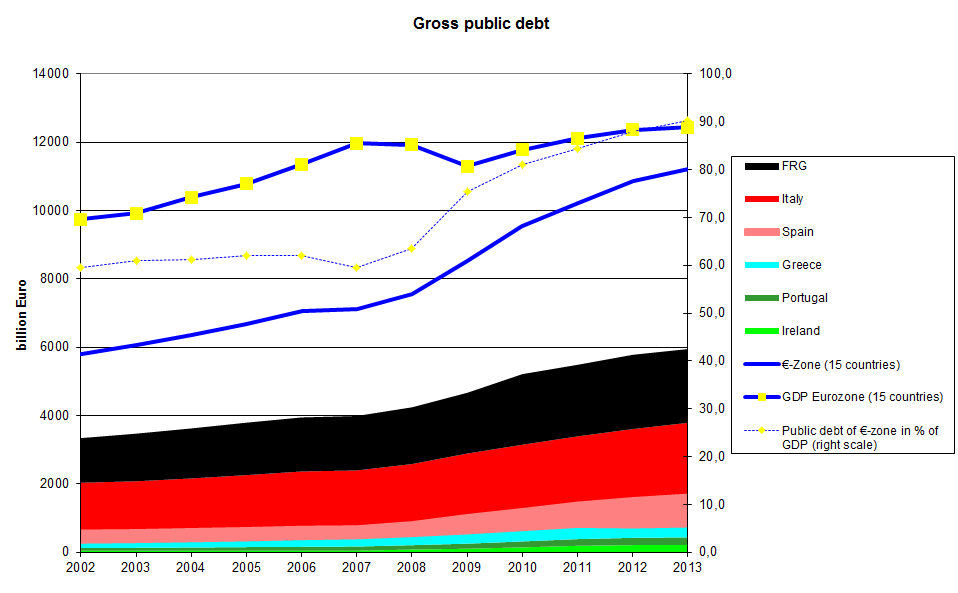
Government debt of Eurozone, Germany and crisis countries compared to Eurozone GDP

The European sovereign debt crisis resulted from a combination of complex factors, including the globalization of finance; easy credit conditions during the 2002–2008 period that encouraged high-risk lending and borrowing practices; the 2008 financial crisis; international trade imbalances; real-estate bubbles that have since burst; the Great Recession; fiscal policy choices related to government revenues and expenses; and approaches used by nations to bail out troubled banking industries and private bondholders, assuming private debt burdens or socializing losses.

One narrative describing the causes of the crisis begins with the significant increase in savings available for investment during the 2000–2007 period when the global pool of fixed-income securities increased from approximately $36 trillion in 2000 to $70 trillion by 2007. This "Giant Pool of Money" increased as savings from high-growth developing nations entered global capital markets. Investors searching for higher yields than those offered by U.S. Treasury bonds sought alternatives globally.

The temptation offered by such readily available savings overwhelmed the policy and regulatory control mechanisms in country after country, as lenders and borrowers put these savings to use, generating bubble after bubble across the globe. While these bubbles have burst, causing asset prices (e.g., housing and commercial property) to decline, the liabilities owed to global investors remain at full price, generating questions regarding the solvency of governments and their banking systems.

How each European country involved in this crisis borrowed and invested the money varies. For example, Ireland's banks lent the money to property developers, generating a massive property bubble. When the bubble burst, Ireland's government and taxpayers assumed private debts. In Greece, the government increased its commitments to public workers in the form of extremely generous wage and pension benefits, with the former doubling in real terms over 10 years. Iceland's banking system grew enormously, creating debts to global investors (external debts) several times GDP.

The three crucial problems of the European economic governance emerged during the crisis are the asymmetry in the policy-making process for centralized policies and decentralized ones, ambiguities related to the coherent functioning of the euro area and the EU as well as of distribution of powers between national institutions and supranational ones, which implies the dilemma of legitimacy of the European economic governance and its rules.

The interconnection in the global financial system means that if one nation defaults on its sovereign debt or enters into recession putting some of the external private debt at risk, the banking systems of creditor nations face losses. For example, in October 2011, Italian borrowers owed French banks $366 billion (net). Should Italy be unable to finance itself, the French banking system and economy could come under significant pressure, which in turn would affect France's creditors and so on. This is referred to as financial contagion. Another factor contributing to interconnection is the concept of debt protection. Institutions entered into contracts called credit default swaps (CDS) that result in payment should default occur on a particular debt instrument (including government issued bonds). But, since multiple CDSs can be purchased on the same security, it is unclear what exposure each country's banking system now has to CDS.

Greece hid its growing debt and deceived EU officials with the help of derivatives designed by major banks. Although some financial institutions clearly profited from the growing Greek government debt in the short run, there was a long lead-up to the crisis.

== EU emergency measures ==
The table below provides an overview of the financial composition of all bailout programs being initiated for EU member states, since the 2008 financial crisis. EU member states outside the eurozone (marked with yellow in the table) have no access to the funds provided by EFSF/ESM, but can be covered with rescue loans from EU's Balance of Payments programme (BoP), IMF and bilateral loans (with an extra possible assistance from the Worldbank/EIB/EBRD if classified as a development country). Since October 2012, the ESM as a permanent new financial stability fund to cover any future potential bailout packages within the eurozone, has effectively replaced the now defunct GLF + EFSM + EFSF funds. Whenever pledged funds in a scheduled bailout program were not transferred in full, the table has noted this by writing "Y out of X".

EU member	Time span	IMF (billion €)	World Bank (billion €)	EIB / EBRD (billion €)	Bilateral (billion €)	BoP (billion €)	GLF (billion €)	EFSM (billion €)	EFSF (billion €)	ESM (billion €)	Bailout in total (billion €)
Cyprus I^{1}	Dec.2011-Dec.2012	–	–	–	2.5	–	–	–	–	–	2.5^{1}
Cyprus II^{2}	May 2013-Mar.2016	1.0	–	–	–	–	–	–	–	6.3 out of 9.0	7.3 out of 10.0^{2}
Greece I+II^{3}	May 2010-Jun.2015	32.1 out of 48.1	–	–	–	–	52.9	–	130.9 out of 144.6	–	215.9 out of 245.6^{3}
Greece III^{4}	Aug.2015-Aug.2018	(proportion of 86, to be decided Oct.2015)	–	–	–	–	–	–	–	(up till 86)	86^{4}
Hungary^{5}	Nov.2008-Oct.2010	9.1 out of 12.5	1.0	–	–	5.5 out of 6.5	–	–	–	–	15.6 out of 20.0^{5}
Ireland^{6}	Nov.2010-Dec.2013	22.5	–	–	4.8	–	–	22.5	18.4	–	68.2^{6}
Latvia^{7}	Dec.2008-Dec.2011	1.1 out of 1.7	0.4	0.1	0.0 out of 2.2	2.9 out of 3.1	–	–	–	–	4.5 out of 7.5^{7}
Portugal^{8}	May 2011-Jun 2014	26.5 out of 27.4	–	–	–	–	–	24.3 out of 25.6	26.0	–	76.8 out of 79.0^{8}
Romania I^{9}	May 2009-Jun 2011	12.6 out of 13.6	1.0	1.0	–	5.0	–	–	–	–	19.6 out of 20.6^{9}
Romania II^{10}	Mar 2011-Jun 2013	0.0 out of 3.6	1.15	–	–	0.0 out of 1.4	–	–	–	–	1.15 out of 6.15^{10}
Romania III^{11}	Oct 2013-Sep 2015	0.0 out of 2.0	2.5	–	–	0.0 out of 2.0	–	–	–	–	2.5 out of 6.5^{11}
Spain^{12}	July 2012-Dec.2013	–	–	–	–	–	–	–	–	41.3 out of 100	41.3 out of 100^{12}
Total payment	Nov.2008-Aug.2018	104.9	6.05	1.1	7.3	13.4	52.9	46.8	175.3	136.3	544.05

1 Cyprus received in late December 2011 a €2.5bn bilateral emergency bailout loan from Russia, to cover its governmental budget deficits and a refinancing of maturing governmental debts until 31 December 2012. Initially the bailout loan was supposed to be fully repaid in 2016, but as part of establishment of the later following second Cypriot bailout programme, Russia accepted a delayed repayment in eight biannual tranches throughout 2018–2021 - while also lowering its requested interest rate from 4.5% to 2.5%.
2 When it became evident Cyprus needed an additional bailout loan to cover the government's fiscal operations throughout 2013–2015, on top of additional funding needs for recapitalization of the Cypriot financial sector, negotiations for such an extra bailout package started with the Troika in June 2012. In December 2012 a preliminary estimate indicated, that the needed overall bailout package should have a size of €17.5bn, comprising €10bn for bank recapitalisation and €6.0bn for refinancing maturing debt plus €1.5bn to cover budget deficits in 2013+2014+2015, which in total would have increased the Cypriot debt-to-GDP ratio to around 140%. The final agreed package however only entailed a €10bn support package, financed partly by IMF (€1bn) and ESM (€9bn), because it was possible to reach a fund saving agreement with the Cypriot authorities, featuring a direct closure of the most troubled Laiki Bank and a forced bail-in recapitalisation plan for Bank of Cyprus.
The final conditions for activation of the bailout package was outlined by the Troika's MoU agreement in April 2013, and include: (1) Recapitalisation of the entire financial sector while accepting a closure of the Laiki bank, (2) Implementation of the anti–money laundering framework in Cypriot financial institutions, (3) Fiscal consolidation to help bring down the Cypriot governmental budget deficit, (4) Structural reforms to restore competitiveness and macroeconomic imbalances, (5) Privatization programme. The Cypriot debt-to-GDP ratio is on this background now forecasted only to peak at 126% in 2015 and subsequently decline to 105% in 2020, and thus considered to remain within sustainable territory. The €10bn bailout comprise €4.1bn spend on debt liabilities (refinancing and amortization), 3.4bn to cover fiscal deficits, and €2.5bn for the bank recapitalization. These amounts will be paid to Cyprus through regular tranches from 13 May 2013 until 31 March 2016. According to the programme this will be sufficient, as Cyprus during the programme period in addition will: Receive €1.0bn extraordinary revenue from privatization of government assets, ensure an automatic roll-over of €1.0bn maturing Treasury Bills and €1.0bn of maturing bonds held by domestic creditors, bring down the funding need for bank recapitalization with €8.7bn — of which 0.4bn is reinjection of future profit earned by the Cyprus Central Bank (injected in advance at the short term by selling its gold reserve) and €8.3bn origin from the bail-in of creditors in Laiki bank and Bank of Cyprus. The forced automatic rollover of maturing bonds held by domestic creditors were conducted in 2013, and equaled according to some credit rating agencies a "selective default" or "restrictive default", mainly because the fixed yields of the new bonds did not reflect the market rates — while maturities at the same time automatically were extended. Cyprus successfully concluded its three-year financial assistance programme at the end of March 2016, having borrowed a total of €6.3 billion from the European Stability Mechanism and €1 billion from the International Monetary Fund. The remaining €2.7 billion of the ESM bailout was never dispensed, due to the Cypriot government's better than expected finances over the course of the programme.
3 Many sources list the first bailout was €110bn followed by the second on €130bn. When you deduct €2.7bn due to Ireland+Portugal+Slovakia opting out as creditors for the first bailout, and add the extra €8.2bn IMF has promised to pay Greece for the years in 2015-16 (through a programme extension implemented in December 2012), the total amount of bailout funds sums up to €245.6bn. The first bailout resulted in a payout of €20.1bn from IMF and €52.9bn from GLF, during the course of May 2010 until December 2011, and then it was technically replaced by a second bailout package for 2012-2016, which had a size of €172.6bn (€28bn from IMF and €144.6bn from EFSF), as it included the remaining committed amounts from the first bailout package. All committed IMF amounts were made available to the Greek government for financing its continued operation of public budget deficits and to refinance maturing public debt held by private creditors and IMF. The payments from EFSF were earmarked to finance €35.6bn of PSI restructured government debt (as part of a deal where private investors in return accepted a nominal haircut, lower interest rates and longer maturities for their remaining principal), €48.2bn for bank recapitalization, €11.3bn for a second PSI debt buy-back, while the remaining €49.5bn were made available to cover continued operation of public budget deficits. The combined programme was scheduled to expire in March 2016, after IMF had extended their programme period with extra loan tranches from January 2015 to March 2016 (as a mean to help Greece service the total sum of interests accruing during the lifespan of already issued IMF loans), while the Eurogroup at the same time opted to conduct their reimbursement and deferral of interests outside their bailout programme framework — with the EFSF programme still being planned to end in December 2014.
Due to the refusal by the Greek government to comply with the agreed conditional terms for receiving a continued flow of bailout transfers, both IMF and the Eurogroup opted to freeze their programmes since August 2014. To avoid a technical expiry, the Eurogroup postponed the expiry date for its frozen programme to 30 June 2015, paving the way within this new deadline for the possibility of transfer terms first to be renegotiated and then finally complied with to ensure completion of the programme. As Greece withdrew unilaterally from the process of settling renegotiated terms and time extension for the completion of the programme, it expired uncompleted on 30 June 2015. Hereby, Greece lost the possibility to extract €13.7bn of remaining funds from the EFSF (€1.0bn unused PSI and Bond Interest facilities, €10.9bn unused bank recapitalization funds and a €1.8bn frozen tranche of macroeconomic support), and also lost the remaining SDR 13.561bn of IMF funds (being equal to €16.0bn as per the SDR exchange rate on 5 Jan 2012), although those lost IMF funds might be recouped if Greece settles an agreement for a new third bailout programme with ESM — and passes the first review of such programme.
4 A new third bailout programme worth €86bn in total, jointly covered by funds from IMF and ESM, will be disbursed in tranches from August 2015 until August 2018. The programme was approved to be negotiated on 17 July 2015, and approved in full detail by the publication of an ESM facility agreement on 19 August 2015. IMF's transfer of the "remainder of its frozen I+II programme" and their new commitment also to contribute with a part of the funds for the third bailout, depends on a successful prior completion of the first review of the new third programme in October 2015. Due to a matter of urgency, EFSM immediately conducted a temporary €7.16bn emergency transfer to Greece on 20 July 2015, which was fully overtaken by ESM when the first tranche of the third program was conducted 20 August 2015. Due to being temporary bridge financing and not part of an official bailout programme, the table do not display this special type of EFSM transfer.
The loans of the program has an average maturity of 32.5 years and carry a variable interest rate (currently at 1%). The program has earmarked transfer of up till €25bn for bank recapitalization purposes (to be used to the extent deemed needed by the annual stress tests of European Banking Supervision), and also include establishment of a new privatization fund to conduct sale of Greek public assets — of which the first generated €25bn will be used for early repayment of the bailout loans earmarked for bank recapitalizations. Potential debt relief for Greece, in the form of longer grace and payment periods, will be considered by the European public creditors after the first review of the new programme, by October/November 2015.
5 Hungary recovered faster than expected, and thus did not receive the remaining €4.4bn bailout support scheduled for October 2009-October 2010. IMF paid in total 7.6 out of 10.5 billion SDR, equal to €9.1bn out of €12.5bn at current exchange rates.
6 In Ireland the National Treasury Management Agency also paid €17.5bn for the program on behalf of the Irish government, of which €10bn were injected by the National Pensions Reserve Fund and the remaining €7.5bn paid by "domestic cash resources", which helped increase the program total to €85bn. As this extra amount by technical terms is an internal bail-in, it has not been added to the bailout total. As of 31 March 2014 all committed funds had been transferred, with EFSF even paying €0.7bn more, so that the total amount of funds had been marginally increased from €67.5bn to €68.2bn.
7 Latvia recovered faster than expected, and thus did not receive the remaining €3.0bn bailout support originally scheduled for 2011.
8 Portugal completed its support programme as scheduled in June 2014, one month later than initially planned due to awaiting a verdict by its constitutional court, but without asking for establishment of any subsequent precautionary credit line facility. By the end of the programme all committed amounts had been transferred, except for the last tranche of €2.6bn (1.7bn from EFSM and 0.9bn from IMF), which the Portuguese government declined to receive. The reason why the IMF transfers still mounted to slightly more than the initially committed €26bn, was due to its payment with SDR's instead of euro — and some favorable developments in the EUR-SDR exchange rate compared to the beginning of the programme. In November 2014, Portugal received its last delayed €0.4bn tranche from EFSM (post programme), hereby bringing its total drawn bailout amount up at €76.8bn out of €79.0bn.
9 Romania recovered faster than expected, and thus did not receive the remaining €1.0bn bailout support originally scheduled for 2011.
10 Romania had a precautionary credit line with €5.0bn available to draw money from if needed, during the period March 2011-June 2013; but entirely avoided to draw on it. During the period, the World Bank however supported with a transfer of €0.4bn as a DPL3 development loan programme and €0.75bn as results based financing for social assistance and health.
11 Romania had a second €4bn precautionary credit line established jointly by IMF and EU, of which IMF accounts for SDR 1.75134bn = €2bn, which is available to draw money from if needed during the period from October 2013 to 30 September 2015. In addition the World Bank also made €1bn available under a Development Policy Loan with a deferred drawdown option valid from January 2013 through December 2015. The World Bank will throughout the period also continue providing earlier committed development programme support of €0.891bn, but this extra transfer is not accounted for as "bailout support" in the third programme due to being "earlier committed amounts". In April 2014, the World Bank increased their support by adding the transfer of a first €0.75bn Fiscal Effectiveness and Growth Development Policy Loan, with the final second FEG-DPL tranch on €0.75bn (worth about $1bn) to be contracted in the first part of 2015. No money had been drawn from the precautionary credit line, as of May 2014.
12 Spain's €100bn support package has been earmarked only for recapitalisation of the financial sector. Initially an EFSF emergency account with €30bn was available, but nothing was drawn, and it was cancelled again in November 2012 after being superseded by the regular ESM recapitalisation programme. The first ESM recapitalisation tranch of €39.47bn was approved 28 November, and transferred to the bank recapitalisation fund of the Spanish government (FROB) on 11 December 2012. A second tranch for "category 2" banks on €1.86n was approved by the Commission on 20 December, and finally transferred by ESM on 5 February 2013. "Category 3" banks were also subject for a possible third tranch in June 2013, in case they failed before then to acquire sufficient additional capital funding from private markets. During January 2013, all "category 3" banks however managed to fully recapitalise through private markets and thus will not be in need for any State aid. The remaining €58.7bn of the initial support package is thus not expected to be activated, but will stay available as a fund with precautionary capital reserves to possibly draw upon if unexpected things happen — until 31 December 2013. In total €41.3bn out of the available €100bn was transferred. Upon the scheduled exit of the programme, no follow-up assistance was requested.

=== European Financial Stability Facility (EFSF) ===
On 9 May 2010, the 27 EU member states agreed to create the European Financial Stability Facility, a legal instrument aiming at preserving financial stability in Europe by providing financial assistance to eurozone states in difficulty. The EFSF can issue bonds or other debt instruments on the market with the support of the German Debt Management Office to raise the funds needed to provide loans to eurozone countries in financial troubles, recapitalize banks or buy sovereign debt.

Emissions of bonds are backed by guarantees given by the euro area member states in proportion to their share in the paid-up capital of the European Central Bank. The €440 billion lending capacity of the facility is jointly and severally guaranteed by the eurozone countries' governments and may be combined with loans up to €60 billion from the European Financial Stabilisation Mechanism (reliant on funds raised by the European Commission using the EU budget as collateral) and up to €250 billion from the International Monetary Fund (IMF) to obtain a financial safety net up to €750 billion.

The EFSF issued €5 billion of five-year bonds in its inaugural benchmark issue 25 January 2011, attracting an order book of €44.5 billion. This amount is a record for any sovereign bond in Europe, and €24.5 billion more than the European Financial Stabilisation Mechanism (EFSM), a separate European Union funding vehicle, with a €5 billion issue in the first week of January 2011.

On 29 November 2011, the member state finance ministers agreed to expand the EFSF by creating certificates that could guarantee up to 30% of new issues from troubled euro-area governments, and to create investment vehicles that would boost the EFSF’s firepower to intervene in primary and secondary bond markets.

==== Reception by financial markets ====
Stocks surged worldwide after the EU announced the EFSF's creation. The facility eased fears that the Greek debt crisis would spread, and this led to some stocks rising to the highest level in a year or more. The euro made its biggest gain in 18 months, before falling to a new four-year low a week later. Shortly after the euro rose again as hedge funds and other short-term traders unwound short positions and carry trades in the currency. Commodity prices also rose following the announcement.

The dollar Libor held at a nine-month high. Default swaps also fell. The VIX closed down a record almost 30%, after a record weekly rise the preceding week that prompted the bailout. The agreement is interpreted as allowing the ECB to start buying government debt from the secondary market which is expected to reduce bond yields. As a result, Greek bond yields fell sharply from over 10% to just over 5%. Asian bonds yields also fell with the EU bailout.

==== Usage of EFSF funds ====
The EFSF only raises funds after an aid request is made by a country. As of the end of July 2012, it has been activated various times. In November 2010, it financed €17.7 billion of the total €67.5 billion rescue package for Ireland (the rest was loaned from individual European countries, the European Commission and the IMF). In May 2011 it contributed one third of the €78 billion package for Portugal. As part of the second bailout for Greece, the loan was shifted to the EFSF, amounting to €164 billion (130bn new package plus 34.4bn remaining from Greek Loan Facility) throughout 2014. On 20 July 2012, European finance ministers sanctioned the first tranche of a partial bail-out worth up to €100 billion for Spanish banks. This leaves the EFSF with €148 billion or an equivalent of €444 billion in leveraged firepower.

The EFSF is set to expire in 2013, running some months parallel to the permanent €500 billion rescue funding program called the European Stability Mechanism (ESM), which will start operating as soon as member states representing 90% of the capital commitments have ratified it. (see section: ESM)

On 13 January 2012, Standard & Poor’s downgraded France and Austria from AAA rating, lowered Spain, Italy (and five other) euro members further, and maintained the top credit rating for Finland, Germany, Luxembourg, and the Netherlands; shortly after, S&P also downgraded the EFSF from AAA to AA+.

=== European Financial Stabilisation Mechanism (EFSM) ===
On 5 January 2011, the European Union created the European Financial Stabilisation Mechanism (EFSM), an emergency funding programme reliant upon funds raised on the financial markets and guaranteed by the European Commission using the budget of the European Union as collateral. It runs under the supervision of the Commission and aims at preserving financial stability in Europe by providing financial assistance to EU member states in economic difficulty. The Commission fund, backed by all 27 European Union members, has the authority to raise up to €60 billion and is rated AAA by Fitch, Moody's and Standard & Poor's.

Under the EFSM, the EU successfully placed in the capital markets a €5 billion issue of bonds as part of the financial support package agreed for Ireland, at a borrowing cost for the EFSM of 2.59%.

Like the EFSF, the EFSM was replaced by the permanent rescue funding programme ESM, which was launched in September 2012.

=== Brussels agreement and aftermath ===
On 26 October 2011, leaders of the 17 eurozone countries met in Brussels and agreed on a 50% write-off of Greek sovereign debt held by banks, a fourfold increase (to about €1 trillion) in bail-out funds held under the European Financial Stability Facility, an increased mandatory level of 9% for bank capitalisation within the EU and a set of commitments from Italy to take measures to reduce its national debt. Also pledged was €35 billion in "credit enhancement" to mitigate losses likely to be suffered by European banks. José Manuel Barroso characterised the package as a set of "exceptional measures for exceptional times".

The package's acceptance was put into doubt on 31 October when Greek Prime Minister George Papandreou announced that a referendum would be held so that the Greek people would have the final say on the bailout, upsetting financial markets. On 3 November 2011 the promised Greek referendum on the bailout package was withdrawn by Prime Minister Papandreou.

In late 2011, Landon Thomas in the New York Times noted that some, at least, European banks were maintaining high dividend payout rates and none were getting capital injections from their governments even while being required to improve capital ratios. Thomas quoted Richard Koo, an economist based in Japan, an expert on that country's banking crisis, and specialist in balance sheet recessions, as saying:

I do not think Europeans understand the implications of a systemic banking crisis.... When all banks are forced to raise capital at the same time, the result is going to be even weaker banks and an even longer recession – if not depression.... Government intervention should be the first resort, not the last resort.

Beyond equity issuance and debt-to-equity conversion, then, one analyst "said that as banks find it more difficult to raise funds, they will move faster to cut down on loans and unload lagging assets" as they work to improve capital ratios. This latter contraction of balance sheets "could lead to a depression", the analyst said. Reduced lending was a circumstance already at the time being seen in a "deepen[ing] crisis" in commodities trade finance in western Europe.

==== Final agreement on the second bailout package ====
In a marathon meeting on 20/21 February 2012 the Eurogroup agreed with the IMF and the Institute of International Finance on the final conditions of the second bailout package worth €130 billion. The lenders agreed to increase the nominal haircut from 50% to 53.5%. EU Member States agreed to an additional retroactive lowering of the interest rates of the Greek Loan Facility to a level of just 150 basis points above the Euribor. Furthermore, governments of Member States where central banks currently hold Greek government bonds in their investment portfolio commit to pass on to Greece an amount equal to any future income until 2020. Altogether this should bring down Greece's debt to between 117% and 120.5% of GDP by 2020.

== European Central Bank ==
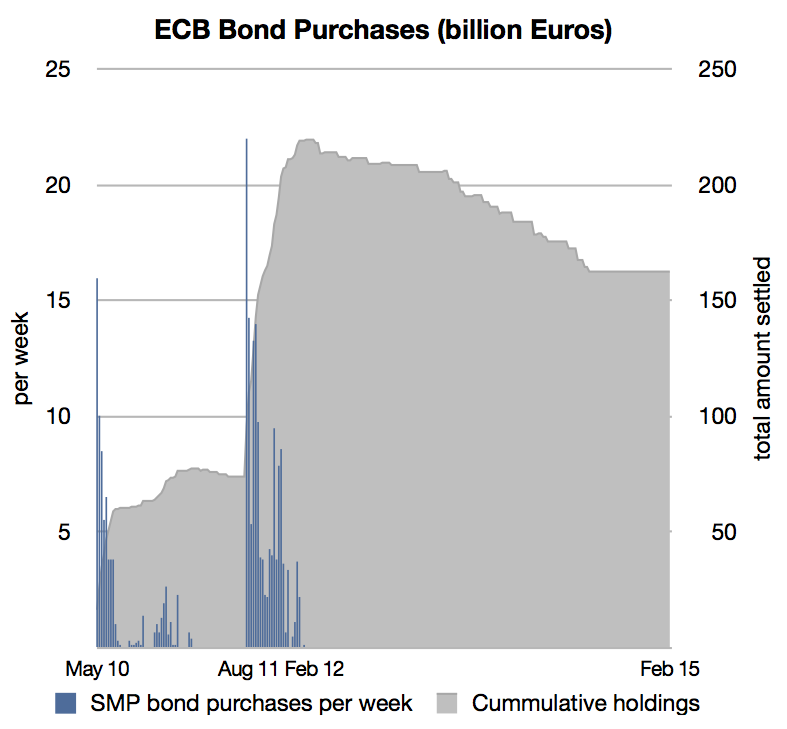
ECB Securities Markets Program (SMP) covering bond purchases since May 2010

The European Central Bank (ECB) has taken a series of measures aimed at reducing volatility in the financial markets and at improving liquidity.

In May 2010 it took the following actions:

- It began open market operations buying government and private debt securities, reaching €219.5 billion in February 2012, though it simultaneously absorbed the same amount of liquidity to prevent a rise in inflation. According to Rabobank economist Elwin de Groot, there is a "natural limit" of €300 billion the ECB can sterilize.
- It reactivated the dollar swap lines with Federal Reserve support.
- It changed its policy regarding the necessary credit rating for loan deposits, accepting as collateral all outstanding and new debt instruments issued or guaranteed by the Greek government, regardless of the nation's credit rating.

The move took some pressure off Greek government bonds, which had just been downgraded to junk status, making it difficult for the government to raise money on capital markets.

On 30 November 2011, the ECB, the U.S. Federal Reserve, the central banks of Canada, Japan, Britain and the Swiss National Bank provided global financial markets with additional liquidity to ward off the debt crisis and to support the real economy. The central banks agreed to lower the cost of dollar currency swaps by 50 basis points to come into effect on 5 December 2011. They also agreed to provide each other with abundant liquidity to make sure that commercial banks stay liquid in other currencies.

=== Long Term Refinancing Operation (LTRO) ===
Though the ECB's main refinancing operations (MRO) are from repo auctions with a (bi)weekly maturity and monthly maturation, the ECB now conducts Long Term Refinancing Operations (LTROs), maturing after three months, six months, 12 months and 36 months. In 2003, refinancing via LTROs amounted to 45 bln euro which is about 20% of overall liquidity provided by the ECB.

The ECB's first supplementary longer-term refinancing operation (LTRO) with a six-month maturity was announced March 2008. Previously the longest tender offered was three months. It announced two 3-month and one 6-month full allotment of Long Term Refinancing Operations (LTROs). The first tender was settled 3 April, and was more than four times oversubscribed. The €25 billion auction drew bids amounting to €103.1 billion, from 177 banks. Another six-month tender was allotted on 9 July, again to the amount of €25 billion. The first 12-month LTRO in June 2009 had close to 1100 bidders.

On 22 December 2011, the ECB started the biggest infusion of credit into the European banking system in the euro's 13-year history. Under its Long Term Refinancing Operations (LTROs) it loaned €489 billion to 523 banks for an exceptionally long period of three years at a rate of just one percent. Previous refinancing operations matured after three, six and twelve months. The by far biggest amount of €325 billion was tapped by banks in Greece, Ireland, Italy and Spain.

This way the ECB tried to make sure that banks have enough cash to pay off €200 billion of their own maturing debts in the first three months of 2012, and at the same time keep operating and loaning to businesses so that a credit crunch does not choke off economic growth. It also hoped that banks would use some of the money to buy government bonds, effectively easing the debt crisis. On 29 February 2012, the ECB held a second auction, LTRO2, providing 800 Eurozone banks with further €529.5 billion in cheap loans. Net new borrowing under the €529.5 billion February auction was around €313 billion; out of a total of €256 billion existing ECB lending (MRO + 3m&6m LTROs), €215 billion was rolled into LTRO2.

ECB lending has largely replaced inter-bank lending. Spain has €365 billion and Italy has €281 billion of borrowings from the ECB (June 2012 data). Germany has €275 billion on deposit.

=== Resignations ===
In September 2011, Jürgen Stark became the second German after Axel A. Weber to resign from the ECB Governing Council in 2011. Weber, the former Deutsche Bundesbank president, was once thought to be a likely successor to Jean-Claude Trichet as bank president. He and Stark were both thought to have resigned due to "unhappiness with the ECB’s bond purchases, which critics say erode the bank’s independence". Stark was "probably the most hawkish" member of the council when he resigned. Weber was replaced by his Bundesbank successor Jens Weidmann, while Belgium's Peter Praet took Stark's original position, heading the ECB's economics department.

=== Money supply growth ===
In April, 2012, statistics showed a growth trend in the M1 "core" money supply. Having fallen from an over 9% growth rate in mid-2008 to negative 1% +/- for several months in 2011, M1 core has built to a 2-3% range in early 2012. "'It is still early days but a further recovery in peripheral real M1 would suggest an end to recessions by late 2012,' said Simon Ward from Henderson Global Investors who collects the data." While attributing the money supply growth to ECB's LTRO policies, an analysis in The Telegraph said lending "continued to fall across the eurozone in March [and] ... [t]he jury is out on the ... three-year lending adventure (LTRO)".

=== Reorganization of the European banking system ===
On 16 June 2012, the European Central Bank together with other European leaders hammered out plans for the ECB to become a bank regulator and to form a deposit insurance program to augment national programs. Other economic reforms promoting European growth and employment were also proposed.

=== Outright Monetary Transactions (OMTs) ===
On 6 September 2012, the ECB announced to offer additional financial support in the form of some yield-lowering bond purchases (OMT), for all eurozone countries involved in a sovereign state bailout program from EFSF/ESM. A eurozone country can benefit from the program if – and for as long as – it is found to suffer from stressed bond yields at excessive levels; but only at the point of time where the country possesses/regains a complete market access – and only if the country still comply with all terms in the signed Memorandum of Understanding (MoU) agreement. Countries receiving a precautionary programme rather than a sovereign bailout, will per definition have complete market access and thus qualify for OMT support if also suffering from stressed interest rates on its government bonds. In regards of countries receiving a sovereign bailout (Ireland, Portugal and Greece), they will on the other hand not qualify for OMT support before they have regained complete market access, which will normally only happen after having received the last scheduled bailout disbursement. Despite none OMT programmes were ready to start in September/October, the financial markets straight away took notice of the additionally planned OMT packages from ECB, and started slowly to price-in a decline of both short-term and long-term interest rates in all European countries previously suffering from stressed and elevated interest levels (as OMTs were regarded as an extra potential back-stop to counter the frozen liquidity and highly stressed rates; and just the knowledge about their potential existence in the very near future helped to calm the markets).

If Spain signs a negotiated Memorandum of Understanding with the Troika (EC, ECB and IMF) outlining ESM shall offer a precautionary programme with credit lines for the Spanish government to potentially draw on if needed (beside of the bank recapitalisation package they already applied for), this would qualify Spain also to receive the OMT support from ECB, as the sovereign state would still continue to operate with a complete market access with the precautionary conditioned credit line. In regards of Ireland, Portugal and Greece, they on the other hand have not yet regained complete market access, and thus do not yet qualify for OMT support.

== European Stability Mechanism (ESM) ==
The European Stability Mechanism (ESM) is a permanent rescue funding programme to succeed the temporary European Financial Stability Facility and European Financial Stabilisation Mechanism in July 2012 but it had to be postponed until after the Federal Constitutional Court of Germany had confirmed the legality of the measures on 12 September 2012. The permanent bailout fund entered into force for 16 signatories on 27 September 2012. It became effective in Estonia on 4 October 2012 after the completion of their ratification process.

On 16 December 2010 the European Council agreed a two line amendment to the EU Lisbon Treaty to allow for a permanent bail-out mechanism to be established including stronger sanctions. In March 2011, the European Parliament approved the treaty amendment after receiving assurances that the European Commission, rather than EU states, would play 'a central role' in running the ESM. The ESM is an intergovernmental organisation under public international law. It is located in Luxembourg.

Such a mechanism serves as a "financial firewall." Instead of a default by one country rippling through the entire interconnected financial system, the firewall mechanism can ensure that downstream nations and banking systems are protected by guaranteeing some or all of their obligations. Then the single default can be managed while limiting financial contagion.

== European Fiscal Compact ==
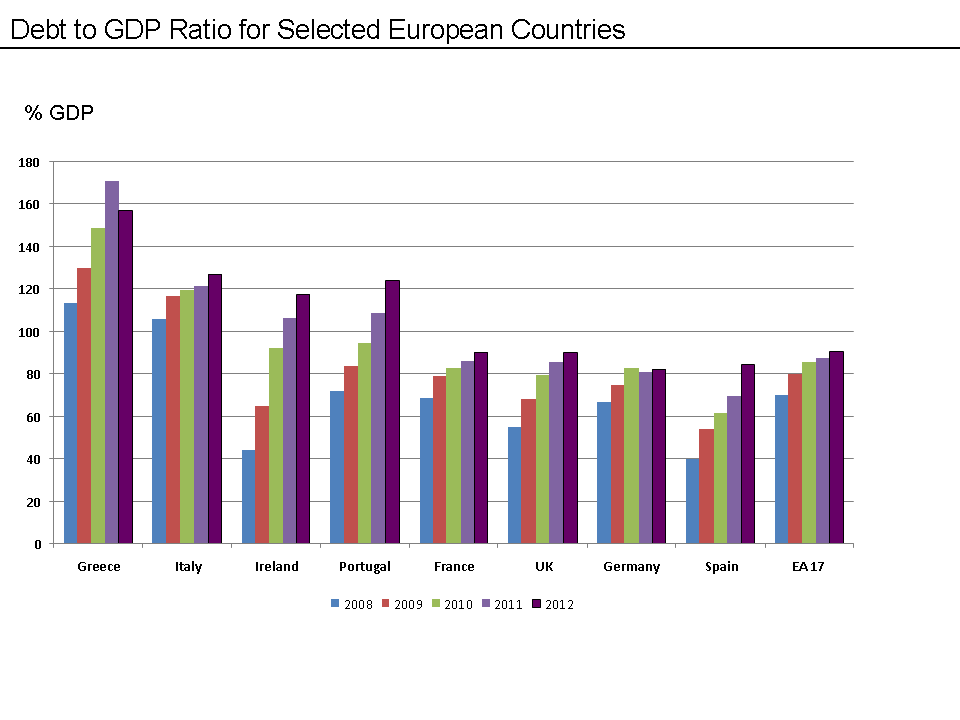
Public debt to GDP ratio for selected Eurozone countries and the UK - 2008 to 2011. Source Data: Eurostat.

In March 2011 a new reform of the Stability and Growth Pact was initiated, aiming at straightening the rules by adopting an automatic procedure for imposing of penalties in case of breaches of either the 3% deficit or the 60% debt rules. By the end of the year, Germany, France and some other smaller EU countries went a step further and vowed to create a fiscal union across the eurozone with strict and enforceable fiscal rules and automatic penalties embedded in the EU treaties. On 9 December 2011 at the European Council meeting, all 17 members of the eurozone and six countries that aspire to join agreed on a new intergovernmental treaty to put strict caps on government spending and borrowing, with penalties for those countries who violate the limits. All other non-eurozone countries apart from the UK are also prepared to join in, subject to parliamentary vote. The treaty will enter into force on 1 January 2013, if by that time 12 members of the euro area have ratified it.

Originally EU leaders planned to change existing EU treaties but this was blocked by British prime minister David Cameron, who demanded that the City of London be excluded from future financial regulations, including the proposed EU financial transaction tax. By the end of the day, 26 countries had agreed to the plan, leaving the United Kingdom as the only country not willing to join. Cameron subsequently conceded that his action had failed to secure any safeguards for the UK. Britain's refusal to be part of the fiscal compact to safeguard the eurozone constituted a de facto refusal (PM David Cameron vetoed the project) to engage in any radical revision of the Lisbon Treaty. John Rentoul of The Independent concluded that "Any Prime Minister would have done as Cameron did".

== See also ==
- 2000s commodities boom
- 2008 financial crisis
- 2008–2012 Icelandic financial crisis
- Crisis situations and protests in Europe since 2000
- European sovereign-debt crisis: List of acronyms
- European sovereign-debt crisis: List of protagonists
- Federal Reserve Economic Data FRED
- Great Recession
- List of countries by credit rating
- DiEM 2025 (Democracy in Europe Movement⋅2025)
