= Robillard (surname) =

Robillard is a surname of French origin. It is not uncommon in Canada and is known in certain areas of the United States, especially New England. Variations of the name include Rabior, Rebeor and Rubeor.

Notable people with the name include:

- Alexander Robillard (1843–1907), Canadian politician
- Anne Robillard (born 1955), Canadian novelist
- Camille Robillard (born 2004), French footballer
- Charlotte Robillard-Millette (born 1999), Canadian tennis player
- Clément Robillard (1850–1926), Canadian politician
- Duke Robillard (born 1948), blues guitarist and singer
- Gene Robillard (1929–2007), Canadian football player
- Harry Edward de Robillard Wetherall (1889–1979), British army general
- Honoré Robillard (1835–1914), Canadian politician, brother of Alexander
- Hyacinthe Robillard d'Avrigny (1675–1719), French Jesuit historian of religion
- Jean Robillard, Canadian medical doctor and academic
- Joseph Robillard (1839–1905), Quebec politician
- Lucienne Robillard (born 1945), Canadian politician
- Marc Robillard (born 1974), Canadian musician
- Melanie Robillard (born 1982), Canadian curler
- Stephan de Robillard (born 2002), Mauritian footballer
- Ulysse-Janvier Robillard (1826–1900), Quebec politician
- Yves Robillard (born 1942), Canadian politician

== See also ==
- Robillard (disambiguation)
