= Greek economy referendum =

Greek economy referendum may refer to:

- 2011 Greek proposed economy referendum
- 2015 Greek bailout referendum
