= 1997 Asian financial crisis =

Regional financial crisis that struck East and Southeast Asia in 1997–1998

1997 Asian financial crisis

Annual growth of GDP per capita in affected countries from 1995 to 2000

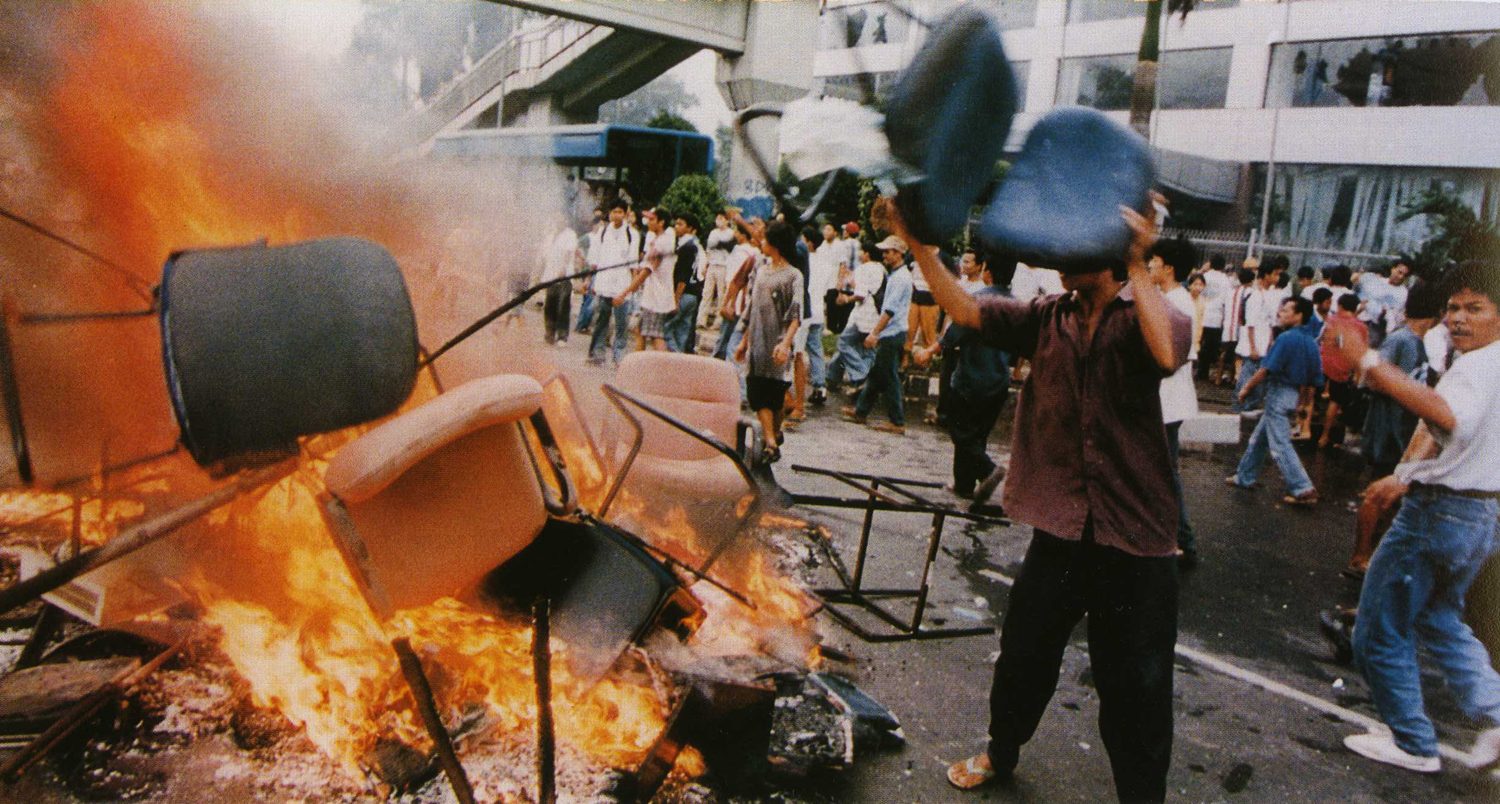
Rioters in Jakarta, during the May 1998 riots of Indonesia

A financial crisis gripped much of East and Southeast Asia during the late 1990s. It began in Thailand in July 1997 before spreading to several other countries with a ripple effect, raising fears of a worldwide economic meltdown due to financial contagion. However, the recovery in 1998–1999 was rapid, and worries of a meltdown quickly subsided.

Originating in Thailand on 2 July, where it was known as the Tom Yum Kung crisis (Thai: วิกฤตต้มยำกุ้ง), it followed the financial collapse of the Thai baht after the Thai government was forced to float the baht due to lack of foreign currency to support its currency peg to the U.S. dollar. Capital flight ensued almost immediately, beginning an international chain reaction. At the time, Thailand had acquired a burden of foreign debt. As the crisis spread, other Southeast Asian countries and later Japan and South Korea saw slumping currencies, devalued stock markets and other asset prices, and a precipitous rise in private debt. Foreign debt-to-GDP ratios rose from 100% to 167% in the four large Association of Southeast Asian Nations (ASEAN) economies in 1993–1996, then shot up beyond 180% during the worst of the crisis. In South Korea, the ratios rose from 13% to 21% and then as high as 40%, while the other northern newly industrialized countries fared much better. Only in Thailand and South Korea did debt service-to-exports ratios rise.

South Korea, Indonesia and Thailand were the countries most affected by the crisis. Hong Kong, Laos, Malaysia and the Philippines were also hurt by the slump. Brunei, mainland China, Japan, Singapore, Taiwan, and Vietnam were less affected, although all suffered from a general loss of confidence and subsidence of demand throughout the region. Although most of the governments of Asia had seemingly sound fiscal policies, the International Monetary Fund (IMF) stepped in to initiate a $40 billion program to stabilize the currencies of South Korea, Thailand, and Indonesia, economies particularly hard-hit by the crisis.

However, the efforts to stem a global economic crisis did little to stabilize the domestic situation in Indonesia. After 31 years in power, Indonesian dictator Suharto was forced to step down on 21 May 1998 in the wake of widespread rioting that followed sharp price increases caused by a drastic devaluation of the rupiah. The effects of the crisis lingered through 1998, where many important stocks fell in Wall Street as a result of a dip in the values of the currencies of Russia and Latin American countries, which weakened those countries' demand for U.S. exports. In 1998, growth in the Philippines dropped to virtually zero. Only Singapore proved relatively insulated from the shock, but nevertheless suffered serious hits in passing, mainly due to its status as a major financial hub and its geographical proximity to Malaysia and Indonesia. By 1999, however, analysts saw signs that the economies of Asia were beginning to recover. After the crisis, economies in East and Southeast Asia worked together toward financial stability and better financial supervision.

== Credit bubbles and fixed currency exchange rates ==
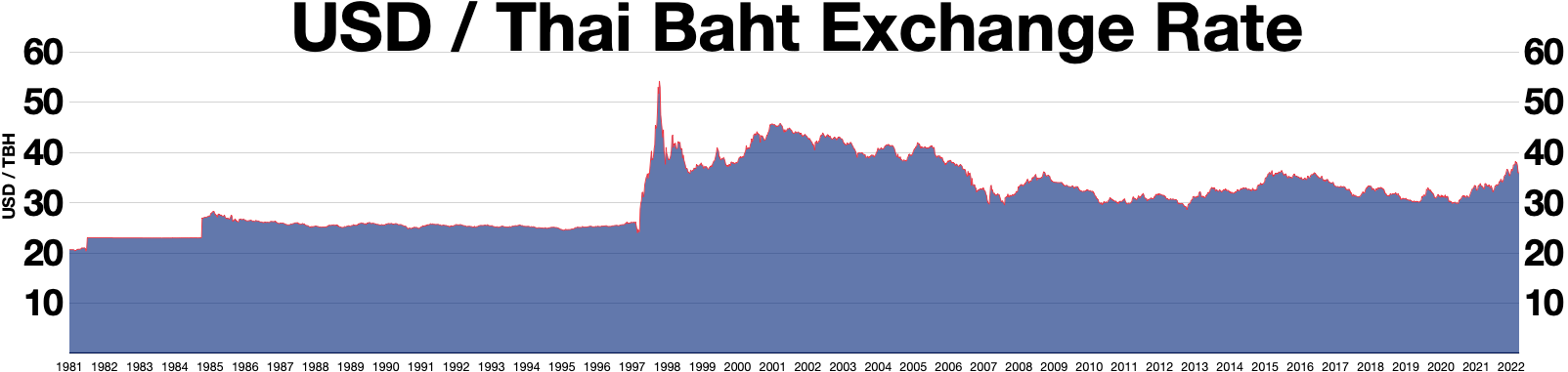
USD / Thai Baht exchange rate

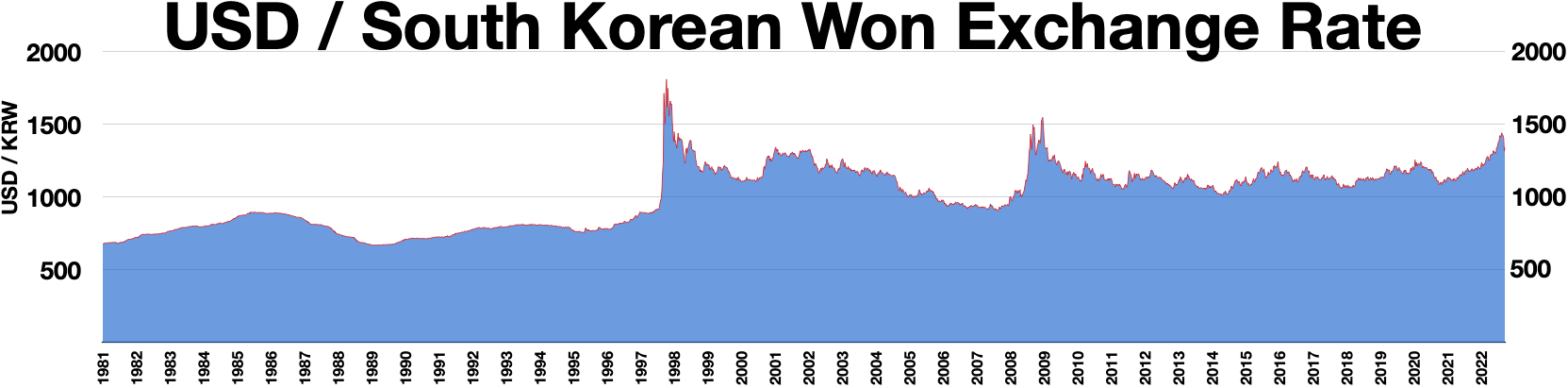
USD / South Korean Won exchange rate

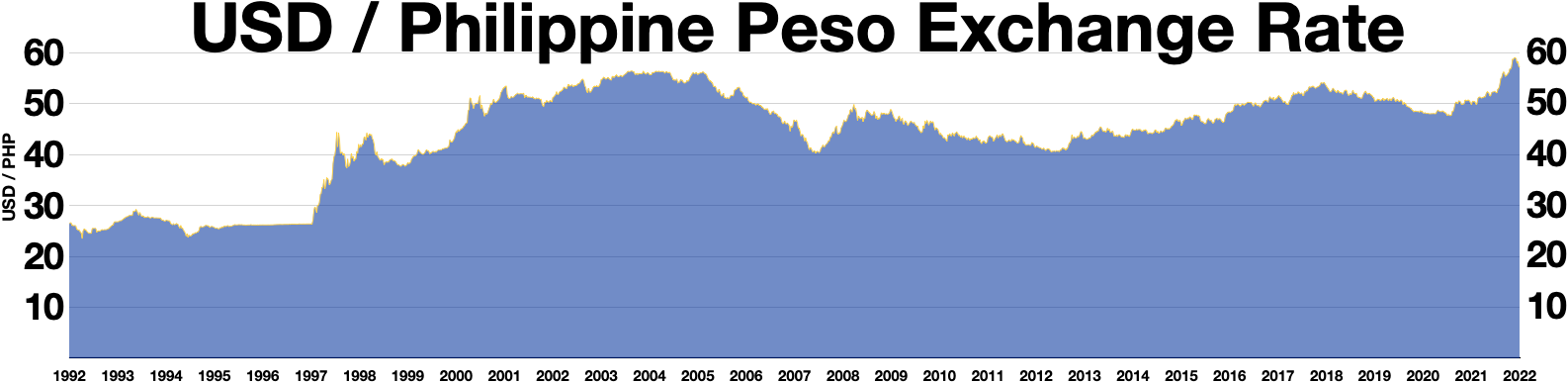
USD / Philippine Peso exchange rate

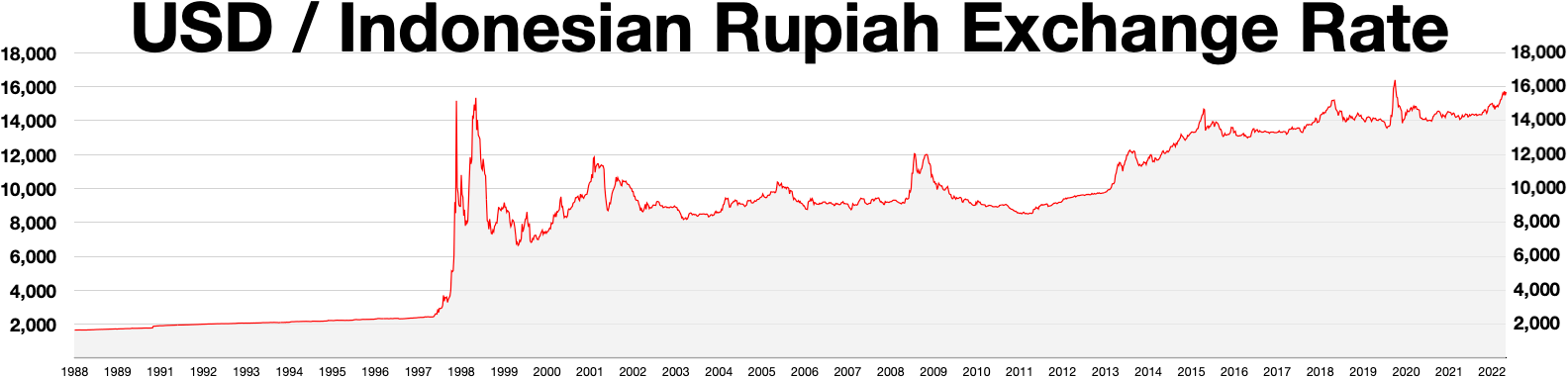
USD / Indonesian Rupiah exchange rate

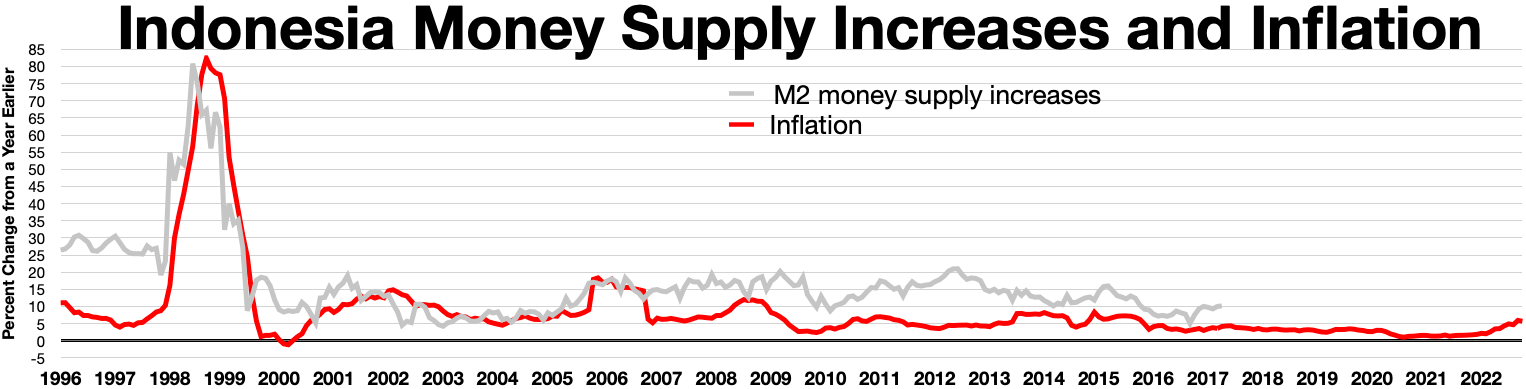
Indonesian M2 money supply increases Inflation

The causes of the debacle are many and disputed. Thailand's economy developed into an economic bubble fueled by hot money. More and more was required as the size of the bubble grew. The same type of situation happened in Malaysia and Indonesia, which had the added complication of what was called "crony capitalism". The short-term capital flow was expensive and often highly conditioned for quick profit. Development money went in a largely uncontrolled manner to certain people only – not necessarily the best suited or most efficient, but those closest to the centers of power. Weak corporate governance also led to inefficient investment and declining profitability.

Until 1999, Asia attracted almost half of the total capital inflow into developing countries. The economies of Southeast Asia in particular maintained high interest rates attractive to foreign investors looking for a high rate of return. As a result, the region's economies received a large inflow of money and experienced a dramatic run-up in asset prices. At the same time, the regional economies of Thailand, Malaysia, Indonesia, Singapore and South Korea experienced high growth rates, of 8–12% GDP, in the late 1980s and early 1990s. This achievement was widely acclaimed by financial institutions including the IMF and World Bank, and was known as part of the "Asian economic miracle".

In the mid-1990s, Thailand, Indonesia and South Korea had large private current account deficits, and the maintenance of fixed exchange rates encouraged external borrowing and led to excessive exposure to foreign exchange risk in both the financial and corporate sectors.

In the mid-1990s, a series of external shocks began to change the economic environment. The devaluation of the Chinese renminbi and the Japanese yen, subsequent to the latter's strengthening due to the Plaza Accord of 1985, the raising of U.S. interest rates which led to a strong U.S. dollar, and the sharp decline in semiconductor prices, all adversely affected their growth. As the U.S. economy recovered from a recession in the early 1990s, the U.S. Federal Reserve Bank under Alan Greenspan began to raise U.S. interest rates to head off inflation.

This made United States bonds a more attractive investment destination relative to Southeast Asia, which had been attracting hot money flows through high short-term interest rates, and raised the value of the U.S. dollar. For the Southeast Asian nations which had currencies pegged to the U.S. dollar, the higher U.S. dollar caused their own exports to become more expensive and less competitive in the global markets. Southeast Asia's export growth slowed dramatically in the spring of 1996, deteriorating their current account position.

Some economists have advanced the growing exports of China as a factor contributing to ASEAN nations' export growth slowdown, though these economists maintain the main cause of their crises was excessive real estate speculation. China had begun to compete effectively with other Asian exporters particularly in the 1990s after the implementation of a number of export-oriented reforms. Other economists dispute China's impact, noting that both ASEAN and China experienced simultaneous rapid export growth in the early 1990s.

Many economists believe that the Asian crisis was created not by market psychology or technology, but by policies that distorted incentives within the lender–borrower relationship. The resulting large quantities of credit that became available generated a highly leveraged economic climate, and pushed up asset prices to an unsustainable level, particularly those in non-productive sectors of the economy such as real-estate. These asset prices eventually began to collapse, causing individuals and companies to default on debt obligations.

== Panic among lenders and withdrawal of credit ==
The resulting panic among lenders led to a large withdrawal of credit from the crisis countries, causing a credit crunch and further bankruptcies. In addition, as foreign investors attempted to withdraw their money, the exchange market was flooded with the currencies of the crisis countries, putting depreciative pressure on their exchange rates. To prevent currency values collapsing, these countries' governments raised domestic interest rates to exceedingly high levels (to help diminish flight of capital by making lending more attractive to investors) and intervened in the exchange market, buying up any excess domestic currency at the fixed exchange rate with foreign reserves. Neither of these policy responses could be sustained for long, as several countries had insufficient levels of foreign exchange reserves.

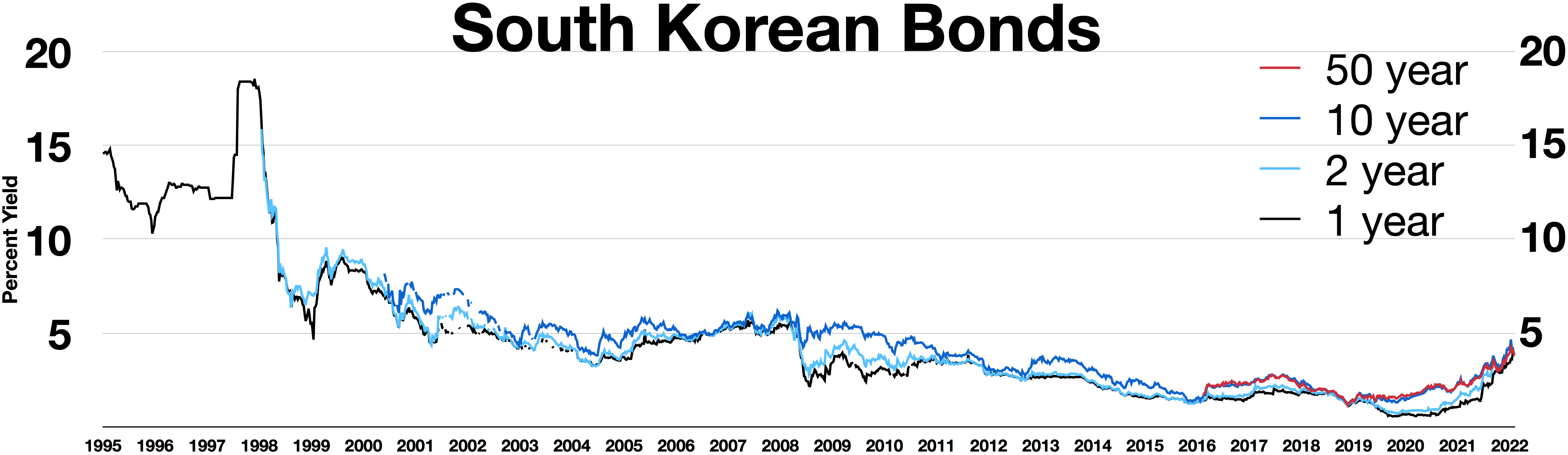
South Korean bonds 50 year 10 year 2 year 1 year

Very high interest rates, which can be extremely damaging to a healthy economy, wreaked further havoc on economies in an already fragile state. Simultaneously, the central banks were hemorrhaging foreign reserves, of which they had finite amounts. When it became clear that the tide of capital fleeing these countries was not to be stopped, the authorities ceased defending their fixed exchange rates and allowed their currencies to float. The resulting depreciated value of those currencies meant that foreign currency-denominated liabilities grew substantially in domestic currency terms, causing more bankruptcies and further deepening the crisis.

Other economists, including Joseph Stiglitz and Jeffrey Sachs, have downplayed the role of the real economy in the crisis compared to the financial markets. The rapidity with which the crisis happened has prompted Sachs and others to compare it to a classic bank run prompted by a sudden risk shock. Sachs pointed to strict monetary and contractionary fiscal policies implemented by the governments on the advice of the IMF in the wake of the crisis, while Frederic Mishkin points to the role of asymmetric information in the financial markets that led to a "herd mentality" among investors that magnified a small risk in the real economy. The crisis has thus attracted attention from behavioral economists interested in market psychology.

Another possible cause of the sudden risk shock may also be attributable to the handover of Hong Kong sovereignty on 1 July 1997. During the 1990s, hot money flew into the Southeast Asia region through financial hubs, especially Hong Kong. The investors were often ignorant of the actual fundamentals or risk profiles of the respective economies, and once the crisis gripped the region, the political uncertainty regarding the future of Hong Kong as an Asian financial centre led some investors to withdraw from Asia altogether. This shrink in investments only worsened the financial conditions in Asia (subsequently leading to the depreciation of the Thai baht on 2 July 1997).

Several case studies on the topic of the application of network analysis of a financial system help to explain the interconnectivity of financial markets, as well as the significance of the robustness of hubs (or main nodes). Any negative externalities in the hubs creates a ripple effect through the financial system and the economy (as well as any connected economies) as a whole.

The foreign ministers of the 10 ASEAN countries believed that the well co-ordinated manipulation of their currencies was a deliberate attempt to destabilize the ASEAN economies. Malaysian Prime Minister Mahathir Mohamad accused George Soros and other currency traders of ruining Malaysia's economy with currency speculation. Soros claims to have been a buyer of the ringgit during its fall, having sold it short in 1997.

At the 30th ASEAN Ministerial Meeting held in Subang Jaya, Malaysia, the foreign ministers issued a joint declaration on 25 July 1997 expressing serious concern and called for further intensification of ASEAN's cooperation to safeguard and promote ASEAN's interest in this regard. Coincidentally, on that same day, the central bankers of most of the affected countries were at the EMEAP (Executive Meeting of East Asia Pacific) meeting in Shanghai, and they failed to make the "New Arrangement to Borrow" operational. A year earlier, the finance ministers of these same countries had attended the 3rd APEC finance ministers meeting in Kyoto, Japan, on 17 March 1996, and according to that joint declaration, they had been unable to double the amounts available under the "General Agreement to Borrow" and the "Emergency Finance Mechanism".

== IMF role ==
The scope and the severity of the collapses led to an urgent need for outside intervention. Since the countries melting down were among the richest in their region, and in the world, and since hundreds of billions of dollars were at stake, any response to the crisis was likely to be cooperative and international. The International Monetary Fund created a series of bailouts ("rescue packages") for the most-affected economies to enable them to avoid default, tying the packages to currency, banking and financial system reforms. Due to IMF's involvement in the financial crisis, the term IMF Crisis became a way to refer to the Asian Financial Crisis in countries that were affected.

=== Economic reforms ===
The IMF's support was conditional on a series of economic reforms, the "structural adjustment package" (SAP). The SAPs called on crisis-struck nations to reduce government spending and deficits, allow insolvent banks and financial institutions to fail, and aggressively raise interest rates. The reasoning was that these steps would restore confidence in the nations' fiscal solvency, penalize insolvent companies, and protect currency values. Above all, it was stipulated that IMF-funded capital had to be administered rationally in the future, with no favored parties receiving funds by preference. In at least one of the affected countries the restrictions on foreign ownership were greatly reduced.

There were to be adequate government controls set up to supervise all financial activities, ones that were to be independent, in theory, of private interest. Insolvent institutions had to be closed, and insolvency itself had to be clearly defined. In addition, financial systems were to become "transparent", that is, provide the kind of financial information used in the West to make financial decisions.

As countries fell into crisis, many local businesses and governments that had taken out loans in US dollars, which suddenly became much more expensive relative to the local currency which formed their earned income, found themselves unable to pay their creditors. The dynamics of the situation were similar to that of the Latin American debt crisis. The effects of the SAPs were mixed and their impact controversial. Critics, however, noted the contractionary nature of these policies, arguing that in a recession, the traditional Keynesian response was to increase government spending, prop up major companies, and lower interest rates.

The reasoning was that by stimulating the economy and staving off recession, governments could restore confidence while preventing economic loss. They pointed out that the U.S. government had pursued expansionary policies, such as lowering interest rates, increasing government spending, and cutting taxes, when the United States itself entered a recession in 2001, and arguably the same in the fiscal and monetary policies during the 2008 financial crisis.

Many commentators in retrospect criticized the IMF for encouraging the developing economies of Asia down the path of "fast-track capitalism", meaning liberalization of the financial sector (elimination of restrictions on capital flows), maintenance of high domestic interest rates to attract portfolio investment and bank capital, and pegging of the national currency to the dollar to reassure foreign investors against currency risk.

=== IMF and high interest rates ===
The conventional high-interest-rate economic strategy is normally employed by monetary authorities to attain the chain objectives of tightened money supply, discouraged currency speculation, stabilized exchange rate, curbed currency depreciation, and ultimately contained inflation.

In the Asian meltdown, highest IMF officials rationalized their prescribed high interest rates as follows:

From then IMF First Deputy managing director, Stanley Fischer in 1998:

When their governments "approached the IMF, the reserves of Thailand and South Korea were perilously low, and the Indonesian Rupiah was excessively depreciated. Thus, the first order of business was... to restore confidence in the currency. To achieve this, countries have to make it more attractive to hold domestic currency, which in turn, requires increasing interest rates temporarily, even if higher interest costs complicate the situation of weak banks and corporations... Why not operate with lower interest rates and a greater devaluation? This is a relevant tradeoff, but there can be no question that the degree of devaluation in the Asian countries is excessive, both from the viewpoint of the individual countries, and from the viewpoint of the international system. Looking first to the individual country, companies with substantial foreign currency debts, as so many companies in these countries have, stood to suffer far more from... currency (depreciation) than from a temporary rise in domestic interest rates.... Thus, on macroeconomics... monetary policy has to be kept tight to restore confidence in the currency....

From the then IMF managing director Michel Camdessus:

To reverse (currency depreciation), countries have to make it more attractive to hold domestic currency, and that means temporarily raising interest rates, even if this (hurts) weak banks and corporations.

== Countries/Regions affected ==
The countries most affected by the 1997 Asian financial crisis, particularly Indonesia, South Korea and Thailand

=== Thailand ===
From 1985 to 1996, Thailand's economy grew at an average of over 9% per year, the highest economic growth rate of any country at the time. Inflation was kept reasonably low within a range of 3.4–5.7%. The baht was pegged at 25 to the U.S. dollar.

On 14 and 15 May 1997, the Thai baht was hit by massive speculative attacks. On 30 June 1997, Prime Minister Chavalit Yongchaiyudh said that he would not devalue the baht. However, Thailand lacked the foreign reserves to support the USD–Baht currency peg, and the Thai government was eventually forced to float the Baht, on 2 July 1997, allowing the value of the Baht to be set by the currency market. This caused a chain reaction of events, eventually culminating into a region-wide crisis.

Thailand's booming economy came to a halt amid massive layoffs in finance, real estate, and construction that resulted in huge numbers of workers returning to their villages in the countryside and 600,000 foreign workers being sent back to their home countries. The baht devalued swiftly and lost more than half of its value. The baht reached its lowest point of 56 units to the U.S. dollar in January 1998. The Thai stock market dropped 75%. Finance One, the largest Thai finance company until then, collapsed.

On 11 August 1997, the IMF unveiled a rescue package for Thailand with more than $17 billion, subject to conditions such as passing laws relating to bankruptcy (reorganizing and restructuring) procedures and establishing strong regulation frameworks for banks and other financial institutions. The IMF approved on 20 August 1997, another bailout package of $2.9 billion.

Poverty and inequality increased while employment, wages and social welfare all declined as a result of the crisis.

Following the 1997 Asian financial crisis, income in the northeast, the poorest part of the country, rose by 46 percent from 1998 to 2006. Nationwide poverty fell from 21.3 to 11.3 percent. Thailand's Gini coefficient, a measure of income inequality, fell from .525 in 2000 to .499 in 2004 (it had risen from 1996 to 2000) versus 1997 Asian financial crisis.

By 2001, Thailand's economy had recovered. The increasing tax revenues allowed the country to balance its budget and repay its debts to the IMF in 2003, four years ahead of schedule. The Thai baht continued to appreciate to 29 Baht to the U.S. dollar in October 2010.

=== Indonesia ===
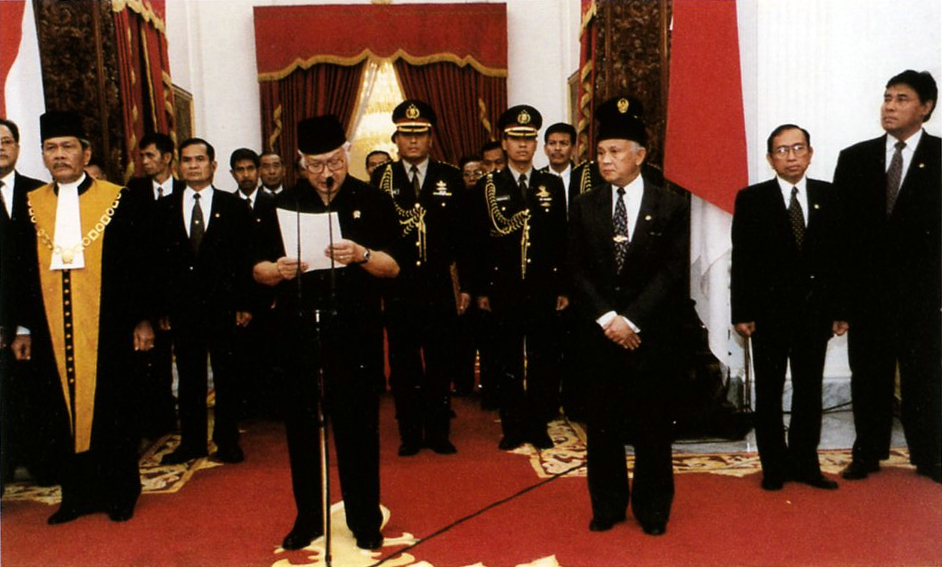
Fall of Suharto: President Suharto resigns, 21 May 1998.

In June 1997, Indonesia seemed far from crisis. Unlike Thailand, Indonesia had low inflation, a trade surplus of more than $900 million, huge foreign exchange reserves of more than $20 billion, and a good banking sector. However, a large number of Indonesian corporations had been borrowing in U.S. dollars. This practice had worked well for these corporations during the preceding years, as the rupiah had strengthened respective to the dollar; their effective levels of debt and financing costs had decreased as the local currency's value rose.

In July 1997, when Thailand floated the baht, Indonesia's monetary authorities widened the rupiah currency trading band from 8% to 12%. As a result, the rupiah suddenly came under severe attack in August. Therefore, on the 14th of the month, the managed floating exchange regime was replaced by a free-floating exchange rate arrangement. The rupiah dropped further due to the shift. The IMF came forward with a rescue package of $23 billion, but the rupiah was sinking further amid fears over corporate debts, massive selling of rupiah, and strong demand for dollars. The rupiah and the Jakarta Stock Exchange touched a historic low in September. Moody's eventually downgraded Indonesia's long-term debt to "junk bond".

Although the rupiah crisis began in July and August 1997, it intensified in November when the effects of that summer devaluation showed up on corporate balance sheets. Companies that had borrowed in dollars had to face the higher costs imposed upon them by the rupiah's decline, and many reacted by buying dollars through selling rupiah, undermining the value of the latter further. Before the crisis, the exchange rate between the rupiah and the dollar was roughly 2,600 rupiah to 1 U.S. dollar. The rate plunged to over 11,000 rupiah to 1 U.S. dollar on 9 January 1998, with spot rates over 14,000 during 23–26 January and trading again over 14,000 for about six weeks during June–July 1998. On 31 December 1998, the rate was almost exactly 8,000 to 1 U.S. dollar. Indonesia lost 13.5% of its GDP that year.

In February 1998, President Suharto sacked the incumbent Bank Indonesia governor, J. Soedradjad Djiwandono, but this proved insufficient. Amidst widespread rioting in May 1998, Suharto resigned under public pressure and Vice President B. J. Habibie replaced him.

=== South Korea ===
The banking sector was burdened with non-performing loans as its large corporations were funding aggressive expansions. During that time, there was a haste to build great conglomerates to compete on the world stage. Many businesses ultimately failed to ensure returns and profitability. The chaebol, South Korean conglomerates, simply absorbed more and more capital investment. Eventually, excess debt led to major failures and takeovers.

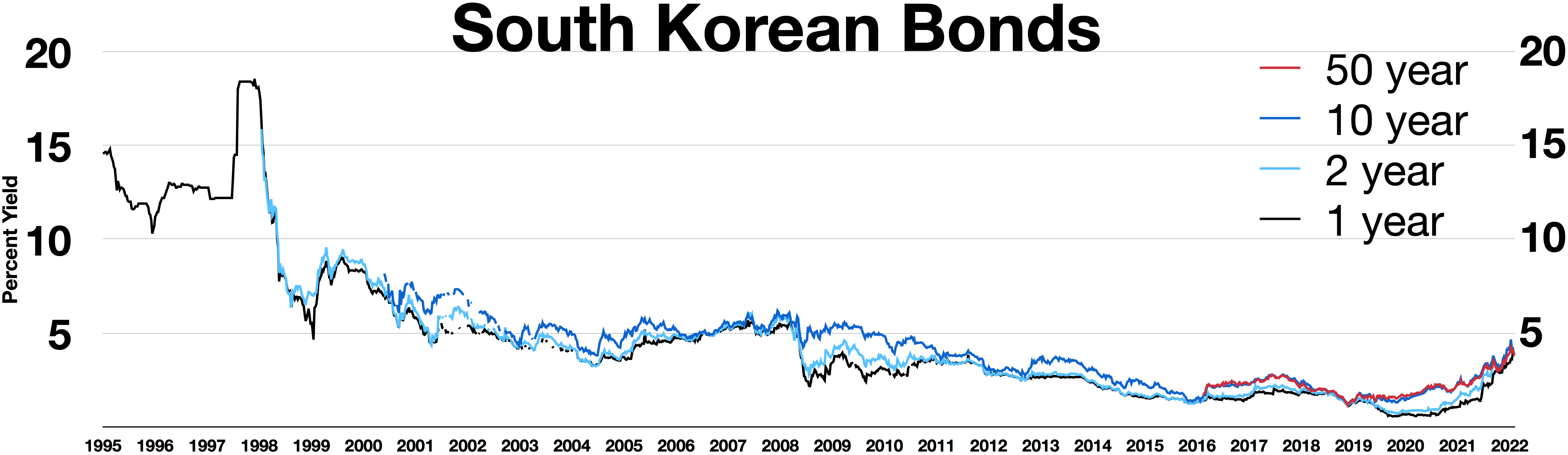
South Korean bonds 50 year 10 year 2 year 1 year

Amongst other stimuli, the crisis resulted in the bankruptcy of major Korean companies, provoking not only corporations, but also government officials towards corruption. The Hanbo scandal of early 1997 exposed South Korea's economic weaknesses and corruption problems to the international financial community. Later that year, in July, South Korea's third-largest car maker, Kia Motors, asked for emergency loans. The domino effect of collapsing large South Korean companies drove the interest rates up and international investors away.

In the wake of the Asian market downturn, Moody's lowered the credit rating of South Korea from A1 to A3, on 28 November 1997, and downgraded again to B2 on 11 December. That contributed to a further decline in South Korean shares since stock markets were already bearish in November. The Seoul stock exchange fell by 4% on 7 November 1997. On 8 November, it plunged by 7%, its biggest one-day drop to that date. And on 24 November, stocks fell a further 7.2% on fears that the IMF would demand tough reforms. In 1998, Hyundai Motor Company took over Kia Motors. Samsung Motors' $5 billion venture was dissolved due to the crisis, and eventually Daewoo Motors was sold to the American company General Motors (GM).

The International Monetary Fund (IMF) provided US$58.4 billion as a bailout package. In return, Korea was required to take restructuring measures. The ceiling on foreign investment in Korean companies was raised from 26 percent to 100 percent. In addition, the Korean government started financial sector reform program. Under the program, 787 insolvent financial institutions were closed or merged by June 2003. The number of financial institutions in which foreign investors invested has increased rapidly. Examples include New Bridge Capital's takeover of Korea First Bank.

The South Korean won, meanwhile, weakened to more than 1,700 per U.S. dollar from around 800, but later managed to recover. However, like the chaebol, South Korea's government did not escape unscathed. Its national debt-to-GDP ratio more than doubled (approximately 13% to 30%) as a result of the crisis.

=== Philippines ===
In May 1997, the Bangko Sentral ng Pilipinas, the country's central bank, raised interest rates by 1.75 percentage points and again by 2 points on 19 June. Thailand triggered the crisis on 2 July and on 3 July, the Bangko Sentral intervened to defend the peso, raising the overnight rate from 15% to 32% at the onset of the Asian crisis in mid-July 1997. The peso dropped from 26 pesos per dollar at the start of the crisis to 46.50 pesos in early 1998 to 53 pesos as in July 2001.

The Philippine GDP contracted by 0.6% during the worst part of the crisis, but grew by 3% by 2001, despite scandals of the administration of Joseph Estrada in 2001, most notably the "jueteng" scandal, causing the PSE Composite Index, the main index of the Philippine Stock Exchange, to fall to 1,000 points from a high of 3,448 points in 1997. The peso's value declined to around 55.75 pesos to the U.S. dollar. Later that year, Estrada was on the verge of impeachment but his allies in the senate voted against continuing the proceedings.

This led to popular protests culminating in the "EDSA II Revolution", which effected his resignation and elevated Gloria Macapagal Arroyo to the presidency. During her presidency, the crisis in the country lessened. The Philippine peso rose to about 50 pesos by the year's end and traded at around 41 pesos to a dollar in late 2007. The stock market also reached an all-time high in 2007 (surpassed by February 2018) and the economy was growing by more than 7 percent, its highest in nearly two decades.

=== China ===
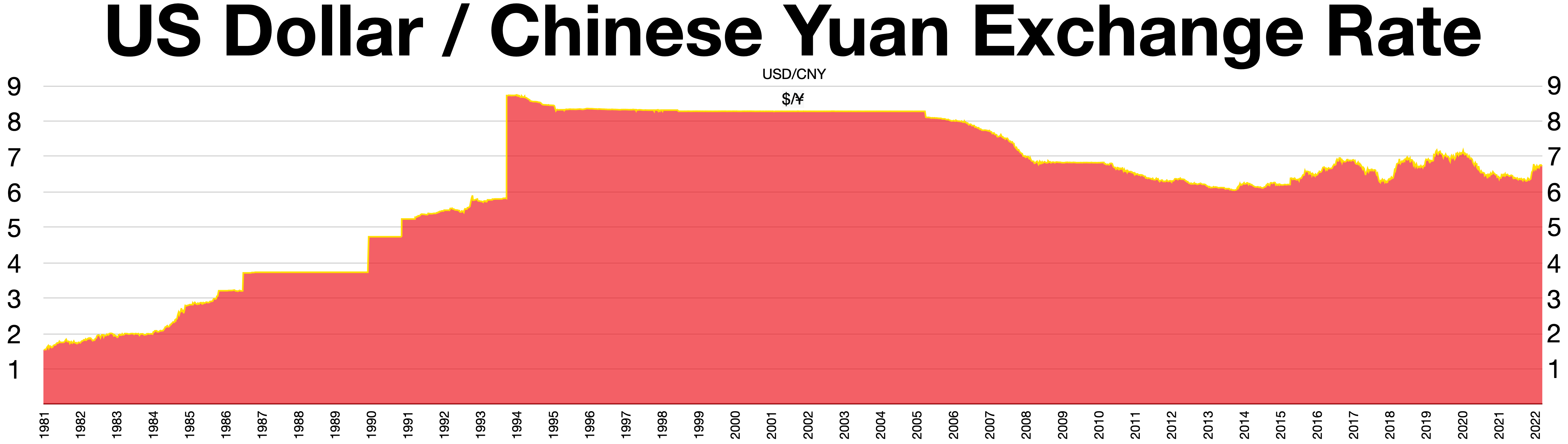
USD/CNY exchange rate 1981–2022

China's nonconvertible capital account and its foreign exchange control were decisive in limiting the impact of the crisis.

The Chinese currency, the renminbi (RMB), had been pegged in 1994 to the U.S. dollar at a ratio of 8.3 RMB to the dollar. Having largely kept itself above the fray throughout 1997–1998, there was heavy speculation in the Western press that China would soon be forced to devalue its currency to protect the competitiveness of its exports vis-a-vis those of the ASEAN nations, whose exports became cheaper relative to China's. However, the RMB's non-convertibility protected its value from currency speculators, and the decision was made to maintain the peg of the currency, thereby improving the country's standing within Asia.

Unlike investments of many of the Southeast Asian nations, almost all of China's foreign investment took the form of factories on the ground rather than securities, which insulated the country from rapid capital flight. While China was unaffected by the crisis compared to Southeast Asia and South Korea, GDP growth slowed sharply in 1998 and 1999, calling attention to structural problems within its economy. In particular, the Asian financial crisis convinced the Chinese government of the need to resolve the issues of its enormous financial weaknesses, such as having too many non-performing loans within its banking system, heavy reliance on trade with the United States, and inefficiencies in state-owned enterprises (SOEs), contributing to the acceleration of SOE restructuring and large-scale layoffs during the period known as Xiagang (下岗: step down from the post).

Other Asian countries harshly affected by the crisis sought the United States or Japan to bail them out of the difficult economic conditions. As the United States and Japan moved slowly, China made a highly regarded symbolic gesture by refusing to devalue its own currency (which presumably would have touched off a series of competitive devaluations with serious consequences for the region). Instead, China contributed $4 billion to neighboring countries via a combination of bilateral bailouts and contributing to IMF bailout packages.

In 1999, as a result of these actions, the World Bank described China as a "source of stability for the region" in one of its reports.

The Asian Financial Crisis helped solidify Chinese policymakers' views that China should not move towards a liberal market economy, and that its reform and opening up should focus on tightening financial regulations and resisting foreign pressures to open the country's financial markets prematurely. Policymakers became more resistant to market-oriented reforms and concluded that the Asian Financial Crisis highlighted the dangers of market forces operating without sufficient state supervision. Lessons learned by policymakers following the financial crisis also became an important factor in China's evolving approach to managing state-owned assets, particularly its foreign exchange reserves, and its creation of sovereign funds beginning with Central Huijin.

=== Hong Kong ===
In October 1997, the Hong Kong dollar, which had been pegged at 7.8 to the U.S. dollar since 1983, came under speculative pressure because Hong Kong's inflation rate had been significantly higher than the United States' for years. Monetary authorities spent more than $1 billion to defend the local currency. Since Hong Kong had more than $80 billion in foreign reserves, which is equivalent to 700% of its M1 money supply and 45% of its M3 money supply, the Hong Kong Monetary Authority (HKMA, effectively the region's central bank) managed to maintain the peg.

Stock markets became more and more volatile; between 20 and 23 October the Hang Seng Index dropped 23%. The HKMA then promised to protect the currency. On 23 October 1997, it raised overnight interest rates from 8% to 23%, and at one point to 280%. The HKMA had recognized that speculators were taking advantage of the city's unique currency-board system, in which overnight rates (HIBOR) automatically increase in proportion to large net sales of the local currency. The rate hike, however, increased downward pressure on the stock market, allowing speculators to profit by short selling shares. The HKMA started buying component shares of the Hang Seng Index in mid-August 1998.

The HKMA and Donald Tsang, the then Financial Secretary, declared war on speculators. The Government ended up buying approximately HK$120 billion (US$15 billion) worth of shares in various companies, and became the largest shareholder of some of those companies (e.g., the government owned 10% of HSBC) at the end of August, when hostilities ended with the closing of the August Hang Seng Index futures contract. In 1999, the Government started selling those shares by launching the Tracker Fund of Hong Kong, making a profit of about HK$30 billion (US$4 billion).

=== Malaysia ===
In July 1997, within days of the Thai baht devaluation, the Malaysian ringgit was heavily traded by speculators. The overnight rate jumped from under 8% to over 40%. This led to rating downgrades and a general sell off on the stock and currency markets. By end of 1997, ratings had fallen many notches from investment grade to junk, the KLSE had lost more than 50% from above 1,200 to under 600, and the ringgit had lost 50% of its value, falling from above 2.50 to under 4.57 on (23 January 1998) to the dollar. The then prime minister, Mahathir Mohamad imposed strict capital controls and introduced a 3.80 peg against the U.S. dollar.

Malaysian moves involved fixing the local currency to the U.S. dollar, stopping the overseas trade in ringgit currency and other ringgit assets therefore making offshore use of the ringgit invalid, restricting the amount of currency and investments that residents can take abroad, and imposed for foreign portfolio funds, a minimum one-year "stay period" which since has been converted to an exit tax. The decision to make ringgit held abroad invalid has also dried up sources of ringgit held abroad that speculators borrow from to manipulate the ringgit, for example by "selling short". Those who did, had to repurchase the limited ringgit at higher prices, making it unattractive to them. It also fully suspended the trading of CLOB (Central Limit Order Book) counters, indefinitely freezing approximately $4.47 billion worth of shares and affecting 172,000 investors, most of them Singaporeans, which became a political issue between the two countries.

In 1998, the output of the real economy declined plunging the country into its first recession for many years. The construction sector contracted 23.5%, manufacturing shrunk 9% and the agriculture sector 5.9%. Overall, the country's gross domestic product plunged 6.2% in 1998. During that year, the ringgit plunged below 4.7 and the KLSE fell below 270 points. In September that year, various defensive measures were announced to overcome the crisis.

The principal measure taken were to move the ringgit from a free float to a fixed exchange rate regime. Bank Negara fixed the ringgit at 3.8 to the dollar. Capital controls were imposed while aid offered from the IMF was refused. Various task force agencies were formed. The Corporate Debt Restructuring Committee dealt with corporate loans. Danaharta discounted and bought bad loans from banks to facilitate orderly asset realization. Danamodal recapitalized banks.

Growth then settled at a slower but more sustainable pace. The massive current account deficit became a fairly substantial surplus. Banks were better capitalized and NPLs were realised in an orderly way. Small banks were bought out by strong ones. A large number of PLCs were unable to regulate their financial affairs and were delisted. Compared to the 1997 current account, by 2005, Malaysia was estimated to have a $14.06 billion surplus. Asset values however, have not returned to their pre-crisis highs. Foreign investor confidence was still low, partially due to the lack of transparency shown in how the CLOB counters had been dealt with.

In 2005 the last of the crisis measures were removed as taken off the fixed exchange system. But unlike the pre-crisis days, it did not appear to be a free float, but a managed float, like the Singapore dollar.

=== Mongolia ===
Mongolia was adversely affected by the crisis, and suffered a further loss of income from the spillover effects of the August 1998 Russian financial crisis. Economic growth picked up in 1997–99 after stalling in 1996 due to a series of natural disasters and increases in world prices of copper and cashmere. Public revenues and exports collapsed in 1998 and 1999 due to the repercussions of the Asian financial crisis. In August and September 1999, the economy suffered from a temporary Russian ban on exports of oil and oil products. Mongolia joined the World Trade Organization (WTO) in 1997. The international donor community pledged over $300 million per year at the last Consultative Group Meeting, held in Ulaanbaatar in June 1999.

=== Singapore ===
As the financial crisis spread, the economy of Singapore dipped into a short recession. The short duration and milder effect on its economy was credited to the active management by the government. For example, the Monetary Authority of Singapore allowed for a gradual 20% depreciation of the Singapore dollar to cushion and guide the economy to a soft landing. The timing of government programs such as the Interim Upgrading Program and other construction related projects were brought forward.

Instead of allowing the labor markets to work, the National Wage Council pre-emptively agreed to Central Provident Fund cuts to lower labor costs, with limited impact on disposable income and local demand. Unlike in Hong Kong, no attempt was made to directly intervene in the capital markets and the Straits Times Index was allowed to drop 60%. In less than a year, the Singaporean economy fully recovered and continued on its growth trajectory.

=== Japan ===
The crisis had also put pressure on Japan, whose economy is particularly prominent in the region. Asian countries usually ran a trade deficit with Japan. The Japanese yen fell to 147 as mass selling began, but Japan was the world's largest holder of currency reserves at the time, so it was easily defended, and quickly bounced back. A run on the banks was narrowly averted on 26 November 1997 when TV networks decided not to report on long queues that had formed outside banks, before the central bank had ordered that they be let in. The real GDP growth rate slowed dramatically in 1997, from 5% to 1.6%, and even sank into recession in 1998 due to intense competition from cheapened rivals; also in 1998 the government had to bail out several banks. The Asian financial crisis also led to more bankruptcies in Japan. In addition, with South Korea's devalued currency and China's steady gains, many companies complained outright that they could not compete.

According to Van Sant et al., in August 1997, Japan proposed the establishment of an Asian Monetary Fund (AMF) to address the Asian currency crisis. Japan aimed to reduce its dependence on the United States and increase its autonomy in economic, security, and diplomatic matters. However, the AMF proposal was abandoned due to strong objections from the United States and indifference from China. Instead, Japan announced plans for cooperation loans with international organizations such as the International Monetary Fund, the World Bank, and the Asian Development Bank. In October 1998, Japan proposed providing $30 billion to support Asia, and in December 1998, it proposed a total of $600 billion in special yen credits over the next three years.

A longer-term result was the changing relationship between the United States and Japan, with the United States no longer openly supporting the highly artificial trade environment and exchange rates that governed economic relations between the two countries for almost five decades after World War II.

=== United States ===
The U.S. Treasury was deeply involved with the IMF in finding solutions. The American markets were severely hit. On 27 October 1997, the Dow Jones industrial plunged 554 points or 7.2%, amid ongoing worries about the Asian economies. During the crisis, it fell 12%. The crisis led to a drop in consumer and spending confidence (see 27 October 1997 mini-crash). Nevertheless, the economy grew at a very robust 4.5% for the entire year, and did very well in 1998 as well.

== Consequences ==
=== Asia ===
The crisis had significant macroeconomic-level effects, including sharp reductions in values of currencies, stock markets, and other asset prices of several Asian countries. The nominal U.S. dollar GDP of ASEAN fell by $9.2 billion in 1997 and $218.2 billion (31.7%) in 1998. In South Korea, the $170.9 billion fall in 1998 was equal to 33.1% of the 1997 GDP. Many businesses collapsed, and as a consequence, millions of people fell below the poverty line in 1997–1998. Indonesia, South Korea and Thailand were the countries most affected by the crisis.

Currency	Exchange rate (per US$1)		Change
Currency	June 1997	July 1998	Change
(Thailand) Thai baht	24.5	41	▼40.2%
(Indonesia) Indonesian rupiah	2,380	14,150	▼83.2%
(Philippines) Philippine peso	26.3	42	▼37.4%
(Malaysia) Malaysian ringgit	2.48	4.88	▼49.1%
(South Korea) South Korean won	850	1,290	▼34.1%

Country	GNP (US$1 billion)		Change
Country	June 1997	July 1998	Change
Thailand	170	102	▼40.0%
Indonesia	205	34	▼83.4%
Philippines	75	47	▼37.3%
Malaysia	90	55	▼38.9%
South Korea	430	283	▼34.2%

South Korean won to USD

The above tabulation shows that despite the prompt raising of interest rates to 32% in the Philippines upon the onset of crisis in mid-July 1997, and to 65% in Indonesia upon the intensification of crisis in 1998, their local currencies depreciated just the same and did not perform better than those of South Korea, Thailand, and Malaysia, which countries had their high interest rates set at generally lower than 20% during the Asian crisis. This created grave doubts on the credibility of IMF and the validity of its high-interest-rate prescription to economic crisis.

The economic crisis also led to a political upheaval, most notably culminating in the resignations of President Suharto in Indonesia and Prime Minister General Chavalit Yongchaiyudh in Thailand. There was a general rise in anti-Western sentiment, with George Soros and the IMF in particular singled out as targets of criticisms. Heavy U.S. investment in Thailand ended, replaced by mostly European investment, though Japanese investment was sustained. Islamic and other separatist movements intensified in Southeast Asia as central authorities weakened.

New regulations weakened the influence of the bamboo network, a network of overseas Chinese family-owned businesses that dominate the private sector of Southeast Asia. After the crisis, business relationships were more frequently based on contracts, rather than the trust and family ties of the traditional bamboo network.

More long-term consequences included reversal of some gains made in the boom years just preceding the crisis. Nominal U.S. dollar GNP per capita fell 42.3% in Indonesia in 1997, 21.2% in Thailand, 19% in Malaysia, 18.5% in South Korea and 12.5% in the Philippines. Falls in income per capita with purchasing power parity were much smaller: in Indonesia by 15%, Thailand 12%, Malaysia 10%, South Korea 6%, Philippines 3%. In most countries recovery was fast. Between 1999 and 2005 average per capita annual growth was 8.2%, investment growth nearly 9%, foreign direct investment 17.5%. Precrisis levels of income per capita with purchasing power parity were exceeded in 1999 in South Korea, in 2000 in Philippines, in 2002 in Malaysia and Thailand, in 2005 in Indonesia. Within East Asia, the bulk of investment and a significant amount of economic weight shifted from Japan and ASEAN to China and India.

The crisis has been intensively analyzed by economists for its breadth, speed, and dynamism; it affected dozens of countries, had a direct impact on the livelihood of millions, happened within the course of a mere few months, and at each stage of the crisis leading economists, in particular the international institutions, seemed a step behind. Perhaps more interesting to economists was the speed with which it ended, leaving most of the developed economies unharmed. These curiosities have prompted an explosion of literature about financial economics and a litany of explanations why the crisis occurred. A number of critiques have been leveled against the conduct of the IMF in the crisis, including one by former World Bank economist Joseph Stiglitz. Politically there were some benefits. In several countries, particularly South Korea and Indonesia, there was renewed push for improved corporate governance. Rampaging inflation weakened the authority of the Suharto regime and led to its toppling in 1998, as well as accelerating East Timor's independence.

It is believed that 10,400 people committed suicide in Hong Kong, Japan and South Korea as a result of the crisis.

In August 2001, the International Labour Organization arranged the Thirteenth Asian Regional Meeting with 39 member states as a result of the financial crisis. It focused on providing social protection, rights at work and creating new jobs.

=== Outside Asia ===
After the Asian crisis, international investors were reluctant to lend to developing countries, leading to economic slowdowns in developing countries in many parts of the world. The powerful negative shock also sharply reduced the price of oil, which reached a low of about $11 per barrel towards the end of 1998, causing a financial pinch in OPEC nations and other oil exporters. In response to a severe fall in oil prices, the supermajors that emerged in the late-1990s, undertook some major mergers and acquisitions between 1998 and 2002 – often in an effort to improve economies of scale, hedge against oil price volatility, and reduce large cash reserves through reinvestment.

The reduction in oil revenue also contributed to the 1998 Russian financial crisis, which in turn caused Long-Term Capital Management in the United States to collapse after losing $4.6 billion in 4 months. A wider collapse in the financial markets was avoided when Alan Greenspan and the Federal Reserve Bank of New York organized a $3.625 billion bailout. Major emerging economies Brazil and Argentina also fell into crisis in the late 1990s (see 1998–2002 Argentine great depression). The September 11 attacks contributed to major shockwave in developed and developing economies (see Stock market downturn of 2002).

The crisis in general was part of a global backlash against the Washington Consensus and institutions such as the IMF and World Bank, which simultaneously became unpopular in developed countries following the rise of the anti-globalization movement in 1999. It was a major cause for the beginning of the current anti-globalism movement and many nationalist movements. Four major rounds of world trade talks since the crisis, in Seattle, Doha, Cancún, and Hong Kong, have failed to produce a significant agreement as developing countries have become more assertive, and nations are increasingly turning toward regional or bilateral free trade agreements (FTAs) as an alternative to global institutions.

Many nations learned from this, and quickly built up foreign exchange reserves as a hedge against attacks, including Japan, China, South Korea. Pan Asian currency swaps were introduced in the event of another crisis. China, in particular, bought up the government debt of the United States to protect itself. However, nations such as Brazil, Russia, and India as well as most of East Asia began copying the Japanese model of weakening their currencies, and restructuring their economies so as to create a current account surplus to build large foreign currency reserves. This has led to ever-increasing funding for U.S. treasury bonds, allowing or aiding housing (in 2001–2005) and stock asset bubbles (in 1996–2000) to develop in the United States, setting the factors that led to the 2008 financial crisis.

== See also ==
- 1998 Russian financial crisis, partly connected to the 1997 Asian financial crisis
- Samba effect
- Bamboo network
- Asian Spring

General:

- 1990s Chinese bank restructurings
- 1991 Indian economic crisis
- Financial contagion
- Liquidity crisis
- 2008 financial crisis
- Stock market crashes in Hong Kong
- Stock market crash
- Stock market crashes in India
- List of stock market crashes and bear markets
