= 1990s Chinese bank restructurings =

Throughout the 1990s, China's banking system underwent systemic restructurings. The Chinese government took several major steps to recapitalize its banks and to reduce non-performing loans (NPLs).

== Overview ==
Like many of the countries directly affected by the 1997 Asian financial crisis, Chinese bank NPLs grew substantially (with some estimates reaching as high as 42% of the big four banks' loan balance). This forced Chinese authorities to establish asset management companies (AMCs) in order to purchase NPLs and affect a bank recapitalization.

Economists suggest that the effective recapitalization of the big four banks might not be as large as the headline NPL number would suggest and they also criticize that the PBOC's balance sheet clearly suffered.
