= Robillard =

Robillard may refer to:

- Robillard (surname)
- Robillard Glacier, Antarctica
- Presqu'île-Robillard Ecological Reserve, Argenteuil, Quebec, Canada
- Complexe sportif Claude-Robillard, a multi-purpose sports facility in Montreal, Quebec
- Robillard Block, Montreal, Quebec, Canada, a building that held the first cinema in Canada
