= Contagion =

Contagion may refer to:

== Medicine ==
- Contagious disease

== Social science ==
- Social contagion, the spontaneous spread of thoughts, feelings, or behaviors through a group or network
- Emotional contagion, a tendency to feel others' emotions
- Behavioral contagion, a tendency to mimic others' behavior
- Law of contagion, a folk belief related to magical thinking
- Financial contagion, a scenario in which financial shocks spread to other financial sectors
- Hysterical contagion, an effect in which a group exhibits physical symptoms due to a psychological cause
- Sacred contagion, the belief that spiritual properties pass from one entity to another
- Complex contagion, a social networking phenomenon
- Contagion heuristic, a psychological technique

== Film and television ==
- Contagion (1987 film), directed by Karl Zwicky
- Contagion (2002 film), featuring Bruce Boxleitner
- Contagion (2011 film), directed by Steven Soderbergh
- "Contagion" (Star Trek: The Next Generation), 1989 TV episode

== Music ==
- Contagion (Oceano album), 2010
- "Contagion", a song by Black Dahlia Murder on the 2003 album Unhallowed

== Other uses ==
- Contagion (novel), by Robin Cook
- Batman: Contagion, a comic book story arc
- Coded Arms: Contagion, a 2007 video game
- Contagion (video game), a 2014 video game

== See also ==
- Contagious (disambiguation)
