= Contagious (magazine) =

Contagious is an advertising magazine that is published quarterly by Contagious Communications, a total communications resource for the global marketing community. It was founded in 2004 by Paul Kemp-Robertson, former director of creative resources at advertising company Leo Burnett Worldwide and editor of Shots magazine, and Gee Thomson, author of Mesmerization and co-founder of Shots magazine.

== About ==
Contagious was launched in 2004 to explore the relationship between brands and consumers, to predict the impact of new technologies and to make sense of the fragmenting media landscape. Contagious was originally sold with a DVD showcasing over 100 pieces of creative work per issue; each campaign is presented in a ‘challenge/solution/results’ format. The DVD content is stored in a searchable database online, available to subscribers. Later, this was updated to a subscriber database. Contagious also distributes news stories online through a free weekly newsletter.

Contagious curates and contributes to conferences and industry events and publishes a series of in-depth specialist reports that analyze some of the key topics and trends affecting the business of advertising.

Contagious’ audience includes local and multinational advertisers, as well as creative directors, strategic planners, CEOs and new business directors from communications companies around the world.

== Awards ==
- "Best Designed Business to Business Magazine", 2008, Magazine Design and Journalism Awards
- "Best Designed Business to Business Front Cover", 2007, Magazine Design and Journalism Awards
- "Best Designed Business to Business Front Cover", 2005, Magazine Design and Journalism Awards
