= Financial contagion =

Scenario in which financial shocks spread to other financial sectors

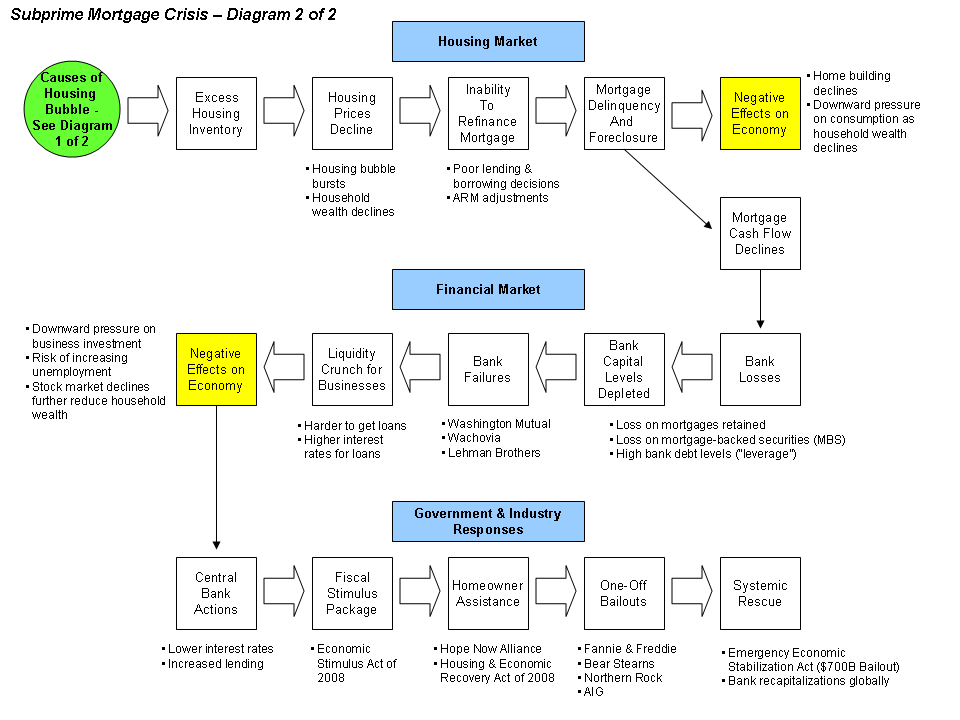
Subprime Crisis Diagram

Financial contagion refers to "the spread of market disturbances—mostly on the downside—from one country to the other, a process observed through co-movements in exchange rates, stock prices, sovereign spreads, and capital flows". Financial contagion can be a potential risk for countries who are trying to integrate their financial system with international financial markets and institutions. It helps explain an economic crisis extending across neighboring countries, or even regions.

Financial contagion happens at both the international level and the domestic level. At the domestic level, usually the failure of a domestic bank or financial intermediary triggers transmission when it defaults on interbank liabilities and sells assets in a fire sale, thereby undermining confidence in similar banks. An example of this phenomenon is the subsequent turmoil in the financial markets. International financial contagion, which happens in both advanced economies and developing economies, is the transmission of financial crisis across financial markets for direct or indirect economies. However, under today's financial system, with the large volume of cash flow, such as hedge fund and cross-regional operation of large banks, financial contagion usually happens simultaneously both among domestic institutions and across countries. The cause of financial contagion usually is beyond the explanation of real economy, such as the bilateral trade volume.

The term financial contagion has created controversy throughout the past years. Some argue that strong linkages between countries are not necessarily financial contagion, and that financial contagion should be defined as an increase in cross-market linkages after a shock to one country, which is very hard to figure out by both theoretical model and empirical work. Also, some scholars argue that there is actually no contagion at all, just a high level of market co-movement in all periods, which is market "interdependence".

More generally, there is controversy surrounding the usefulness of "contagion" as a metaphor to describe the "catchiness" of social phenomena, as well as debate about the application of context-specific models and concepts from biomedicine and epidemiology to explain the diffusion of perturbations within financial systems.

== Causes and consequences ==
Financial contagion can create financial volatility and can seriously damage the economy and financial systems of countries. There are several branches of classifications that explain the mechanism of financial contagion, which are spillover effects and financial crisis that are caused by the influence of the four agents' behavior. The four agents that influence financial globalization are governments, financial institutions, investors, and borrowers.

The first branch, spill-over effects, can be seen as the negative externalities. Spillover effects are also known as fundamental-based contagion. These effects can happen either globally, heavily affecting many countries in the world, or regionally, affecting only neighboring countries. The big players, who are more of the larger countries, usually have a global effect. The smaller countries are the players who usually have a regional effect. "These forms of co-movements would not normally constitute contagion, but if they occur during a period of crisis and their effect is adverse, they may be expressed as contagion."

"Fundamental causes of contagion include macroeconomic shocks that have repercussions on an international scale and local shocks transmitted through trade links, competitive devaluations, and financial links." It can lead to some co-movements in capital flows and asset prices. Common shocks can be similar to the effects of financial links. "A financial crisis in one country can lead to direct financial effects, including reductions in trade credits, foreign direct investment, and other capital flows abroad." Financial links come from financial globalization since countries try to be more economically integrated with global financial markets. Allen and Gale (2000), and Lagunoff and Schreft (2001) analyze financial contagion as a result of linkages among financial intermediaries. The former provide a general equilibrium model to explain a small liquidity preference shock in one region can spread by contagion throughout the economy and the possibility of contagion depends strongly on the completeness of the structure of interregional claims. The latter proposed a dynamic stochastic game-theoretic model of financial fragility, through which they explain interrelated portfolios and payment commitments forge financial linkages among agents and thus make two related types of the financial crisis can occur in response.

Trade links is another type of shock that has its similarities to common shocks and financial links. These types of shocks are more focused on its integration causing local impacts. "Any major trading partner of a country in which a financial crisis has induced a sharp current depreciation could experience declining asset prices and large capital outflows or could become the target of a speculative attack as investors anticipate a decline in exports to the crisis country and hence a deterioration in the trade account." Kaminsky and Reinhart (2000) document the evidence that trade links in goods and services and exposure to a common creditor can explain earlier crises clusters, not only the debt crisis of the early 1980s and 1990s, but also the observed historical pattern of contagion.

Competitive devaluation is also associated with financial contagion. Competitive devaluation, which is also known as a currency war, is when multiple countries compete against one another to gain a competitive advantage by having low exchange rates for their currency. "Devaluation in a country hit by a crisis reduces the export competitiveness of the countries with which it competes in third markets, putting pressure on the currencies of other countries; especially when those currencies do not float freely." This action causes countries to act irrationally due to fear and doubt. "If market participants expect that a currency crisis will lead to a game of competitive devaluation, they will naturally sell their holdings of securities of other countries, curtail their lending, or refuse to roll over short-term loans to borrowers in those countries."

Another branch of contagion is a financial crisis, which is also referred to irrational phenomena. A financial crisis as a branch of contagion is formed when "a co-movement occurs, even when there are no global shocks and interdependence and fundamentals are not factors." It is caused by any of the four agents' behaviors who influence financial globalization. Some examples that can cause contagion are increased risk aversion, lack of confidence, and financial fears. Under the correlated information channel, price changes in one market are perceived as having implications for the values of assets in other markets, causing their prices to change as well (King and Wadhwani (1990)). Also, Calvo (2004) argues for correlated liquidity shock channel meaning that when some market participants need to liquidate and withdraw some of their assets to obtain cash, perhaps after experiencing an unexpected loss in another country and need to restore capital adequacy ratios. This behavior will effectively transmit the shock.

Out of the four agents, an investor's behavior seems to be one of the biggest one that can impact a country's financial system. There are three different types of investor behaviors, which generally are considered rational or irrational and individually or collectively.

The first type of behavior is when "investors take action that is ex-ante individually rational but lead to excessive co-movements – excessive in the sense that they cannot be explained by real fundamentals." It breaks down into two sub-categories, liquidity and incentive problems and information asymmetries and coordination problems. The first sub-category is liquidity and incentive problems. A reduction of equity prices can result in a loss of money for investors. "These losses may induce investors to sell off securities in other markets to raise cash in anticipation of a higher frequency of redemptions." These liquidity problems are also challenges for banks, specifically commercial banks. Incentive problems can also have the same effects as liquidity problems. For instance, the first signs of a crisis may cause investors to sell their holdings in some countries, resulting in equity and different asset markets in economies to decline in value. This causes the value of currencies in these economies to also decrease. The second sub-category is information asymmetries and coordination problems. This type of investor behavior can either be considered rational or irrational. This sub-category is when one group, or country, has more or significantly better information compared to another group or country. This can cause a market failure problem, which could potentially cause a financial crisis.

The second type of investor behavior concentrates on multiple equilibriums. It focuses on the investor's behavioral changes when the financial market can have multiple equilibrium changes. Thus, "contagion occurs when a crisis in one financial market causes another financial market to move or jump to a bad equilibrium, characterized by a devaluation, a drop in asset prices, capital outflows, or debt default." The third type of behavior is when there is a change in the international financial system, or in the rules of the game. It can make investors adjust their behaviors after a financial transaction occurs internationally or an initial crisis occurs. These behaviors can lead to spillover effect, causing contagion.

In addition, there are some less-developed explanations for financial contagion. Some explanations for financial contagion, especially after the Russian default in 1998, are based on changes in investor "psychology", "attitude", and "behavior". This stream of research date back to early studies of crowd psychology of Mackay (1841) and classical early models of disease diffusion were applied to financial markets by Shiller (1984). Also, Kirman (1993) analyses a simple model of influence that is motivated by the foraging behavior of ants, but applicable, he argues, to the behaviour of stock market investors. Faced with a choice between two identical piles of food, ants switch periodically from one pile to the other. Kirman supposes that there are N ants and that each switch randomly between piles with probability ε (this prevents the system getting stuck with all at one pile or the other), and imitates a randomly chosen other ant with probability δ. Eichengreen, Hale and Mody (2001) focus on the transmission of recent crises through the market for developing country debt. They find the impact of changes in market sentiment tends to be limited to the original region. They also find market sentiments can more influence prices but less on quantities in Latin America, compared with Asian countries.

Besides, there are some researches on geographic factors driving the contagion. De Gregorio and Valdes (2001) examine how the 1982 debt crisis, the 1994 Mexican crisis, and the 1997 Asian crisis spread to a sample of twenty other countries. They find that a neighborhood effect is the strongest determinant of which countries suffer from contagion. Trade links and pre-crisis growth similarities are also important, although to a lesser extent than the neighborhood effect.

== History ==
The term "contagion" was first introduced in July 1997, when the currency crisis in Thailand quickly spread throughout East Asia and then on to Russia and Brazil. Even developed markets in North America and Europe were affected, as the relative prices of financial instruments shifted and caused the collapse of Long-Term Capital Management (LTCM), a large U.S. hedge fund. The financial crisis beginning from Thailand with the collapse of the Thai baht spread to Indonesia, the Philippines, Malaysia, South Korea and Hong Kong in less than two months. This caused economists to realize the importance of financial contagion and produced a large volume of researches on it. Yet, there were episodes of international financial crisis that occurred before the introduction of the term contagion.

Some analysts, including Bordo and Murshid, identify the crisis that happened in 1825 as the first international financial crisis. "The liberation of Latin American in the early 1820s led to a massive inflow of capital from Britain to finance the exploitation of gold and silver mines and of sovereign loans to the newly independent republics." Between new industries beginning to grow, an increase in foreign influence, and a liberal monetary expansion after the Napoleonic Wars, there was an increase in irrationality on the London Stock Exchange. As a result, the bank decided to increase its discount rate. The stock market crashed in October, which triggered a banking crisis around December. This crisis spread throughout the continent. "This crisis spread to Latin America as the overseas loans were cut off, a decline in investment and exports reduced tax revenues and led to sovereign debt defaults across the region."

One of the biggest worldwide crises was the stock market crash on Wall Street in October 1929. The failure from 1929 to 1933 was foreshadowed by collapses in commodity prices in multiple emerging nations. The stock market boom in New York by 1928 choked off U.S. capital flows to central Europe and Latin America and precipitated currency crises in a number of countries (Australia, Argentina, Uruguay, and Brazil) and early in 1929. The Wall Street crash caused stock market scares globally. This is known as the Great Depression. The U.S. crisis in 1929 turned into the Great Depression by 1930 and 1931 because the Federal Reserve was unsuccessful at relieving multiple banking panics. The resultant collapse in prices and output worldwide forced sovereign borrowers to cut back on servicing their debts and then to default, precipitating a collapse of foreign lending in 1931.

One of the contributors to the 1997 Asian financial crisis was excessive borrowing by national banks. National banks continuously borrowed from countries abroad and continuously lent within their own country. At the time, it did not seem excessive, but it appeared so in the aftermath. Bad loans were made, risks were taken due to misunderstandings, and the level of debt continued to grow. "After the start of the crisis, national equity betas increased and average returns fell substantially". The first currency that faced problems was the Thai baht. With the Thai baht having issues, it doubled the debt of Thai organizations, which started the spread of the crisis to other countries. As this was happening, investors started reevaluating their investments in this region. This caused the flow of money to disappear rapidly, resulting in the growth of this crisis.

The crisis of 2007–08 has been identified as the most severe since the 1930 Great Depression. Major financial institutions around the world were greatly affected. The history of the 2007–08 crisis traces back to the bursting of the housing bubble in the United States, and the increase in mortgage defaults. This came about as a result of the mandate by the U.S. Congress for the Federal National Mortgage to increase access to low-income housing. As a result of the high default rates, many financial institutions across the U.S. were affected. Although the U.S. government had attempted to salvage the situation through liquidity doses, the crisis further deepened. By March 2008, Bear Sterns, a U.S. investment bank, required the efforts of the government to be rescued. At this stage, it was clear that the crisis had deepened. Other financial institutions, such as the Lehman bank and American International Group (AIG), started to feel the effects of the crisis. The severity of this crisis grew, and most U.S. and European banks were pulling back their international loans. This move caused major financial problems across the world, especially for those countries that rely heavily on international borrowing. Financial contagion was felt severely, especially in countries whose financial systems were vulnerable due to local housing bubbles and current account deficits. Some of the countries affected were Germany, Iceland, Spain, Britain and New Zealand among others. Many analysts and governments had failed to predict the real effects of the crisis. As major economies of the world started to feel the effects of the crisis, nearly every economy was affected directly or indirectly. In particular, there was a drop in exports and a lowering of commodity prices.

== Policy implications ==
Financial contagion is one of the main causes of financial regulation. A top priority for both domestic financial regulators and international organizations is to prevent financial contagion using financial regulation and planning the international financial architecture. This priority was especially important during the 2007-2008 period, when global economies were under challenge from the U.S. subprime mortgage crisis and Euro area crisis.

At the international level, under today's modern financial systems, a complicated web of claims and obligations link the balance sheets of a wide variety of intermediaries, such as hedge funds and banks, into a global financial network. The development of sophisticated financial products, such as credit default swaps and collateralized debt obligations, has complicated the financial regulation. As has been shown by the U.S. financial recession, the trigger of failure of Lehman Brothers dramatically spread the shock to the whole financial system and other financial markets. Therefore, understanding the reasons and mechanisms of international financial contagion can help policy makers improve the global financial regulation system and thus make it more resistant to shocks and contagions.

At domestic level, financial fragility is always associated with a short maturity of outstanding debt as well as contingent public liabilities. Therefore, a better domestic financial regulation structure can improve an economy's liquidity and limit its exposure to contagion. A better understanding of financial contagion between financial intermediaries, including banking, rating agencies and hedge funds will be conducive to making financial reform in both U.S. and European Countries. For example, financial reformers study how to set up the capital ratio to balance maximizing banks' profit and shielding banks from shocks and contagions.

== Econometric models ==
The econometric literature on testing for contagion has focused on increases in the correlation of returns between markets during periods of crisis. Forbes and Rigobon (2002) described the current imprecision and disagreement surrounding the term contagion. It proposes a concrete definition, a significant increase in cross-market linkages after a shock, and suggests using the term "interdependence" in order to differentiate this explicit definition from the existing literature. It shows the elementary weakness of simple correlation tests: with an unchanged regression coefficient, a rise in the variance of the explanatory variable reduces the coefficient standard error, causing a rise in the correlation of a regression.

=== General models ===
Let $\mathcal{V}$ is the set of financial assets and $p_v(t)$ be the price of asset $v \in \mathcal{V}$ at time $t$. A network with contagion is defined in matrix form as $\Gamma(t) \in \{0,1\}^{n \times n}$, whose $(v, \, v^{\prime})$ component represents the connection between two stocks $v$ and $v^{\prime}$. In vector notation, the standard model for contagion tests can be written as a VAR (vector autoregression) model of order $\tau$:

$$\ln\mathbf{p}(t) \,=\,  \Gamma(t-1) \ln \mathbf{p}(t-1) \,+\, \ldots \,+\, \Gamma(t-\tau) \ln \mathbf{p}(t-\tau) \,+\, \epsilon_v(t),$$

where $\epsilon_v(t_i)$ is a random term. In their specific application, Forbes and Rigobon (2002) estimated a variant of this model to study contagion between countries. They first estimated the variance-covariance matrices for each pair of countries during the stable period, turmoil period, and full period. Then, they use the estimated variance-covariance matrices to calculate the cross-market correlation coefficients (and their asymptotic distributions) for each set of markets and periods.

As Pesaran and Pick (2007) observe, however, financial contagion is a difficult system to estimate econometrically. To disentangle contagion from interaction effects, county-specific variables have to be used to instrument foreign returns. Choosing the crisis period introduces sample selection bias, and it has to be assumed that crisis periods are sufficiently long to allow correlations to be reliably estimated. In consequence, there appears to be no strong consensus in the empirical literature as to whether contagion occurs between markets, or how strong it is.

The financial and economic literature presents ample evidence that in time of crisis co-movements between the returns of assets increase. This increase in correlation between the returns of the loans' collateral causes an increase in the volatility of bank assets and, therefore an increase in the value of the bank's stock and its cost of default, while decreasing the value of its debt. The increase in correlation can be explained by a procyclical forbearance policy of regulators. Since regulators have greater forbearance during systemic crises, the increase in correlation creates incentives for banks to herd and become interconnected so that when they fail, they fail together, increasing their chances of being bailed-out. Peleg and Raviv (2018) shows that as the correlation between the returns of bank's borrowers' increases, asset risk increases as well. Thus an increase in co-movement of a bank's loan portfolio increases the bank's cost of default through a second channel: an increase in risk shifting.

=== Multi-channel models ===
Recently, Nasini and Erdemlioglu have proposed a model to study how the effects on stock price dynamics of different network propagation channels vary according to the state of the economy. Drawing on the view that decisions and outcomes of financial firms are influenced by multiple network channels, they studied the stock price dynamics of listed enterprises connected by supply-chain relationships, competition linkages and business partnerships.

Let $s_{v}(t)$ be the market value of asset $v \in \mathcal{V}$, defined as the share price times the number of shares outstanding: $s_v(t) = p_v(t)\nu_v(t)$. At each moment in time $t$, a network with connection of type $c \in \mathcal{C}$ is defined in matrix form as $\Gamma(t,c) \in \{0,1\}^{n \times n}$, whose $(v, \, v^{\prime})$ component represents the $c^{th}$ connection between two stocks $v$ and $v^{\prime}$. Define $\hat{s}_{v,v^{\prime}}(\ell) = \sum_{c} \beta_{c \ell} s^{\Delta}_{v, v^{\prime}}(t-\ell) \gamma_{v,v^{\prime}}(c)$, where $s^{\Delta}_{v, v^{\prime}}(t-\ell)$ quantifies the difference between the market value of $v$ and $v^{\prime}$. The financial econometric model of Nasini and Erdemlioglu can be written as

$$p_v(t) ~=~ \eta_v(t) \prod_{\ell = 1}^{\tau} \prod_{v^{\prime} \in \mathcal{V}} p_{v^{\prime}}(t_{i-\ell})^{ \hat{s}_{v,v^{\prime}}(\ell)  },$$

where $\eta_v(t)$ is a random term. They derived an important relationship between this model and the classical Fama–French three-factor model. Let $q_{v,v^{\prime}}(c, t-\ell) = hat{\gamma}_{v,v^{\prime}}(c) \ln p_{v^{\prime}}(t-\ell)$, and $s_{\max}(t)$ and $s_{\min}(t)$ be the maximum and the minimum market capitalization among the $n$ listed enterprises at time $t$ and consider $SMB(t) = s_{\min}(t) - s_{\max}(t)$ (small minus big) and $SOB(t) = s_{\min}(t)/s_{\max}(t)$ (small over big). When $s^{\Delta}_{v, v^{\prime}}(t-\ell) = s_v^{\prime}(t-\ell) - s_{v}(t-\ell)$, well known properties of the log-normal distribution implies

$$\mathbb{E}\left[ p_v(t) ~|~ \boldsymbol{\beta}_{\tau_{\min}} \ldots \boldsymbol{\beta}_{\tau_{\max}} \right] \leq \mathbb{E}\left[ p_v(t) ~|~ \boldsymbol{\beta}_{\tau_{\min}}^{SMB} \ldots \boldsymbol{\beta}_{\tau_{\max}}^{SMB} \right],$$

where $\beta_{c,\ell}^{SMB} = \beta_{c,\ell} SMB(t-\ell)$. Similarly, when $s^{\Delta}_{v, v^{\prime}}(t-\ell) = s_v^{\prime}(t-\ell) - s_{v}(t-\ell)$,

$$\mathbb{E}\left[ p_v(t) ~|~ \boldsymbol{\beta}_{\tau_{\min}} \ldots \boldsymbol{\beta}_{\tau_{\max}} \right] \leq \mathbb{E}\left[ p_v(t) ~|~ \boldsymbol{\beta}_{\tau_{\min}}^{SOB} \ldots \boldsymbol{\beta}_{\tau_{\max}}^{SMO} \right],$$

Next to it, their approach allows decomposing the financial dynamics into networks propagation and firms structural positions effects.

== See also ==
- Financial crisis
- Flight-to-liquidity
- Stock market crash
- Currency crisis
- Systemic risk
- Viral phenomenon
