= Marc Robillard =

Canadian musician, composer and songwriter

- Born: March 23, 1974 (age 52); Montreal, Quebec, Canada
- Genres: pop rock
- Occupations: Musician and singer-songwriter
- Instruments: Guitar, piano and vocals
- Label: MTV
- Website: marcrobillard.com

Marc Robillard (born March 23, 1974) is a Canadian musician, composer and songwriter, residing in Venice, California. He is best known for his songs "So Much More" (featured on a nationwide Sun Chips commercial) and "Contagious" (featured on MTV's Jersey Shore).

== Early life ==
Born in Montreal, Quebec, Robillard grew up traveling across Canada playing competitive hockey, eventually settling in Halifax where he was then drafted to play in the Ontario Hockey League.

== Career ==
Robillard first broke into the music industry through his work in music production. He worked in several music studios in Halifax and Toronto while he began writing his first EP. While composing music for Toronto production company, Grayson Matthews, in 2005, Robillard released his debut album, Paper Airplanes. Songs from his debut album have appeared in several television commercials and programs since their release; "So Much More" was featured in Frito Lay's green television commercial for a biodegradable Sunchips bag as well as in the "Happy Planet" documentary in 2010.

Robillard's sophomore album, Left London, was released in March 2011, inspired by his time spent living and working in London and his subsequent journey to Los Angeles. Robillard was chosen by MTV and Extreme Music to be a part of their HYPE music project, which showcases up and coming artists from around the world. His music, along with 11 other musician's work, was featured throughout MTV's programming and live performances beginning in June 2011. MTV's reality television series, Jersey Shore, has featured "Come By Now," "Contagious," "Blown Away," "EverStop" and "OK." MTV re-released Robillard's debut EP, Paper Airplanes, and his new album, Left London, under the MTV umbrella in July 2011.

Outside of the MTV Hype project, he appeared in ABC’s Rookie Blue, USA’s Necessary Roughness, VH1’s The TO show, and Teen Nick’s Degrassi.

== Other work ==
Beyond the placements of his original songs, Robillard has composed original music for Kraft. His song, "I’ll Be With You" was featured in Kraft's new advertising campaign.

His influences include Conor Oberst/Bright Eyes, Ben Gibbard/Death Cab for Cutie, Radiohead, Travis, Athlete, Coldplay, Aqualung, Damien Rice, and Wilco.
