= 2011 Greek economy referendum attempt =

A referendum to decide whether or not Greece was to accept the conditions under which the European Union (EU), the International Monetary Fund (IMF) and the European Central Bank (ECB) would allow a 50% haircut of Greek debt owed to private creditors was planned to be held in 2011. However, Prime Minister George Papandreou decided to cancel the referendum on 3 November, if the opposition parties vote in favour of the EU deal. The proposed referendum was later cancelled.

== Background ==
On 31 October 2011, Prime Minister George Papandreou announced the referendum saying that: "We need wide consensus (for the aid programme). We are part of the eurozone [which means] many rights and many obligations. We will live up to our obligations."

Constitutional issues have arisen with regards to such a referendum, as Article 44 of the constitution of Greece specifies that referendums on critical national matters and social bills are permitted while referendums on fiscal bills are not. This was to be Greece's first referendum not having to do with a change in the form of government, and the first referendum since 1974.

== Date ==
Papandreou suggested the referendum would be held on 4 December. However, Finance Minister Evangelos Venizelos specified that the referendum would take place in 2012, after the plans for the haircut had been finalised. Other sources put the date of the referendum to December 2011. According to Nicolas Sarkozy the referendum would have taken place on 4 or 5 December 2011.

== Opinion polls ==
Polls in Greece suggested that up to 60% of Greeks were against the deal reached with the EU over Greek debt on 27 October 2011, however a survey in September 2011 showed that 63% of Greeks viewed the euro as something positive. The same survey showed that 66% of Greeks viewed the return to the drachma as something negative.

== Response ==
=== Domestic ===
The initial response of the Greek political parties was negative. New Democracy leader Antonis Samaras described it as an "indirect national schism", while most opposition parties demanded elections and condemned the government for what they perceived to be a manoeuvre to avoid early elections. Konstantinos Mitsotakis, Prime Minister of Greece between 1990 and 1993, described the move to hold a referendum as utterly irrational and irresponsible. The Greek media also adopted a negative stance, with many calling it a coercive move.

Following the announcement of the referendum on 31 October 2011, 1 November saw the resignation of one MP from the ruling party, lowering Papandreou's government majority to 152 seats in the 300-seat Hellenic Parliament. An additional six members of Papandreou's Panhellenic Socialist Movement have demanded early elections.

In the early hours of 2 November 2011, George Papandreou and his cabinet decided to speed up the referendum process, and attacked the Greek media by calling them bankrupt and accusing them of having "gone mad" over the referendum. Additionally the cabinet decided that a committee would be set up to decide the time when the referendum would take place and the question that people would be asked to vote on, but only after the basic characteristics of the new memorandum with the Troika had been decided. During that cabinet meeting, a number of ministers expressed concerns over the referendum.

==== Financial markets ====
The Athex stock market index fell amid concerns for instability, as well as global financial markets on concerns about EU stability and a possible Greek default on its debt.

==== Cancellation ====
On 3 November, Papandreou canceled the referendum plans, saying that a referendum was unnecessary as the opposition New Democracy Party had indicated that it would support an agreement with European leaders on writing down Greece's sovereign debt in exchange for the adoption of austerity measures and a commitment to maintaining the euro. The cancelation occurred following the opposition of Finance Minister Evangelos Venizelos, and amid calls for Papandreou to resign.

In response, global financial markets rose. Following an emergency visit to Cannes for the 2011 G-20 Cannes summit, where Papandreou faced pressure to call off the referendum, New Democracy's spokesman Yiannis Michelakis said that "the comments made by Mr Papandreou, as well as those by [French President] Nicolas Sarkozy and [German Chancellor] Angela Merkel, revealed that he suggested to them that in Greece there is a supposed questioning of whether Greece should remain in the eurozone and the European Union. It is clear that no such problem exists and that Mr Papandreou – through sudden and despicable misinformation – is trying to create it himself." Party chairperson Antonis Samaras also said that "the only problem that exists is Mr Papandreou remaining as prime minister,” said Michelakis. “He is dangerous and he has to go."

The referendum was later canceled amidst domestic and foreign pressure. U.S. President Barack Obama said that though the G20 summit in Cannes sought to alleviate European sovereign debt concerns the "actions of Papandreou and the referendum issue got a lot of people nervous" and the EU proposal was "still the best recipe." Dutch Prime Minister Mark Rutte said the cancellation was a good decision amidst possible eurozone impatience with Greece. "It was a bizarre proposal. We think it’s of great importance to the eurozone that we prevent Greece from going bankrupt. But in the end, the euro is more important than Greece’s membership of the eurozone." Conversely former German Chancellor Gerhard Schroeder said that: "It’s no surprise Papandreou hardly had a chance to push through what was being demanded from him. The conservatives across Europe did very little to convince the Greek conservative opposition to stop acting irresponsibly."

==== Vote of confidence ====
During discussions for a vote of confidence held on 4 November 2011, Evangelos Venizelos, the Greek Minister of Finance, expressed his view that the decision on whether or not Greece should remain in the Eurozone is not something that should not be put to a referendum, and called for a government of national unity. On 3 November, two other members of Papandreou's parliamentary group announced they would not give the government a vote of confidence. This lowered the ruling party's parliamentary group votes to 150, which was below the threshold for majority in the parliament (151 seats). Dimitris Lintzeris, a PASOK MP, said that "Papandreou is past" and that "he continues to act carelessly and turns his failure into a coercive [referendum]".

Amid concerns that Greece could leave the eurozone dependent on the referendum result, Papandreou faced a vote of confidence in parliament on 4 November. He said that "I ask for the vote of confidence to avert the instability that would be caused if the country is dragged into elections. Now is the time for cooperation with good intentions and a feeling of national responsibility." Before the vote he pledged to step down saying that re-election was not important to him, thus avoiding infighting within PASOK; he also said that he would seek a coalition government for four months in order to pass the new EU debt agreement, though New Democracy rejected such a motion to join a coalition government. The motion passed with a vote of 153-145 in the 300 seat parliament, after PASOK's 152 MPs and Louka Katseli, formerly a member of PASOK, supported the prime minister. She was then brought back into the party fold.

===== New government =====
Following the vote of confidence, Papandreou met President Karolos Papoulias the next day to begin talks on forming a new coalition government. Papandreou also said that he would resign and allow another interim prime minister. Though New Democracy's Samaras demanded a snap election, an interim coalition government could have possibly involved Popular Orthodox Rally, Democratic Alliance and/or the Democratic Left. However, Democratic Alliance chairperson Dora Bakoyannis said that an interim government to pass the EU demanded austerity measures must include New Democracy to make the government viable. Bakoyiannis also added that "there is no point in us supporting Papandreou without Samaras, we don't have enough votes to make a difference anyway. We'll support a coalition and vote with them, without any demands of positions, if Papandreou and Samaras can work it out." Though Samaras continued to demand a new election in saying that was the only option for "stabilisation of the country, to restore its image, and to emerge sooner from this nightmare," he also added that an interim coalition government was a good idea in order to pass the bailout bill. Papandreou also said that: "My aim is to immediately create a government of co-operation. A lack of consensus would worry our European partners about our country's membership of the eurozone." He added that forming a coalition meant that he would "do whatever I can to help form a coalition government. The Oct. 26 decisions and obligations stemming from this are a condition for the country remaining in the euro." An anonymous member of PASOK suggested that Papandreou believed that Venizelos was the most appropriate person to head am interim coalition government as "Venizelos is the main negotiator in Europe, so there will be continuity, although New Democracy is fiercely against this proposal." Papandreou also hoped that a new government would be formed by 7 November, before eurozone finance ministers meet in Brussels to discuss the next scheduled bailout fund for Greece. However, according to PASOK, Papandreou would not resign until there was clarification on who would lead the coalition government and that he wanted a new government in the following week. LAOS also added that Samaras should reconsider his position as forming a coalition government has been "achieved with the departure of Papandreou from power."

Finance Minister Evangelos Venizelos added that an interim administration would serve until the end of February, after which a new election would be called following the passage of the 8-billion-euro loan tranche. Papandreou added that "elections at this moment not only equal disaster but could not take place in the best interest of the people. There is one solution. To support the [EU bailout] deal with a multiparty approach, without elections, with a strong government" and that he sought to "immediately create a government of co-operation [because] a lack of consensus would worry our European partners about our country's membership of the eurozone." An unnamed senior member of PASOK said that Papandreou would resign as soon as a new government is formed, possibly on the night of 6 November.

On 6 November, Papandreou and Samaras agreed to the formation of a new coalition government that would not be led by Papandreou following a meeting with Papoulias. Papoulias' office issues a statement that read the leader of the government would be decided by the leaders of the largest parties the following day, but it did no mention the tenure of the government. However, Papandreou said that "it is clear that this government will pass the baton but it will not pass it to a void - it will pass it to a new government, if we agree on it, and I hope this will happen soon. I'm not interested in being prime minister in the new government;" he also added that a new election should not be held before February or March until the bailout legislation is approved by parliament The announcement also followed a European Union deadline before a finance minister meeting on 7 November about the formation of a government and the enactment of a bailout agreement. Papoulias said that "an agreement was reached to form a new government to immediately lead the country to elections after ratifying the decisions taken by the European Council."

Lucas Papademos was suggested as the possible leader of a new government. He later agreed to be the interim prime minister until a future election. At the last minute there was controversy over Papademos amongst both PASOK and New Democracy and a joint announcement for the new PM was put off till 10 November. Samaras blamed PASOK for the delay saying that the constitution demanded that the ruling party had the prerogative to name a candidate for prime minister.

In what Al Jazeera called an "apparent farewell address" Papandreou said on television that: "We have agreed on someone who will unite us. I would like to wish every success to the new prime minister and of course the new government. I will stand by them and I will support them with all my strength."

=== International ===
==== Supranational ====
- EU: President of the European Commission José Manuel Barroso and President of the European Council Herman Van Rompuy have issued a joint statement expressing their faith in the agreement of 27 October 2011 and that the country will honour the agreements it has made with the Eurozone and the world. Joseph Daul, chairman of the European People's Party in the European Parliament, characterised the move to hold a referendum as "verging on a violation of the Maastricht Treaty."
- G20: Though the 2011 G-20 Cannes summit was intended to discuss reforms to the global monetary system and to rein in financial speculation and capital flows, the surprising decision to hold the referendum caused a change to the discussions as the European Financial Stability Facility took precedence over other issues.
- IMF: Christine Lagarde, director of the International Monetary Fund, said that the next installment of the Greek bailout would be decided in December, after the referendum has taken place.

==== National ====
- Canada: Central Bank Governor Mark Carney stressed the importance of Greece seeking democratic support for the proposed economic restructuring.
- France: President Nicolas Sarkozy, said that he was 'appalled' by the move to bring the agreement to a referendum.
- Germany: The Ministry of Finance described the move as an internal development and declined to make a statement.
- Italy: Prime Minister Silvio Berlusconi said the decision to move to a referendum was surprising and having a negative impact on the markets.
- United Kingdom: The Chancellor of the Exchequer George Osborne said "The decision of the Greek prime minister has added to the instability and uncertainty in the Eurozone."
- United States: White House Press Secretary Jay Carney expressed the U.S. government's opinion that the move to put the bailout deal to a referendum shows that Europe needs to implement the agreement rapidly.

== See also ==
- Greek government-debt crisis
