= European Financial Stabilisation Mechanism =

Funding programme of the European Commission

The European Financial Stabilisation Mechanism (EFSM) is an emergency funding programme reliant upon funds raised on the financial markets and guaranteed by the European Commission using the budget of the European Union as collateral. It runs under the supervision of the Commission and aims at preserving financial stability in Europe by providing financial assistance to member states of the European Union in economic difficulty.

The Commission fund, backed by all 27 European Union member states, has the authority to raise up to €60 billion. The EFSM is rated AAA by Fitch, Moody's and Standard & Poor's. The EFSM has been operational since 10 May 2010.

== Programmes ==
=== Irish programme ===
Under the programme agreed between the Eurozone and the government of Ireland, the EFSM wil provide loans of 22.4 billion euros between 2010 and 2013. As of January 2012 the EFSM had provided 15.4 bn. Further funds have also been provided through the EFSF

=== Portuguese programme ===
Under the financial assistance programme agreed between the Eurozone and the government of Portugal, the EFSM provided loans of €24.3 billion to Portugal between 2011 and 2014. Further funds have also been provided through the EFSF and by the International Monetary Fund (IMF).

=== Greece ===
In July 2015 the European Commission proposed to re-activate the EFSM to provide financing for a bridging loan to the government of Greece, in order to meet its immediate commitments including loan repayments to the IMF and ECB. In August, the loan of around €7 billion was fully repaid by Greece.

== Operations ==
=== 2011 inaugural issuance ===
On 5 January 2011, the European Union, under the European Financial Stabilization Mechanism, successfully placed in the capital markets a €5 billion issue of bonds as part of the financial support package agreed for Ireland. The issuance spread was fixed at mid swap plus 12 basis points. This implies borrowing costs for EFSM of 2.59%.

=== Subsequent issuances ===
- €4.75 billion 10 yr bond issued on 24 May 2011
- €4.75 billion 5 yr bond issued on 25 May 2011
- €5.0 billion 10yr bond issued on 14 Sept. 2011
- €4.0 billion 15yr bond issued on 22 Sept. 2011
- €1.1 billion 7yr bond issued on 29 Sept. 2011
- €3.0 billion 30 yr bond issued on 9 Jan. 2012

== Bailout programs for EU members (since 2008) ==
The table below provides an overview of the financial composition of all bailout programs being initiated for EU member states, since the 2008 financial crisis. EU member states outside the eurozone (marked with yellow in the table) have no access to the funds provided by EFSF/ESM, but can be covered with rescue loans from EU's Balance of Payments programme (BoP), IMF and bilateral loans (with an extra possible assistance from the Worldbank/EIB/EBRD if classified as a development country). Since October 2012, the ESM as a permanent new financial stability fund to cover any future potential bailout packages within the eurozone, has effectively replaced the now defunct GLF + EFSM + EFSF funds. Whenever pledged funds in a scheduled bailout program were not transferred in full, the table has noted this by writing "Y out of X".

EU member	Time span	IMF (billion €)	World Bank (billion €)	EIB / EBRD (billion €)	Bilateral (billion €)	BoP (billion €)	GLF (billion €)	EFSM (billion €)	EFSF (billion €)	ESM (billion €)	Bailout in total (billion €)
Cyprus I^{1}	Dec.2011-Dec.2012	–	–	–	2.5	–	–	–	–	–	2.5^{1}
Cyprus II^{2}	May 2013-Mar.2016	1.0	–	–	–	–	–	–	–	6.3 out of 9.0	7.3 out of 10.0^{2}
Greece I+II^{3}	May 2010-Jun.2015	32.1 out of 48.1	–	–	–	–	52.9	–	130.9 out of 144.6	–	215.9 out of 245.6^{3}
Greece III^{4}	Aug.2015-Aug.2018	(proportion of 86, to be decided Oct.2015)	–	–	–	–	–	–	–	(up till 86)	86^{4}
Hungary^{5}	Nov.2008-Oct.2010	9.1 out of 12.5	1.0	–	–	5.5 out of 6.5	–	–	–	–	15.6 out of 20.0^{5}
Ireland^{6}	Nov.2010-Dec.2013	22.5	–	–	4.8	–	–	22.5	18.4	–	68.2^{6}
Latvia^{7}	Dec.2008-Dec.2011	1.1 out of 1.7	0.4	0.1	0.0 out of 2.2	2.9 out of 3.1	–	–	–	–	4.5 out of 7.5^{7}
Portugal^{8}	May 2011-Jun 2014	26.5 out of 27.4	–	–	–	–	–	24.3 out of 25.6	26.0	–	76.8 out of 79.0^{8}
Romania I^{9}	May 2009-Jun 2011	12.6 out of 13.6	1.0	1.0	–	5.0	–	–	–	–	19.6 out of 20.6^{9}
Romania II^{10}	Mar 2011-Jun 2013	0.0 out of 3.6	1.15	–	–	0.0 out of 1.4	–	–	–	–	1.15 out of 6.15^{10}
Romania III^{11}	Oct 2013-Sep 2015	0.0 out of 2.0	2.5	–	–	0.0 out of 2.0	–	–	–	–	2.5 out of 6.5^{11}
Spain^{12}	July 2012-Dec.2013	–	–	–	–	–	–	–	–	41.3 out of 100	41.3 out of 100^{12}
Total payment	Nov.2008-Aug.2018	104.9	6.05	1.1	7.3	13.4	52.9	46.8	175.3	136.3	544.05

1 Cyprus received in late December 2011 a €2.5bn bilateral emergency bailout loan from Russia, to cover its governmental budget deficits and a refinancing of maturing governmental debts until 31 December 2012. Initially the bailout loan was supposed to be fully repaid in 2016, but as part of establishment of the later following second Cypriot bailout programme, Russia accepted a delayed repayment in eight biannual tranches throughout 2018–2021 - while also lowering its requested interest rate from 4.5% to 2.5%.
2 When it became evident Cyprus needed an additional bailout loan to cover the government's fiscal operations throughout 2013–2015, on top of additional funding needs for recapitalization of the Cypriot financial sector, negotiations for such an extra bailout package started with the Troika in June 2012. In December 2012 a preliminary estimate indicated, that the needed overall bailout package should have a size of €17.5bn, comprising €10bn for bank recapitalisation and €6.0bn for refinancing maturing debt plus €1.5bn to cover budget deficits in 2013+2014+2015, which in total would have increased the Cypriot debt-to-GDP ratio to around 140%. The final agreed package however only entailed a €10bn support package, financed partly by IMF (€1bn) and ESM (€9bn), because it was possible to reach a fund saving agreement with the Cypriot authorities, featuring a direct closure of the most troubled Laiki Bank and a forced bail-in recapitalisation plan for Bank of Cyprus.
The final conditions for activation of the bailout package was outlined by the Troika's MoU agreement in April 2013, and include: (1) Recapitalisation of the entire financial sector while accepting a closure of the Laiki bank, (2) Implementation of the anti–money laundering framework in Cypriot financial institutions, (3) Fiscal consolidation to help bring down the Cypriot governmental budget deficit, (4) Structural reforms to restore competitiveness and macroeconomic imbalances, (5) Privatization programme. The Cypriot debt-to-GDP ratio is on this background now forecasted only to peak at 126% in 2015 and subsequently decline to 105% in 2020, and thus considered to remain within sustainable territory. The €10bn bailout comprise €4.1bn spend on debt liabilities (refinancing and amortization), 3.4bn to cover fiscal deficits, and €2.5bn for the bank recapitalization. These amounts will be paid to Cyprus through regular tranches from 13 May 2013 until 31 March 2016. According to the programme this will be sufficient, as Cyprus during the programme period in addition will: Receive €1.0bn extraordinary revenue from privatization of government assets, ensure an automatic roll-over of €1.0bn maturing Treasury Bills and €1.0bn of maturing bonds held by domestic creditors, bring down the funding need for bank recapitalization with €8.7bn — of which 0.4bn is reinjection of future profit earned by the Cyprus Central Bank (injected in advance at the short term by selling its gold reserve) and €8.3bn origin from the bail-in of creditors in Laiki bank and Bank of Cyprus. The forced automatic rollover of maturing bonds held by domestic creditors were conducted in 2013, and equaled according to some credit rating agencies a "selective default" or "restrictive default", mainly because the fixed yields of the new bonds did not reflect the market rates — while maturities at the same time automatically were extended. Cyprus successfully concluded its three-year financial assistance programme at the end of March 2016, having borrowed a total of €6.3 billion from the European Stability Mechanism and €1 billion from the International Monetary Fund. The remaining €2.7 billion of the ESM bailout was never dispensed, due to the Cypriot government's better than expected finances over the course of the programme.
3 Many sources list the first bailout was €110bn followed by the second on €130bn. When you deduct €2.7bn due to Ireland+Portugal+Slovakia opting out as creditors for the first bailout, and add the extra €8.2bn IMF has promised to pay Greece for the years in 2015-16 (through a programme extension implemented in December 2012), the total amount of bailout funds sums up to €245.6bn. The first bailout resulted in a payout of €20.1bn from IMF and €52.9bn from GLF, during the course of May 2010 until December 2011, and then it was technically replaced by a second bailout package for 2012-2016, which had a size of €172.6bn (€28bn from IMF and €144.6bn from EFSF), as it included the remaining committed amounts from the first bailout package. All committed IMF amounts were made available to the Greek government for financing its continued operation of public budget deficits and to refinance maturing public debt held by private creditors and IMF. The payments from EFSF were earmarked to finance €35.6bn of PSI restructured government debt (as part of a deal where private investors in return accepted a nominal haircut, lower interest rates and longer maturities for their remaining principal), €48.2bn for bank recapitalization, €11.3bn for a second PSI debt buy-back, while the remaining €49.5bn were made available to cover continued operation of public budget deficits. The combined programme was scheduled to expire in March 2016, after IMF had extended their programme period with extra loan tranches from January 2015 to March 2016 (as a mean to help Greece service the total sum of interests accruing during the lifespan of already issued IMF loans), while the Eurogroup at the same time opted to conduct their reimbursement and deferral of interests outside their bailout programme framework — with the EFSF programme still being planned to end in December 2014.
Due to the refusal by the Greek government to comply with the agreed conditional terms for receiving a continued flow of bailout transfers, both IMF and the Eurogroup opted to freeze their programmes since August 2014. To avoid a technical expiry, the Eurogroup postponed the expiry date for its frozen programme to 30 June 2015, paving the way within this new deadline for the possibility of transfer terms first to be renegotiated and then finally complied with to ensure completion of the programme. As Greece withdrew unilaterally from the process of settling renegotiated terms and time extension for the completion of the programme, it expired uncompleted on 30 June 2015. Hereby, Greece lost the possibility to extract €13.7bn of remaining funds from the EFSF (€1.0bn unused PSI and Bond Interest facilities, €10.9bn unused bank recapitalization funds and a €1.8bn frozen tranche of macroeconomic support), and also lost the remaining SDR 13.561bn of IMF funds (being equal to €16.0bn as per the SDR exchange rate on 5 Jan 2012), although those lost IMF funds might be recouped if Greece settles an agreement for a new third bailout programme with ESM — and passes the first review of such programme.
4 A new third bailout programme worth €86bn in total, jointly covered by funds from IMF and ESM, will be disbursed in tranches from August 2015 until August 2018. The programme was approved to be negotiated on 17 July 2015, and approved in full detail by the publication of an ESM facility agreement on 19 August 2015. IMF's transfer of the "remainder of its frozen I+II programme" and their new commitment also to contribute with a part of the funds for the third bailout, depends on a successful prior completion of the first review of the new third programme in October 2015. Due to a matter of urgency, EFSM immediately conducted a temporary €7.16bn emergency transfer to Greece on 20 July 2015, which was fully overtaken by ESM when the first tranche of the third program was conducted 20 August 2015. Due to being temporary bridge financing and not part of an official bailout programme, the table do not display this special type of EFSM transfer.
The loans of the program has an average maturity of 32.5 years and carry a variable interest rate (currently at 1%). The program has earmarked transfer of up till €25bn for bank recapitalization purposes (to be used to the extent deemed needed by the annual stress tests of European Banking Supervision), and also include establishment of a new privatization fund to conduct sale of Greek public assets — of which the first generated €25bn will be used for early repayment of the bailout loans earmarked for bank recapitalizations. Potential debt relief for Greece, in the form of longer grace and payment periods, will be considered by the European public creditors after the first review of the new programme, by October/November 2015.
5 Hungary recovered faster than expected, and thus did not receive the remaining €4.4bn bailout support scheduled for October 2009-October 2010. IMF paid in total 7.6 out of 10.5 billion SDR, equal to €9.1bn out of €12.5bn at current exchange rates.
6 In Ireland the National Treasury Management Agency also paid €17.5bn for the program on behalf of the Irish government, of which €10bn were injected by the National Pensions Reserve Fund and the remaining €7.5bn paid by "domestic cash resources", which helped increase the program total to €85bn. As this extra amount by technical terms is an internal bail-in, it has not been added to the bailout total. As of 31 March 2014 all committed funds had been transferred, with EFSF even paying €0.7bn more, so that the total amount of funds had been marginally increased from €67.5bn to €68.2bn.
7 Latvia recovered faster than expected, and thus did not receive the remaining €3.0bn bailout support originally scheduled for 2011.
8 Portugal completed its support programme as scheduled in June 2014, one month later than initially planned due to awaiting a verdict by its constitutional court, but without asking for establishment of any subsequent precautionary credit line facility. By the end of the programme all committed amounts had been transferred, except for the last tranche of €2.6bn (1.7bn from EFSM and 0.9bn from IMF), which the Portuguese government declined to receive. The reason why the IMF transfers still mounted to slightly more than the initially committed €26bn, was due to its payment with SDR's instead of euro — and some favorable developments in the EUR-SDR exchange rate compared to the beginning of the programme. In November 2014, Portugal received its last delayed €0.4bn tranche from EFSM (post programme), hereby bringing its total drawn bailout amount up at €76.8bn out of €79.0bn.
9 Romania recovered faster than expected, and thus did not receive the remaining €1.0bn bailout support originally scheduled for 2011.
10 Romania had a precautionary credit line with €5.0bn available to draw money from if needed, during the period March 2011-June 2013; but entirely avoided to draw on it. During the period, the World Bank however supported with a transfer of €0.4bn as a DPL3 development loan programme and €0.75bn as results based financing for social assistance and health.
11 Romania had a second €4bn precautionary credit line established jointly by IMF and EU, of which IMF accounts for SDR 1.75134bn = €2bn, which is available to draw money from if needed during the period from October 2013 to 30 September 2015. In addition the World Bank also made €1bn available under a Development Policy Loan with a deferred drawdown option valid from January 2013 through December 2015. The World Bank will throughout the period also continue providing earlier committed development programme support of €0.891bn, but this extra transfer is not accounted for as "bailout support" in the third programme due to being "earlier committed amounts". In April 2014, the World Bank increased their support by adding the transfer of a first €0.75bn Fiscal Effectiveness and Growth Development Policy Loan, with the final second FEG-DPL tranch on €0.75bn (worth about $1bn) to be contracted in the first part of 2015. No money had been drawn from the precautionary credit line, as of May 2014.
12 Spain's €100bn support package has been earmarked only for recapitalisation of the financial sector. Initially an EFSF emergency account with €30bn was available, but nothing was drawn, and it was cancelled again in November 2012 after being superseded by the regular ESM recapitalisation programme. The first ESM recapitalisation tranch of €39.47bn was approved 28 November, and transferred to the bank recapitalisation fund of the Spanish government (FROB) on 11 December 2012. A second tranch for "category 2" banks on €1.86n was approved by the Commission on 20 December, and finally transferred by ESM on 5 February 2013. "Category 3" banks were also subject for a possible third tranch in June 2013, in case they failed before then to acquire sufficient additional capital funding from private markets. During January 2013, all "category 3" banks however managed to fully recapitalise through private markets and thus will not be in need for any State aid. The remaining €58.7bn of the initial support package is thus not expected to be activated, but will stay available as a fund with precautionary capital reserves to possibly draw upon if unexpected things happen — until 31 December 2013. In total €41.3bn out of the available €100bn was transferred. Upon the scheduled exit of the programme, no follow-up assistance was requested.

== Repayments ==
=== Portugal ===
The Portuguese government repaid early €2 billion of its EFSM loans in 2022 and 2023. Another early repayment amounting to €2.5 billion took place on 23 December 2025 : following this repayment, €19.8 billion of EFSM loans to Portugal remain outstanding. The Portuguese governement plans further repayments of €2.4 billion in 2026 and €2.6 billion in 2027.

== See also ==
- European Financial Stability Facility
- European Stability Mechanism
- European Fiscal Union
- List of acronyms: European sovereign-debt crisis
- Maiden Lane Transactions
- Term Asset-Backed Securities Loan Facility
- Troubled Assets Relief Program
