= European Financial Stability Facility =

Created to address the European sovereign-debt crisis

The European Financial Stability Facility (EFSF) is a special purpose vehicle financed by members of the eurozone to address the European sovereign-debt crisis. It was agreed by the Council of the European Union (Note: The Council of the European Union then represented 27 member states, since this was before the accession of Croatia.) on 9 May 2010, with the objective of preserving financial stability in Europe by providing financial assistance to eurozone states in economic difficulty. The Facility's headquarters are in Luxembourg City, as are those of the European Stability Mechanism. Treasury management services and administrative support are provided to the Facility by the European Investment Bank through a service level contract. Since the establishment of the European Stability Mechanism, the activities of the EFSF are carried out by the ESM.

The EFSF is authorised to borrow up to €440 billion, of which €250 billion remained available after the Irish and Portuguese bailout. A separate entity, the European Financial Stabilisation Mechanism (EFSM), a programme reliant upon funds raised on the financial markets and guaranteed by the European Commission using the budget of the European Union as collateral, has the authority to raise up to €60 billion.

== Function ==
The mandate of the EFSF is to "safeguard financial stability in Europe by providing financial assistance" to eurozone states.

The EFSF can issue bonds or other debt instruments on the market with the support of the German Finance Agency to raise the funds needed to provide loans to eurozone countries in financial troubles, recapitalise banks or buy sovereign debt. Emissions of bonds would be backed by guarantees given by the euro area member states in proportion to their share in the paid-up capital of the European Central Bank (ECB).

The €440 billion lending capacity of the Facility may be combined with loans up to €60 billion from the European Financial Stabilisation Mechanism (reliant on funds raised by the European Commission using the EU budget as collateral) and up to €250 billion from the International Monetary Fund (IMF) to obtain a financial safety net up to €750 billion.

Had there been no financial operations undertaken, the EFSF would have closed down after three years, on 30 June 2013. However, since the EFSF was activated in 2011 to lend money to Ireland and Portugal, the Facility will exist until its last obligation has been fully repaid.

=== Lending ===
The Facility could only act after a support request is made by a eurozone member state and a country programme has been negotiated with the European Commission and the IMF and after such a programme has been unanimously accepted by the Euro Group (eurozone finance ministers) and a memorandum of understanding is signed. This would only occur when the country is unable to borrow on markets at acceptable rates.

If there was a request from a eurozone member state for financial assistance, it will take three to four weeks to draw up a support programme including sending experts from the commission, the IMF and the ECB to the country in difficulty. Once the Euro Group approved the country programme, the EFSF would need several working days to raise the necessary funds and disburse the loan.

=== Guarantee commitments ===
The table below shows the current maximum level of joint and several guarantees for capital given by the Eurozone countries. The amounts are based on the European Central Bank capital key weightings. The EU requested the eurozone countries to approve an increase of the guarantee amounts to €780 billion. The majority of the risk of the increase from original €440 billion falls on the AAA rated countries and ultimately their taxpayers, in a possible event of default of the investments of EFSF. The guarantee increases were approved by all Eurozone countries by 13 October 2011.

The €110 billion bailout to Greece of 2010 was not part of the EFSF guarantees and is not managed by EFSF, but a separate bilateral commitment by the Eurozone countries (excluding Slovakia, who opted out, and Estonia, which was not in Eurozone in 2010) and IMF.

In addition to the capital guarantees shown in the table, the enlarged EFSF agreement holds the guarantor countries responsible for all interest costs of the issued EFSF bonds, in contrast to the original EFSF structure, significantly expanding the potential taxpayer liabilities. These additional guarantee amounts increase if the coupon payments of the issued EFSF bonds are high. On 29 November 2011, European finance ministers decided that EFSF can guarantee 20 to 30% of the bonds of struggling peripheral economies.

Country	Initial contributions			Enlarged contributions (see enlargement section)	
Country	Guarantee Commitments (EUR) Millions	Percentage	€ per capita	Guarantee Commitments (EUR) Millions	Percentage
Austria	€12,241.43	2.78%	€1,464.86	€21,639.19	2.7750%
Belgium	€15,292.18	3.48%	€1,423.71	€27,031.99	3.4666%
Cyprus	€863.09	0.20%	€1,076.68	€1,525.68	0.1957%
Estonia				€1,994.86	0.2558%
Finland	€7,905.20	1.80%	€1,484.51	€13,974.03	1.7920%
France	€89,657.45	20.38%	€1,398.60	€158,487.53	20.3246%
Germany	€119,390.07	27.13%	€1,454.87	€211,045.90	27.0647%
Greece	€12,387.70	2.82%	€1,099.90	€21,897.74	2.8082%
Ireland	€7,002.40	1.59%	€1,549.97	€12,378.15	1.5874%
Italy	€78,784.72	17.91%	€1,311.10	€139,267.81	17.8598%
Luxembourg	€1,101.39	0.25%	€2,239.95	€1,946.94	0.2497%
Malta	€398.44	0.09%	€965.65	€704.33	0.0903%
Netherlands	€25,143.58	5.71%	€1,525.60	€44,446.32	5.6998%
Portugal	€11,035.38	2.51%	€1,037.96	€19,507.26	2.5016%
Slovakia	€4,371.54	0.99%	€807.89	€7,727.57	0.9910%
Slovenia	€2,072.92	0.47%	€1,009.51	€3,664.30	0.4699%
Spain	€52,352.51	11.90%	€1,141.75	€92,543.56	11.8679%
(European Union) Eurozone (16) without Estonia (°)	€440,000.00	100%	€1,339.02		
(European Union) Eurozone (17) with Estonia				€779,783.14	100%

(° Estonia entered the eurozone on 1 January 2011, i.e. after the creation of the European Financial Stability Facility in 2010). Greece, Ireland and Portugal are "stepping out guarantors", except where they have liabilities before getting that status. Estonia is a stepping out guarantor with respect to liabilities before it joined the eurozone.

=== Management ===
Since December 2022, the chief executive officer of the EFSF is Pierre Gramegna, who is also the managing director of the ESM, and who previously was the minister of finance of the Grand-Duchy of Luxembourg.

Gramegna succeeded Klaus Regling, a former director general of the European Commission's Directorate General for Economic and Financial Affairs, having previously worked at the IMF, the German Ministry of Finance and in the private sector as managing director of the Moore Capital Strategy Group in London.

The board of the European Financial Stability Facility comprise high level representatives of the 17 eurozone member states, including Deputy Ministers or Secretaries of State or Director Generals of the Treasury. The European Commission and the European Central Bank can each appoint an observer to the EFSF Board. Its chairman is Thomas Wieser, who is also chairman of the EU's Economic and Financial Committee.

Although there is no specific statutory requirement for accountability to the European Parliament, the Facility is expected to operate a close relationship with relevant committees within the EU.

== Developments and implementation ==
On 7 June 2010, the eurozone member states entrusted the European Commission, where appropriate in liaison with the European Central Bank, with the task of:

- negotiating and signing on their behalf after their approval the memoranda of understanding related to this support;
- providing proposals to them on the loan facility agreements to be signed with the beneficiary member state(s);
- assessing the fulfilment of the conditionality laid down in the memoranda of understanding;
- providing input, together with the European Investment Bank, to further discussions and decisions in the Euro Group on EFSF related matters and, in a transitional phase, in which the European Financial Stability Facility is not yet fully operational, on building up its administrative and operational capacities.

On the same day the European Financial Stability Facility was established as a limited liability company under Luxembourg law (Société Anonyme), while Klaus Regling was appointed as chief executive officer of the EFSF on 9 June 2010 and took office on 1 July 2010. The Facility became fully operational on 4 August 2010.

On 29 September 2011, the German Bundestag voted 523 to 85 to approve the increase in the EFSF's available funds to €440 billion (Germany's share €211 billion). Mid-October Slovakia became the last country to give approval, though not before parliament speaker Richard Sulík registered strong questions as to how "a poor but rule-abiding euro-zone state must bail out a serial violator with twice the per capita income, and triple the level of the pensions – a country which is in any case irretrievably bankrupt? How can it be that the no-bail clause of the Lisbon treaty has been ripped up?"

=== Granting of EFSF aid to Ireland ===
The Euro Group and the EU's Council of Economics and Finance Ministers decided on 28 November 2010 to grant financial assistance in response to the Irish authorities' request. The financial package was designed to cover financing needs up to €85 billion and would result in the EU providing up to €23 billion through the European Financial Stabilisation Mechanism and the EFSF up to €18 billion over 2011 and 2012.

The first bonds of the European Financial Stability Facility were issued on 25 January 2011. The EFSF placed its inaugural five-year bonds for an amount of €5 billion as part of the EU/IMF financial support package agreed for Ireland. The issuance spread was fixed at mid-swap plus 6 basis points. This implies borrowing costs for EFSF of 2.89%. Investor interest was exceptionally strong, with a record breaking order book of €44.5 billion, i.e. about nine times the supply. Investor demand came from around the world and from all types of institutions. The Facility chose three banks (Citibank, HSBC and Société Générale) to organise the inaugural bonds issue.

=== Granting of EFSF aid to Portugal ===
The second Eurozone country to request and receive aid from EFSF is Portugal. Following the formal request for financial assistance made on 7 April 2011 by the Portuguese authorities, the terms and conditions of the financial assistance package were agreed by the Euro Group and the EU's Council of Economics and Finance Ministers on 17 May 2011. The financial package was designed to cover Portugal's financial needs of up to €78 billion, with the European Union—through the European Financial Stabilisation Mechanism—, and the EFSF each providing up to €26 billion to be disbursed over 3 years. Further support was made available through the IMF for up to €26 billion, as approved by the IMF Executive Board on 20 May 2011.

EFSF was activated for Portuguese lending in June 2011, and issued €5 billion of 10-year bonds on 15 June 2011, and €3 billion on 22 June 2011 through BNP Paribas, Goldman Sachs International and The Royal Bank of Scotland.

=== Enlargement ===
On 21 July 2011, the eurozone leaders agreed to amend the EFSF to enlarge its capital guarantee from €440 billion to €780 billion. The increase expanded the effective lending capacity of the EFSF to €440 billion. This required ratifications by all eurozone parliaments, which were completed on 13 October 2011.

The EFSF enlargement agreement also modified the EFSF structure, removing the cash buffer held by EFSF for any new issues and replacing it with +65% overguarantee by the guaranteeing countries. The increase of 165% to the capital guarantee corresponds to the need to have €440 billion of AAA-rated guarantor countries behind the maximum EFSF issued debt capital (Greece, Ireland, and Portugal do not guarantee new EFSF issues as they are recipients of Euroland support, reducing the total maximum guarantees to €726 billion).

Once the capacity of EFSF to extend new loans to distressed Euroland countries expires in 2013, it and the EFSM will be replaced by the European Stability Mechanism (once it is ratified, see Treaties of the European Union#Eurozone reform). However, the outstanding guarantees given to EFSF bondholders to fund bailouts will survive ESM.

On 27 October 2011 the European Council announced that the member states had reached agreement to further increase the effective capacity of the EFSF to €1 trillion by offering insurance to purchasers of eurozone members' debt. European leaders have also agreed to create one or several funds, possibly placed under IMF supervision. The funds would be seeded with EFSF money and contributions from outside investors.

=== Greek bailout ===
As part of the second bailout for Greece, under a retroactive Collective action clause, 100% of the Greek-jurisdiction bonds were shifted to the EFSF, amounting to €164 billion (€130 billion new package plus €34.4 billion remaining from Greek Loan Facility) throughout 2014.

=== Rating ===
The Facility aimed for ratings agencies to assign a AAA rating to its bonds, which would be eligible for European Central Bank refinancing operations. It achieved this in September 2010 when Fitch, and Standard & Poor's awarded it AAA and Moody's awarded it Aaa, making it easier for it to raise money. The rating outlook was qualified as stable. On 16 January 2012 the Standard and Poors (S&P) lowered its rating on the European Financial Stability Facility to AA+ from AAA; the downgrade followed the 13 January 2012 downgrade of France and eight other euro-zone nations which has sparked worries that EFSF will have further difficulties raising funds. In November 2012, Moody's downgraded it. In May 2020, Scope Ratings – a leading European rating agency – assigned the European Financial Stability Facility a first-time long-term rating of AA+ with a Stable Outlook.

== Controversies ==
The EFSF enlargement process of 2011 proved to be challenging to several Eurozone member states, who objected against assuming sovereign liabilities in potential violation of the Maastricht Treaty of no bailout provisions. On 13 October 2011, Slovakia approved EFSF expansion 2.0 after a failed first approval vote. In exchange, the Slovak government was forced to resign and call new elections.

On 19 October 2011, Helsingin Sanomat reported that the Finnish parliament passed the EFSF guarantee expansion without quantifying the total potential liability to Finland. It turned out that several members of the parliament did not understand that in addition to increasing the capital guarantee from €7.9 billion to €14.0 billion, the Government of Finland would be guaranteeing all of the interest and capital raising costs of EFSF in addition to the issued capital, assuming theoretically uncapped liability. Helsingin Sanomat estimated that in an adverse situation this liability could reach €28.7 billion, adding interest rate of 3.5% for 30-year loans to capital guarantee. For this reason the parliamentary approval process on 28 September 2011 was misleading, and may require a new Government proposal.

== Operations ==
As of January 2012 the EFSF had issued 19bn euro in long-term debt and 3.5bn in short-term debt.

- 25 January 2011 5.0bn euro 5-yr bond
- 15 June 2011 5.0bn euro 10-yr bond
- 22 June 2011 3.0bn euro 5-yr bond
- 7 November 2011 3.0bn euro 10-yr bond
- 13 December 2011 1.9719bn euro 3-month bill
- 5 January 2012 3.0bn euro 3-yr bond
- 17 January 2012 1.501bn euro 6-month bill

== Bailout programs for EU members (since 2008) ==
The table below provides an overview of the financial composition of all bailout programs being initiated for EU member states, since the 2008 financial crisis. EU member states outside the eurozone (marked with yellow in the table) have no access to the funds provided by EFSF/ESM, but can be covered with rescue loans from EU's Balance of Payments programme (BoP), IMF and bilateral loans (with an extra possible assistance from the Worldbank/EIB/EBRD if classified as a development country). Since October 2012, the ESM as a permanent new financial stability fund to cover any future potential bailout packages within the eurozone, has effectively replaced the now defunct GLF + EFSM + EFSF funds. Whenever pledged funds in a scheduled bailout program were not transferred in full, the table has noted this by writing "Y out of X".

EU member	Time span	IMF (billion €)	World Bank (billion €)	EIB / EBRD (billion €)	Bilateral (billion €)	BoP (billion €)	GLF (billion €)	EFSM (billion €)	EFSF (billion €)	ESM (billion €)	Bailout in total (billion €)
Cyprus I^{1}	Dec.2011-Dec.2012	–	–	–	2.5	–	–	–	–	–	2.5^{1}
Cyprus II^{2}	May 2013-Mar.2016	1.0	–	–	–	–	–	–	–	6.3 out of 9.0	7.3 out of 10.0^{2}
Greece I+II^{3}	May 2010-Jun.2015	32.1 out of 48.1	–	–	–	–	52.9	–	130.9 out of 144.6	–	215.9 out of 245.6^{3}
Greece III^{4}	Aug.2015-Aug.2018	(proportion of 86, to be decided Oct.2015)	–	–	–	–	–	–	–	(up till 86)	86^{4}
Hungary^{5}	Nov.2008-Oct.2010	9.1 out of 12.5	1.0	–	–	5.5 out of 6.5	–	–	–	–	15.6 out of 20.0^{5}
Ireland^{6}	Nov.2010-Dec.2013	22.5	–	–	4.8	–	–	22.5	18.4	–	68.2^{6}
Latvia^{7}	Dec.2008-Dec.2011	1.1 out of 1.7	0.4	0.1	0.0 out of 2.2	2.9 out of 3.1	–	–	–	–	4.5 out of 7.5^{7}
Portugal^{8}	May 2011-Jun 2014	26.5 out of 27.4	–	–	–	–	–	24.3 out of 25.6	26.0	–	76.8 out of 79.0^{8}
Romania I^{9}	May 2009-Jun 2011	12.6 out of 13.6	1.0	1.0	–	5.0	–	–	–	–	19.6 out of 20.6^{9}
Romania II^{10}	Mar 2011-Jun 2013	0.0 out of 3.6	1.15	–	–	0.0 out of 1.4	–	–	–	–	1.15 out of 6.15^{10}
Romania III^{11}	Oct 2013-Sep 2015	0.0 out of 2.0	2.5	–	–	0.0 out of 2.0	–	–	–	–	2.5 out of 6.5^{11}
Spain^{12}	July 2012-Dec.2013	–	–	–	–	–	–	–	–	41.3 out of 100	41.3 out of 100^{12}
Total payment	Nov.2008-Aug.2018	104.9	6.05	1.1	7.3	13.4	52.9	46.8	175.3	136.3	544.05

1 Cyprus received in late December 2011 a €2.5bn bilateral emergency bailout loan from Russia, to cover its governmental budget deficits and a refinancing of maturing governmental debts until 31 December 2012. Initially the bailout loan was supposed to be fully repaid in 2016, but as part of establishment of the later following second Cypriot bailout programme, Russia accepted a delayed repayment in eight biannual tranches throughout 2018–2021 - while also lowering its requested interest rate from 4.5% to 2.5%.
2 When it became evident Cyprus needed an additional bailout loan to cover the government's fiscal operations throughout 2013–2015, on top of additional funding needs for recapitalization of the Cypriot financial sector, negotiations for such an extra bailout package started with the Troika in June 2012. In December 2012 a preliminary estimate indicated, that the needed overall bailout package should have a size of €17.5bn, comprising €10bn for bank recapitalisation and €6.0bn for refinancing maturing debt plus €1.5bn to cover budget deficits in 2013+2014+2015, which in total would have increased the Cypriot debt-to-GDP ratio to around 140%. The final agreed package however only entailed a €10bn support package, financed partly by IMF (€1bn) and ESM (€9bn), because it was possible to reach a fund saving agreement with the Cypriot authorities, featuring a direct closure of the most troubled Laiki Bank and a forced bail-in recapitalisation plan for Bank of Cyprus.
The final conditions for activation of the bailout package was outlined by the Troika's MoU agreement in April 2013, and include: (1) Recapitalisation of the entire financial sector while accepting a closure of the Laiki bank, (2) Implementation of the anti–money laundering framework in Cypriot financial institutions, (3) Fiscal consolidation to help bring down the Cypriot governmental budget deficit, (4) Structural reforms to restore competitiveness and macroeconomic imbalances, (5) Privatization programme. The Cypriot debt-to-GDP ratio is on this background now forecasted only to peak at 126% in 2015 and subsequently decline to 105% in 2020, and thus considered to remain within sustainable territory. The €10bn bailout comprise €4.1bn spend on debt liabilities (refinancing and amortization), 3.4bn to cover fiscal deficits, and €2.5bn for the bank recapitalization. These amounts will be paid to Cyprus through regular tranches from 13 May 2013 until 31 March 2016. According to the programme this will be sufficient, as Cyprus during the programme period in addition will: Receive €1.0bn extraordinary revenue from privatization of government assets, ensure an automatic roll-over of €1.0bn maturing Treasury Bills and €1.0bn of maturing bonds held by domestic creditors, bring down the funding need for bank recapitalization with €8.7bn — of which 0.4bn is reinjection of future profit earned by the Cyprus Central Bank (injected in advance at the short term by selling its gold reserve) and €8.3bn origin from the bail-in of creditors in Laiki bank and Bank of Cyprus. The forced automatic rollover of maturing bonds held by domestic creditors were conducted in 2013, and equaled according to some credit rating agencies a "selective default" or "restrictive default", mainly because the fixed yields of the new bonds did not reflect the market rates — while maturities at the same time automatically were extended. Cyprus successfully concluded its three-year financial assistance programme at the end of March 2016, having borrowed a total of €6.3 billion from the European Stability Mechanism and €1 billion from the International Monetary Fund. The remaining €2.7 billion of the ESM bailout was never dispensed, due to the Cypriot government's better than expected finances over the course of the programme.
3 Many sources list the first bailout was €110bn followed by the second on €130bn. When you deduct €2.7bn due to Ireland+Portugal+Slovakia opting out as creditors for the first bailout, and add the extra €8.2bn IMF has promised to pay Greece for the years in 2015-16 (through a programme extension implemented in December 2012), the total amount of bailout funds sums up to €245.6bn. The first bailout resulted in a payout of €20.1bn from IMF and €52.9bn from GLF, during the course of May 2010 until December 2011, and then it was technically replaced by a second bailout package for 2012-2016, which had a size of €172.6bn (€28bn from IMF and €144.6bn from EFSF), as it included the remaining committed amounts from the first bailout package. All committed IMF amounts were made available to the Greek government for financing its continued operation of public budget deficits and to refinance maturing public debt held by private creditors and IMF. The payments from EFSF were earmarked to finance €35.6bn of PSI restructured government debt (as part of a deal where private investors in return accepted a nominal haircut, lower interest rates and longer maturities for their remaining principal), €48.2bn for bank recapitalization, €11.3bn for a second PSI debt buy-back, while the remaining €49.5bn were made available to cover continued operation of public budget deficits. The combined programme was scheduled to expire in March 2016, after IMF had extended their programme period with extra loan tranches from January 2015 to March 2016 (as a mean to help Greece service the total sum of interests accruing during the lifespan of already issued IMF loans), while the Eurogroup at the same time opted to conduct their reimbursement and deferral of interests outside their bailout programme framework — with the EFSF programme still being planned to end in December 2014.
Due to the refusal by the Greek government to comply with the agreed conditional terms for receiving a continued flow of bailout transfers, both IMF and the Eurogroup opted to freeze their programmes since August 2014. To avoid a technical expiry, the Eurogroup postponed the expiry date for its frozen programme to 30 June 2015, paving the way within this new deadline for the possibility of transfer terms first to be renegotiated and then finally complied with to ensure completion of the programme. As Greece withdrew unilaterally from the process of settling renegotiated terms and time extension for the completion of the programme, it expired uncompleted on 30 June 2015. Hereby, Greece lost the possibility to extract €13.7bn of remaining funds from the EFSF (€1.0bn unused PSI and Bond Interest facilities, €10.9bn unused bank recapitalization funds and a €1.8bn frozen tranche of macroeconomic support), and also lost the remaining SDR 13.561bn of IMF funds (being equal to €16.0bn as per the SDR exchange rate on 5 Jan 2012), although those lost IMF funds might be recouped if Greece settles an agreement for a new third bailout programme with ESM — and passes the first review of such programme.
4 A new third bailout programme worth €86bn in total, jointly covered by funds from IMF and ESM, will be disbursed in tranches from August 2015 until August 2018. The programme was approved to be negotiated on 17 July 2015, and approved in full detail by the publication of an ESM facility agreement on 19 August 2015. IMF's transfer of the "remainder of its frozen I+II programme" and their new commitment also to contribute with a part of the funds for the third bailout, depends on a successful prior completion of the first review of the new third programme in October 2015. Due to a matter of urgency, EFSM immediately conducted a temporary €7.16bn emergency transfer to Greece on 20 July 2015, which was fully overtaken by ESM when the first tranche of the third program was conducted 20 August 2015. Due to being temporary bridge financing and not part of an official bailout programme, the table do not display this special type of EFSM transfer.
The loans of the program has an average maturity of 32.5 years and carry a variable interest rate (currently at 1%). The program has earmarked transfer of up till €25bn for bank recapitalization purposes (to be used to the extent deemed needed by the annual stress tests of European Banking Supervision), and also include establishment of a new privatization fund to conduct sale of Greek public assets — of which the first generated €25bn will be used for early repayment of the bailout loans earmarked for bank recapitalizations. Potential debt relief for Greece, in the form of longer grace and payment periods, will be considered by the European public creditors after the first review of the new programme, by October/November 2015.
5 Hungary recovered faster than expected, and thus did not receive the remaining €4.4bn bailout support scheduled for October 2009-October 2010. IMF paid in total 7.6 out of 10.5 billion SDR, equal to €9.1bn out of €12.5bn at current exchange rates.
6 In Ireland the National Treasury Management Agency also paid €17.5bn for the program on behalf of the Irish government, of which €10bn were injected by the National Pensions Reserve Fund and the remaining €7.5bn paid by "domestic cash resources", which helped increase the program total to €85bn. As this extra amount by technical terms is an internal bail-in, it has not been added to the bailout total. As of 31 March 2014 all committed funds had been transferred, with EFSF even paying €0.7bn more, so that the total amount of funds had been marginally increased from €67.5bn to €68.2bn.
7 Latvia recovered faster than expected, and thus did not receive the remaining €3.0bn bailout support originally scheduled for 2011.
8 Portugal completed its support programme as scheduled in June 2014, one month later than initially planned due to awaiting a verdict by its constitutional court, but without asking for establishment of any subsequent precautionary credit line facility. By the end of the programme all committed amounts had been transferred, except for the last tranche of €2.6bn (1.7bn from EFSM and 0.9bn from IMF), which the Portuguese government declined to receive. The reason why the IMF transfers still mounted to slightly more than the initially committed €26bn, was due to its payment with SDR's instead of euro — and some favorable developments in the EUR-SDR exchange rate compared to the beginning of the programme. In November 2014, Portugal received its last delayed €0.4bn tranche from EFSM (post programme), hereby bringing its total drawn bailout amount up at €76.8bn out of €79.0bn.
9 Romania recovered faster than expected, and thus did not receive the remaining €1.0bn bailout support originally scheduled for 2011.
10 Romania had a precautionary credit line with €5.0bn available to draw money from if needed, during the period March 2011-June 2013; but entirely avoided to draw on it. During the period, the World Bank however supported with a transfer of €0.4bn as a DPL3 development loan programme and €0.75bn as results based financing for social assistance and health.
11 Romania had a second €4bn precautionary credit line established jointly by IMF and EU, of which IMF accounts for SDR 1.75134bn = €2bn, which is available to draw money from if needed during the period from October 2013 to 30 September 2015. In addition the World Bank also made €1bn available under a Development Policy Loan with a deferred drawdown option valid from January 2013 through December 2015. The World Bank will throughout the period also continue providing earlier committed development programme support of €0.891bn, but this extra transfer is not accounted for as "bailout support" in the third programme due to being "earlier committed amounts". In April 2014, the World Bank increased their support by adding the transfer of a first €0.75bn Fiscal Effectiveness and Growth Development Policy Loan, with the final second FEG-DPL tranch on €0.75bn (worth about $1bn) to be contracted in the first part of 2015. No money had been drawn from the precautionary credit line, as of May 2014.
12 Spain's €100bn support package has been earmarked only for recapitalisation of the financial sector. Initially an EFSF emergency account with €30bn was available, but nothing was drawn, and it was cancelled again in November 2012 after being superseded by the regular ESM recapitalisation programme. The first ESM recapitalisation tranch of €39.47bn was approved 28 November, and transferred to the bank recapitalisation fund of the Spanish government (FROB) on 11 December 2012. A second tranch for "category 2" banks on €1.86n was approved by the Commission on 20 December, and finally transferred by ESM on 5 February 2013. "Category 3" banks were also subject for a possible third tranch in June 2013, in case they failed before then to acquire sufficient additional capital funding from private markets. During January 2013, all "category 3" banks however managed to fully recapitalise through private markets and thus will not be in need for any State aid. The remaining €58.7bn of the initial support package is thus not expected to be activated, but will stay available as a fund with precautionary capital reserves to possibly draw upon if unexpected things happen — until 31 December 2013. In total €41.3bn out of the available €100bn was transferred. Upon the scheduled exit of the programme, no follow-up assistance was requested.

== See also ==
- 2008 financial crisis
- European Fiscal Compact
- European Stability Mechanism (ESM)
- Greek government-debt crisis
- Maiden Lane Transactions
- Term Asset-Backed Securities Loan Facility
- Troubled Asset Relief Program (TARP)
- List of acronyms: European sovereign-debt crisis
