= List of people associated with the eurozone crisis =

This is a list of people associated with the euro area crisis.

== B ==
- José Barroso: Portuguese former President of the European Commission; formerly Prime Minister of Portugal.
- Silvio Berlusconi: Italian businessman and politician, who served four controversial terms as Prime Minister of Italy, and particularly at the time of the euro area crisis, resigning in November 2011.

== C ==
- David Cameron: former Prime Minister of the United Kingdom (11 May 2010 – 13 July 2016), who initiated the referendum in which the majority of voters chose that the UK should leave the European Union.
- Brian Cowen: Irish politician who served as Taoiseach (prime minister) of Ireland and whose administration coincided with the Irish financial and banking crises. He was also the Minister for Finance in the four years preceding the crisis (2004–2008) when repeated warnings about the property, construction & banking industry were ignored.

== D ==
- Charles Dallara: American managing director of the Institute of International Finance, which has played a prominent role in the euro area crisis.
- Jeroen Dijsselbloem: Dutch politician of the Labour Party and Minister of Finance of The Netherlands; president of the Euro Group since 21 January 2013.
- Mario Draghi: Italian president of the European Central Bank; formerly the governor of the Bank of Italy.

== E ==
- Andrea Enria: Italian chairman of the European Banking Authority, formerly head of bank supervision at the Bank of Italy.

== H ==
- François Hollande: President of the French Republic from May 2012 until May 2017.

== J ==
- Jean-Claude Juncker: Luxembourger politician and President of the European Commission; former Prime Minister of Luxembourg; former president of the Eurogroup (from 2005 until January 2013).

== L ==
- Christine Lagarde: French managing director of the International Monetary Fund; formerly French Minister of Economic Affairs in the government of Dominique de Villepin.
- Enrico Letta: Former Prime Minister of Italy (28 April 2013 – 21 February 2014); professor of probability in economics.
- Brian Lenihan Jnr: Former Irish Minister for Finance (2008–2011) during the Post-2008 Irish economic downturn

== M ==
- Emmanuel Macron: President of the French Republic since May 2017, former investment banker at Rothschild & Cie Banque.
- Brendan McDonagh: managing director of the National Asset Management Agency in the Republic of Ireland. NAMA was created by the Government of Ireland in late 2009, in response to the Irish financial crisis and the deflation of the Irish property bubble.
- Angela Merkel: Chancellor of Germany and Chairwoman of the Christian Democratic Union (CDU).
- Mario Monti: Italian economist and academic, former Prime Minister of Italy and Minister of Economy and Finance; also formerly a European Commissioner.

== P ==
- Lucas Papademos: Greek economist, former Caretaker Prime Minister of Greece, serving from the resignation of George Papandreou in November 2011 and until the June 2012 general election; formerly Governor of the Bank of Greece and Vice President of the European Central Bank.
- George Papandreou: Greek politician who served as Prime Minister of Greece during the outbreak of the Greek government-debt crisis.
- George Papaconstantinou: Greek economist and politician, who served as Minister of Finance during the outbreak of the crisis and signed the first EU/IMF bailout for Greece.

== R ==
- Klaus Regling: German economist and the current chief executive officer of the European Financial Stability Facility (EFSF).
- Olli Rehn: Finnish politician, currently serving as European Commissioner for Economic and Financial Affairs, after serving as Commissioner for Enlargement.
- Matteo Renzi: Prime Minister of Italy since 22 February 2014.
- Herman Van Rompuy: Belgian politician of the Christian Democratic and Flemish party; former President of the European Council.
- Mariano Rajoy: Prime Minister of Spain since 2011.

== S ==
- Antonis Samaras: Greek economist and politician; former Prime Minister of Greece (20 June 2012 – 25 January 2015).
- Nicolas Sarkozy: French politician who served as President of the French Republic during the euro area crisis and until May 2012.
- Wolfgang Schäuble: German politician of the Christian Democratic Union (CDU), current president of the Federal Parliament and former Minister of Finance in the Angela Merkel government (October 2009–24 October 2017).

== T ==
- Jean-Claude Trichet: French banker who served as president of the European Central Bank during the euro area crisis.
- Euclid Tsakalotos: Greece's Minister of Finance from 23 September 2015 until 9 July 2019.
- Alexis Tsipras: Prime Minister of Greece from 26 January 2015 until 8 July 2019.
- Donald Tusk: Polish politician; President of the European Council since 1 December 2014.

== V ==
- Yanis Varoufakis: economist, author, blogger, and former Greek Minister of Finance for the period 27/1–6/7/2015. Founder of the Democracy in Europe Movement 2025 (DiEM 2025) in 2016.

== See also ==
- List of acronyms associated with the eurozone crisis
