= João Leão =

Portuguese economist, university professor, and politician (born 1974)

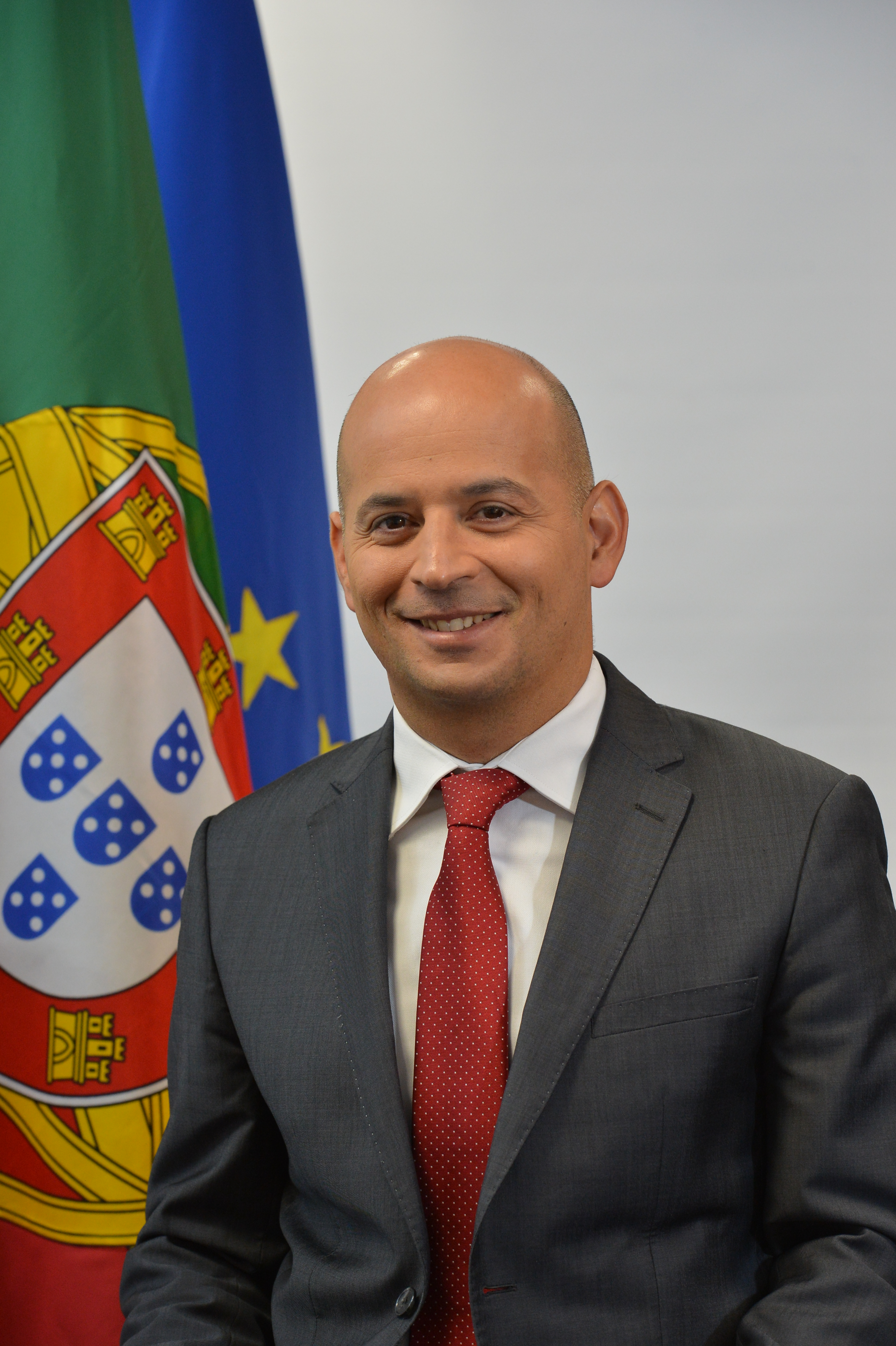

Minister of Finance
- In office 15 June 2020 – 30 March 2022
- Prime Minister: António Costa
- Preceded by: Mário Centeno
- Succeeded by: Fernando Medina

Secretary of State for the Budget
- In office 26 November 2015 – 15 June 2020
- Prime Minister: António Costa
- Preceded by: Hélder Gomes dos Reis
- Succeeded by: Cláudia Joaquim

Personal details
- Born: João Rodrigo Reis Carvalho Leão; 15 February 1974 (age 52) Lisbon, Portugal
- Party: Socialist
- Education: NOVA University Lisbon (BS); Massachusetts Institute of Technology (MS, PhD)

João Rodrigo Reis Carvalho Leão (born 15 February 1974) is a Portuguese economist, university professor, and politician. He served as Minister of Finance in the government of Prime Minister António Costa of Portugal, sworn in on 15 June 2020.

== Early life and education ==
Leão was born in Lisbon in 1974. He completed his BSc degree in economics in Nova School of Economics. Later, he went on to obtain a PhD in economics at the Massachusetts Institute of Technology (MIT) in 2008. His PhD thesis advisor was Abhijit Banerjee, Nobel Prize in Economics.

== Career ==
In 2024 Leão was appointed by the Council of the European Union as the Portuguese Member of the European Court of the Auditors, after a hearing and the endorsement of the European Parliament.

He was Minister of State and Finance between 2020 and 2022.

In 2021 he was elected President of the Board of Governors European Bank for Reconstruction and Development.

Leão chaired the meetings of the Economic and Financial Affairs Council (ECOFIN) when Portugal held the rotating presidency of the European Council in the first semester of 2021.

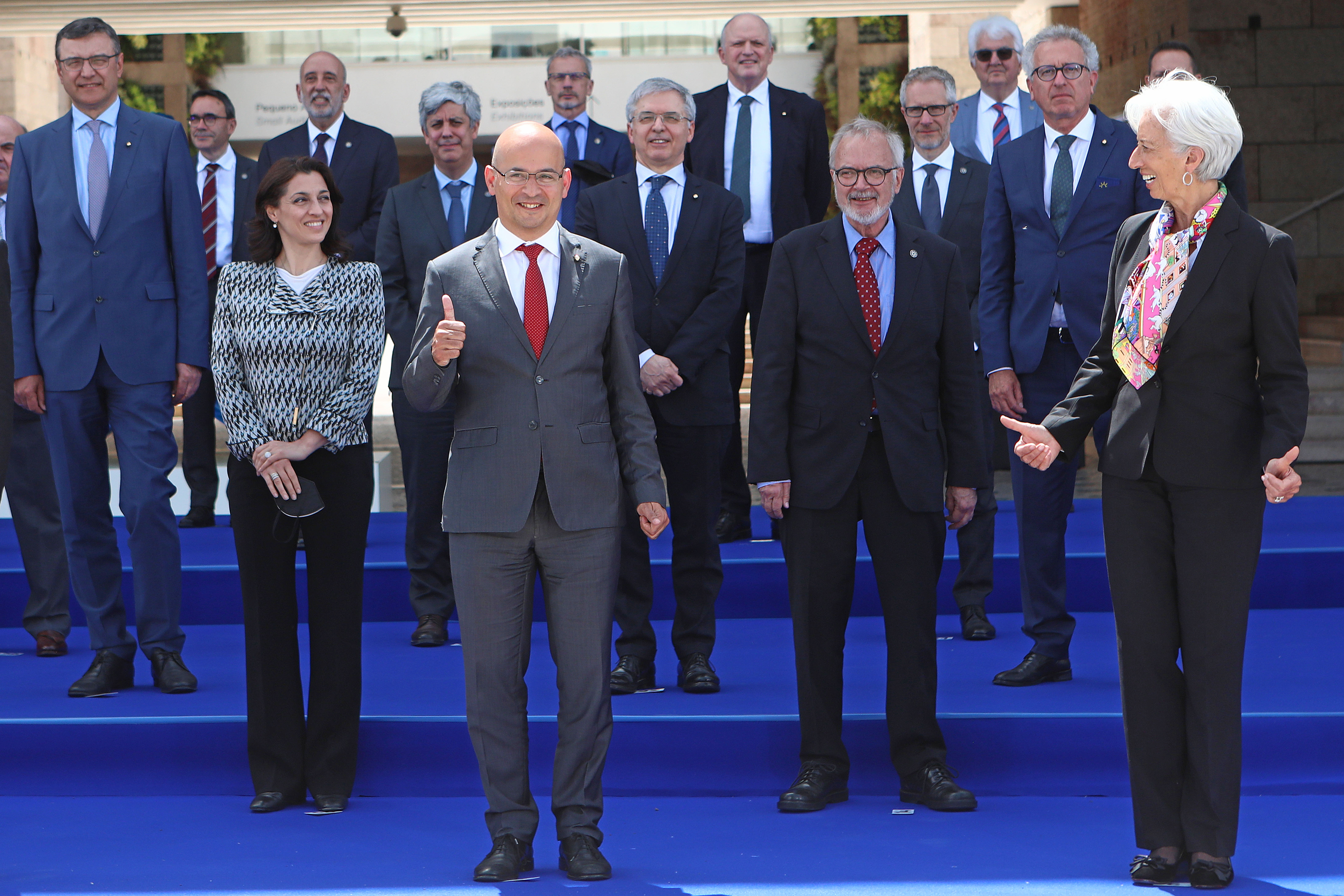
Leão Chairing an Ecofin Meeting in 2021. With Christine Lagarde and other EU Finance Ministers

Leão previously served as Secretary of State for the Budget from 2015 until 2020.

He was Director-General of Research Office of the Ministry of Economy from 2010 to 2014.

In the government led by Pedro Passos Coelho, Leão was a member of the Economic and Social Council, working in the Ministry of the Economy and serving as a delegate to the OECD.

As Minister of Finance, Leão oversaw the government's overhaul plan for ailing TAP Air Portugal amid the COVID-19 pandemic, proposing 2,000 job cuts by 2022, pay cuts of up to 25% and 2 billion euros ($2.46 billion) in extra funds with state guarantees to cover financing needs until 2024.

While Leão was at Ministry of Finance, Portugal achieved in 2019 the first budget surplus of the 45 years of the country's democratic history. During this period, between 2015 and 2022, Portugal was the second country in the EU that the decreased the most its budget deficit from 4,4% to 0,3% and the third country that decreased the most its public debt.

After the peak of the pandemic in 2021, While Leão was Minister of Finance, Portugal was also among the first group of Euro area countries to reach a budget deficit below the European limit of 3%. Portugal's fiscal deficit fell from 5,8% in 2020 to 0.3% of GDP in 2022, significantly better than the budget deficit in the eurozone of 3.6% of GDP. Meanwhile, the decline in Portugal's debt ratio was the third largest in the eurozone between 2020 and 2022. Debt-to-GDP fell 21 p.p. in those 2 years, compared with an average decline of 5.6 p.p. in the eurozone.

In 2022, Leão became Portugal’s nominee to succeed Klaus Regling as Managing Director of the European Stability Mechanism; his candidacy was later endorsed by the French government and later achieved the majority of the weighted votes in the July 2022 meeting of Board of Governors of the ESM. The nomination process narrowed to Leão and Pierre Gramegna, but both pulled out in September 2022 having failed to secure the votes required.

== Other activities ==
European Union organizations

- European Investment Bank (EIB), Ex-Officio Member of the Board of Governors (2020–2022)
- European Stability Mechanism (ESM), Member of the Board of Governors (2020–2022)

International organizations

- Chair of the Board of Governors of the European Bank for Reconstruction and Development 2021-2022
- African Development Bank (AfDB), Ex-Officio Member of the Board of Governors (2020–2022)
- Asian Development Bank (ADB), Ex-Officio Member of the Board of Governors (2020–2022)
- Asian Infrastructure Investment Bank (AIIB), Ex-Officio Member of the Board of Governors (2020–2022)
- European Bank for Reconstruction and Development (EBRD), Ex-Officio Member of the Board of Governors (2020–2022)
- Inter-American Investment Corporation (IIC), Ex-Officio Member of the Board of Governors (2020–2022)
- Multilateral Investment Guarantee Agency (MIGA), World Bank Group, Ex-Officio Member of the Board of Governors (2020–2022)
- World Bank, Ex-Officio Member of the Board of Governors (2020–2022)

Political offices
Preceded by Mário Centeno	Minister of Finance; 2020–2022	Succeeded by Fernando Medina
