= Dimitris Paraskevas =

Greek lawyer

Dimitris Paraskevas is a Supreme Court (Note: A Supreme Court Attorney in Greece is an attorney who has simply marked four years as an Appeals Court attorney. The latter title, in turn, is obtained after marking four years as attorney of the Court of First Instance, a position obtained by any lawyer who has passed the Bar's examination. Importantly, only time marked in each rank is required, without the need to have worked in it. See Social Security citation) attorney in Athens, Greece, specializing in international M&A and privatisations. Previously, he held the position of Secretary for Privatisation of the Hellenic Republic. He is the son of Elias Paraskevas, a former Vice President of the Athens Bar Association, who is recognised as having shaped the case law of the Supreme Court and the Council of State in Greece for over 45 years.

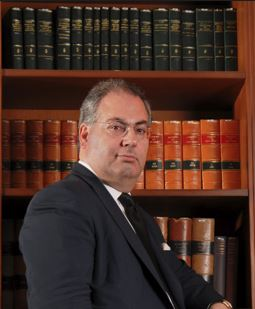
Dimitris Paraskevas

== Career ==
In early 1993, Paraskevas was appointed Special Secretary for Privatisation at the Ministry of Industry, Energy and Technology. During his tenure as Secretary for Privatisation, the Greek Privatisation Programme raised approx. $10bn in proceeds in six years (1993–1999), approximately eight times the proceeds they raised from 1977 to 1992. For this achievement the Financial Times named Paraskevas 'Super Salesman' and praised him for his 'unflappable' style of closing deals.

Paraskevas is currently the Managing Partner of Elias Paraskevas Attorneys 1933, an international law firm with offices in Athens and London, and the Président Délégué of the firm's Monaco consulting arm, Paraskevas S.A.M. In 2014 he was appointed European Forum Liaison Officer of the Banking Law Committee of the International Bar Association, and in January 2016 he was promoted to Treasurer of the Banking Law Committee.

He is consistently named one of the international leaders in worldwide M&A law by the International Who's Who of Business Lawyers (2005–2015) and the Legal Media Group Guide to the World's Leading M&A Lawyers (2007–2015). The Legal 500 Guide (2015) referred to him as 'a legal genius with extremely advanced business and legal sense'.

== Personal life ==
Paraskevas established the Elias Paraskevas Foundation. His donations through this foundation include the Elias Paraskevas floor at the new academic building of the London School of Economics, which was inaugurated by Queen Elizabeth II.

He is also a keen collector of modern artworks by Greek sculptors and painters. The 'Paraskevas Collection' is considered unique and is often quoted in art scholarship discussing modern sculpture in Greece.

He often speaks at international conferences. In June 2010, at the eve of the Greek government debt crisis, in an IIF event in Vienna, Austria, Paraskevas stated publicly to George Papandreou, then Prime Minister of Greece, in front of an audience of 400 bankers, lawyers and regulators, that most members of the audience did not expect the Greek government to pay off its debt. In response, Papandreou affirmed that Greece would pay off its debt; however, the Greek PSI proved Papandreou wrong 18 months later.
