= Frank Schäffler =

German politician (born 1968)

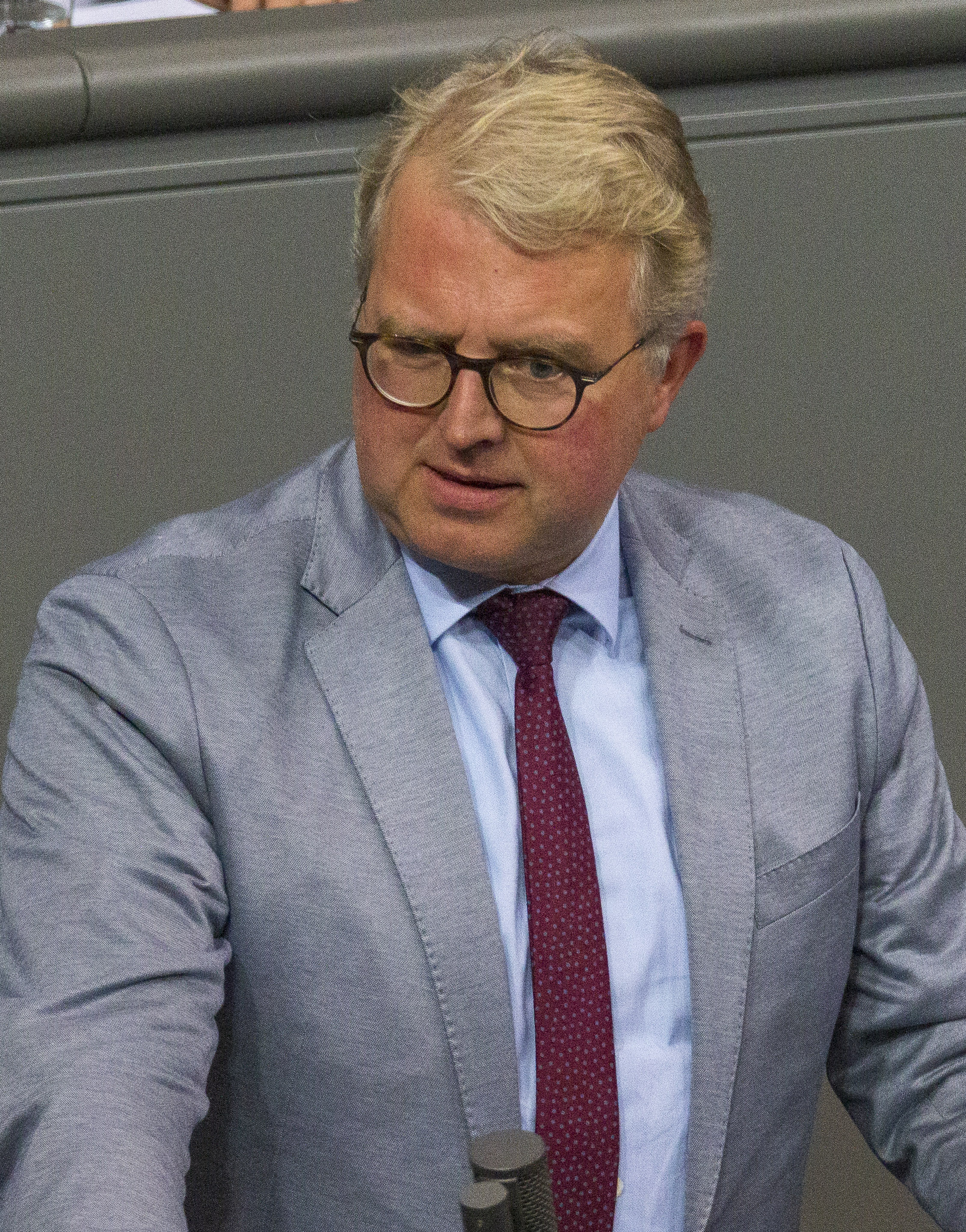
Frank Schäffler

Frank Schäffler (born 22 December 1968) is a German politician of the Free Democratic Party (FDP) who has served as a member of the Bundestag from 2005 to 2013 and again from 2017 to 2025.

== Early life and career ==
Schäffler was born 1968 in the German town of Schwäbisch Gmünd and studied business administration at the Bielefeld University of Applied Sciences. He later worked as an insurance salesman.

== Political career ==
Schäffler entered the liberal FDP in 1987 and first served as a member of the Bundestag from 2005 until 2013. During that time, he was a member of the Finance Committee.

In 2011, Schäffler led a group of fellow eurosceptic MPs from the FDP who collected enough signatures to force a non-binding inner-party referendum on the question of whether the party should oppose the creation of the €500 billion European Stability Mechanism and instead take a much tougher line opposing bail-outs for debt-strapped members of the eurozone. The referendum was widely seen as destabilizing the coalition government under the leadership of Chancellor Angela Merkel amid the European debt crisis. In the run-up to the vote, he became the target of attacks from the party's leadership, including from foreign minister Guido Westerwelle and FDP Secretary General Christian Lindner, who described Schäffler as "Germany's David Cameron"; Lindner subsequently resigned from his position. In 2012, Schäffler co-founded the Alliance Against the ESM.

In 2014, Schäffler co-founded Prometheus — Das Freiheitsinstitut, a member of the Atlas Network.

In the 2017 elections, Schäffler was re-elected and joined the parliament again. In parliament, he first served on the Finance Committee again from 2018 until 2021 before moving to the Budget Committee and the Committee on Digitization. In addition to his committee assignments, he was a deputy chairman of the German-Swiss Parliamentary Friendship Group.

In the negotiations to form a so-called traffic light coalition of the Social Democratic Party (SPD), the Green Party and the FDP following the 2021 federal elections, Schäffler was part of his party's delegation in the working group on European affairs, co-chaired by Udo Bullmann, Franziska Brantner and Nicola Beer.

In 2023, Schäffler announced his candidacy to challenge Lukas Köhler as deputy chair of the FDP parliamentary group; in an internal vote, however, he ultimately lost against Köhler.

== Other activities ==
=== Corporate boards ===
- KfW, Member of the Board of Supervisory Directors (since 2022)
- Bitcoin Group SE, Member of the Supervisory Board (-2018)

=== Non-profit organizations ===
- Nuclear Waste Disposal Fund (KENFO), Member of the Board of Trustees (since 2022)
- Federal Financial Supervisory Authority (BaFin), Member of the Administrative Council (since 2018)
- Federation of German Consumer Organisations (VZBV), Member of the Advisory Board on Financial Markets
- Friedrich August von Hayek Foundation, Member

== Political positions ==
Schäffler is considered to be a libertarian, he rejects the label and consideres himself to be a classical liberal. He denies the scientific consensus on climate change.
