= European Stability Mechanism =

Intergovernmental financial organization

- ESM headquarters in Luxembourg City

- ESM member states Other EU member states
- Formation: 27 September 2012
- Type: IGO
- Legal status: Treaty Establishing the European Stability Mechanism
- Headquarters: Luxembourg City, Luxembourg; 49.63529°N 6.1684°E
- Members: 21 (all Member States of the eurozone)
- Managing Director: Pierre Gramegna
- President of the Board of Governors: Kyriakos Pierrakakis
- Organs: Board of Governors; Board of Directors
- Staff: 230 (2024)
- Website: esm.europa.eu

The European Stability Mechanism (ESM) is an intergovernmental organization located in Luxembourg City, which operates under public international law for all eurozone member states having ratified a special ESM intergovernmental treaty. It was established on 27 September 2012 as a permanent firewall for the eurozone, to safeguard and provide instant access to financial assistance programmes for member states of the eurozone in financial difficulty, with a maximum lending capacity of €500 billion. It has replaced two earlier temporary EU funding programmes: the European Financial Stability Facility (EFSF) and the European Financial Stabilisation Mechanism (EFSM).

== Overview ==
The Treaty Establishing the European Stability Mechanism stipulated that the organization would be established if member states representing 90% of its capital requirements ratified the founding treaty. This threshold was surpassed with Germany's completion of the ratification process on 27 September 2012, which brought the treaty into force on that date for sixteen of the seventeen members of the eurozone. The remaining state, Estonia, which had only committed 0.19% of the capital, completed its ratification on 4 October 2012. A separate treaty, amending Article 136 of the Treaty on the Functioning of the European Union (TFEU) to authorize the establishment of the ESM under EU law, was planned to enter into force on 1 January 2013. However, the last of the then-27 European Union member states to complete their ratification of this amendment, the Czech Republic, did not do so until 23 April 2013, postponing its entry into force until 1 May 2013.

The ESM commenced its operations after an inaugural meeting on 8 October 2012. The first 40% of the paid-in capital was transferred by all ESM member states ahead of a treaty regulated deadline of 12 October 2012. ESM member states can apply for a bailout if they are in financial difficulty or their financial sector is a stability threat in need of recapitalization. ESM bailouts are conditional on member states first signing a memorandum of understanding, outlining a programme for the needed reforms or fiscal consolidation to be implemented in order to restore the financial stability. Another precondition for receiving an ESM bailout is that the member state must have ratified the European Fiscal Compact. When applying for ESM support, the country in concern is analyzed and evaluated on all relevant financial stability matters by the so-called Troika (European Commission, ECB and IMF) in order to decide which of its five different kinds of support programmes should be offered.

As of April 2013, the ESM has approved two Financial Assistance Facility Agreement (FAFA) programmes, with up to €100bn earmarked for recapitalization of Spanish Banks, and €9bn in disbursements for Cyprus for a sovereign state bailout programme. The Cyprus bank recapitalization was funded by converting bank deposits into equity.

== History ==
Following the European sovereign debt crisis that resulted in the lending of money to EU states, there has been a drive to reform the functioning of the eurozone in the event of a crisis. This led to the creation, amongst other things, of a loan mechanism: the European Financial Stability Facility (EFSF) and the European Financial Stability Mechanism (EFSM). These, together with the International Monetary Fund, would lend money to EU states in trouble, in the same way that the European Central Bank can lend money to European banks. However, the EFSF and EFSM were intended only as a temporary measure (to expire in 2013), in part due to the lack of a legal basis in the EU treaties.

In order to resolve the issue, the German government felt a treaty amendment would be required. After the difficult ratification of the Treaty of Lisbon, many states and statesmen opposed reopening treaty amendment and the British government opposes changes affecting the United Kingdom. However, after winning the support of French President Nicolas Sarkozy Germany won support from the European Council in October 2010 for a new treaty. It would be a minimal amendment to strengthen sanctions and create a permanent lending-out mechanism. It would not fulfil the German demand to have the removal of voting rights as a sanction as that would require deeper treaty amendment. The treaty would be designed so there would be no need for referendums, providing the basis for a speedy ratification process, with the aim to have it completely ratified and come into force in July 2012. In that case, it was to co-exist with the temporary lending-out mechanism (EFSF) for one year, as EFSF was set only to expire as a rescue facility at 1 July 2013.

== Treaty basis ==
=== Article 136 amendment of TFEU ===
On 16 December 2010 the European Council agreed a two line amendment to Article 136 of the Treaty on the Functioning of the European Union (TFEU), that would give the ESM legal legitimacy and was designed to avoid any referendums. The amendment simply changes the EU treaties to allow for a permanent mechanism to be established. In March of the following year leaders also agreed to a separate eurozone-only treaty that would create the ESM itself.

In March 2011, the European Parliament approved the treaty amendment after receiving assurances that the European Commission, rather than EU states, would play 'a central role' in running the ESM, despite wishing it had been more involved earlier, and it was signed by all 27 EU member states on 25 March 2011. The amendment reads:

The member states whose currency is the euro may establish a stability mechanism to be activated if indispensable to safeguard the stability of the euro area as a whole. The granting of any required financial assistance under the mechanism will be made subject to strict conditionality.

The amendment authorises the eurozone countries to establish a stability mechanism to protect the common currency, within EU law. This means, that the existing intergovernmental treaty having established ESM outside of the EU framework with entry into force 27 September 2012, might subsequently be transposed to become part of the EU framework once this TFEU article 136 amendment enters into force. The ESM established by the intergovernmental treaty was designed to be fully compatible with existing EU law, and the European Court of Justice ruled in November 2012 - that "the right of a Member State to conclude and ratify the ESM Treaty is not subject to the entry into force" of the TFEU amendment. The TFEU amendment came into force on 1 May 2013, after the Czech Republic became the last member state to ratify the agreement according to its respective constitutional requirements.

=== Treaty Establishing the European Stability Mechanism ===
In addition to the "TFEU amendment" treaty, the European Stability Mechanism itself was established by a treaty among the eurozone states, named the Treaty Establishing the European Stability Mechanism, which sets out the details of how the ESM would operate. Formally, two treaties with this name were signed: one on 11 July 2011 and one on 2 February 2012, after the first turned out not to be substantial enough the second version was produced to "make it more effective". The 2012 version was signed by all 17 Eurozone members on 2 February 2012, and was planned to be ratified and enter force by mid-2012, when the EFSF and EFSM were set to expire. The treaty was concluded exclusively by eurozone states, amongst others because the UK refused to participate in any fiscal integration.

The Treaty establishing the ESM entered into force on 27 September 2012 for 16 signatories. Estonia completed their ratification on 3 October 2012, six days after the treaty entered into force. However, the inaugural meeting of the ESM did not occur until 8 October, after the treaty's entry into force for Estonia. Latvia's adoption of the euro on 1 January 2014 was given final approval by the Economic and Financial Affairs Council on 9 July, making them eligible to apply for ESM membership. Following Latvia's government giving their consent to joining to the ESM in November 2013, it acceded on 21 February 2014. The treaty entered into force for them on 13 March 2014. Latvia's contribution to the ESM will be €325 million. Lithuania adopted the euro on 1 January 2015, and acceded to the ESM on 14 January 2015, becoming a member on 3 February 2015. Croatia adopted the euro on 1 January 2023, acceded to the ESM on 2 March 2023 and became a member on 22 March 2023 when the Treaty entered into force for it. Bulgaria adopted the euro on 1 January 2026, acceded to the ESM on 9 June 2026 and became a member on 29 June 2026.

=== ESM's response to the COVID-19 pandemic crisis ===
To support member states hit by the COVID-19 pandemic, the European Council suspended fiscal rules – including the ESM - applying the general escape clause of the Stability and Growth Pact on 23 March 2020 and agreed to a massive recovery fund of €750 billion, branded Next Generation EU (NGEU), on 23 July 2020. The ESM for its part offered loans of €240 billion in May 2020. But no country accepted the loan. The NGEU fund is about investment to meet the COVID-19-caused economic downturn the reputation of the ESM is about bailing out private banks increasing public debt and thus causing disinvestment.

=== ESM Treaty Reform (since 2020) ===
In June 2015, an updated EMU reform plan was released which envisaged that in the medium-term (between July 2017 and 2025) the ESM should be transposed from being an intergovernmental agreement to become fully integrated into the EU law framework applying to all eurozone member states under the competence provided for by the amended article 136 of the TFEU by 2025. Proposals by the European Commission to create a European Monetary Fund to replace the ESM were published in December 2017.

After reluctance to incorporate the ESM into EU law, on 30 November 2020 the finance ministers at the Eurogroup agreed to amend the treaties establishing the format of the ESM and Single Resolution Fund, to be ratified by all Eurozone member states. The reform proposal was blocked for months because of the veto of the Italian government. The proposed amendments include:

- The establishment of the ESM as a "backstop" to the Single Resolution Fund (SRF), through a revolving credit line.
- Reform of the ESM Governance
- Mandatory introduction of single-limb collective action clauses (CACs) in new euro area sovereign bonds issued
- Changes of eligibility criteria to the precautionary financial assistance instruments
- Clarifications and expansions of the ESM mandate on economic governance;

The amendments to the ESM Treaty were signed on 27 January 2021 by all Eurozone Member States and their ratification by Member States' parliaments is ongoing. By mid-2023, all eurozone members except Italy have ratified the agreement amending the ESM Treaty. In December 2023, the lower house of the Italian parliament voted against the ratification of the amendments to the ESM Treaty, thus suspending the finalization of the ESM Treaty reform.

== Organization ==
The ESM is an intergovernmental organization established under public international law, and located in Luxembourg City. It has about 145 personnel, who are also responsible for the EFSF. The organization is led by a managing director appointed for a five-year term. The first managing director Klaus Regling was appointed in 2012.

Each member state appoints a governor (and alternate) for the board of governors, which can either be chaired by the President of the Euro Group or by a separate elected chair from amongst the governors themselves. In 2012, Jean-Claude Juncker (Luxembourg) was appointed to this position. The board consists of Ministers of Finance of the member states. The Board of Directors consists of 20 members "of high competence in economic and financial matters". Each member state appoints one Director and an alternate.

=== Financial support instruments ===
ESM member states can apply for an ESM bailout if they are in financial difficulty or their financial sector is a stability threat in need of recapitalization. ESM bailouts are conditional on member states first signing a memorandum of understanding (MoU), outlining a programme for the needed reforms or fiscal consolidation to be implemented in order to restore the financial stability. Another precondition for receiving an ESM bailout, starting from 1 March 2013, will be that the member state must have fully ratified the European Fiscal Compact. When applying for ESM support, the country in concern will be analyzed and evaluated on all relevant financial stability matters by the so-called Troika (European Commission, ECB and IMF) in order to decide if one/several of these five different kind of support programmes should be offered:

1. Stability support loan within a macro-economic adjustment programme (Sovereign Bailout Loan):
  "To be granted if it is no longer sustainable for the state to draw on capital markets, when seeking to cover the state's financial needs. The signed conditional MoU agreement will focus on requirements for fiscal consolidation and structural reforms to improve the sovereign financial stability."
2. Bank recapitalisation programme:
  "To be granted if the roots of a crisis situation are primarily located in the financial sector and not directly related to fiscal or structural policies at the state level, with the government seeking to finance a recapitalisation at sustainable borrowing costs. ESM will only offer a bank recapitalisation support package, if it can be established that neither the private market nor the member state will be able to conduct the needed recapitalisation on their own, without causing increased financial stress/instability. The size of the needed recapitalisation shall be determined by a stress test, calculating the amount needed for a complete financial sector repair to eliminate all vulnerabilities. Support from this ESM package is earmarked for bank recapitalisation, and cannot be used for any other purpose. The signed conditional MoU agreement will likewise only cover requirements for reform/changes to the financial sector, within the domains of financial supervision, corporate governance and domestic laws relating to restructuring/resolution."
3. Precautionary financial assistance (PCCL/ECCL):
  "Comprise support in the form of setting up available "credit lines" the ESM member state can draw on if suddenly needed. This support shall be offered to ESM members whose economic conditions are currently sound enough to maintain continuous access to market financing, but being in a fragile situation calling for the setup of an adequate safety-net (financial guarantee), to help ensure a continued access to market financing. The signed conditional MoU agreement will focus on requirements for fiscal consolidation and structural reforms to improve the sovereign financial stability."
4. Primary Market Support Facility (PMSF):
  "Bond purchase operations in the primary market could be made by ESM, in complement to offering regular loans under a macro-economic adjustment programme or to drawdown of funds under a precautionary programme. This instrument would be used primarily towards the end of an adjustment programme to facilitate a country’s return to draw on the market, and reduce the risk of a failed bond auction. The aim is for the private market to subscribe to 50% of the bond auction while ESM cover the remaining 50%. If the participation of the private market proves to be insignificant the PMSF will be cancelled, and replaced by an extra transfer of funds from the macro-economic/precautionary programme. There will be no additional MoU agreement for this support package, as the conditions will be identical to the pre-existing Sovereign bailout loan / Precautionary programme."
5. Secondary Market Support Facility (SMSF):
  "This facility aims to support the good functioning of the government debt markets of ESM Members in exceptional circumstances where the lack of market liquidity threatens financial stability, with a risk of pushing sovereign interest rates towards unsustainable levels and creating refinancing problems for the banking system of the ESM Member concerned. An ESM secondary market intervention is intended to enable market-making that would ensure some debt market liquidity and incentivise investors to further participate in the financing of ESM Members. The instrument can be offered either as a stand alone support, or in combination with support from any of the other 4 instruments. No additional MoU agreement will be needed for ESM members already receiving a Sovereign bailout loan/Precautionary programme; but a non-programme country (being sound in regards of financial stability; except for the liquidity issue), will obviously need to sign a MoU agreement with the policy conditions outlined by the European Commission in liaison with the ECB."

In order to further help increase the financial stability of the eurozone, the ECB decided on 6 September 2012 to automatically run a free unlimited amount of yield-lowering bond purchases (OMT support programme) for all eurozone countries involved in a sovereign state bailout or precautionary programme from EFSF/ESM, if -and for as long as- the country is found to suffer from stressed bond yields at excessive levels; but only at the point of time where the country possesses/regain a complete market funding access -and only if the country still complies with all terms in the signed MoU-agreement. Countries receiving a precautionary programme rather than a sovereign bailout, will per definition have complete market access and thus qualify for OMT support if also suffering from stressed interest rates on its government bonds. In regards to countries receiving a sovereign bailout (Ireland, Portugal and Greece), they will on the other hand not qualify for OMT support before they have regained complete market access, which the ECB define as the moment when the state succeeds to issue a new ten-year government bond series at the private capital market.

Initially, EFSF and ESM were only allowed to offer financial stability loans directly to sovereign states, meaning that offered bank recapitalisation packages were first paid to the state and then transferred to the suffering financial sector; and thus these types of loans were accounted for as national debt of the sovereign state - adversely impacting its gross debt-to-GDP ratio and credit rating. For example, this regime was utilized when ESM established a bank recapitalization support programme for Spain in 2012–13.

On the EU summit on 19 October 2012, it was decided that ESM bank recapitalisation packages in the future (starting from the inception of European Banking Supervision on 4 November 2014), instead only shall by paid directly to the financial sector, so that it no longer counts as state debt in the statistics. ESM made the decided "direct bank recapitalization" framework operational starting from December 2014, as a new novel ultimate backstop instrument to apply for systemic banks in their recovery/resolution phase, if such banks will be found in need to receive additional recapitalization funds after conducted bail-in by private creditors and regulated payment by the Single Resolution Fund. In this way, the primary backstop to patch future uncovered recapitalization needs of a failing systemic bank will be provided by bail-in of private creditors along with contributions from the Single Resolution Fund (as regulated by the Bank Recovery and Resolution Directive), while the ESM "direct bank recapitalization" instrument only will be needed as an "ultimate backstop" for the most extreme cases where the primary backstop funds are found to be insufficient.

== List of ESM Managing Directors ==
N°	Portrait	Name	Term
1		Klaus Regling	27 September 2012 – 7 October 2022
-	Christophe Frankel (interim managing director)		8 October 2022 – 30 November 2022
2		Pierre Gramegna	1 December 2022 – Present

== Contributions ==
Distribution of contributions
1. Germany (26.5%)
2. France (19.9%)
3. Italy (17.5%)
4. Spain (11.6%)
5. Netherlands (5.58%)
6. Belgium (3.40%)
7. Greece (2.75%)
8. Austria (2.72%)
9. Portugal (2.45%)
10. Finland (1.76%)
11. Ireland (1.55%)
12. Slovakia (0.97%)
13. Bulgaria (0.74%)
14. Croatia (0.52%)
15. Slovenia (0.46%)
16. Lithuania (0.40%)
17. Latvia (0.40%)
18. Estonia (0.25%)
19. Luxembourg (0.24%)
20. Cyprus (0.19%)
21. Malta (0.09%)

The ESM has an authorised capital of 500 billion euros of which 81 billion is paid-in capital, and the remaining 420 billion, if needed, will be loaned through the issuance of some special ESM obligations at the capital markets. The ESM treaty foresees a payment of the capital in five annual instalments, but the Eurogroup decided on 30 March 2012 that capital payments shall be accelerated and all the capital paid by the first half of 2014. The following table shows each member state's shares in the ESM, the capital subscribed by each member state as well as the paid-in capital each member state paid, following the ESM treaty and the capital keys.

ESM member state	ESM capital keys	Number of shares	Capital subscription (thousand €)	Paid-in capital (thousand €)	Nominal GDP 2025 (million €)
Germany	26.5090	1,894,528	189,452,800	21,651,750	4,469,810.0
France	19.9072	1,422,720	142,272,000	16,259,660	2,991,055.9
Italy	17.4931	1,250,187	125,018,700	14,287,850	2,258,048.7
Spain	11.6242	830,750	83,075,000	9,494,290	1,687,152.0
Netherlands	5.5828	398,988	39,898,800	4,559,860	1,179,458.0
Belgium	3.3954	242,662	24,266,200	2,773,280	642,015.3
Greece	2.7505	196,573	19,657,300	2,246,550	248,353.7
Austria	2.7180	194,252	19,425,200	2,220,020	514,328.1
Portugal	2.4503	175,114	17,511,400	2,001,300	306,741.7
Finland	1.7552	125,443	12,544,300	1,433,630	280,570.0
Ireland	1.5548	111,117	11,111,700	1,269,910	638,683.3
Slovakia	0.9706	69,369	6,936,900	792,790	136,754.3
Bulgaria	0.7385	52,781	5,278,100	603,210	116,018.3
Croatia	0.5170	36,950	3,695,000	422,290	92,975.1
Slovenia	0.4603	32,894	3,289,400	375,930	70,486.2
Lithuania	0.4007	28,634	2,863,400	327,200	84,258.0
Latvia	0.3971	28,382	2,838,200	324,400	43,026.2
Estonia	0.2506	17,907	1,790,700	204,650	41,620.8
Luxembourg	0.2445	17,477	1,747,700	199,740	89,521.5
Cyprus	0.1916	13,696	1,369,600	156,530	36,483.5
Malta	0.0885	6,323	632,300	72,260	24,577.9
Total	100%	7,146,747	714,674,700	81,677,100	15,951,938.5

At the moment when ESM has received all its paid-in capital from the eurozone countries, the ESM will be authorized to approve bailout deals for a maximum amount of €500 billion, with the remaining €200 billion of the fund being earmarked as safely invested capital reserve, in order to guarantee the issuance of ESM bonds will always get the highest AAA credit rating, with the lowest possible interest rate at the current time. 40% of the paid-in capital shall be transferred on 12 October 2012, with the remaining three times of 20% transfers scheduled for Q2-2013, Q4-2013 and Q2-2014. As the ESM lending capacity depends on the amount of paid-in capital, it will start out only to be €200bn in Q4-2012, and then be increased with €100bn each time one of the remaining three capital transfers ticks in. If needed, a majority of the ESM board can also decide to accelerate the payment schedule. On 1 May 2013, ESM has reconfirmed the schedule for receiving paid-in capital, with the third tranch already received in April 2013 followed by the fourth in October 2013, with the final fifth tranch scheduled for April 2014.

== Lending activities ==
The Troika currently negotiates with Spain and Cyprus, about setting up an economic recovery programme in return of providing support with financial loans from ESM. Cyprus so far applied both for a €6bn sovereign bailout loan and a €5bn bank recapitalisation package. Cyprus could however perhaps also be interested in additional support packages from instrument 3/4/5. Reportedly Spain beside of applying for a €100bn bank recapitalisation package in June 2012, now also follow a path of negotiations to get financial support from a Precautionary Conditioned Credit Line (PCCL) package. If Spain will apply and receive a PCCL package, irrespectively to what extent it subsequently decides to draw on this established credit line, this would at the same time immediately qualify the country also to receive "free" additional financial support from ECB, in the form of some yield-lowering bond purchases (OMT).

=== Bailout programmes for EU members since 2008 ===
The table below provides an overview of the financial composition of all bailout programs being initiated for EU member states, since the 2008 financial crisis. EU member states outside the eurozone (marked with yellow in the table) have no access to the funds provided by EFSF/ESM, but can be covered with rescue loans from EU's Balance of Payments programme (BoP), IMF and bilateral loans (with an extra possible assistance from the Worldbank/EIB/EBRD if classified as a development country). Since October 2012, the ESM as a permanent new financial stability fund to cover any future potential bailout packages within the eurozone, has effectively replaced the now defunct GLF + EFSM + EFSF funds. Whenever pledged funds in a scheduled bailout program were not transferred in full, the table has noted this by writing "Y out of X".

EU member	Time span	IMF (billion €)	World Bank (billion €)	EIB / EBRD (billion €)	Bilateral (billion €)	BoP (billion €)	GLF (billion €)	EFSM (billion €)	EFSF (billion €)	ESM (billion €)	Bailout in total (billion €)
Cyprus I^{1}	Dec.2011-Dec.2012	–	–	–	2.5	–	–	–	–	–	2.5^{1}
Cyprus II^{2}	May 2013-Mar.2016	1.0	–	–	–	–	–	–	–	6.3 out of 9.0	7.3 out of 10.0^{2}
Greece I+II^{3}	May 2010-Jun.2015	32.1 out of 48.1	–	–	–	–	52.9	–	130.9 out of 144.6	–	215.9 out of 245.6^{3}
Greece III^{4}	Aug.2015-Aug.2018	(proportion of 86, to be decided Oct.2015)	–	–	–	–	–	–	–	(up till 86)	86^{4}
Hungary^{5}	Nov.2008-Oct.2010	9.1 out of 12.5	1.0	–	–	5.5 out of 6.5	–	–	–	–	15.6 out of 20.0^{5}
Ireland^{6}	Nov.2010-Dec.2013	22.5	–	–	4.8	–	–	22.5	18.4	–	68.2^{6}
Latvia^{7}	Dec.2008-Dec.2011	1.1 out of 1.7	0.4	0.1	0.0 out of 2.2	2.9 out of 3.1	–	–	–	–	4.5 out of 7.5^{7}
Portugal^{8}	May 2011-Jun 2014	26.5 out of 27.4	–	–	–	–	–	24.3 out of 25.6	26.0	–	76.8 out of 79.0^{8}
Romania I^{9}	May 2009-Jun 2011	12.6 out of 13.6	1.0	1.0	–	5.0	–	–	–	–	19.6 out of 20.6^{9}
Romania II^{10}	Mar 2011-Jun 2013	0.0 out of 3.6	1.15	–	–	0.0 out of 1.4	–	–	–	–	1.15 out of 6.15^{10}
Romania III^{11}	Oct 2013-Sep 2015	0.0 out of 2.0	2.5	–	–	0.0 out of 2.0	–	–	–	–	2.5 out of 6.5^{11}
Spain^{12}	July 2012-Dec.2013	–	–	–	–	–	–	–	–	41.3 out of 100	41.3 out of 100^{12}
Total payment	Nov.2008-Aug.2018	104.9	6.05	1.1	7.3	13.4	52.9	46.8	175.3	136.3	544.05

1 Cyprus received in late December 2011 a €2.5bn bilateral emergency bailout loan from Russia, to cover its governmental budget deficits and a refinancing of maturing governmental debts until 31 December 2012. Initially the bailout loan was supposed to be fully repaid in 2016, but as part of establishment of the later following second Cypriot bailout programme, Russia accepted a delayed repayment in eight biannual tranches throughout 2018–2021 - while also lowering its requested interest rate from 4.5% to 2.5%.
2 When it became evident Cyprus needed an additional bailout loan to cover the government's fiscal operations throughout 2013–2015, on top of additional funding needs for recapitalization of the Cypriot financial sector, negotiations for such an extra bailout package started with the Troika in June 2012. In December 2012 a preliminary estimate indicated, that the needed overall bailout package should have a size of €17.5bn, comprising €10bn for bank recapitalisation and €6.0bn for refinancing maturing debt plus €1.5bn to cover budget deficits in 2013+2014+2015, which in total would have increased the Cypriot debt-to-GDP ratio to around 140%. The final agreed package however only entailed a €10bn support package, financed partly by IMF (€1bn) and ESM (€9bn), because it was possible to reach a fund saving agreement with the Cypriot authorities, featuring a direct closure of the most troubled Laiki Bank and a forced bail-in recapitalisation plan for Bank of Cyprus.
The final conditions for activation of the bailout package was outlined by the Troika's MoU agreement in April 2013, and include: (1) Recapitalisation of the entire financial sector while accepting a closure of the Laiki bank, (2) Implementation of the anti–money laundering framework in Cypriot financial institutions, (3) Fiscal consolidation to help bring down the Cypriot governmental budget deficit, (4) Structural reforms to restore competitiveness and macroeconomic imbalances, (5) Privatization programme. The Cypriot debt-to-GDP ratio is on this background now forecasted only to peak at 126% in 2015 and subsequently decline to 105% in 2020, and thus considered to remain within sustainable territory. The €10bn bailout comprise €4.1bn spend on debt liabilities (refinancing and amortization), 3.4bn to cover fiscal deficits, and €2.5bn for the bank recapitalization. These amounts will be paid to Cyprus through regular tranches from 13 May 2013 until 31 March 2016. According to the programme this will be sufficient, as Cyprus during the programme period in addition will: Receive €1.0bn extraordinary revenue from privatization of government assets, ensure an automatic roll-over of €1.0bn maturing Treasury Bills and €1.0bn of maturing bonds held by domestic creditors, bring down the funding need for bank recapitalization with €8.7bn — of which 0.4bn is reinjection of future profit earned by the Cyprus Central Bank (injected in advance at the short term by selling its gold reserve) and €8.3bn origin from the bail-in of creditors in Laiki bank and Bank of Cyprus. The forced automatic rollover of maturing bonds held by domestic creditors were conducted in 2013, and equaled according to some credit rating agencies a "selective default" or "restrictive default", mainly because the fixed yields of the new bonds did not reflect the market rates — while maturities at the same time automatically were extended. Cyprus successfully concluded its three-year financial assistance programme at the end of March 2016, having borrowed a total of €6.3 billion from the European Stability Mechanism and €1 billion from the International Monetary Fund. The remaining €2.7 billion of the ESM bailout was never dispensed, due to the Cypriot government's better than expected finances over the course of the programme.
3 Many sources list the first bailout was €110bn followed by the second on €130bn. When you deduct €2.7bn due to Ireland+Portugal+Slovakia opting out as creditors for the first bailout, and add the extra €8.2bn IMF has promised to pay Greece for the years in 2015-16 (through a programme extension implemented in December 2012), the total amount of bailout funds sums up to €245.6bn. The first bailout resulted in a payout of €20.1bn from IMF and €52.9bn from GLF, during the course of May 2010 until December 2011, and then it was technically replaced by a second bailout package for 2012-2016, which had a size of €172.6bn (€28bn from IMF and €144.6bn from EFSF), as it included the remaining committed amounts from the first bailout package. All committed IMF amounts were made available to the Greek government for financing its continued operation of public budget deficits and to refinance maturing public debt held by private creditors and IMF. The payments from EFSF were earmarked to finance €35.6bn of PSI restructured government debt (as part of a deal where private investors in return accepted a nominal haircut, lower interest rates and longer maturities for their remaining principal), €48.2bn for bank recapitalization, €11.3bn for a second PSI debt buy-back, while the remaining €49.5bn were made available to cover continued operation of public budget deficits. The combined programme was scheduled to expire in March 2016, after IMF had extended their programme period with extra loan tranches from January 2015 to March 2016 (as a mean to help Greece service the total sum of interests accruing during the lifespan of already issued IMF loans), while the Eurogroup at the same time opted to conduct their reimbursement and deferral of interests outside their bailout programme framework — with the EFSF programme still being planned to end in December 2014.
Due to the refusal by the Greek government to comply with the agreed conditional terms for receiving a continued flow of bailout transfers, both IMF and the Eurogroup opted to freeze their programmes since August 2014. To avoid a technical expiry, the Eurogroup postponed the expiry date for its frozen programme to 30 June 2015, paving the way within this new deadline for the possibility of transfer terms first to be renegotiated and then finally complied with to ensure completion of the programme. As Greece withdrew unilaterally from the process of settling renegotiated terms and time extension for the completion of the programme, it expired uncompleted on 30 June 2015. Hereby, Greece lost the possibility to extract €13.7bn of remaining funds from the EFSF (€1.0bn unused PSI and Bond Interest facilities, €10.9bn unused bank recapitalization funds and a €1.8bn frozen tranche of macroeconomic support), and also lost the remaining SDR 13.561bn of IMF funds (being equal to €16.0bn as per the SDR exchange rate on 5 Jan 2012), although those lost IMF funds might be recouped if Greece settles an agreement for a new third bailout programme with ESM — and passes the first review of such programme.
4 A new third bailout programme worth €86bn in total, jointly covered by funds from IMF and ESM, will be disbursed in tranches from August 2015 until August 2018. The programme was approved to be negotiated on 17 July 2015, and approved in full detail by the publication of an ESM facility agreement on 19 August 2015. IMF's transfer of the "remainder of its frozen I+II programme" and their new commitment also to contribute with a part of the funds for the third bailout, depends on a successful prior completion of the first review of the new third programme in October 2015. Due to a matter of urgency, EFSM immediately conducted a temporary €7.16bn emergency transfer to Greece on 20 July 2015, which was fully overtaken by ESM when the first tranche of the third program was conducted 20 August 2015. Due to being temporary bridge financing and not part of an official bailout programme, the table do not display this special type of EFSM transfer.
The loans of the program has an average maturity of 32.5 years and carry a variable interest rate (currently at 1%). The program has earmarked transfer of up till €25bn for bank recapitalization purposes (to be used to the extent deemed needed by the annual stress tests of European Banking Supervision), and also include establishment of a new privatization fund to conduct sale of Greek public assets — of which the first generated €25bn will be used for early repayment of the bailout loans earmarked for bank recapitalizations. Potential debt relief for Greece, in the form of longer grace and payment periods, will be considered by the European public creditors after the first review of the new programme, by October/November 2015.
5 Hungary recovered faster than expected, and thus did not receive the remaining €4.4bn bailout support scheduled for October 2009-October 2010. IMF paid in total 7.6 out of 10.5 billion SDR, equal to €9.1bn out of €12.5bn at current exchange rates.
6 In Ireland the National Treasury Management Agency also paid €17.5bn for the program on behalf of the Irish government, of which €10bn were injected by the National Pensions Reserve Fund and the remaining €7.5bn paid by "domestic cash resources", which helped increase the program total to €85bn. As this extra amount by technical terms is an internal bail-in, it has not been added to the bailout total. As of 31 March 2014 all committed funds had been transferred, with EFSF even paying €0.7bn more, so that the total amount of funds had been marginally increased from €67.5bn to €68.2bn.
7 Latvia recovered faster than expected, and thus did not receive the remaining €3.0bn bailout support originally scheduled for 2011.
8 Portugal completed its support programme as scheduled in June 2014, one month later than initially planned due to awaiting a verdict by its constitutional court, but without asking for establishment of any subsequent precautionary credit line facility. By the end of the programme all committed amounts had been transferred, except for the last tranche of €2.6bn (1.7bn from EFSM and 0.9bn from IMF), which the Portuguese government declined to receive. The reason why the IMF transfers still mounted to slightly more than the initially committed €26bn, was due to its payment with SDR's instead of euro — and some favorable developments in the EUR-SDR exchange rate compared to the beginning of the programme. In November 2014, Portugal received its last delayed €0.4bn tranche from EFSM (post programme), hereby bringing its total drawn bailout amount up at €76.8bn out of €79.0bn.
9 Romania recovered faster than expected, and thus did not receive the remaining €1.0bn bailout support originally scheduled for 2011.
10 Romania had a precautionary credit line with €5.0bn available to draw money from if needed, during the period March 2011-June 2013; but entirely avoided to draw on it. During the period, the World Bank however supported with a transfer of €0.4bn as a DPL3 development loan programme and €0.75bn as results based financing for social assistance and health.
11 Romania had a second €4bn precautionary credit line established jointly by IMF and EU, of which IMF accounts for SDR 1.75134bn = €2bn, which is available to draw money from if needed during the period from October 2013 to 30 September 2015. In addition the World Bank also made €1bn available under a Development Policy Loan with a deferred drawdown option valid from January 2013 through December 2015. The World Bank will throughout the period also continue providing earlier committed development programme support of €0.891bn, but this extra transfer is not accounted for as "bailout support" in the third programme due to being "earlier committed amounts". In April 2014, the World Bank increased their support by adding the transfer of a first €0.75bn Fiscal Effectiveness and Growth Development Policy Loan, with the final second FEG-DPL tranch on €0.75bn (worth about $1bn) to be contracted in the first part of 2015. No money had been drawn from the precautionary credit line, as of May 2014.
12 Spain's €100bn support package has been earmarked only for recapitalisation of the financial sector. Initially an EFSF emergency account with €30bn was available, but nothing was drawn, and it was cancelled again in November 2012 after being superseded by the regular ESM recapitalisation programme. The first ESM recapitalisation tranch of €39.47bn was approved 28 November, and transferred to the bank recapitalisation fund of the Spanish government (FROB) on 11 December 2012. A second tranch for "category 2" banks on €1.86n was approved by the Commission on 20 December, and finally transferred by ESM on 5 February 2013. "Category 3" banks were also subject for a possible third tranch in June 2013, in case they failed before then to acquire sufficient additional capital funding from private markets. During January 2013, all "category 3" banks however managed to fully recapitalise through private markets and thus will not be in need for any State aid. The remaining €58.7bn of the initial support package is thus not expected to be activated, but will stay available as a fund with precautionary capital reserves to possibly draw upon if unexpected things happen — until 31 December 2013. In total €41.3bn out of the available €100bn was transferred. Upon the scheduled exit of the programme, no follow-up assistance was requested.

== Critics ==
Critics have noted that the ESM severely confines the economic sovereignty of its member states and criticise that it provides extensive powers and immunity to the board of ESM Governors without parliamentary influence or control. Think-tanks such as the World Pensions Council (WPC) have argued that the European Stability Mechanism is the product of a short-term political consensus, and thus will not be conductive of a durable, cohesive institutional solution. In their perspective, a profound revision of the Lisbon Treaty itself is unavoidable if Germany is to succeed in imposing its economic views, as stringent orthodoxy across the budgetary, fiscal and regulatory fronts will necessarily have to go beyond the treaty in its current form, thus further reducing the individual prerogatives of national governments.

Italy

Strong criticism against the ESM has been growing in Italy, led by far-right political forces and the Five Stars Movement. As a result, the Italian government has been blocking the negotiations of a proposed reform of the ESM Treaty for several months at the Eurogroup level.

Estonia

In Estonia a group of MPs have called for a referendum on the treaty. On 8 August 2012, during the first reading of the bill ratifying the ESM in Riigikogu, the Estonian Centre Party put forward a motion to reject the bill. However, this motion was defeated in parliament by 56 votes against, with 33 voting for.

Germany

In Germany some members of FDP (liberal party) and CSU (conservative Bavarian party), both minor parties of the previous government coalition, were against the European Stability Mechanism. The Left, Pirate Party Germany and NPD also oppose the ESM, the latter comparing it with the Enabling Act of 1933. Ten members of the Bundetag founded the Alliance Against the ESM.

Finland

Both opposition parties the Finns Party and the Centre Party oppose the ESM.

France

Left Front and left wing presidential candidate Jean-Luc Mélenchon oppose the ESM.

Netherlands

The Socialist Party opposes the ESM. Geert Wilders' Party for Freedom opposes any increase or systematisation of transfer payments, from the Netherlands to other EU countries, through means such as the ESM.

Slovakia

An opposition liberal party Freedom and Solidarity is a staunch opponent of the ESM.

Spain

Banks in Spain were recapitalized by the ERM converting their private debt into public debt and downgrading the credit rating of Spanish government debt.

== Further developments ==
The New Hanseatic League, established in February 2018 by like-minded finance ministers from Denmark, Estonia, Finland, Ireland, Latvia, Lithuania, the Netherlands and Sweden, is pushing to develop the European Stability Mechanism into a full European Monetary Fund that would redistribute wealth from trade surplus to trade deficit EU member states.

In 2020, the Delors Centre think tank proposed a major reform to the ESM by bringing it into EU law.

== See also ==
- European Financial Stability Facility
- European Financial Stabilisation Mechanism
- European Fiscal Compact
- Maiden Lane Transactions
- Term Asset-Backed Securities Loan Facility
- Treaties of the European Union
- Troubled Assets Relief Program
- List of acronyms: European sovereign-debt crisis
