= Charles Dallara =

American banker (born 1948)

Former managing director of the Institute of International Finance
- In office 1993–2013
- Succeeded by: Timothy D. Adams

Personal details
- Born: 25 August 1948 (age 78) Spartanburg, South Carolina, U.S.
- Education: University of South Carolina, Columbia; Fletcher School of Law and Diplomacy, Tufts University

Charles H. Dallara (born 25 August 1948) is an American banker and the former managing director of the Institute of International Finance.

== Education ==
Dallara holds a B.A. in economics from the University of South Carolina, Columbia, and two M.A. degrees and a Ph.D. from the Fletcher School of Law and Diplomacy, Tufts University.

== Career in banking ==
Dallara was managing director of the Institute of International Finance, Inc. from 1993 to 2013. He oversaw the growth of the institute from its roots as an informal group of predominantly US and Japanese commercial banks that negotiated Latin American debt restructurings to a global trade association for 461 diverse financial firms, half of which are headquartered in emerging markets. Dallara led the IIF in its prominent role during the European sovereign debt crisis, including the private sector involvement (PSI) agreement reached between European countries and financial organisations on the one hand and the Greek government on the other, "the biggest sovereign restructuring in history".

He was previously managing director at J.P. Morgan & Co. from June 1991 to July 1993, after working as head of Morgan's investment and commercial banking business in Eastern Europe and the former Soviet Union, the Middle East, Africa and India.

Dallara is currently an Advisory Partner of Partners Group and Chairman of Partners Group Board of Directors, USA.

== Government and civil service appointments ==
Dallara held various positions in the George H. W. Bush and Ronald Reagan administrations: Assistant Secretary of the Treasury for Policy Development and Senior Advisor for Policy to the Secretary of the Treasury (1988-1989); U.S. Executive Director of the International Monetary Fund (1984-1989), and concurrently as Senior Deputy Assistant Secretary of the Treasury for International Economic Policy (1985-1988); Deputy Assistant Secretary of the Treasury for International Monetary Affairs (1983-1985); and U.S. Alternate Executive Director at the IMF (1982-1983).

== Other appointments ==
Dallara is a member of the Council on Foreign Relations and serves on the international advisory board of the Instituto de Empresa graduate business school in Madrid, Spain. He is a member of the board of overseers of the Fletcher School of Law and Diplomacy of Tufts University and an executive board member of the Bertelsmann Foundation office in Washington, D.C.

Dallara is a member of the board of directors of the Private Export Funding Corporation (PEFCO), an American company whose shareholders include commercial banks, industrial companies and financial services companies and which facilitates American exports by purchasing the debt obligations of importers of American goods.

== See also ==
- List of protagonists: European sovereign-debt crisis
