= Private sector =

Economic sector not under state control

The private sector is the part of the economy which is owned by private groups, usually as a means of establishment for profit or non profit, rather than being owned by the government.

== Employment ==
The private sector employs most of the workforce in some countries. In the private sector, activities are guided by the motive to earn money, i.e. operate by capitalist standards.

A 2013 study by the International Finance Corporation (part of the World Bank Group) identified that 90 percent of jobs in developing countries are in the private sector.

== Diversification ==
In free enterprise countries, such as the United States, the private sector is wider, and the state places fewer constraints on firms. In countries with more government authority, such as China, the public sector makes up most of the economy.

== Regulation ==
States legally regulate the private sector. Businesses operating within a country must comply with the laws in that country. In some cases, usually involving multinational corporations that can pick and choose their suppliers and locations based on their perception of the regulatory environment, local state regulations have resulted in uneven practices within one company. For example, workers in one country may benefit from strong labour unions, while workers in another country have very weak laws supporting labour unions, even though they work for the same employer. In some cases, industries and individual businesses choose self-regulation by applying higher standards for dealing with their workers, customers, or the environment than the minimum that is legally required of them.

There can be negative effects from the private sector. In the early 1980s, the Corrections Corporation of America pioneered the idea of running prisons for a profit. Today, corporate-run prisons hold eight percent of America's inmates. Since it is from the private sector, their main priority is not rehabilitation, but profit. This has resulted in many human rights violations across the United States.

== See also ==
- Company law – Body of law that governs businesses
- Free enterprise – Form of market-based economy
- Private enterprise – Business which is not publicly traded
- Private law – Civil legal system involving relationships between individuals
- Private military company – Company providing armed combat or security services
- Private school – School that is not dependent upon the state
- Private sector development – Term in the international development industry
- Private sector involvement – Cut in the value of private sector's holdings of debt
- Privatization – Transferring something from the public sphere to the private
- Public economics – Study of government economic and fiscal policy
- Public-private partnership – Partnership between a government and private company
- Public sector – Public part of the economy
- Three-sector model – Model in economics
- Voluntary sector – Social activity undertaken by non-governmental nonprofit organizations; "third sector"
