= Alliance Against the ESM =

The Alliance Against the ESM (German: Allianz gegen den ESM) is a political organisation in Germany dedicated to opposing the European Stability Mechanism (ESM).

It was founded in 2012 with the support of ten members of the Bundestag, with five from each of the Christian Democratic Union and Free Democratic Party:

CDU members

- Veronika Bellmann
- Thomas Dörflinger
- Alexander Funk
- Manfred Kolbe
- Klaus-Peter Willsch

FDP members

- Jens Ackermann
- Sylvia Canel
- Lutz Knopek
- Lars Lindemann
- Frank Schäffler

Outside the Bundestag, the Alliance found the support of the German Taxpayers Federation.
