= Pierre Gramegna =

Luxembourgish politician

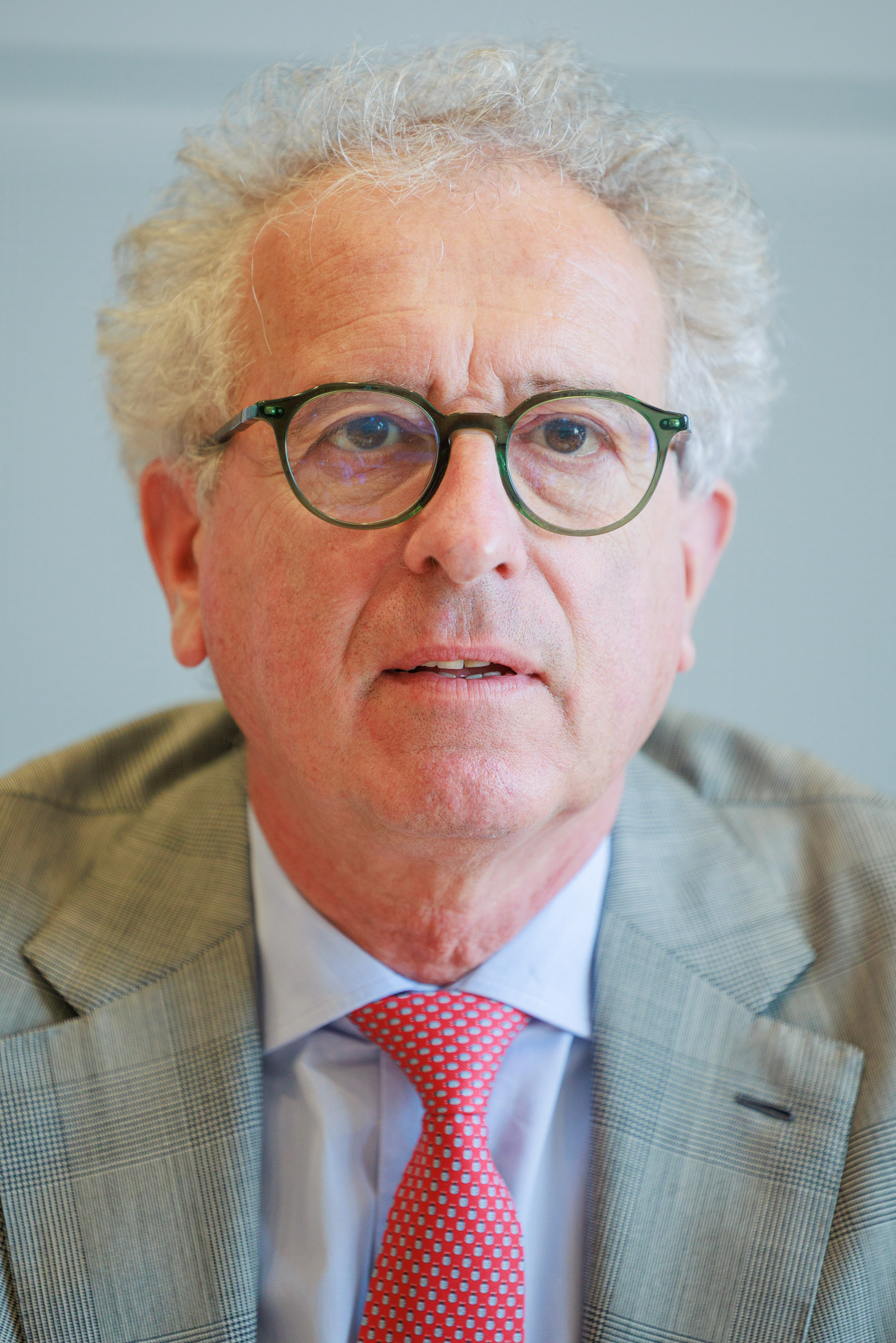
- Gramegna in 2024

Managing Director of the European Stability Mechanism
- Incumbent
- Assuming office 1 December 2022
- Succeeding: Christophe Frankel (acting)

Minister for Finances
- In office 4 December 2013 – 4 January 2022
- Prime Minister: Xavier Bettel
- Preceded by: Luc Frieden
- Succeeded by: Yuriko Backes

Personal details
- Born: 22 April 1958 (age 67) Esch-sur-Alzette, Luxembourg
- Party: Democratic
- Education: Panthéon-Assas University

Pierre Gramegna (born 22 April 1958) is a Luxembourgish career diplomat and politician who has been serving as managing director of the European Stability Mechanism (ESM) since 2022. A member of the Democratic Party, he previously served as Minister for Finances from 2013 to 2022, under the Bettel I and II governments.

== Early life and education ==
Gramegna was born and grew up in Esch-sur-Alzette. He then attended Panthéon-Assas University, where he studied economics and law, receiving a master's degree in civil law from the university in 1981, and a degree in economic science in 1982. He completed his postgraduate education with a DEA in community law.

== Diplomatic career ==
Gramegna joined the Ministry of Foreign Affairs in 1983. He was an economic and political affairs adviser at the Luxembourgish embassy in Paris from 1988 to 1993. He was subsequently appointed consul general and director of the Board of Economic Development in San Francisco. From 1996 to 2002, Gramegna served as Luxembourg's ambassador to Japan and South Korea, before heading the Directorate for International Economic Relations at the Ministry of Foreign Affairs for a short period of time in 2002. In 2003, Gramegna became director general of the Chamber of Commerce of Luxembourg, a post he held until he was asked to join the government at the end of 2013.

== Political career ==
Following the 2013 general election in which he had not taken part, Gramegna was a surprise appointment to the Bettel Government as the Minister for Finances. He joined the Democratic Party shortly before being sworn in. Gramegna had been previously mostly known for his lobbyist work for the business community as well his promotional activities outside of Luxembourg in his capacity as director general of the Luxembourg Chamber of Commerce.

In November 2017, Gramegna submitted his formal application for succeeding Jeroen Dijsselbloem as the next chairman of the Eurogroup; in the vote, he lost in the second round to Mário Centeno. In 2020, he was again nominated by his government for that role, this time competing against Nadia Calviño and Paschal Donohoe.

In 2022, Gramegna became Luxembourg’s nominee to succeed Klaus Regling as Managing Director of the European Stability Mechanism; his candidacy was later endorsed by the German government. The nomination process narrowed to Gramegna and João Leão, but both pulled out in September 2022 having failed to secure the votes required. By November, Italy and France gave up their opposition to Gramegna, and he was voted by the Board to become the next managing director.

== Other activities ==
=== Corporate boards ===
- Luxembourg Stock Exchange, Member of the Board of Directors

=== European Union organizations ===
- European Investment Bank (EIB), Ex-Officio Member of the Board of Governors (2013–2022)
- European Stability Mechanism (ESM), Member of the Board of Governors (2013–2022)

=== International organizations ===
- African Development Bank (AfDB), Ex-Officio Member of the Board of Governors (2013–2022)
- Asian Development Bank (ADB), Ex-Officio Member of the Board of Governors (2013–2022)
- Asian Infrastructure Investment Bank (AIIB), Ex-Officio Member of the Board of Governors (2016–2022)
- European Bank for Reconstruction and Development (EBRD), Ex-Officio Member of the Board of Governors (2013–2022)
- International Monetary Fund (IMF), Ex-Officio Member of the Board of Governors (2013–2022)
- Multilateral Investment Guarantee Agency (MIGA), World Bank Group, Ex-Officio Member of the Board of Governors (2013–2022)
- World Bank, Ex-Officio Member of the Board of Governors (2013–2022)

Political offices
| Preceded by Luc Frieden | Minister for Finances; 2013–2022 | Succeeded by Yuriko Backes |
