= Maiden Lane Transactions =

American companies

Maiden Lane Transactions refers to three limited liability companies created by the Federal Reserve Bank of New York in 2008 as financial vehicles to facilitate transactions involving three entities: the former Bear Stearns company as the first entity, the lending division of the former American International Group (AIG) as the second, and the former AIG's credit default swap division as the third. The name Maiden Lane was taken from the street on the north side of the Federal Reserve Bank's Manhattan location.

On June 14, 2012, the Federal Reserve Bank of New York announced that its loans to Maiden Lane LLC (ML LLC) and Maiden Lane III LLC (ML III LLC) were fully repaid with interest. The original amounts of these loans were $28.82 billion and $24.3 billion respectively. Maiden Lane II LLC had repaid its obligation of $19.4 billion (~$26.1 billion in 2024) on February 28, 2012.

== Bear Stearns bailout ==
Maiden Lane LLC was created when JPMorgan Chase took over Bear Stearns in early 2008. Bear Stearns held an asset portfolio that JPMorgan found too risky to assume in whole, and consequently the Federal Reserve Bank of New York created Maiden Lane LLC and extended a $28.82 billion loan to it. JPMorgan lent an additional $1.15 billion. Maiden Lane used the money to buy approximately $30 billion of Bear Stearns's assets which it then sold gradually. Although initial analysis by Bank of America projected losses from $2 to $6 billion on the portfolio, it ultimately produced a net gain of $2.5 billion.

Maiden Lane was organized as Delaware Limited Liability Company on April 29, 2008, and registered to do business as a foreign limited liability company in the state of New York on June 26, 2008.

== AIG bailout ==
During the federal government's bailout of AIG in September 2008, the holding companies Maiden Lane II LLC and Maiden Lane III LLC were created, and they were funded with loans of $19.5 billion and $24.3 billion from the Federal Reserve. The federal government's total investment in the AIG bailout, including both Maiden Lane II and III and actions by the U.S. Treasury, was $182 billion.

=== Maiden Lane II LLC ===
Maiden Lane II LLC aimed to purchase residential mortgage-backed securities (RMBS) held by AIG's subsidiaries which were considered very risky. On December 12, 2008, the Federal Reserve Bank of New York began extending credit to Maiden Lane II LLC. An October 7, 2010 update to the Federal Reserve balance sheet, as of October 6, 2010, reported the fair market value of net portfolio holdings were valued at $15.847 billion.

Maiden Lane II used billions in bailout money to purchase toxic assets, and AIG used billions to pay other banks, including foreign banks—France's Societe Generale at $11.9 billion, Germany's Deutsche Bank at $11.8 billion, and Britain's Barclays PLC at $8.5 billion. AIG, through this fund, also funneled significant bailout money to US banks that had already been bailed out under the Troubled Asset Relief Program. As AIG counterparties, Goldman Sachs got $12.9 billion, Bank of America got $5.2 billion, and Citigroup got $2.3 billion all at 100% on the dollar.

In February 2012 the New York Fed announced that the remaining securities in ML II had been sold, and would result in full repayment of the $19.5 billion loan extended by the New York Fed, with a net gain of approximately $2.8 billion, including $580 million in accrued interest.

=== Maiden Lane III LLC ===
AIG collected premiums from counterparties by entering into credit default swap contracts on collateralized debt obligations (CDOs). During the third quarter of 2007 and continuing through 2008, the market value of the CDOs underlying these swap contracts fell. As the value of the underlying CDOs fell, AIG had to honor the credit default swap contracts and post collateral. During the nine months ending September 30, 2008, AIG posted in excess of $52 billion (~$74.2 billion in 2024) of collateral to counterparties. Maiden Lane III LLC aimed to purchase these multi-sector CDOs in order to provide a cap on AIG's collateral payments. On November 25, 2008, the Federal Reserve Bank of New York began extending credit to Maiden Lane III LLC. An October 7, 2010 update to the Federal Reserve balance sheet, as of October 6, 2010, reported the fair market value of net portfolio holdings were valued at $23.003 billion.

As markets recovered and issuance of new securitized products dried up, private investors including banks became interested in purchasing the assets in Maiden Lane III. On August 23, 2012, the Federal Reserve announced that Maiden Lane III had sold the last of its AIG portfolio that day. The Fed had earned a profit of $17.7 billion from the AIG bailout and related assets. The bulk of all Fed profits are required by Fed rules to be turned over to the U.S. Treasury. The Treasury still held a 53 percent stake in AIG's stock which it planned to gradually sell in an effort to recover the remaining $24.2 billion investment.
