= Klaus Regling =

German economist

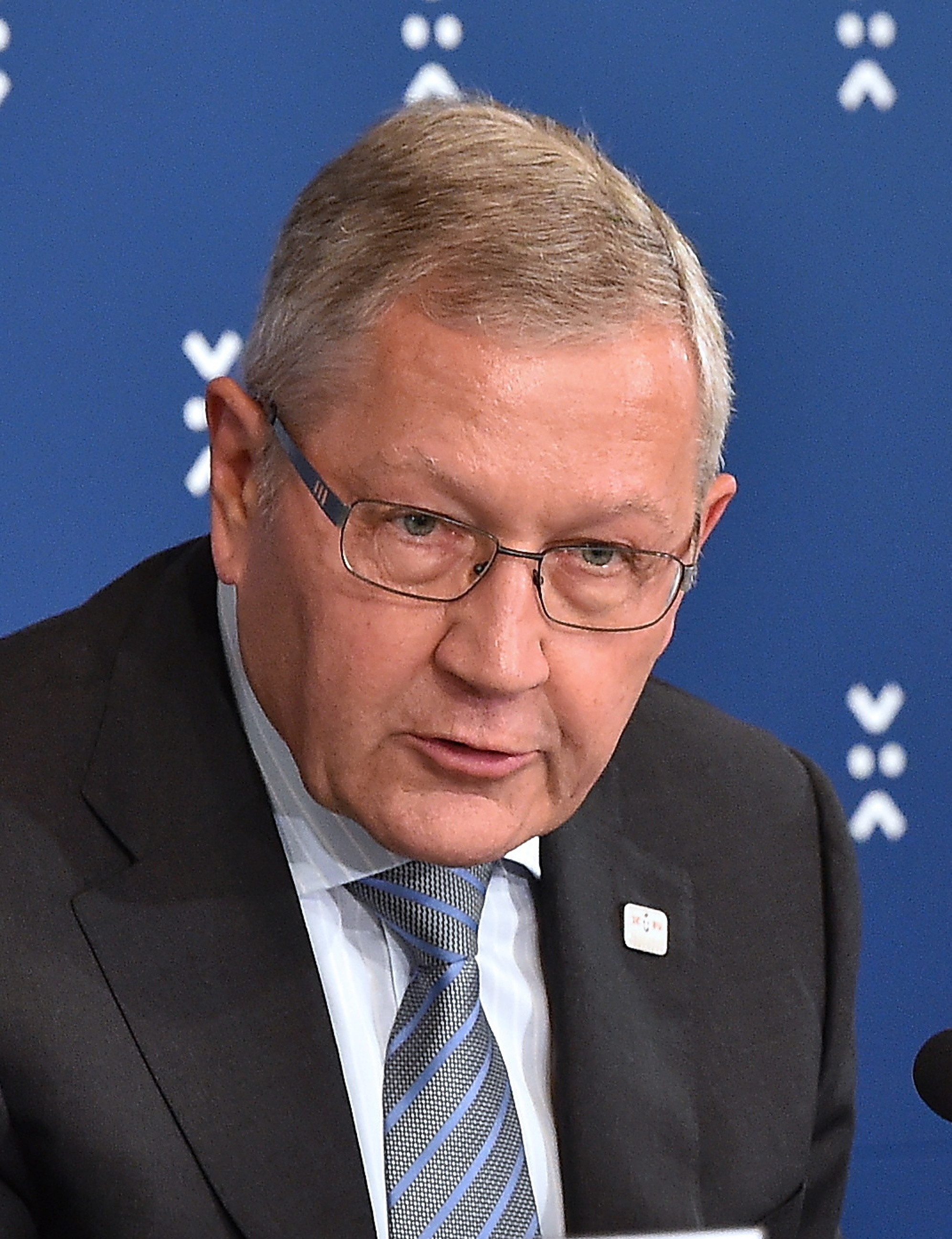
- Regling in 2016

Managing Director of the European Stability Mechanism
- In office 27 September 2012 – 7 October 2022
- Preceded by: Position established
- Succeeded by: Christophe Frankel (acting)

Personal details
- Born: 3 October 1950 (age 74); Lübeck, West Germany (now Germany)
- Education: University of Hamburg; University of Regensburg

Klaus P. Regling (born 3 October 1950) is a German economist and the former Chief Executive Officer of the European Financial Stability Facility (EFSF) and Managing Director of the European Stability Mechanism. Regling was reportedly considered as a possible head of the European Central Bank to succeed Jean Claude Trichet.

== Early life and education ==
The son of a carpenter who sat in the German Bundestag for the Social Democrats, Regling studied economics at the University of Hamburg, and after receiving his bachelor's degree in 1971 went on to the University of Regensburg, where he earned a master's in the subject in 1975.

== Career ==
In 1975 Regling began work at the International Monetary Fund (IMF) in Washington, D.C. He spent his first two years as part of the IMF's Economist Program, specifically the Research and African Department, and the following three years as an economist in the Research Department.

In 1980 Regling left and spent a year in the Economics Department of the Association of German Banks (BdB) before being hired as an economist by the German Ministry of Finance, where he worked in the European Monetary Affairs Division until 1985. That year he returned to the IMF and worked both in Washington as well as in Jakarta, Indonesia. In 1991 Regling left the IMF once again and returned to the German Ministry of Finance, where he was named the Chief of the International Monetary Affairs Division. In 1993 he became the Deputy Director-General for International Monetary and Financial Relations and in 1995 the Director-General for European and International Financial Relations. In this capacity, he served as Chancellor Helmut Kohl’s representative to the IMF and the Group of Seven industrialised nations. While at the Ministry, he also held the roles of an alternate governor to the Asian Development Bank and the Inter-American Development Bank as well as on the supervisory board of Hermes Credit Insurance. He remained with the ministry until 1998.

In 1999, Regling entered the private sector as the Managing Director of the Moore Capital Strategy Group in London, where his colleagues included David Lipton and Philipp Hildebrand. In addition to his role at Moore Capital, he served on the Financial Sector Review Group appointed by the Managing Director of the IMF, Horst Köhler, to provide the organization with an independent perspective on how it should organize its financial sector and capital markets work.

Regling was appointed Director-General of the European Commission's Economic and Financial Affairs Directorate General in 2001 and remained in post till June 2008. From 2008 to March 2009 he was part of the Issing Commission, which was formed by Chancellor Angela Merkel to advise the government on financial regulatory reform. He also became chairman of the Brussels-based KR Economics consultancy. On July 1, 2010 he became head of the European Financial Stability Facility.

== Other activities ==
- European Bank for Reconstruction and Development (EBRD), Ex-Officio Alternate Member of the Board of Governors (2001-2008)
