= Term Asset-Backed Securities Loan Facility =

US Fed program to spur consumer credit lending

The Term Asset-Backed Securities Loan Facility (TALF) is a program created by the U.S. Federal Reserve (the Fed) to spur consumer credit lending. The program was announced on November 25, 2008, and was to support the issuance of asset-backed securities (ABS) collateralized by student loans, auto loans, credit card loans, and loans guaranteed by the Small Business Administration (SBA). Under TALF, the Federal Reserve Bank of New York (NY Fed) authorized up to $200 billion of loans on a non-recourse basis to holders of certain AAA-rated ABS backed by newly and recently originated consumer and small business loans. (However, only approximately $70 billion was ever lent, and only approximately $50 billion at any one time.) As TALF money did not originate from the U.S. Treasury, the program did not require congressional approval to disburse funds, but an act of Congress forced the Fed to reveal how it lent the money. The TALF began operation in March 2009 and was closed on June 30, 2010. TALF 2 was initiated in 2020 during the COVID-19 pandemic.

== Purpose ==
The Fed explained the reasoning behind the TALF as follows:

New issuance of ABS declined precipitously in September and came to a halt in October. At the same time, interest rate spreads on AAA-rated tranches of ABS soared to levels well outside the range of historical experience, reflecting unusually high risk premiums. The ABS markets historically have funded a substantial share of consumer credit and SBA-guaranteed small business loans. Continued disruption of these markets could significantly limit the availability of credit to households and small businesses and thereby contribute to further weakening of U.S. economic activity. The TALF is designed to increase credit availability and support economic activity by facilitating renewed issuance of consumer and small business ABS at more normal interest rate spreads.

== Structure and terms ==
According to the plan, the NY Fed would spend up to $200 billion in loans to spur the market in securities backed by lending to small business and consumers. Yet, the program closed after only funding the purchase of $43 billion in loans. Barbara Kiviat, TALF money was not to go directly to those small businesses and consumers, but to the issuers of asset-backed securities. The NY Fed would take the securities as collateral for more loans the issuers would ostensibly make. To manage the TALF loans, the NY Fed was to create a special-purpose vehicle (SPV) that would buy the assets securing the TALF loans. The U.S. Treasury's Troubled Assets Relief Program (TARP) of the Emergency Economic Stabilization Act of 2008 would finance the first $20 billion of asset purchases by buying debt in the SPV.

Eligible collateral included U.S. dollar-denominated cash ABS with a long-term credit rating in the highest investment-grade rating category from two or more major nationally recognized statistical rating organizations (NRSROs) and do not have a long-term credit rating of below the highest investment-grade rating category from a major NRSRO. Synthetic ABS (credit default swaps on ABS) do not qualify as eligible collateral. The program was launched on March 3, 2009.

Under TALF, the Fed lent $71.1 billion, but never more than $49 billion at any one time before it stopped making new loans in July 2010. About $11.6 billion in loans remained outstanding as of then, according to Fed data. No credit losses have been reported. Because the money came from the Fed and not the Treasury, there was no congressional oversight of how the funds were disbursed, until an act of Congress forced the Fed to open its books. Congressional staffers are examining more than 21,000 transactions. One study estimated that the subsidy rate on the TALF's $12.1 billion of loans to by buy commercial mortgage backed securities (CMBS) was 34 percent.

== The Public-Private Investment Program ==
On March 23, 2009, U.S. Treasury Secretary Timothy Geithner announced the Public-Private Investment Program (PPIP) to help struggling banks by buying up to $1 trillion of toxic assets from their' balance sheets. The program was to revive the market for unpackaged loans and mortgage securities not backed by Fannie Mae, Freddie Mac or other government-supported institutions.

There were two primary programs, the Legacy Loans Program and the Legacy Securities Program. The Federal Deposit Insurance Corporation (FDIC) was to provide non-recourse loan guarantees for up to 85 percent of the purchase price; asset managers were to raise money from private investors, with capital and loans from taxpayers through the U.S. Treasury, TARP and TALF providing the rest of the funds. The initial size of PPIP was projected to be $500 billion of the $1 trillion limit and was expected to free up money for lending.

The major stock market indexes in the United States rallied on the day of the announcement rising by over six percent, with shares of bank stocks leading the way. Economist Paul Krugman was very critical of the program, arguing the non-recourse loans led to a hidden subsidy that would be split by asset managers, banks' shareholders and creditors. Banking analyst Meridith Whitney argued that banks would not sell bad assets at fair market values because they would be reluctant to take asset writedowns. However, just months after PPIP began, the debt became a money-maker when the bonds rallied and banks, instead of purging their balance sheets of toxic assets, began buying more home loan bonds lacking government guarantees. Bank of America, Citigroup, Morgan Stanley and Goldman Sachs added a combined $3.36 billion (~$4.49 billion in 2023) of the debt, which just months earlier, had been of little interest to buyers.

Michael Schlachter, the managing director of an investment consulting firm in Santa Monica, California called it "absolutely ridiculous" that banks may profit from speculating on toxic debt, when their pursuit of it caused the financial crisis. Schlachter said, “Some of them created this mess, and they are making a killing undoing it.” The prices for some of the securities that PPIP was to buy almost doubled between March 2009 and the end of the year, a rally that was in part caused by traders jumping in before the PPIP funds were available, according to one trader. The director of research at an investment consulting firm said that banks increased their debt holdings following the announcement of PPIP was hardly surprising. “Any time the government says, ‘We’re going to buy something in the securities market,’ they're putting out a sign that says, ‘Free money, come and get it’,” he said.

== Congress demands oversight ==
In April 2009, Congress passed legislation that included an amendment telling the Fed to reveal the names of the banks and other institutions that received $2.3 (~$3.18 trillion in 2023) trillion in taxpayer-backed bailout loans and other financial assistance. Limited information on 21,000 transactions made by the Fed between December 1, 2007 and July 21, 2010 was released on December 1, 2010 and is now being examined by Senate and House staffers. In the history of the Fed, this is the first time it has opened its books to Congress. Bailout aid was sent to banks in Mexico, Bahrain and Bavaria, billions of dollars were sent to several Japanese automobile companies, Citigroup and Morgan Stanley each received $2 trillion in loans and billions were sent to millionaires and billionaires with addresses in the Cayman Islands. Said Warren Gunnels, an aide to Senator Bernie Sanders, sponsor of the amendment calling for Fed transparency, "Our jaws are literally dropping as we're reading this." Gummels said each one of the transactions was "outrageous".

In one example highlighted by Rolling Stone, nine loans were made to Waterfall TALF Opportunity, an offshore company formed in June 2009. Two of the chief investors of Waterfall are Christy Mack and Susan Karches, who have little or no previous business experience. Mack is married to John Mack, former chairman of Morgan Stanley and Karches is the widow of Peter Karches, once the president of Morgan Stanley's investment banking division and good friends of the Macks. Waterfall was capitalized with $14.87 million, presumably from Mack and Karches. Two months after the company was established, the Fed gave them low-interest TALF loans totaling $220 million. The way TALF loans were set up, 100 percent of any profit is retained by the borrower, but the Fed and the Treasury absorb any losses. The Fed and the Treasury are funded by taxpayers. Waterfall used the $220 million TALF loans to buy securities, including a large pool of commercial mortgages managed by Credit Suisse, a company once headed by Mack's husband. As of autumn 2010, about 68 percent, some $150 million, had not yet been paid back.

The Fed refuses to provide any information on how it priced individual securities bought with TALF funds. It only provides lump sums of what was spent on a block of securities, but without indication of how many units were bought, making analysis of TALF impossible. The public has no way of knowing how much Waterfall earned on the securities it bought, although the Fed values them at $253.6 million. Securities lawyer and whistleblower Gary J. Aguirre says the pricing information is essential to validating the Fed's role in TALF, to judge how the taxpayers' funds were used. Senator Chuck Grassley has requested detailed information from Waterfall about its transactions and Sanders has asked Federal Reserve chief Ben Bernanke for more detailed information on loans made to Waterfall, former Miami Dolphins owner H. Wayne Huizenga and John Paulson, a hedge fund manager.

== See also ==
- H.R. 1424
- Mark Pittman – filed Freedom of Information Act request leading to release of Fed transactions in December 2010
