= Private sector involvement =

Cut in the value of private sector's holdings of debt

In the context of sovereign debt crisis, private sector involvement (PSI) is, broadly speaking, the forced contribution of private sector creditors to a financial crisis resolution process, and, specifically, to the private sector incurring outright reductions ("haircuts") on the value of its debt holdings.

== History ==
The term "private sector involvement" was introduced in the late 1990s in the context of the discussions on bond restructurings and capital account crises.

Previously, the term used to broadly denote any kind of private-sector participation in an existing government program, such as, for example, family planning, or health care. Since then, it has come to signify specifically the private sector's participation in the losses taken in cases of sovereign debt write downs.

== Justification ==
The private sector involvement covers measures such as the rescheduling, re-profiling, and restructuring of the state-debt holdings of private creditors, in the context of the resolution of a sovereign debt crisis. According to the International Monetary Fund, the measures of the private sector involvement process are appropriate in order to "have the burden of crisis resolution shared equitably with the [state] sector," as well as to "strengthen market discipline."

== Implications ==
ECB Executive Board member Lorenzo Bini Smaghi warned in 2011 that the enforcement of private sector involvement in resolving a financial crisis inside the Eurozone would incur "a series of problems": The taxpayers of the creditor countries would suffer in any case; patient investors, who have stuck to their investment, would be punished; the measure would destabilize the financial markets of the Eurozone by creating incentives for short-term speculative behavior; and it would delay the return of the debtor nation to the markets since market participants would be unwilling to start reinvesting in the country for a long period. This, Smaghi stated, would oblige the state sector to eventually increase its financial contribution.

== Context ==
Although the term used to denote any kind of private-sector participation in an existing government program, such as, for example, family planning, or health care, it has come to signify the private sector's participation in the losses taken in cases of sovereign debt write downs, and, more specifically, "any kind of...contributions of the private sector in the context of sovereign financial distress."

In the view of the International Monetary Fund, private sector involvement "in the resolution of financial crises is appropriate in order to have the burden of crisis resolution shared equitably with the official sector, strengthen market discipline, and, in the process, increase the efficiency of international capital markets and the ability of emerging market borrowers to protect themselves against volatility and contagion." The Fund claims that "a broad consensus has emerged among IMF member countries on the need to seek PSI in the resolution of crises." According to William R. Cline, “'PSI' has been the 1990s equivalent of 'bailing in the banks' in the 1980s."

== Greek sovereign-debt crisis ==
The most prominent case of PSI occurred in the process of the sovereign-debt restructuring of Greece, after a significant haircut (Note: "Haircut: A reduction in the face value of a troubled borrower's debts (BBC, 2015); a reduction of the amount that will be repaid to creditors (CNBC, 2015)) of it was agreed, in early 2012. The so-called "world's biggest debt-restructuring deal in history" affecting some €206bn of bonds, occurred in February 2012, when the Eurogroup finalized a second bailout package for Greece.

EU member-states agreed to a new €100 billion loan and a retroactive lowering of the bailout interest rates, while the International Monetary Fund would provide "a significant contribution" to that loan. Part of that deal was the agreement for private-sector involvement (PSI), whereby private investors were asked to accept to write off 53.5% of the face value of the Greek governmental bonds they're holding, the equivalent to an overall loss of around 75%.

If not enough private-sector bondholders were to agree to participate in the bond swap per the PSI requirement, the Greek government threatened to retroactively introduce a collective action clause to enforce participation. Eventually, private-sector involvement reached 83,5% of Greek bond holders. The Bank of Greece, in its 2011–12 report, commented that "the successful completion of the PSI, creates a new operating framework for the Greek economy in the years ahead."

The PSI was proclaimed a "great success", justified as providing the Greek economy with breathing space, although it hit the value of Greek holders of debt paper, as well as the reserves of Greek pension funds, most severely penalizing small private bondholders (i.e. private individuals holding less than 100k face value), whose losses were not even recognized for a tax deferral. (The law 4046/2012, article 3, paragraph 5, only recognized losses of corporations for tax write-offs).

At the same time, Greek sovereign bonds held by the ECB and other EU central banks as a result of the SMP Programme (and ANFAs operations) were excluded from the PSI step through a secretly agreed swap agreement between the ECB and the Hellenic Republic in February 2012. During the following years, Eurosystem central banks were subsequently paid back at face value, generating a substantial 18 billion euros of profits, which were partly retroceded to the Greek government.

== Legal aspects ==
Certain official measures executed during Greece's state debt restructuring process and the subsequent private sector involvement were not covered by existing ISDA provisions for CDS contracts, as the International Monetary Fund conceded.

Therefore, according to the IMF, the typically expected credit event was not officially triggered, the negative contingencies to private holders of state debt were increased, while the credibility of the sovereign-CDS market was undermined. The measures undertaken included the "persuasion" (Note: Quotation marks in the original.) of certain Greek debt-holders to accept large haircuts under a supposedly “voluntary PSI" agreement. Accordingly, Greece achieved a "very high creditor participation" of 97 percent of debt held, despite the restructuring being preemptive and, as assessed by the IMF, having a "very large" target of a 70 percent haircut of the bonds' face value. (Note: In terms of net present value.)

== See also ==
- Bailout
- European sovereign-debt crisis: List of acronyms
