= Argentine debt restructuring =

Process following Argentina's Great Depression

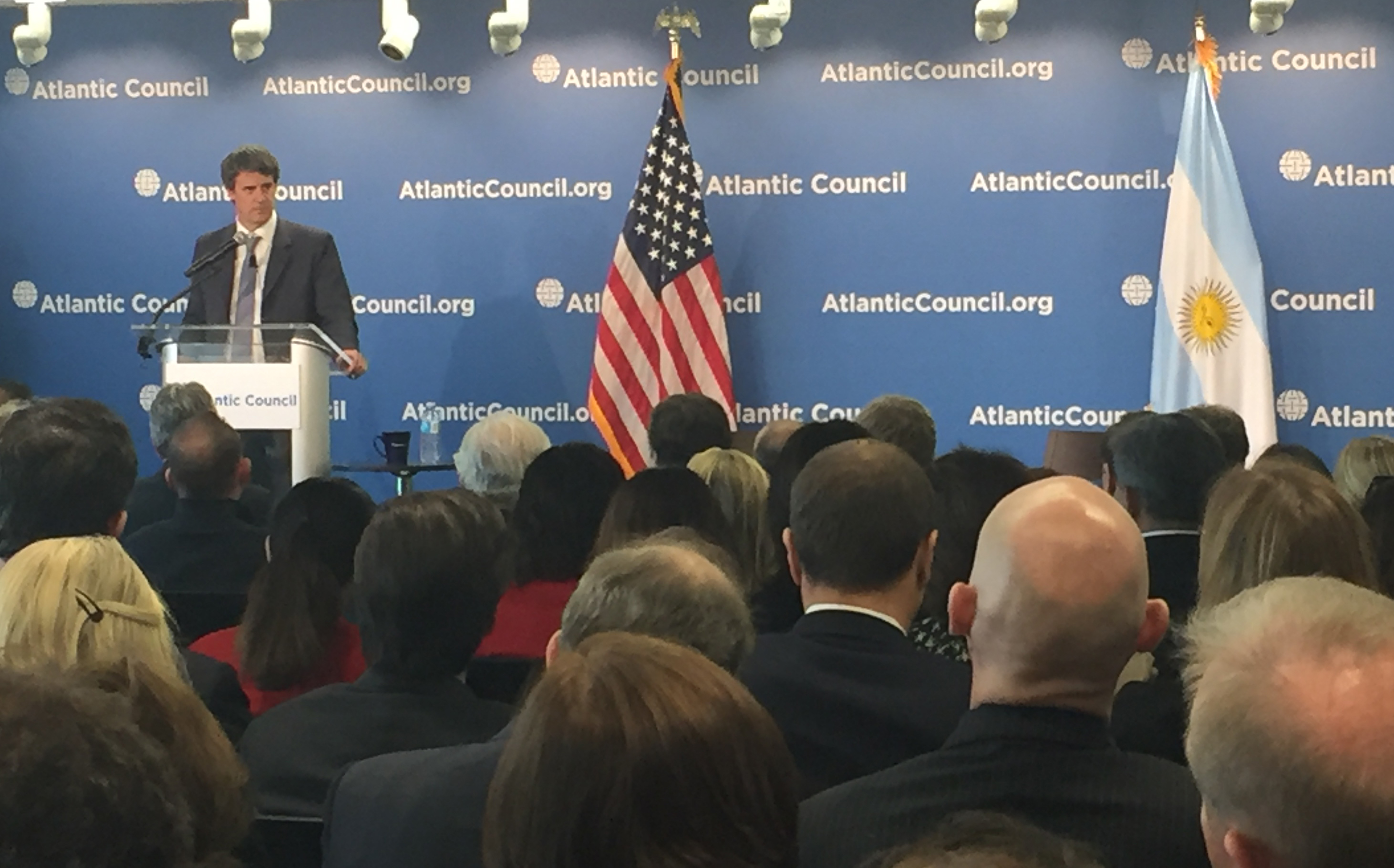
Minister Alfonso Prat-Gay takes part in meetings with the IMF and the World Bank, shortly after the end of the default.

The Argentine debt restructuring is a process of debt restructuring by Argentina that began on January 14, 2005, and allowed it to resume payment on 76% of the US$82 billion in sovereign bonds that defaulted in 2001 at the depth of the worst economic crisis in the nation's history. A second debt restructuring in 2010 brought the percentage of bonds under some form of repayment to 93%, though ongoing disputes with holdouts remained. Bondholders who participated in the restructuring settled for repayments of around 30% of face value and deferred payment terms, as well as warrants that paid investors based on annual economic growth as part of the same offer, and began to be paid punctually; the value of their nearly worthless bonds also began to rise. The remaining 7% of bondholders were later repaid 25% less than they were demanding, after centre-right and US-aligned leader Mauricio Macri came to power in 2015.

As part of the restructuring process, Argentina drafted agreements in which repayments would be handled through a New York corporation and governed by United States law. The holdout bondholders found themselves unable to seize Argentine sovereign assets in settlement, but realized that Argentina had omitted to provide for holdout situations and had instead deemed all bonds repayable on pari passu (equal) terms that prevented preferential treatment among bondholders. The holdout bondholders therefore sought, and won, an injunction in 2012 that prohibited Argentina from repaying the 93% of bonds that had been renegotiated, unless they simultaneously paid the 7% holdouts their full amount due as well. Together with the agreement's rights upon future offers ("RUFO") clause, this created a deadlock in which the 93% of renegotiated bondholders could not be paid without paying the 7% holdouts, but any payment to the holdouts would potentially (according to Argentina) trigger the 93% being due repayment at full value too; a sum of around $100 billion that Argentina could not afford. The courts ruled that as Argentina had itself drafted the agreement, and chosen the terms it wished to propose, it could not now claim the terms were unreasonable or unfair, and that this could not be worked around by asserting sovereign status since the injunction did not affect sovereign assets, but simply ruled that Argentina must not give preferential treatment of any group of bondholders over any other group when making repayments.

Subsequently, though Argentina wanted to repay some creditors, the judgment prevented Argentina from doing so, because being forced to repay all creditors, including the holdouts, would have totaled around $100 billion. The country was therefore categorized as being in selective default by Standard & Poor's and in restricted default by Fitch. The ruling affected New York law Argentine bonds; Argentine bonds issued under Buenos Aires and European law were not affected.

Proposed solutions include seeking waivers of the RUFO clause from bondholders, or waiting for the RUFO clause to expire at the end of 2014. The dilemma raised concerns internationally about the ability of a small minority to forestall an otherwise-agreed debt restructuring of an insolvent country, and the ruling that led to it was criticized.

Although the media widely reported that the default ended with payments to the principal bondholders in early 2016, during the presidency of Mauricio Macri, several hundred million dollars in outstanding defaulted bonds remained unpaid, which resulted in continuation of litigation. In November 2016 Argentina announced that it had settled with additional creditors for US$475 million.

Argentina defaulted again on May 22, 2020, by failing to pay $500 million on its due date to its creditors. Negotiations for the restructuring of $66 billion of its debt continue.

== Overview ==
=== Argentine financial crisis ===
Around 1998 to 2002, Argentina's economy went into severe recession. On December 26, 2001, Argentina defaulted on a total of US$93 billion of its external debt; of around $81.8 billion in bonds that were defaulted, 51% were issued during this three-year period. Foreign investment fled the country, and capital flow toward Argentina ceased almost completely from 2001 to 2003 (though it later recovered). The currency exchange rate (formerly a fixed 1-to-1 parity between the Argentine peso and the U.S. dollar) was floated, and the peso devalued quickly to nearly 4-to-1, producing a sudden rise in inflation to over 40% and a fall in real GDP of 11% in 2002.

Large-scale debt restructuring was needed urgently, since the high-interest bonds had become unpayable. The Argentine government met severe challenges trying to refinance its debt, however. Creditors (many of them private citizens in Spain, Italy, Germany, Japan, the United States, and other countries, who had invested their savings and retirement pensions in debt bonds) denounced the default; this included bondholders from Argentina itself, estimated to compose about a fourth of affected bondholders.

Economic recovery eventually allowed Argentina to offer large-scale debt swaps in 2005 and 2010; the first brought 76% of bonds out of default and the second, 91.3%. The terms of the debt exchanges were not accepted by all private bondholders; the holders of around 7% of the defaulted bonds—known as "holdouts"—continued to seek full repayment. The IMF initially lobbied for the holdouts until Argentina's lump-sum repayment to the IMF in January 2006. Individual creditors worldwide, who represented about one third of this group, mobilized to seek repayment following the default. Among the most prominent were Task Force Argentina, an Italian retail bondholder association; and Mark Botsford, a private U.S. retail bondholder; and Kenneth Dart, who unsuccessfully sued in 2003 to be paid $724 million for bonds purchased in 2001 for $120 million. Dart renounced his U.S. citizenship in 1994 for tax avoidance purposes, and his interests in Argentina became the focus of tax evasion charges in 2013. Italian nationals had become the largest group of foreign retail investors in Argentine bonds when during the 1990s, banks in their country purchased $14 billion in bonds and then resold them to nearly half a million investors; the vast majority rejected the first swap but accepted the second.

=== Background and holdout problem ===
Upon default, Argentina's bondholders sued to be repaid 100% of their bonds' face value. Among the bondholders were vulture funds, who had speculatively acquired US$1.3 billion of the bonds' total value on the secondary market for cents on the dollar after the 2001 default. Vulture funds also owned a large quantity of credit default swaps (CDS) against Argentine bonds. This created a further incentive to not only trigger a default against Argentina; but also to undermine the value of the bonds themselves, as the CDS would pay out at a higher rate if the defaulted bonds decline to extremely low values.

The vulture funds held out for payment in full via litigation (hence their common description as "holdout" bondholders, or "holdouts"). Their legal tactics included seeking injunctions to attach future payments to other bondholders by way of forcing Argentina to settle. A similar strategy had been successfully pursued previously by vulture funds against Peru and a number of African nations, as well as against corporations in the United States itself, such as Delphi Automotive, which was forced to pay Paul Singer's Elliott Management Corporation a return of over 3,000% on corporate bonds defaulted during the 2008 recession. NML Capital Limited, the Cayman Islands-based principal vulture funds in this dispute, is also owned by Singer. NML paid $49 million in the secondary market for bonds worth $832 million by 2014. Its lobbying group, American Task Force Argentina, is the most prominent and best financed opponent of Argentine bond restructuring efforts, spending over $7 million lobbying U.S. Congressmen and becoming the top campaign contributor to a number of these; the most prominent, former Western Hemisphere Subcommittee Chair Connie Mack IV (R-FL), became the main sponsor of a bill in 2012 designed to force Argentina to pay NML nearly $2 billion before losing his Senate bid that year. Their lobbying campaign also extends to Argentina, where NML Capital finances an NGO led by Laura Alonso, a Congresswoman affiliated with the right-wing PRO party.

In August 2013, the Government of Argentina lost a U.S. appeals court case and was told it had to repay the full face value amount to these holdouts. Courts in Europe have backed Argentina on the basis of the equal terms clause, however. A third debt restructuring offer to remaining holdouts on similar terms to the 2010 swap was announced on August 27, 2013. However, meeting vulture funds' full face-value demands is problematic for Argentina, because although bonds held by vulture funds are a small share of the total (1.6%), such a settlement would lead to lawsuits from other bondholders demanding to be paid on similar terms under the agreement's "rights upon future offers" (RUFO) clause, effectively unwinding the settlement by allowing all bondholders payment in full, and creating an unaffordable liability of up to $120 billion more than at present.

As a result, Argentina has still not been able to raise finance on the international debt markets for fear that any money raised would be impounded by holdout lawsuits; their country risk borrowing cost premiums remain over 10%, much higher than comparable countries. Consequently, Argentina has been paying debt from central bank reserves, has banned most retail purchases of dollars, limited imports, and ordered companies to repatriate money held abroad. Nevertheless, between 2003 and 2012 Argentina met debt service payments totaling $173.7 billion, of which 81.5 billion was collected by bondholders, 51.2 billion by multilateral lenders such as the IMF and World Bank, and 41 billion by Argentine government agencies. Public external debt denominated in foreign currencies (mainly in dollars and euros) accordingly fell from 150% of GDP in 2002 to 8.3% in 2013.

== Debt restructuring history ==
=== Restructuring (2005) ===
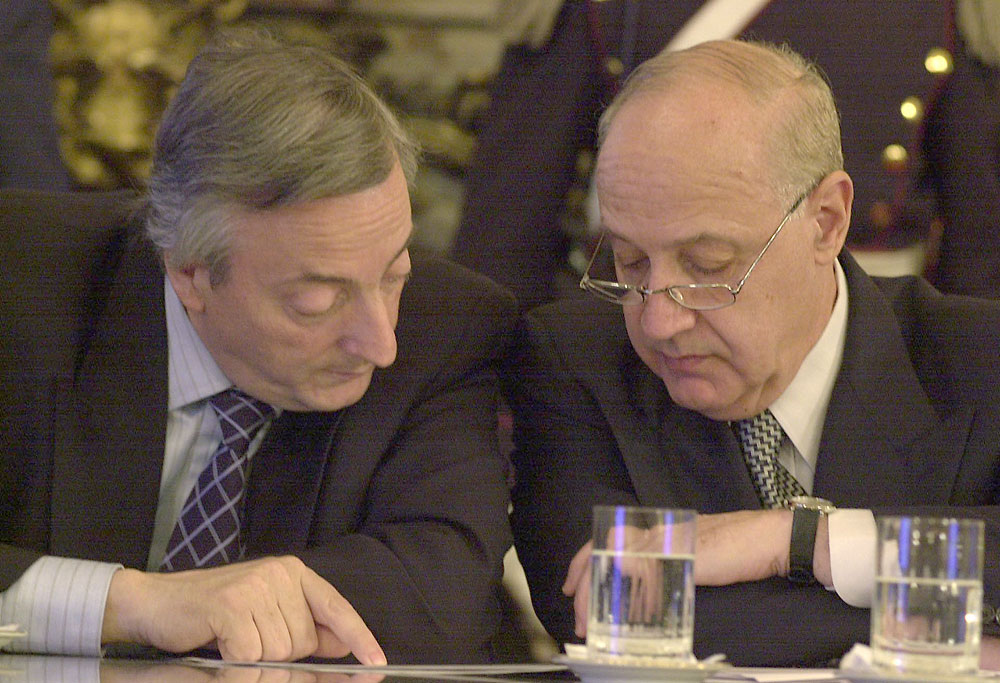
President Néstor Kirchner and Economy Minister Roberto Lavagna, who presented the first debt restructuring offer in 2005

In 2001, Argentina defaulted on its foreign debt. In January 2005, the Argentine government offered the first debt restructuring to affected bondholders; nearly 76% of the defaulted bonds (US$62.5 billion) were thus exchanged and brought out of default. The exchange offered longer term par, quasi-par, and discount bonds—the latter with a much lower nominal value (25–35% of the original). The majority of the Argentine bond market thereafter became based on GDP-linked bonds, and investors, both foreign and domestic, netted record yields amid renewed growth. One of the largest single investors in Argentine bonds following these developments was Venezuela, which bought a total of more than $5 billion in restructured Argentine bonds from 2005 to 2007. Between 2001 and 2006, Venezuela was the largest single buyer of Argentina's debt.

In 2005 and 2006, Banco Occidental de Descuento and Fondo Común, owned by Venezuelan bankers Victor Vargas Irausquin and Victor Gill Ramirez respectively, bought most of Argentina's outstanding bonds and resold them on to the market. The banks bought $100 million worth of Argentine bonds and resold the bonds for a profit of approximately $17 million. People who criticize Vargas have said that he made a $1 billion "backroom deal" with swaps of Argentine bonds as a sign of his friendship with Chavez. The Financial Times interviewed financial analysts in the United States who said that the banks profited from the resale of the bonds; the Venezuelan government did not profit.

Bondholders who had accepted the 2005 swap (three out of four did so) saw the value of their bonds rise 90% by 2012, and these continued to rise strongly during 2013.

=== IMF repayment ===
During the restructuring process, the International Monetary Fund was considered a "privileged creditor", that is, all debt was recognized and paid in full. During 2005 Argentina shifted from a policy of constant negotiation and refinancing with the IMF to payment in full, taking advantage of a large and growing fiscal surplus due to rising commodity prices and economic output, with the acknowledged intention of gaining financial independence from the IMF.

President Néstor Kirchner on December 15, 2005, announced his intention of liquidating all the remaining debt to the IMF, in a single payment of US$9.81 billion, initially planned to take place before the end of the year (a similar move had been announced by Brazil two days before, and it is understood that the two measures were to be coordinated).

Argentina under the Kirchner administration had already reduced its debt to the IMF from $15.5 billion in 2003 to $10.5 billion at the time of this announcement. The last and largest remaining share of the IMF debt, about $9.5 billion, was paid on January 3, 2006. The debt was in fact denominated in special drawing rights (SDR; a unit employed by the IMF and calculated over a basket of currencies). The Argentine Central Bank called on the Bank for International Settlements in Basel, Switzerland, where a part of its currency reserves were deposited, to act as its agent. The BIS bought 3.78 billion SDR (equivalent to about $5.4 billion) from 16 central banks and ordered their transfer to the IMF. The rest (2.874 billion SDR or $4.1 billion) was transferred from Argentina's account in the IMF, deposited in the U.S. Federal Reserve.

The payment served to cancel the debt installments that were to be paid in 2006 ($5.1 billion), 2007 ($4.6 billion), and 2008 ($432 million). This disbursement represented 8.8% of the total Argentine public debt and decreased the Central Bank's reserves by one third (from $28 billion to $18.6 billion). According to the official announcement, it also saved about a billion dollars in interest, though the actual savings amounted to $842 million (since the reserves that were in the BIS were until then receiving interest payments). One of the largest single investors in Argentine bonds following these Venezuela bought a total of more than $5 billion in restructured Argentine bonds from 2005 to 2007.

The initial announcement was made in a surprise press conference. President Kirchner said that, with this payment, "we bury an ignominious past of eternal, infinite indebtment." Many of those present later called the decision "historic". The head of the IMF, Rodrigo Rato, saluted it, though remarking that Argentina "faces important challenges ahead". United States Secretary of the Treasury John W. Snow said that this move "shows good faith" on the part of the Argentine government. Nobel Economics Prize laureate Joseph Stiglitz repeatedly criticized the IMF and supported the Argentine strategies on the debt restructuring, but opposed the disindebtment policy, suggesting instead that the IMF should receive the same treatment as the other creditors. Local criticism of the IMF debt paydown centered around the cost, which made funds unavailable for productive purposes within Argentina or to come to terms with outstanding creditors; and second, that the government traded cheap IMF credits for new emissions of public debt at much higher interest rates. Following the initial surprise and mixed reactions local markets rallied, with the MERVAL index growing more in January 2006 than in all of 2005.

The Ministry of Economy reported in June 2005 that the total official Argentine public debt was down by $63.5 billion from the first semester to $126.5 billion as a result of the restructuring process; of this, 46% was denominated in dollars, 36% in pesos, and 11% in euros and other currencies. Due to the full payment of the IMF debt and several other adjustments, as of January 2006 the total figure decreased further to $124.3 billion; bonds not exchanged in 2005 accounted for $23.4 billion, of which 12.7 billion were already overdue. The Central Bank's reserves surpassed their pre-payment levels on September 27, 2006.

A similar agreement was reached eight years later with the Paris Club of creditor nations (the last remaining Argentine debt still in default besides bonds held by holdouts) on debt repayment totaling $9 billion including penalties and interest.

=== Second debt swap: debt exchange reopens (2010) ===
On April 15, 2010, the debt exchange was re-opened to bondholders who rejected the 2005 swap; 67% of these latter accepted the swap, leaving 7% as holdouts. Holdouts continued to put pressure on the government by attempting to seize Argentine assets abroad, and by suing to attach future Argentine payments on restructured debt to receive better treatment than cooperating creditors.

A total of approximately US$12.86 billion of eligible debt was tendered into the exchange launched in April 2010; this represented 69.5% of outstanding bonds still held by holdouts. A total of 152 types of bonds in seven different currencies under eight distinct jurisdictions were issued during the two debt exchanges. The 2010 re-opening thus brought the total amount of debt restructured to 92.6% (the original 2005 debt exchange restructured 76.2% of Argentine government debt in default since 2001). The final settlement of the 2010 debt exchange took place on August 11, for bondholders that did not participate in the early tranche that closed on May 14 and settled on May 17.

== Holdout bondholders ==
Although around 93% of bondholders accepted reduced repayments (typically being repaid only 30% of the face value of bonds), a minority owning around 7% of the debt (US$4 billion), mostly hedge funds and vulture funds, continued to argue in court that they were due repayment in full, and held out for full repayment, eventually winning their case.

NML Capital Limited, a Cayman Islands-based offshore unit of Paul Singer's Elliott Management Corporation, purchased many holdings in 2008, paying an estimated $49 million for one series of bonds whose face value was over $220 million; with the subsequent boom in Argentine bond values, this face value grew to $832 million by 2014. They in turn established the American Task Force Argentina lobbying group against Argentine bond restructuring efforts, and sued to enjoin Argentina's ongoing payments to the bondholders who had participated in the earlier restructurings.

=== Holdout parties win the right to be repaid in full ===
During the 2000s NML Capital's lawyers initially obtained several large judgments against Argentina, all of which were affirmed on appeal. These rulings found that the holdout bondholders in the case were entitled to be repaid the full face value of the bonds they held, rather than alternative amounts such as the reduced settlements negotiated in 2005 and 2010, or the amounts they had purchased the bonds for.

After defaulting, Argentina continued to pay its renegotiated bondholders, but not the holdout bondholders who had rejected settlement. As Argentina refused to pay the holdout creditors at full value, the holdouts initially resorted to lawsuits to seize Argentine government assets abroad – notably central bank deposits in the Federal Reserve Bank of New York, the presidential airplane, and the ARA Libertad. The Libertad, an Argentine Navy training frigate, was arrested (though not seized) at the behest of NML Capital for ten weeks in late 2012 in the port of Tema, Ghana, until the International Tribunal for the Law of the Sea ruled unanimously that it be released. Eventually this approach proved fruitless. The holdout bondholders soon discovered that due to a number of sovereign immunity laws, it was impossible to actually enforce their judgments by seizing the handful of Argentine assets still within the reach of U.S. jurisdiction.

In a lawsuit filed by NML, the lower UK courts found that Argentina had state immunity. Before 2011, Elliott successfully appealed the case to the UK Supreme Court, which ruled that Elliott had the right to attempt to seize Argentine property in the United Kingdom.

=== Holdout parties win the right to have "equal payment" terms enforced ===
The basis of the holdout bondholders' next approach arose from oversights on Argentina's part, due to both its economic history and partly from the legal wording chosen by Argentina's government.

Because Argentina had been historically so unstable, it would have been difficult for it to solicit investors to buy bonds in Buenos Aires under Argentine jurisdiction, as few external investors trusted Argentina courts to enforce bonds against their own government. This consideration led Argentina to transfer the issue of bonds to New York, under United States law, on April 20, 1976, as were most subsequent bond issues. The bonds were therefore issued under a special kind of bond contract, a "Fiscal Agency Agreement" that was drafted by Argentina's U.S. attorneys under the law of the state of New York. The FAA stipulated that the repayments on the bonds were to be made by Argentina through a trustee, The Bank of New York Mellon, which meant that the U.S. courts did have jurisdiction over that party to issue injunctive relief.

In the Fiscal Agency Agreement, Argentina's attorneys included a boilerplate pari passu clause, but neglected to include a collective action clause. Pari passu is a term generally used to signify equal priority or treatment, and a collective action clause would have obligated any holdouts to accept the generally offered terms if enough other bondholders agreed to accept them. As a result, the holdouts realized that while Argentina could not force the holdouts to accept the terms in the 2005 or 2010 restructurings, NML could use the pari passu clause to force Argentina to choose between paying all its bondholders (including NML) or none of them.

NML Capital therefore sued Argentina in the U.S. District Court for the Southern District of New York (i.e., a federal trial court) by invoking that court's diversity jurisdiction as well as forum selection and choice of law clauses in the Fiscal Agency Agreement itself.

==== Pari passu litigation case ====
Federal district judge Thomas P. Griesa was assigned to hear the case. The crucial expression pari passu had not previously been interpreted in any published decision by the courts of the state of New York, but there is no way in U.S. federal civil procedure for a federal district court to directly transfer a case to state court if it had not originally started there. (By way of contrast, if NML Capital had sued Argentina in a New York state court, Argentina would have had the option to "remove" the case to federal court.) Instead, the district court was required by Erie Railroad Co. v. Tompkins (1938) to make an "Erie guess" as to how a New York state trial court would interpret that clause by applying general principles of contract law in the state of New York as articulated in the published decisions of the New York Court of Appeals and the New York Supreme Court, Appellate Division. The district court ruled in NML Capital's favor and issued broad permanent injunctions against Argentina and the bond trustee. The U.S. Court of Appeals for the Second Circuit (the federal appellate court with jurisdiction over New York) in turn affirmed the district court's interpretation, but did not exercise its optional right to certify that specific issue to the New York Court of Appeals for a ruling on New York state law.

According to the Second Circuit's opinion issued on October 26, 2012 (signed by senior circuit judge Barrington Daniels Parker, Jr.), Paragraph 1(c) of the 1994 version of Argentina's Fiscal Agency Agreement was as follows:

The Securities will constitute ... direct, unconditional, unsecured and unsubordinated obligations of the Republic and shall at all times rank pari passu without any preference among themselves. The payment obligations of the Republic under the Securities shall at all times rank at least equally with all its other present and future unsecured and unsubordinated External Indebtedness.

The Second Circuit interpreted this clause under New York law and concluded "that in pairing the two sentences of its Pari Passu Clause, the FAA manifested an intention to protect bondholders from more than just formal subordination ... the two sentences ... protect against different forms of discrimination: the issuance of other superior debt (first sentence) and the giving of priority to other payment obligations (second sentence)." Argentina had argued the entire clause was intended to protect only against the first type of discrimination; the Second Circuit held that Argentina's approach was invalid because it ignored the critical differences in wording between the two sentences, treated the second sentence as redundant, and in turn violated New York's rule that "a contract should not be interpreted in such a way as would leave one of its provisions substantially without force or effect." Thus, the Second Circuit affirmed the trial court's decision that Argentina could either pay all its bondholders or none, but could not pay only those who cooperated with the 2005 and 2010 restructurings and ignore the rest.

Thus in 2012 (affirmed on appeal 2013), the courts ruled that paying the settled bondholders but not the holdouts was a breach of Argentina's agreement and discriminated against the holdout bondholders.

Furthermore, the Second Circuit held that the trial court's injunctions did not violate Argentina's sovereign immunity because they merely enforced the prohibition against both formal and informal subordination of any part of the debt to any other debt: "They do not attach, arrest, or execute upon any property ... the Injunctions do not require Argentina to pay any bondholder any amount of money; nor do they limit the other uses to which Argentina may put its fiscal reserves. In other words, the Injunctions do not transfer any dominion or control over sovereign property to the court."

As of February 2013, after further decisions by the district court, the case came again before the Second Circuit. The decision of the appeals court was adverse and a motion for rehearing by a full panel was denied on March 26.

On August 23, 2013, the Second Circuit (in another opinion also signed by Judge Parker) affirmed the lower court's latest ruling clarifying the scope of the permanent injunctions. The court implied at the start of its opinion that since Argentina had taken a calculated risk to enjoy the benefit of New York law (i.e., a lower interest rate), it now had to bear the burden of New York law as well: "In order to enhance the marketability of the bonds, Argentina made a series of promises to the purchasers." Among those promises in the 1994 Fiscal Agency Agreement were the pari passu clause, the aforementioned forum selection and choice-of-law clauses expressly referencing New York, as well as a promise of the free transferability of the bonds to any transferee, regardless of whether that transferee was a "university endowment, a so-called 'vulture fund,' or a widow or an orphan." In other words, as the drafter of the Fiscal Agency Agreement, Argentina could have easily avoided the situation it found itself in by writing a different pari passu clause, omitting the transferability clause, including anti-assignment clauses (e.g., a clause providing that assignees could only recover the amount actually paid rather than face value of the debt), or writing the contract under the law of a different jurisdiction altogether, with the understanding that rational investors would have demanded higher interest rates in exchange for any of these things.

After refuting all of Argentina's arguments on the merits, the Second Circuit concluded: "We do not believe the outcome of this case threatens to steer bond issuers away from the New York marketplace ... We believe that the interest—one widely shared in the financial community—in maintaining New York's status as one of the foremost commercial centers is advanced by requiring debtors, including foreign debtors, to pay their debts."

Notably, when it came to looking at big-picture public policy issues, both Second Circuit opinions examined them only through the lens of federal procedural law (i.e., whether the injunctions were an inequitable remedy) as opposed to the substantive rules of New York state contractual law. Although New York recognizes several defenses to the enforceability of a contract like unconscionability, those defenses are usually available only to the weaker party at the time of contract formation, the party who did not write the contract (i.e., the bondholders), which explains why they were not discussed in the Second Circuit's opinions. If those defenses are unavailable (for example, because the party resisting enforcement was the one who wrote the contract), New York courts will mechanically enforce the plain language of a contract regardless of its harshness because "a court is not free to alter the contract to reflect its personal notions of fairness and equity."

The United States Supreme Court repeatedly denied Argentina's petitions for certiorari, on October 7, 2013, and June 16, 2014, meaning that it was effectively refusing to hear Argentina's appeals from the Second Circuit's decisions. The petition denied on June 16 had presented two issues: (1) sovereign immunity and (2) the Second Circuit's decision to simply affirm the trial court's Erie guess as opposed to exercising the option to certify that issue to the New York Court of Appeals.

On the same day it denied to review the injunction, the U.S. Supreme Court affirmed Judge Griesa's worldwide discovery order in Republic of Argentina v. NML Capital, Ltd.

Citigroup, which has operations in both New York and in Argentina, was caught in the middle, being required to conform to both New York and Argentine law, an international conflict of law. The trial court has granted temporary relief to the bank, allow payment of a few of the interest payments due to holdout bondholders, but the obligation to repay all holdouts as the cost of continuing to service Argentine bonds had resulted in a decision to terminate its Argentine debt servicing operation absent legal relief.

=== Argentina 2014 "selective default" ===
The pari passu ruling had a grave impact on Argentina's route out of economic difficulty. The issue perceived by Argentina was that the agreement also included a "rights upon future offers" ("RUFO") clause. The effect of such a clause was that, if a later settlement paid more, or on better terms, all existing settlements would be repaid on the improved terms. This was intended to reassure bondholders that it was safe to settle early, and reduce the incentive to hold out for a better later offer.

As a result of the earlier rulings for the holdout bondholders, Argentina now faced a situation whereby:

1. The 7% of bonds held by the "Holdout" bondholders had to be paid at full face value, whereas the other 93% had agreed to be repaid around 30% of the bonds' face value;
2. The 93% of renegotiated bonds could not have repayments made without also making repayments (on a larger scale) to the 7% of holdouts;
3. Any repayments to the holdouts related to full face value would potentially trigger all earlier bondholders being entitled to repayments at full face value as well, effectively unwinding the entire intent of the renegotiations of 2000–2010, and creating an extra liability of $100 billion that Argentina could not afford to incur.

The U.S. judicial pari passu ruling therefore forced Argentina to miss the scheduled bond payments being managed from New York, as from July 30, 2014 (bonds issued under Argentine law (paid through Citibank Argentina) and bonds issued under European Law (paid through Euroclear Bank and Clearstream Banking SA), were not affected.). This in turn caused Argentina to be declared in selective default by Standard & Poor's and in restricted default by Fitch, meaning that some Argentine bondholders were receiving payment while others now were not.

=== Responses to the ruling and 2014 default ===
==== By Argentina ====
President Cristina Fernández de Kirchner stated after the latter denial of certiorari that her country had an obligation to pay its creditors, but not to become the victims of "extortion" by "speculators"; even if Argentina cannot use the U.S. financial system to do so, she said, teams of experts are working on ways to avoid such a default and keep Argentina's promises. The expiration of Rights Upon Future Offers (RUFO) in December 2014 will preclude other bondholders from suing for better terms should the Argentine Government and the vulture funds settle, making such a settlement all the more likely after that date should the dispute continue.

===== International Court of Justice case =====
In August 2014, Argentina filed a case at the International Court of Justice, alleging that through its court system's decision, the United States had "violat[ed] its sovereign immunity" and breached "[the] obligation not to use or encourage measures of economic and political action to force the sovereign will of another State", and was responsible for permitting judicial malpractice and gross incompetence in allowing two small hedge funds to trigger a needless default against most other bondholders. Information was likewise requested from the Securities and Exchange Commission concerning the possibility of securities fraud involving the bonds by plaintiffs in the case. Observers note that the United States must consent to the case being heard, which has only happened 22 times in the ICJ's 68 years of existence, and a Latin American and international law specialist at Oxford Analytica observed to media that, "From the point of view of the U.S. government, the New York court system has dealt with a contractual dispute in which the executive [branch] cannot intervene. It's a dispute governed by a contract, not by a treaty or international law".

==== By other organizations and countries ====
The decision was likewise rejected by the Organization of American States, the G-77 (133 nations), and the Council on Foreign Relations, as well as by bondholders whose payments were stopped by the Griesa court.

==== Financial responses ====
Large banks, investors, and the U.S. Treasury Department objected to the federal courts' decisions and expressed concern over losses that could be incurred by bondholders and others, as well over disruption in the bond markets. Vladimir Werning, executive director for Latin American research at JPMorgan Chase, observed that vulture funds "are trying to block the payments system" in the United States itself, something "unprecedented in the New York jurisdiction". Kevin Heine, a spokesman for Bank of New York Mellon, which handles Argentina's international bond payments, said the ruling "will create unrest in the credit markets and result in cascades of litigation, which is precisely the opposite effect that an injunction should have." The American Bankers Association agreed, noting that "permitting injunctions that preclude pre-existing obligations whenever expedient to enforce a judgment against the debtor will have significantly adverse consequences for the financial system."

A consortium of Argentine banks, led by Argentine Banking Association (Adeba) President Jorge Brito, meanwhile presented their own settlement offer on July 30, by which all vulture fund bond holdings in dispute would be purchased in installments for a total of US$1.4 billion, but the offer was refused; Citibank, JP Morgan Chase, and HSBC joined efforts to repurchase vulture fund holdings on August 1. The ISDA, of which Singer's Elliott hedge fund is one of 15 bank members, granted Singer and fellow vulture fund plaintiff Aurelius Capital CDS insurance payout of $1 billion on August 1.

== Impact of deadlocked bond repayments ==
=== Impact on Argentina ===
The dispute limited Argentina's access to foreign credit markets as well; in October 2012 Argentina's theoretical borrowing costs were 10.7%, double the average for developing countries. Although Argentina has not raised money on the money markets since the default, the state-owned oil company YPF has already placed debt in the financial markets to finance its investment program in years to come.

=== Wider implications for the financial system ===
The possibility that holdout creditors can attach future payments on restructured debt and receive better treatment than cooperating creditors distorts incentives, can derail efforts for a cooperative restructuring, and may ultimately lead to the United States no longer being viewed as a safe place to issue sovereign debt.

The Second Circuit has acknowledged that New York Judiciary Law Section 489 (descended from an 1813 statute) appears to facially prohibit "essentially all 'secondary' transactions in debt instruments where the purchaser had an intent to enforce the debt obligation through litigation", but then ruled in a 1999 decision involving Elliott Management's earlier case against Peru that the history of that section as interpreted in New York state courts revealed that it was intended only to prohibit purchases made with the sole intent of bringing a lawsuit in and of itself. That is, the New York Legislature was trying to stop attorneys or debt collectors from exploiting cost-shifting clauses in worthless promissory notes to obtain judgments for minuscule amounts (i.e., the face value of the notes) that also awarded massive costs incurred in the course of litigation. Section 489 does not apply to purchases made with the primary intent of collecting on the face value of the instrument, where litigation is merely a means to that end. The United Kingdom, however, restricted the use of its courts for suits by vulture funds against developing countries in 2011. As of 2014 70% of the world's sovereign bonds are issued in New York, and 22% in London.

According to Reuters in 2013, the case is likely to be of particular importance in cases in which the creditors are being asked to accept substantial debt and debt service reduction, though it is unclear given the special circumstances of the Elliot/NML case whether it will be broadly applicable to holdouts in other restructurings. The American Bankers Association warned that the district court's interpretation of the equal terms provision could enable a single creditor to thwart the implementation of an internationally supported restructuring plan, and thereby undermine the decades of effort the United States has expended to encourage a system of cooperative resolution of sovereign debt crises.

== Presidency of Mauricio Macri and default end (2015–2016) ==
Mauricio Macri was elected president of Argentina in November 2015. He sought to negotiate with the holdouts and end the default, in order to return to the international capital markets and benefit the national economy. In early 2016, US courts ruled that Argentina must make full payments to four "holdout bondholders" (NML, Aurelius Capital Management, Davidson Kempner Capital Management, and Bracebridge Capital) by February 29. Argentina made an offer to pay $6.5 billion to settle lawsuits on February 5, requesting that the prior ruling on payments be lifted. Daniel Pollack announced in February 2016 that Argentina had reached an agreement with Paul Singer. The deal would still need to be ratified by the Argentine Congress. The deal would only last until April 14, 2016.

Although Cambiemos, Macri's political coalition, did not have a majority at either house of the Congress, the bill was approved by both of them in March. Many Peronist legislators supported it because the province governors would also benefit from access to international credit markets. With the bill approved, Argentina faced a court hearing in New York on April 13. The court confirmed the ruling of Griesa, and allowed Argentina to pay to the bondholders of 2005, 2010 and those that were still in default. The payment will be done with a bond sale. This appeared to the media to be the end of the Argentine default, which had started in 2001.

However, nearly US$1 billion in defaulted bonds remained unpaid, which resulted in continuing though less publicised litigation. Argentina finally reported in November 2016 that it had reached agreements to pay US$475 million to settle the outstanding defaulted debt.

In January 2017, The Economist reported that the MSCI index would be considering re-accepting Argentina's shares over 2017, and on January 5, JPMorgan Chase also said it would admit Argentina into its benchmark indices early in the year. On March 6, 2017, Barron's reported that Moody's Investors Services had "raised its outlook on Argentina's credit rating to positive from stable."

A severe devaluation of the Argentine Peso caused by high inflation, an increase in the price of the US dollar at local markets, and other international factors led the country into a monetary crisis. The interest rate increased to 60%.

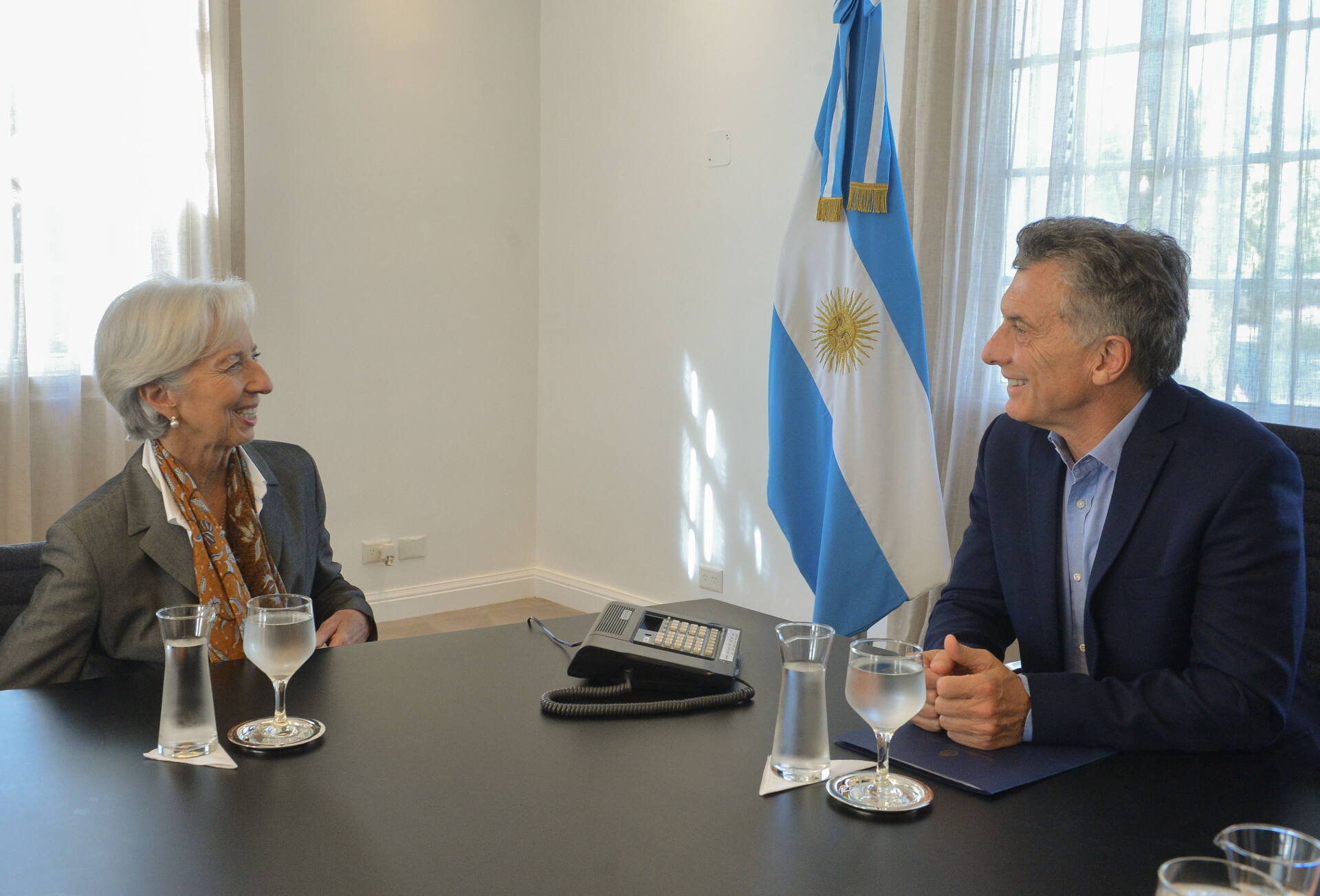
Macri negotiating the loan with Christine Lagarde, managing director of the IMF

Macri announced on May 8 that Argentina would seek a loan from the International Monetary Fund (IMF). The loan was $57bn, and the country pledged to reduce inflation and public spending.

== Presidency of Alberto Fernández and debt terms restructuring ==
Since December 2019, Alberto Fernández was seeking to restructure its US$100 billion debt with private bondholders and US$45 billion borrowed by Macri from the International Monetary Fund.

Argentina defaulted again on May 22, 2020, by failing to pay $500 million on its due date to its creditors. Negotiations for the restructuring of $66 billion of its debt continue.

On August 4, Fernández reached an accord with the biggest creditors on terms for a restructuring of $65bn in foreign bonds, after a breakthrough in talks that had at times looked close to collapse since the country's ninth debt default in May.

On September 7, S&P Global Ratings upgraded Argentina's long term sovereign-credit rating to "CCC+" from "SD" citing the end of prolonged foreign and local law foreign currency debt restructurings, effectively pulling the country out of default territory after the country successfully restructured over $100 billion in sovereign debt.

== See also ==
- Economy of Argentina
- Argentine monetary crisis
