= Holdout problem =

Economic issue of securities

In finance, a holdout problem occurs when a bond issuer is in default or nears default, and launches an exchange offer in an attempt to restructure debt held by existing bond holders. Such exchange offers typically require the consent of holders of some minimum portion of the total outstanding debt, often in excess of 90%, because, unless the terms of the bond provide otherwise, non-consenting bondholders will retain their legal right to demand repayment of their bonds at par (the full face amount). Bondholders who withhold their consent and retain their right to seek the full repayment of original bonds, may disrupt the restructuring process, creating a situation known as the holdout problem.

The contractual terms for obligating all bondholders to accept a restructuring approved by some supermajority is typically spelled out in what are known as Collective Action Clauses, or CACs. In some jurisdictions, CACs or their equivalents are required under local law, but this is not a universal practice. CACs can represent additional borrowing costs for lenders while conversely, borrowers may seek lower debt costs without CAC protection but this exposes them to holdout conditions and potential damaging and expensive litigation which in the case of post-2001 Argentina essentially locked that country out of access to conventional international financing.

The "holdouts" gamble that the restructuring will take place despite the lack of their consent, potentially leading to full repayment of their bonds, while other bondholders receive reduced payments according to the terms of the restructuring. If the restructuring does not take place, they gain nothing, but holdouts may initiate damaging litigation that results in extremely high costs in direct and indirect economic injury to the debtor.

The claims of the holdouts may be insignificant enough, and bothersome enough, that the issuer may satisfy them in whole simply not to be bothered.

Where bondholders are widely dispersed, as is often the case, it can be difficult to contact many holders. Further, many holders of small amounts of bonds have little incentive to invest the time and energy in evaluating the terms of the exchange offer. These factors represent substantial difficulties in obtaining the minimum consent levels.

== Holdout problem in sovereign debt restructuring ==
If countries face the danger of default, additional complications might occur and increase the Holdout problem:

=== National pride ===
Governments fear damages of their status as an advanced economy, which could lead to increasing sovereign bond yields. As an example, during the Eurozone crisis the former French president Nicolas Sarkozy said: “we will show that Europeans pay their debt”. Sarkozy was aiming at declining bond yields with his statement, but showed implicitly that countries want to avoid sovereign debt restructurings for reasons of their own national pride.

Sovereign debt restructuring could be tantamount to an admission of emerging market status.

=== Contagion ===
In currency unions (such as the Eurozone) the effect of complex economic relationships could possibly lead to a conflagration. A debt restructuring of numerous countries or one great country might destabilize the global banking industry.

=== Relationship between sovereign debt and private sector ===
In the majority of countries, a substantial part of sovereign bonds is likely to be held by financial institutions in the sovereign's own country (like banks, insurance companies and pension funds). Restructuring those instruments will therefore undermine the health of the domestic financial system. Even if countries are able to reduce significantly their costs of debt service, the same amount might need to be spent in bank recapitalizations.

=== Feasibility ===
Creditors left behind in a restructuring could lead to following problems:

- If there are enough of them, the financial predicates underlying the entire restructuring may be undone.
- If holdouts are subsequently paid in full, it makes the participating creditors look deprived and this leads in the next restructuring to even more holdouts.
- If holdouts are not paid after the restructuring closes, they pose an ongoing litigation and attachment threat to the debtor, e.g. Argentina’s decade-long legal fight with thousands of holders of the Argentine bonds that went into default in 2001.

== European Stability Mechanism ==
The European Stability Mechanism (ESM) has been installed in order to help out countries of the Eurozone in financial distress. In case of an ESM-approved sovereign debt restructuring, the Holdout problem might play a significant role. Following amendments to the ESM could reduce this problem:

- Ensuring that the financial support being provided by the ESM to one of its members is not diverted to the repayment of an existing debt obligation of that member that was eligible to participate in a debt restructuring but declined to do so
- Assisting the beneficiary member state in any ESM-approved restructuring of its debt by deflating the expectations of prospective holdouts that they will be able to extract a preferential recovery through the pursuit of legal remedies after the restructuring closes
- Providing a safe harbor in the Eurozone for the recipient state to hold its assets and conduct its financial affairs without fear of harassment by holdout creditors

== Recent examples ==
=== Peru ===
Successful litigations were undertaken by some holdouts in Peru (1996).

=== Argentina ===
A similar dispute between Argentina and holdouts has been ongoing since at least the 2005 Argentine debt restructuring. Bondholders that accepted the 2005 swap (two out of three did so, while accepting only about one-third of the bond value in the restructuring) saw the severely reduced value of their bonds rise 90% by 2012, and these continued to rise strongly during 2013.

An August 2013 appeals court ruling in Argentina v. NML Capital, 12-1494, determined that holdouts should be repaid the full face value, but without the losses taken by those who had accepted the 2005 and 2010 swaps at a 70%-75% discount. In October 2013 the Supreme Court affirmed the decision without comment. A second decision of the 2nd Circuit which prohibits payments to creditors who did accept the swap if holdouts are not paid was on appeal to the full panel as of October 2013. This case may also be appealed to the Supreme Court. Enforcement of the decisions is stayed pending a final Supreme Court decision. Courts in Belgium, France, and Germany have backed Argentina on the basis of the equal terms clause, however. The lack of legal certainty is U.S. courts prompted Argentine officials to propose placing the restructured bonds in question under Argentine law, while concurrently announcing a renewed bond swap offer. However, court decisions outside the US had no bearing on Argentina's debt obligations, since Argentina had sold their debt under US law.

The possibility that holdout creditors can attach future payments on restructured debt and receive better treatment than cooperating creditors distorts incentives and can derail efforts for a cooperative restructuring. It is likely to be of particular importance in cases in which the creditors are being asked to accept substantial debt and debt service reduction. However, it is unclear given the special circumstances of the Elliot case whether it will be broadly applicable to holdouts in other restructurings. The new Argentine government elected in late 2015 gave indications of its willingness to negotiate with the set of thousands of holdout creditors. The Argentine situation has increased awareness of the utility of Collective Action Clauses in preventing or reducing holdout complications in debt restructuring.

== See also ==
- Debt restructuring
- Troubled Debt Restructuring
- Vulture fund
