= Leximetrics =

Leximetrics is a field which attempts to rank the strength or weaknesses of laws, by assigning a numerical value to each type of law in a particular field. The law's numbers are then used to compare the efficacy of different legal systems, and how these numbers correlate with particular goals such as economic growth or employment.

== History ==
The term leximetrics was first coined by Robert Cooter and Tom Ginsburg, drawing on their comparative law studies. The first attempt to assign numerical values to rules in different legal systems, to evaluate their perceived strength or weakness, was made by a group of finance economists called Rafael La Porta, Florencio Lopez de Silanes, Andrei Shleifer, and Robert W. Vishny. In work that was commissioned by the World Bank, and with views consistent with the Washington Consensus, they collated information on a select number of shareholder rights. They believed they could show that the protection of shareholder rights correlated with, and probably caused, more efficient market economies. They also argued that, according to their legal origins theory, common law systems were better at protecting shareholder rights than civil law jurisdictions, on the whole. With other people involved later, these studies were extended to labour law, and constitutional law protections for property, and other issues which concerned the researchers.

La Porta, Lopez, Shleifer and Vishny's studies, although picked up by the World Bank and the International Monetary Fund, were widely criticised for failing to disclose their methodology adequately, misunderstanding the law in multiple jurisdictions, oversimplifying complex legal problems, and bias. Before long other researchers, such as those at the Cambridge Judge Business School, Centre for Business Research, led by Simon Deakin, began undertaking parallel studies. These sought to do the same work but more accurately, and usually came to the opposite conclusions. For example, it was found that when measured more accurately, and over time, common law countries were not outperformed by civil law countries in various shareholders' protection measures, and that labour law was in fact positive for economic development in most cases.

The field of work has continued to attract substantial academic interest.

== Methodology and criticism ==
A common criticism of leximetrics, particularly among the legal profession, is that it fails to capture the complexity of legal issues, and by reducing the "strength" of laws to a numerical value, may well miss the practical effects of the law. For example, as the corporate law Professor John C. Coffee has put it, put it, public enforcement of directors' duties remains necessary despite the work carried out by Rafael La Porta, Florencio Lopez de Silanes, Andrei Shleifer and Robert W. Vishny, because it is more effective. "This is a description," says Coffee, "quite at odds with LLS and V, who favor private enforcement (but do not understand it)..."

Leximetric studies usually involve researchers with limited amounts of time to spend on each country's law that they examine, the researchers may or may not be lawyers, and may or may not be acquainted with the dozens of jurisdictions they study, even if the person leading the research is themselves a highly qualified lawyer. Even then, the assessment of whether a law is strong or not depends on an independent judgement. Numbers tend to indicate an objective quality, when in fact they are all subjective assessments of the relative efficacy of a law, and open to reinterpretation. Once the aggregated data and number have been determined by the researcher, and these are correlated with data on a country's economic development, it is then also criticised that no normative conclusions can be drawn. Correlations do not mean causation, and even very close correlations in the understanding of econometrics is not the same as causation. Regression analysis which shows, for example, a country raising its minimum wage has coincided exactly with a period of economic growth would neither demonstrate that a minimum wage ought to be raised in a different country.

Defenders of the leximetrics methodology contend that although there may be many qualifications and limitations, the work can nevertheless be useful despite its abstracted nature. It is preferable to have some information and basis for comparison rather than none at all, and the only question is whether or not the work is carried out accurately or with integrity. The more transparent the researchers' choices are, the better the work is likely to be. As more data is released, other researchers can build on and perfect the work which is done.

== See also ==
- Labour law
- Corporate law
- Legal origins theory
