= SEI Investments Company =

American financial services company

- Type: Public
- Traded as: Nasdaq: SEIC; S&P 400 component
- Industry: Financial services
- Founded: 1968; 58 years ago
- Founder: Alfred P. West Jr.
- Headquarters: Oaks, Pennsylvania, United States
- Key people: Carl A. Guarino (chairman); Ryan Hicke (CEO); Alfred P. West Jr. (chairman emeritus)
- AUM: $606.4 billion (September 2026)
- Number of employees: 5,000+
- Website: www.seic.com

SEI Investments Company is an American financial services company headquartered in Oaks, Pennsylvania. The company provides financial technology, investment processing, investment operations, and asset management services to financial institutions, investment managers, financial advisers, institutional investors, and other clients. Its common stock is traded on the Nasdaq under the ticker symbol SEIC.

The company was founded in 1968 by Alfred P. West Jr. as Simulated Environments Inc.. Its original business developed from a computer-based commercial-credit simulation used to train bank loan officers. SEI subsequently expanded into investment processing, investment management, outsourced investment operations, and wealth-management technology.

As of September 30, 2026, SEI reported $606.4 billion in assets under management, $1.41 trillion in client assets under administration, and total assets managed, advised, administered, or otherwise reported on its platforms and businesses of $2.106 trillion.

== History ==
Alfred P. West Jr. founded SEI in 1968 under the name Simulated Environments Inc. West studied aerospace engineering at the Georgia Institute of Technology and later earned an MBA from the Wharton School of the University of Pennsylvania. The company's first product was a computer program designed to train loan officers by simulating a lending environment.

During the 1970s, SEI developed an automated accounting system for bank trust departments, shifting the company's focus from training simulations toward financial technology. The system evolved into TRUST 3000, a trust-accounting and investment-processing platform used by banks and trust institutions.

SEI became a public company in 1981. The company subsequently expanded beyond investment-processing technology into investment management and related financial services. In 1989, SEI began providing mutual-fund accounting and distribution services for bank-sponsored funds, and in 1992 it established a business serving independent financial advisers.

In 1994, SEI became an early investor in LSV Asset Management, an investment-management firm founded by Josef Lakonishok, Andrei Shleifer, and Robert Vishny.

SEI later developed a new processing system, initially called the Global Wealth Platform and subsequently the SEI Wealth Platform. The initial version was placed into service in 2007, and SEI continued to develop and expand the platform over subsequent years. Deployment was gradual, and TRUST 3000 remained in use alongside the newer platform; in 2020, SEI described TRUST 3000 as its legacy wealth-management platform when announcing the conversion of two clients to the SEI Wealth Platform.

In 2022, Ryan Hicke succeeded West as chief executive officer, ending West's 54-year tenure as CEO. West remained executive chairman until January 1, 2026, when he left the company's board and became chairman emeritus. Carl A. Guarino succeeded him as chairman.

In December 2025, SEI completed an investment in Stratos Wealth Holdings, a network of affiliated financial-advisory businesses. As of September 30, 2026, Stratos reported $41.7 billion in client assets. Stratos contributed $126.7 million to SEI's revenue during the first nine months of 2026.

In 2012, SEI was named in litigation arising from R. Allen Stanford's Ponzi scheme. Stanford Trust Company had contracted with SEI to provide operational services for individual retirement accounts, some of which held certificates of deposit issued by Stanford International Bank. In 2020, the United States Court of Appeals for the Fifth Circuit affirmed summary judgment in favor of SEI and its insurers.

== Business ==
SEI provides financial technology, investment processing, investment operations, and investment management services. The company serves investment managers, private banks and wealth managers, financial advisers, and institutional investors.

For investment managers, SEI provides outsourced investment operations and fund administration services. For private banks and wealth managers, the company provides investment-processing technology and operations services, including the SEI Wealth Platform. SEI also provides financial advisers with investment-management, technology, custody, and operational services, while its institutional-investor business provides investment-management and advisory services.

SEI also owns an interest in LSV Asset Management, an investment-management firm founded in 1994. SEI reports LSV separately from its other investment-management businesses.

== Headquarters ==
SEI campus in Oaks, Pennsylvania

SEI's headquarters are located on a 90-acre campus in Oaks, Pennsylvania. The campus was master-planned by the architecture firm Meyer, Scherer & Rockcastle, now MSR Design, and developed in multiple phases. Its buildings use steel framing and open interior spans designed to allow workspaces to be reconfigured.

The campus design includes movable workstations and an overhead system for power, data, and telecommunications, allowing work groups to be relocated without substantial changes to the buildings' infrastructure.

Contemporary art from the West Collection is displayed throughout SEI's headquarters. The collection was established by Alfred P. West Jr. and Paige West in 1996 and includes works by contemporary artists that are exhibited at SEI's Oaks campus and other company offices.
