= Legal origins theory =

Claims that civil law and common law shape lawmaking

The legal origins theory claims that the two main legal traditions or origins, civil law and common law, crucially shape lawmaking and dispute adjudication and have not been reformed after the initial exogenous transplantation by Europeans. Therefore, they affect economic outcomes to date. According to the evidence reported by the initial proponents of such a theory, countries that received civil law would display today less secure investor rights, stricter regulation, and more inefficient governments and courts than those that inherited common law. These differences would reflect both a stronger historical emphasis of common law on private ordering and the higher adaptability of judge-made law.

Legal origins theory became popular among economists in the late 20th century, at the same time that practitioners of comparative law were largely abandoning taxonomic classifications of legal systems.

== Colonial Transplantation and Main Structural Differences ==
While English common law originated in thirteenth century England and has then been transplanted through colonization and occupation to England’s ex-colonies (United States, Canada, Australia, and several countries in Central America, Africa and Asia), the Scandinavian common law was developed in Denmark and Sweden and the German common law sprang in Germany and Switzerland. These last four countries then exported their common law model to the respective colonies or to those jurisdictions (China, Greece, Japan, Romania, South Korea, Taiwan, Thailand, and Turkey), which were never colonized but borrowed their initial legal order from the European codes considered most advanced at the time.

Civil law instead has its roots in Roman law, was incorporated by the Napoleonic codes first and then by both the Austrian and Russian Civil codes, and has been then introduced via mainly colonization and occupation into continental Europe, the Near East, Latin America, Africa, and Indochina. Bulgaria, Ethiopia, Iran, and Kazakhstan instead purposely borrowed their initial legal order from either France, Russia, or England.

Structurally, the two legal traditions constitute a well-defined bundle of lawmaking and adjudication institutions and operate in quite different ways [Merryman 1969, p. 52, 123–127; Zweigert and Kötz 1998, p. 272]. While common law entrusts a key role to the precedents selected by appellate judges and allows more procedural discretion to lower adjudicating courts, civil law relies on legal codes designed by political representatives and bright-line adjudication rules.

== Early Empirical Evidence ==
In a series of influential papers published between 1997 and 2008, Rafael La Porta, Florencio Lopez-de-Silanes, Andrei Shleifer, and Robert Vishny exploited the exogenous assignment of these very different institutions and assumed that they have not been reformed later on to provide evidence consistent with the idea that common law is correlated with:

"(a) better investor protection, which in turn is associated with improved financial development […], (b) lighter government ownership and regulation, which are in turn associated with less corruption, better functioning labor markets, and smaller unofficial economies, and (c) less formalized and more independent judicial systems, which are in turn associated with more secure property rights and better contract enforcement."

Operationally, the "legal origins" scholars assigned the majority of countries in the world to either the English-common law, the French-civil law, or one among the German, Scandinavian, and Socialist legal traditions and then they calculated correlations between these legal origins dummies and proxies for the aforementioned economic outcomes.

== Theoretical Justification to the Putative Primacy of Common Law ==
The "legal origins" scholars suggest that common law has at least two favorable consequences. First, historical events in England and in France built into the common law a stronger emphasis on the independence of the judiciary, private ordering, and human capital. Second, judge-made law would make common law more adaptable to the contracting needs of the economy.

=== Historical Emphasis of Common Law on Private Ordering ===
Edward Glaeser and Andrei Shleifer contend that the development of a system of adjudication by lay juries in England and one of adjudication by professional judges in France were conscious choices reflecting the different political power of the English and French barons during the 12th century.

"The former were concerned about the powerful English king’s ability to interfere in adjudication and bargained for trial by local, lay juries, a right enshrined in Magna Carta. The relatively weak French crown, by contrast, was less a threat than other barons. French barons accordingly desired a centralized adjudication system controlled by royal judges who would not be easily captured by local interests."

Napoleon’s attempt to turn through its codes the judiciary into bureaucrats controlled by the State and the post-1688 Glorious Revolution success of the English judiciary in establishing its independence should have reinforced these dissimilarities, instilling at the same time into the common law a stronger emphasis on judicial independence and on private ordering. This divergence would imply that common law will always shore up markets and the civil law will always restrict markets or replace them with state command.

This analysis of the medieval European history has been criticized by Daniel Klerman and Paul Mahoney, who conclude that a system of adjudication by lay juries was initially favored in England because of low literacy levels and later enforced to place the judicial power in the hands of the crown. They argue that both French and English judiciaries had the de facto power to make law through precedent, and that French judges enjoyed a greater independence because their office could be inherited as property. Hence, the only permanent divergence between the legal orders in England and in France originated from the different fortunes of the judiciary in the aftermath of their respective revolutions.

=== Adaptability of Judge-made Law ===
The key institution differentiating the two legal traditions is the lawmaking institution, which determines the identity of the lawmaker. Common law relies on case law, whereby precedents set by appellate courts guide subsequent adjudication by courts of the same or lower standing and can be changed by appellate judges only with a costly justification effort. Civil law instead relies on statute law, which comprises legislation enacted by political representatives.

"Legal origins" scholars identify three main advantages of judge-made law compared with statute law:

1. Since overruling is costly, precedents tend to include both the deciding appellate judge’s opinion and those of the preceding appellate judges in such a way that the long-run law optimally incorporates the different opinions of all appellate judges, whereas statute law can be permanently biased by special interests.
2. Appellate judges can effectively introduce new information into the law by distinguishing the precedent.
3. Since inefficient rules tend to be appealed more often, they should be evaluated more often by appellate judges than by politicians.

== Sources ==
- Gennaioli, Nicola; Shleifer, Andrei (2007). "Overruling and the Instability of Law". Journal of Comparative Economics. 35 (2): 309–28. doi:10.1016/j.jce.2007.02.003. S2CID 7833427.
- Glaeser, Edward; Shleifer, Andrei (2002). "Legal Origins". Quarterly Journal of Economics. 117 (4): 1193–1229. doi:10.1162/003355302320935016. JSTOR 4132477.
- Klerman, Daniel; Mahoney, Paul G. (2007). "Legal Origin?". Journal of Comparative Economics. 35 (2): 278–93. doi:10.1016/j.jce.2007.03.007.
- Porta, La; Rafael; Lopez-de-Silanes, Florencio; Shleifer, Andrei; Vishny, Robert W. (1997). "Legal Determinants of External Finance". Journal of Finance. 52 (3): 1131–1150. doi:10.1111/j.1540-6261.1997.tb02727.x.
- Porta, La; Rafael; Lopez-de-Silanes, Florencio; Shleifer, Andrei (2008). "The Economic Consequences of Legal Origins". Journal of Economic Literature. 46 (2): 285–332. CiteSeerX 10.1.1.335.5384. doi:10.1257/jel.46.2.285.
- Merryman, John H., 1969. The Civil Law Tradition. Stanford University Press, Stanford.
- Miceli, Thomas J (2009). "Legal Change: Selective Litigation, Judicial Bias, and Precedent". Journal of Legal Studies. 38 (1): 157–68. doi:10.1086/587439. JSTOR 10.1086/587439. S2CID 154105516.
- Roe, Mark J., 2004. Convergence and Persistence in Corporate Governance. Cambridge University Press, Cambridge, UK.
- Rosenthal, Howard; Voeten, Erik (2007). "Measuring Legal Systems". Journal of Comparative Economics. 35 (4): 711–728. doi:10.1016/j.jce.2007.08.001.
- World Bank. 2004. Doing Business in 2004: Understanding Regulation. Oxford University Press on behalf of the World Bank, Washington, DC.
- Zweigert, Konrad, and Hein Kötz. 1998. Introduction to Comparative Law, 3rd ed. Oxford University Press, Oxford-New York.
