= Bracebridge Capital =

Largest female-managed hedge fund globally

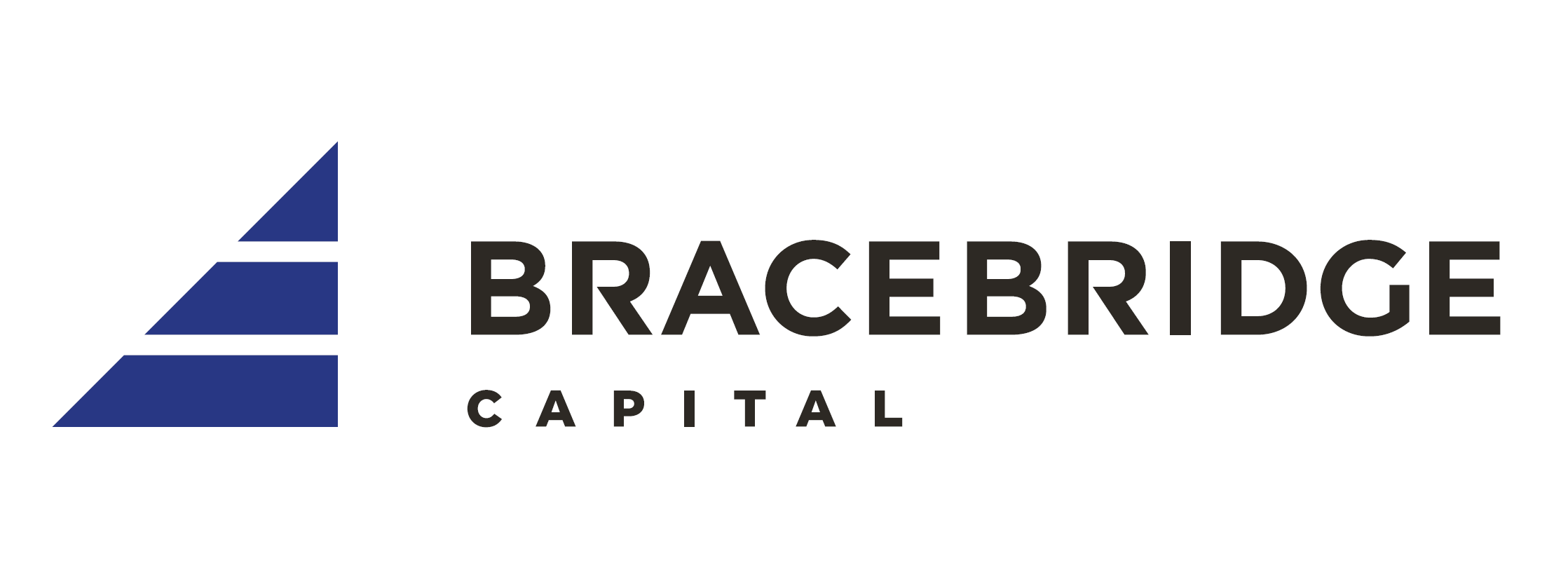
- Type: Private
- Founded: 1994
- Founder: Nancy Zimmerman; Gabriel Sunshine
- Headquarters: Boston, Massachusetts, United States
- Key people: John Spinney (COO) and (CFO); Danforth Townley (General Counsel); Scott Kudlacik (CCO)
- AUM: $12 billion (2026)
- Number of employees: 150+
- Website: www.bracebridgecapital.com

Bracebridge Capital is a Boston, Massachusetts–based investment management firm and hedge fund founded in 1994 by Nancy Zimmerman and Gabriel Sunshine. The firm manages investments for institutional clients, including university endowments such as those of Yale University and Princeton University. Bracebridge gained international attention for its role in Argentina's debt restructuring, from which it reportedly earned approximately $1.5 billion. As of 2026, the firm managed $12 billion in assets, making it one of the largest hedge funds in the world and the largest hedge fund managed by a woman, with Zimmerman serving as its chief executive officer.

== History ==
Bracebridge Capital was co-founded by Nancy Zimmerman and Gabriel Brendan Sunshine in 1994. Zimmerman is a Brown alumna, former Goldman Sachs employee, and the wife of Harvard professor Andrei Shleifer.

Sunshine is a Harvard graduate, class of 1991, and the husband of Geraldine Acuña-Sunshine, the former co-chair of the Harvard College Fund and former senior counsel to Bracebridge Capital. John Spinney is the firm's COO and CFO.

The fund had a 10% annual return from 1994 to 2016. Initially, it received $50 million from Tom Steyer's Farallon Capital and David F. Swensen, who runs Yale University's endowment. Later, Andrew K. Golden, the manager of Princeton University's endowment, also became a major investor in Bracebridge Capital. By 2012, it had $5.8 billion of assets under management.

By February 2016, it had assets of $10.3 billion, making it the largest hedge fund managed by a woman in the world. It also had more than 100 employees by February 2016.

In March 2016, it was announced that the firm would receive $1.5 billion from the Argentine debt restructuring. It was one of four hedge funds which former president Cristina Fernández de Kirchner called "vultures” and “financial terrorists."

In April 2025, Bracebridge Capital was named among the lenders providing debtor-in-possession (DIP) financing to Hooters of America during its Chapter 11 bankruptcy proceedings. According to Bloomberg, the restaurant chain filed for bankruptcy with plans to restructure approximately $300 million in asset-backed bonds tied to its franchise operations. Bracebridge contributed to a $40 million DIP loan package, which included $35 million in new capital aimed at supporting the company’s operations during the reorganization process.

In May 2025, Zimmerman spoke at the 2025 Sohn Montreal Conference about resilient market neutral strategies and the firm's portfolio construction.

In October 2025, Global Witness reported that Bracebridge Capital was involved in shaping the Tropical Forests Forever Facility, a $125 billion initiative to finance tropical forest conservation through market-based investments. The firm helped design financial structures for the initiative, which drew scrutiny from environmental groups over the role of private asset managers in global forest policy.

== See also ==
- Distressed securities
- Debtor-in-possession financing
- Chapter 11
- Vulture fund
- Corporate restructuring
