= Nancy Zimmerman =

Hedge fund founder and asset manager

Nancy G. Zimmerman
- Born: July 2, 1963 (age 63); Skokie, Illinois, U.S.
- Education: Brown University
- Occupation: Hedge fund manager
- Known for: Co-founder and managing partner of Bracebridge Capital
- Spouse: Andrei Shleifer

Nancy Gail Zimmerman (born 2 July 1963) is an American hedge fund manager. She is the co-founder and managing partner of Bracebridge Capital, a Boston-based hedge fund with over $12 billion of assets under management as of 2026. The fund manages investments for foundations, pensions, high net worth individuals and endowments, including those of Yale University and Princeton University. She gained media attention in 1997 for her involvement in the Harvard Institute for International Development's Russian aid controversy and in the 2010s for her firm's role in Argentina's debt restructuring. As of 2019, she is the wealthiest female hedge fund founder in the U.S.

== Early life ==
Nancy Zimmerman was born and raised in Skokie, Illinois, the youngest of two girls. She graduated from Brown University in 1985.

== Career ==
While attending Brown University, Zimmerman spent her summers working for O’Connor & Associates at the Chicago Mercantile Exchange. After graduation she spent three years with the firm, trading currency options. She later managed the interest rate option group for Goldman Sachs. At Goldman, her boss was Jon Corzine, who later became the Governor of New Jersey.

=== Bracebridge Capital ===
Zimmerman co-founded Bracebridge Capital with Gabriel Sunshine in 1994 with $50 million in seed investment from Farallon Capital and Yale's investment office. The fund also manages investments for Princeton University. As of 2026, it had over $12 billion of assets under management.

In 2016, Bracebridge and a group of hedge funds successfully contested the debt obligations of Argentina in a New York court of law. Under the deal negotiated, the hedge funds received about 75% of their judgements with Bracebridge receiving 952% gains, or $1.1 billion on an investment of $120 million.

=== Russian investments and settlement ===
In 1997, USAID ended a $14 million grant to the Harvard Institute for International Development, headed by Zimmerman's husband Andrei Shleifer, which had been used to establish the Institute for Law-Based Economy in Russia. Shleifer was accused of using the institute to help Zimmerman with her investments in Russia, including bonds issued by the Russian government. As part of a settlement, Zimmerman's company, Farallon Fixed Income Associates, subsequently paid $1.5 million to the US government. Neither Zimmerman nor her husband admitted wrongdoing.

== Personal life ==
Zimmerman is married to Andrei Shleifer, a professor of economics at Harvard University. She is Jewish. As of June 2019, she was worth an estimated $740 million and ranked #32 on Forbes 2019 America's Self-Made Women List.

Zimmerman serves on the board of trustees of her alma mater, Brown University, a position she previously held from 2010 to 2016. She also serves as the Chair of the Carney Institute for Brain Science Advisory Council and is a member of the board of directors of Social Finance. Previously she served on the scholar selection committee of the Institute of International Education's Scholar Rescue Fund. In 2026, Zimmerman and her husband provided the funding to launch The Neuroscience Transformative Scholars program supporting early-career investigators at Massachusetts General Hospital.
