= LSV Asset Management =

Investment firm based in Chicago

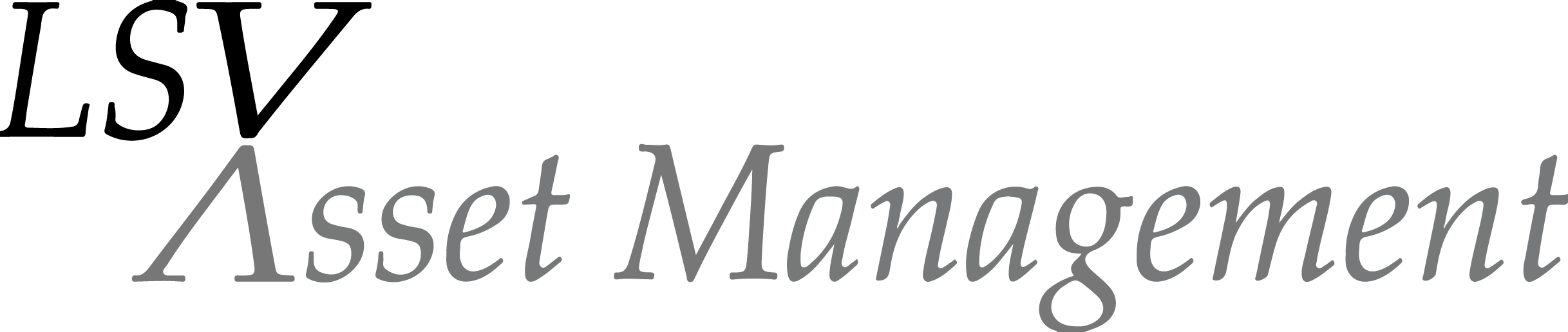
- Company type: Private
- Industry: Investment Management
- Founded: 1994; 32 years ago
- Founders: Josef Lakonishok; Andrei Shleifer; Robert W. Vishny
- Headquarters: 155 North Wacker, Chicago, Illinois, U.S.
- Key people: Josef Lakonishok (CEO)
- AUM: US$96 billion (June 2024)
- Owners: SEI Investments Company (39%); Josef Lakonishok (25%)
- Number of employees: 43 (2024)
- Website: www.lsvasset.com

LSV Asset Management (LSV) is an American quantitative investment management firm headquartered in Chicago. The firm provides equity management services for institutional investors.

== Background ==
LSV was founded in 1994 by Josef Lakonishok, Andrei Shleifer and Robert W. Vishny. The three of them were working in academia where they were Professors in the fields of Economics and Finance. Lakonishok is a professor (now retired) at University of Illinois at Urbana-Champaign while Shleifer and Vishny are professors at Harvard University and University of Chicago respectively. They focused on the field of Behavioral Finance. LSV is the first letter of each co-founders surname. SEI Investments Company backed the firm in exchange for a 51% stake.

In 2003, Shleifer sold his entire ownership of the firm and retired from firm to focus on his academic career. In 2006, Vishny reduced his ownership of the firm to 6% and retired from the firm at the end of 2007.

LSV is an active manager that uses a quantitative approach to value investing in the stock market.

In October 2024, four former executives sued LSV who claim they were deprived of more than $100 million in LSV equity when the firm forced them to sell their equity at a significantly reduced price.

The majority of the firm is owned by current and former employees while a minority stake is held by SEI Investments Company.
