= Rights upon future offers =

Clause used in legal contracts

A rights upon future offers (RUFO) clause is a clause used in certain contracts, in which a party who has agreed to contractual terms, gains certain rights if other parties in future obtain better or different terms. Such clauses may be used to induce a party to be more willing to accept contractual terms, in the knowledge that if better terms are offered to someone else in future, the same improved terms will also be applied retrospectively to all existing parties as well.

An example of the potential dangers of such clauses, if not considered carefully, arose during the Argentine debt restructuring of 2005–2014. In this case 93% of bondholders accepted a reduced settlement while 7% refused and went on to win a lawsuit entitling them to full settlement. Argentina declared itself unable to pay either, despite having the money to do so, since the settlement of a better offer with the small number of holdout creditors would, it feared, trigger a RUFO clause and cause the remaining 93% to be entitled to receive their payment in full as well, which the country could not afford.

== See also ==
- Pari passu
- Most favoured nation
