= Fondo Común =

Bank based in Caracas, Venezuela

Banco Fondo Común
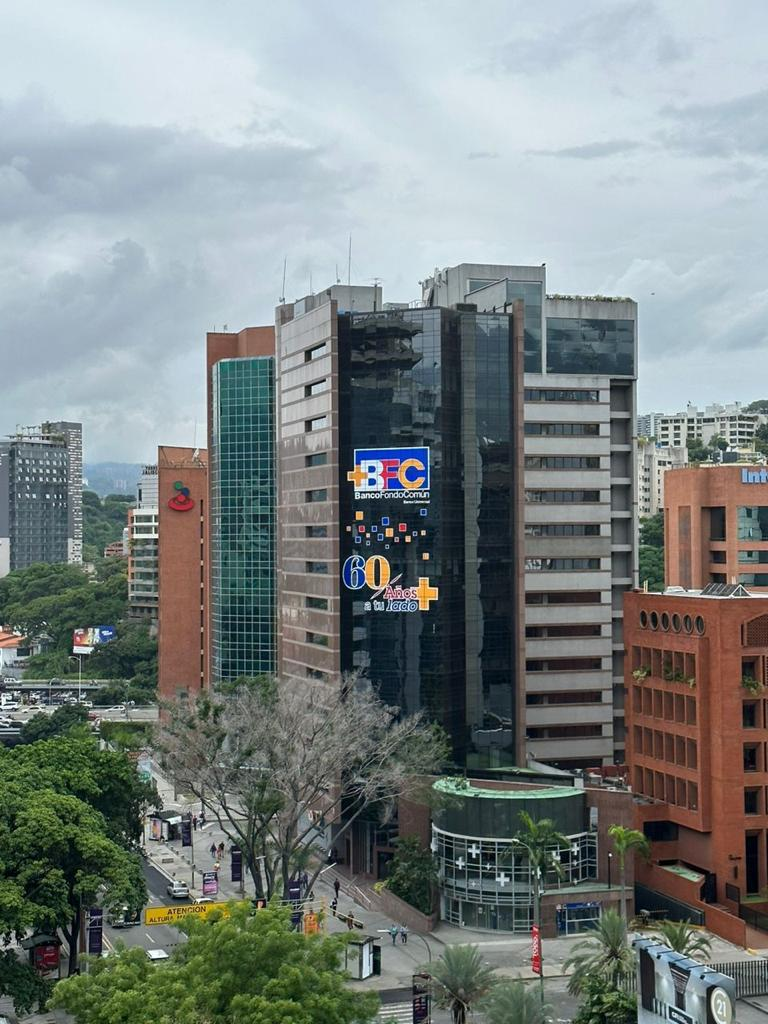
- Native name: Spanish
- Company type: Private
- Industry: Financial
- Founded: 1963
- Headquarters: Caracas, Estado Miranda, Venezuela

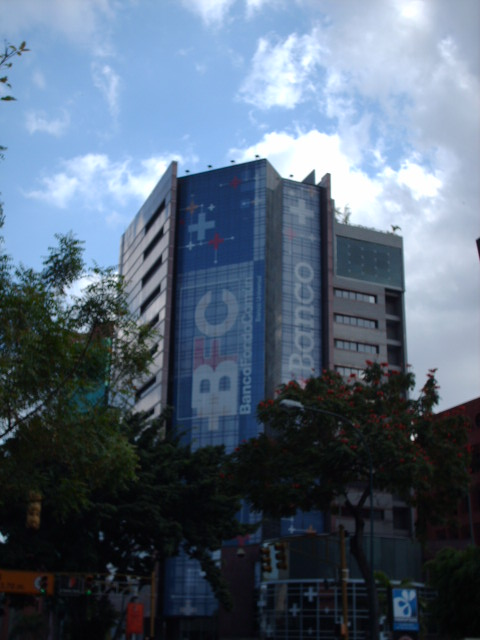
BFC headquarters in Caracas.

Banco Fondo Común (Banco Fondo Común CA, BFC) is a bank in Venezuela. It is based in the city of Caracas, and has 165 banking agencies across the country. Customers can use the BFC Mobile App to access their account information.
