= Debt restructuring =

Renegotiating a debt

Debt restructuring is a process that allows a private or public company or a sovereign entity facing cash flow problems and financial distress to reduce and renegotiate its delinquent debts to improve or restore liquidity so that it can continue its operations.

Replacement of old debt by new debt when not under financial distress is called "refinancing". Out-of-court restructurings, also known as workouts, are increasingly becoming a global reality.

== Motivation ==
Debt restructuring involves reduction of debt and an extension of payment terms and is usually less expensive than bankruptcy. The main costs associated with debt restructuring are the time and effort spent negotiating with bankers, creditors, vendors, and tax authorities.

In the United States, small business bankruptcy filings cost at least $50,000 in legal and court fees, and filing costs in excess of $100,000 are common. By some measures, only 20% of firms survive Chapter 11 bankruptcy filings.

Historically, debt restructuring has been the province of large corporations with financial wherewithal. In the Great Recession that began with the 2008 financial crisis, a component of debt restructuring called debt mediation emerged for small businesses (with revenues under $5 million). Like debt restructuring, debt mediation is a business-to-business activity and should not be considered the same as individual debt reduction involving credit cards, unpaid taxes, and defaulted mortgages.

In 2010 debt mediation has become a primary way for small businesses to refinance in light of reduced lines of credit and direct borrowing. Debt mediation can be cost-effective for small businesses, help end or avoid litigation, and is preferable to filing for bankruptcy. While there are numerous companies providing restructuring for large corporations, there are few legitimate firms working for small businesses. Legitimate debt restructuring firms only work for the debtor client (not as a debt collection agency) and should charge fees based on success.

Among the debt situations that can be worked out in business-to-business debt mediation are: lawsuits and judgments, delinquent property, machinery, equipment rentals/leases, business loans or mortgage on business property, capital payments due for improvements/construction, invoices and statements, disputed bills and problem debts.

== Methods ==
=== Debt-for-equity swap ===
In a debt-for-equity swap, a company's creditors generally agree to cancel some or all of the debt in exchange for equity in the company.

Debt for equity deals often occur when large companies run into serious financial trouble, and often result in these companies being taken over by their principal creditors. This is because both the debt and the remaining assets in these companies are so large that there is no advantage for the creditors to drive the company into bankruptcy. Instead the creditors prefer to take control of the business as a going concern. As a consequence, the original shareholders' stake in the company is generally significantly diluted in these deals and may be entirely eliminated, as is typical in a Chapter 11 bankruptcy.

Agreements to swap debt for equity also often occur because companies are obliged to comply, per the terms of a contract with certain lending institutions, with specified debt to equity ratios.

Debt-for-equity swaps are one way of dealing with sub-prime mortgages. A householder unable to service his debt on a $180,000 mortgage for example, may by agreement with his bank have the value of the mortgage reduced (say to $135,000 or 75% of the house's current value), in return for which the bank will receive 50% of the amount by which any resale value, when the house is resold, exceeds $135,000.

=== Bondholder haircuts ===
A debt-for-equity swap may also be called a "bondholder haircut". Bondholder haircuts at large banks were advocated as a potential solution for the subprime mortgage crisis by prominent economists:

Economist Joseph Stiglitz testified that bank bailouts "are really bailouts not of the enterprises but of the shareholders and especially bondholders. There is no reason that American taxpayers should be doing this". He wrote that reducing bank debt levels by converting debt into equity will increase confidence in the financial system. He believes that addressing bank solvency in this way would help address credit market liquidity issues.

Economist Jeffrey Sachs has also argued in favor of such haircuts: "The cheaper and more equitable way would be to make shareholders and bank bondholders take the hit rather than the taxpayer. The Fed and other bank regulators would insist that bad loans be written down on the books. Bondholders would take haircuts, but these losses are already priced into deeply discounted bond prices."

If the key issue is bank solvency, converting debt to equity via bondholder haircuts presents an elegant solution to the problem. Not only is debt reduced along with interest payments, but equity is simultaneously increased. Investors can then have more confidence that the bank (and financial system more broadly) is solvent, helping unfreeze credit markets. Taxpayers do not have to contribute dollars and the government may be able to just provide guarantees in the short term to buttress confidence in the recapitalized institution. For example, Wells Fargo owed its bondholders $267 billion, according to its 2008 annual report. A 20% haircut would reduce this debt by about $54 billion, creating an equal amount of equity in the process, thereby recapitalizing the bank significantly.

==== Exit consent ====
Exit consent is a formal agreement that allows a majority group of creditors holding sovereign bonds to change the non-financial terms of the bonds in a way that makes the bonds effectively worthless for the minority holdouts, motivating them to accept a restructuring offer. Thus creditors willing to restructure can outmaneuver holdouts by using the supermajority voting features of existing bonds to secure changes, which reduce their value as they are tendered in exchange for restructured debt. Government bond issued by sovereign nations are often perceived as safe investments. But over time, countries in difficult economic situations have needed to restructure their debt structure, or see their national economy collapse. During that process, the country must restructure the outstanding debt by offering its old bonds holders new instruments that reflect new financial terms. It is a process that sees the emergence of holdout creditors who refuse the proposed restructuring, posing a problem to the reorganization process the holdout problem. Therefore, the threat of an exit consent is used to encourage (or coerce) minority creditors to accept the exchange offer so they are not left with diminished bonds.

=== Other debt repayment agreements ===
Most defendants who cannot pay the enforcement officer in full at once enter into negotiations with the officer to pay by installments. This process is informal but cheaper and quicker than an application to the court.

Payment by this method relies on the cooperation of the creditor and the enforcement officer. It is therefore important not to offer more than you can afford or to fall behind with the payments you agree. If you do fall behind with the payments and the enforcement officer has seized goods, they may remove them to the sale room for auction.

Subchapter V in the US was created in 2019 by the Small Business Reorganization Act (SBRA). It offers accelerated deadlines and the speed with which the plan is confirmed reduces cost. Congress temporarily increased the ceiling of maximum funded debt eligibility to $7.5mm during COVID-19, and extended it in 2022.

== In various jurisdictions ==
=== Canada ===
Two common avenues for restructuring debt exist in Canada: a Division 1 Proposal and a CCAA filing. The former is available to both corporations and individuals who owe $250,000 or more to creditors. The latter is available only to larger companies owing more than $5 million to their creditors.

A Division 1 Proposal is a last resort. Created by the Bankruptcy and Insolvency Act of 1985, the option to file Division 1 is not an option to be taken lightly as, in the event that the stipulations within the proposal get voted down by creditors or not signed off by the court, one falls into bankruptcy. Division 1 proposals allow companies to be briefly relieved of lawsuits by creditors, as well as they allow companies to stop paying money to their unsecured creditors while the proposal is being reviewed. A Division 1 Proposal to restructure debts must secure 66% of the creditors' votes set in proportion to how much they are owed, and 50% plus one of all creditors votes in terms of number of creditors. On top of such democratic approval, the court itself has to approve how the debts get restructured. Withstanding all such approval, a business or individual can continue operating as normal; otherwise, a business or individual is obliged to proceed into bankruptcy filing.

CCAA filings were created by the Companies' Creditors Arrangement Act, a piece of legislation first put forward and passed in 1933 and updated later in 1985. A CCAA filing allows a Canadian company to have a window in time (typically between 30 and 90 days) in which they can renegotiate and reorganize their debt payment plans with creditors. During this brief period, creditors cannot seize any money that is owed to them. These windows of time may be renewed multiple times over. Once a CCAA application gets finally rejected, the company in question can be forced into receivership or bankruptcy. This could happen for a number of reasons, chief among them being a failure to come to an agreement with creditors as to how to restructure the debt.

=== Switzerland ===
Under Swiss law, debt restructuring may occur out of court, or through a court-mediated debt restructuring agreement that may provide for a partial waiver of debts, or for a liquidation of the debtor's assets by the creditors.

=== United Kingdom ===
The majority of debt restructuring within the United Kingdom is undertaken on a collaborative basis between the borrower and the creditors (a company voluntary arrangement or individual voluntary arrangement). Historically, such a contract was called a composition with creditors. Should this be unsatisfactory in the first instance, the court may be asked to mediate and appoint administrators.

=== United States ===
Among the most common forms of in-court debt restructuring for firms in the United States are Chapter 11 and Chapter 12 bankruptcy.

Under Chapter 11, firms form a plan to reorganize their credit obligations, such that they are able to continue operating while they are going through with their debt repayment plans and after they become solvent. Creditors are given promises to be paid back with firms' future earnings. The nature of these promises can be shaped in a number of ways. In situations where every single impaired creditor of a firm agrees to a settled schedule of repayment, the plan formed is known as a "consensual plan." When a certain class a firm owes does not accept a restructuring plan, said plan may still be approved pursuant to the United States Bankruptcy Code. Such plans are colloquially referred to as "cramdown plans." Chapter 11 is considered to be one of the most expensive and complicated forms of bankruptcy to file. The vast majority of Chapter 11 bankruptcy cases filed end up allowing company management to go forward running the business as usual; however, in certain exceptional cases (fraud, gross incompetence, etc.) the courts do not allow the business the privilege of simply maintaining a "debtor in possession" status. In said cases, a trustee is appointed by the court to run the business until all bankruptcy proceedings are completed.

Chapter 12 Bankruptcy is a form of debt restructuring in the United States available to farms and fisheries exclusively; said businesses could be family-owned or owned by corporations. The special debt restructuring rights accorded to farmers and fisheries consequent line 12 of the United States Bankruptcy Code were first granted by Congress in 1986 amid an agricultural debt crisis. Food commodity prices were caught in a downward spiral in the years leading up to 1986, pushing U.S. farmers' debts to levels above $200 billion. This 12th line of the U.S. Bankruptcy Code was initially added only as a temporary measure and remained as a temporary measure until 2005, when it became permanent. Chapter 12 was of great benefit to farmers, because Chapter 11 was often too expensive for family farms and generally only useful for sizeable corporations, while Chapter 13 was mainly of use to individuals attempting to restructure very small debts. Farms and fisheries, being midsize and seasonal in nature, were thus in need of a more flexible legal framework through which they could restructure their debts.

Firms in the United States are not limited to only using the legal system to manage debts they are incapable of repaying. Out-of-court restructuring, or workouts, constitute consensual agreements between firms and their creditors to adjust debt obligations, mainly for the purpose of evading the costly legal fees associated with Chapter 11. The decision as to whether to enter a workout or take the issue into court is, in large a part, a function of the creditors' and debtors' respective perceptions of how much can be gained or lost through a Chapter 11 proceeding. Creditors know that once Chapter 11 has commenced, a degree of negotiating leverage is lost, as judicial authorities may impose alterations of claims without regard to creditors' consent. On numerous occasions, merely throwing out the threat of filing bankruptcy has initiated the process of coming to a private agreement.

=== Italy ===
Debt restructuring within Italy may occur either out of court (ex article 167 of the Italian Bankruptcy Law) when a waiver or simple debt rescheduling is required, or through a court-mediated debt restructuring agreement (ex article 182/bis of the Italian Bankruptcy Law) and may provide for a partial waiver of debts, mandatory recapitalization of the debtor, or for a liquidation of certain debtor's assets to repay privileged creditors.

=== Germany ===
While being famous for its efficiency in other matter, this is not true for debt restructuring. Many German companies prefer to restructure their debts using the English scheme of arrangement proceedings because they believe that the German restructuring law is not very helpful. The main reason for this is that binding a dissenting minority is only possible under formal insolvency proceedings in Germany.

== Corporate restructuring ==
As the incidence of corporate failures has increased in part due to current economic climate, a more "standard" approach to restructuring has developed. Although every case has unique characteristics, the process of restructuring follows a number of important phases. Initially, declining financial performance will cause key financial covenants - for example, leverage ratios - along with the company's underlying cash position to become tight and the prospect of the company needing to restructure will become more obvious to creditors and the debtor alike. This triggers a gathering of creditors and other stakeholders, in anticipation of a breach of financial covenants, a crisis of liquidity, or impending debt instruments coming due that will not be able to be refinanced, all of which could be the impetus for a bankruptcy taking place if not rectified.

The lending group (typically comprising corporate finance divisions of banks) will normally commission a corporate advisory group to review the business and its financial position. This will form the basis of any restructuring of facilities. The lending group will typically appoint a Corporate Restructuring Officer (CRO) to assist management in the turnaround of the business, and embracing the recommendations presented by the banking group and the corporate advisory report.

== See also ==
- Debt relief
- Debt settlement
- Strategic default
- Troubled debt restructuring

== Sources ==
- Tutino, Marco; Ranciaro, Valerio (2020). Innovation in Financial Restructuring: Focus on Signals, Processes and Tools. Virtus Interpress.
