= Troubled debt restructuring =

A troubled debt restructuring (TDR) is defined as a debt restructuring in which a creditor, for economic or legal reasons related to a debtor's financial difficulties, grants a concession to the debtor that it would not otherwise consider. As such, in order for a debt restructuring to be a considered a TDR, two conditions must be present:

1. The debtor must be experiencing financial difficulties.
2. The creditor must grant a concession in consequence of the debtor's financial difficulties.

TDRs provide the borrower an alternative to declaring bankruptcy and the lender from taking total loss on the money owed via a private renegotiation. Studies have suggested that around half of TDRs are successful in providing long-run repayment stability and that firms with more intangible assets may have the most to gain via private renegotiation in lieu of bankruptcy proceedings and that in the future TDRs are likely to become more popular among managers of distressed companies.
