= Pari passu =

Latin phrase; "on equal footing"

Pari passu is a Latin phrase that literally means "with an equal step" or "on equal footing". It is sometimes translated as "ranking equally", "hand-in-hand", "with equal force", or "moving together", and by extension, "fairly", "without partiality".

== Etymology ==
- pari is the ablative singular masculine (since it must grammatically agree with passu) of the adjective par, "equal". If it were nominative, "an equal step", it would be par passus.
- passu is the ablative of the Latin noun passus, "step".

Black's Law Dictionary (8th ed., 2004) defines pari passu as "proportionally; at an equal pace; without preference". Common in bankruptcy and finance, it ensures proportional distribution of assets, rights, or obligations among parties. This term is commonly used in law. Black's Law Dictionary (8th ed., 2004) defines pari passu as "proportionally; at an equal pace; without preference".

== Usage ==
=== In inheritance ===
In inheritance, a pari passu (per capita) distribution can be distinguished from a per stirpes (by family branch) distribution.

For example, suppose a testator had two children, A and B. A has two children, and B has three.

- If the testator leaves their entire estate to their grandchildren in equal shares pari passu, each grandchild would inherit one-fifth of the estate.
- In contrast, if the estate were left to the grandchildren per stirpes (by family branch), the children of A would share one-half of the estate equally between the two of them, and the children of B would share one-half of the estate equally among the three of them.

=== In lending, bankruptcy and default ===
This term is also often used in the lending area and in bankruptcy proceedings, where creditors are said to be paid pari passu, or each creditor is paid pro rata in accordance with the amount of his claim. Here, its meaning is "equally and without preference". There have been cases where decisions were based on different interpretations of the term.

In the European Union, as the result of the Greek government-debt crisis, a retroactive collective action clause passed by the Greek government with the support of the ECB and IMF, enabled the debtor (who also controlled the courts) to impose a 70% loss on the creditors, more than 75% of whom had voted in favour of the cut. In this case, pari passu means that all private-sector investors are equally treated.

== See also ==
- Statute of Bankrupts Act 1542, introducing the pari passu principle for creditors of insolvent persons. Pari passu means treated at par with the previous issue.
- Seniority (finance)
- List of Latin phrases
- Collective action clause
- Rights upon future offers
