= GDP-linked bond =

Debt security linked to a country's Gross Domestic Product

In finance, a GDP-linked bond is a debt security or derivative security in which the authorized issuer (a country) promises to pay a return, in addition to amortization, that varies with the behavior of Gross Domestic Product (GDP). This type of security can be thought as a “stock on a country” in the sense that it has "equity-like" features. It pays more or less when the performance of the country is better or worse than expected. Nevertheless, it is substantially different from a stock because there are no ownership-rights over the country.

GDP-linked bonds are a form of floating-rate bond with a coupon that is associated with the growth rate of a country, just as other floating-rate bonds are linked to interest rates, such as LIBOR or federal funds rate, or inflation rates, which is the case of inflation-indexed bonds. These securities can be issued to reference real GDP, nominal GDP or aspects of both. In some cases, however, these securities may not have any principal claim and the notional is only used as a basis for calculating the investor's share of payments.

The term GDP-linked bond is often used interchangeably with the terms GDP-indexed bond, GDP-linked security, and GDP-indexed security in the literature. Sometimes the term warrant is used as well. This is likely because it is a relatively new asset class in which there are few real examples—the few of which were created from restructurings rather than primary issuance. There is also a variety of different ways that these instruments can be structured. For example, they can take the form of equity-like securities where payments are solely contingent on GDP growth or another extreme where they can resemble vanilla bonds with adjustments based upon GDP performance. The country will designate the classification in the instrument's indenture or prospectus.

== Advantages for the issuer ==
Advantages for the issuer were reported as follows:

Debt service varies with ability to pay. Therefore, if a country has poor economic performance, it needs to pay less on its obligations to the investors. This means that this type of security has countercyclical features. The existence of this type of debt can reduce the probability of default because they tend to keep the debt/GDP ratios within a narrower range than fixed income bonds.

GDP-linked bonds also act as automatic stabilizers and reduce the temptation for policymakers to spend too much in periods of high growth. In this sense this type of bond may be especially useful for developing countries where the presence of weaker institutions makes it easier for governments to implement more volatile policies. Moreover, this type of bond allows governments to implement less volatile tax policies, since there is less need to increase taxes during times of poor economic performance because it is precisely during these times when debt repayments are lower. If we believe that agents prefer to smooth consumption across time and across states of nature then it is worth it to do so. Hence using GDP-linked bonds may be welfare improving.

Furthermore, emerging markets are usually forced to actually undertake more austere measures in times of crises than their developed counterparts, and it is common to see that emerging markets reduce public expenditures in times of crises with the purpose of reassuring international investors. This means that countries cut their expenditures when they need it the most.

In terms of social policy it has been mentioned that GDP-linked bonds disproportionately benefit the poor because using them reduces the need to cut social benefits when economic performance is low, given that the debt repayments are lower.

For a corporate issuer or project finance issuer whose revenues will be driven by (amongst other things) GDP, to issue GDP-linked debt would leave the overall capital structure less risky.

Finally, even if this type of bond were initially thought in the context of emerging markets, they also constitute an interesting idea for developed countries.

== Advantages for the investor ==
For an investor who wants to purchase an income stream that rises with average incomes, but does not want the volatility of the stock market, they could be attractive. A committee in the UK which looked at where people would ideally save, concluded that ideal pensions would be linked to average incomes prior to retirement and to inflation after retirement.

These instruments also provide an investor with the opportunity to speculate on a country's increase in GDP if they have a more favorable view of the country's prospects relative to other market participants.

== Disadvantages for the issuer ==
GDP-linked bonds may cause political economy problems, in good times countries have to pay more to their debt holders, so citizens can potentially complain arguing that the governors contracted debt to favor the lenders. Another reason to worry about the characteristics of these bonds is that they may create perverse incentives (moral hazard) to misreport growth, not revise GDP figures or even worse to repress growth.

An additional critique that has been exposed is that there are other debt instruments that could be superior in the task of insuring risk for consumers. That is, for example, the case of CPI-indexed local currency bonds. Crises are generally accompanied by large exchange rate depreciations that are driven by the fall in domestic consumption. This fall in consumption decelerates the CPI growth and in turn bonds linked to it pay less during crisis. Given that economic agents are more interested in consumption smoothing than in the stabilization of output, CPI-indexed local currency bonds may provide a better insurance against shocks than GDP-linked bonds. However, these types of bonds do not allow direct exposure to real GDP growth and only permit investors to smooth out consumption if they have a natural exposure to the CPI of the nation—such as citizens of the nation.

== Disadvantages for the investor ==
There may not be a sufficient number of participants to issue and invest in this type of security. The market has not developed in part because there are few incentives to be the first to move. Being one of the initiators in this type of market implies taking risks and undergoing a learning process that many agents are not incentivized to do. Also, more countries need to issue these types of securities so that investors are able to diversify. Given these facts, there is scope for public intervention. For example, an initiative from multilateral institutions could play the role of first mover and coordinate issuances of GDP-linked bonds from different countries. There may, thus, be a discount reflecting illiquidity.

These securities introduce investors to new forms of risks different from other sovereign instruments. Investors are exposed to the country's GDP level and growth path which may or may not be favorable. Moreover, investors may be at the mercy of the issuing country honesty with respect to economic data. The methodology for valuing these securities is also somewhat complex as these are akin to financial derivatives. Lastly, the ranking of these instruments in the case of a debt default may not be favorable as these are equity-like instruments which, as in the recent Greece and Argentina GDP linked securities, have no legal principal claim.

== Historical background ==
Previous to the actual issuance of GDP-linked bonds, there were some financial innovations that lead to the appearance of bonds that had features related to the economic performance of the issuing country. Mexico issued several bonds indexed to oil prices during the 1970s and later on, in the early 1990s, Mexico, Nigeria, Uruguay and Venezuela issued some Brady bonds with Value Recovery Rights (VRR), that were structured to pay higher returns when the price of certain commodities was sufficiently high.

The first pure GDP-linked bonds were issued by Costa Rica, Bulgaria and Bosnia Herzegovina, also in the context of the Brady restructuring agreements, in the 1990s.

Greece and Argentina issued warrant-like instruments with some similarities to GDP-linked bonds as part of their recent restructurings in 2012 and 2005 respectively.

Argentina issued a GDP-linked instrument in 2002, as part of a debt-restructuring of its 2001 default. Argentina's GDP-linked instrument was issued in exchange for debt that the investors forgave in the debt default. It did not take the form of a bond, however, as it did not have any principal due associated with it. The annual dividends of the instrument can allow the investor to recoup up to 48% of the notional of the instrument provided that Argentina's GDP growth exceeded certain benchmarks over 30 years.

Greece issued a GDP-linked instrument as part of its debt default in 2012 somewhat similar to a GDP-linked bond. Under the terms of the Greek security, investors can receive only up to 1% of their notional in a given year provided that a number of conditions are met. Payments on Greece warrants, moreover, are based on a formula that only considers Greece's growth rather than the level of Greece's GDP. Finally, the payment obligations on the GDP-linked securities require Greece's GDP to attain certain levels and GDP forecasts have been falling for Greece. The Greece GDP warrants are not technically bonds as investors do not have any principal claim against the government of Greece in the event of a default.

== A simple example ==
Suppose a country has been growing in the last few years at an average rate of 3% and is expected to do so in the coming years. Suppose also that this country can issue debt using a fixed-income bond with a coupon of 7%. This country can issue a GDP-linked bond that pays 7% when output growth at the end of the year is exactly 3% and will pay more or less accordingly to its economic performance. That is, for example, if the country grows 1% instead of 3%, then the GDP-linked bond will pay a coupon of 5% instead of 7%. Conversely, if there is an unusually better economic performance and the country grows 5% instead of 3%, then the GDP-linked bond will pay a coupon of 9%.

== Categories ==
Shiller method: The value of the instrument depends on the value of GDP

Borensztein and Mauro: The return varies with the growth rate of real GDP

== See also ==
- Bond (finance)
- Common stock
- Derivative (finance)
- Equity
- Inflation-indexed bonds
- Floating-rate bond
- Warrant (finance)
