= Robert W. Vishny =

American economist

Academic background
- Education: University of Michigan (BA); Massachusetts Institute of Technology (Ph.D.)
- Doctoral advisor: Franklin M. Fisher; Eric Maskin

Academic work
- Discipline: Behavioral finance
- Institutions: University of Chicago

Robert Ward Vishny (born c. 1959) is an American economist and is the Myron S. Scholes Distinguished Service Professor of Finance at the University of Chicago Booth School of Business. He was the Eric J. Gleacher Distinguished Service Professor of Finance at the University of Chicago Booth School of Business.

== Education ==
He received his A.B. with highest distinction (economics, mathematics, and philosophy) from the University of Michigan in 1981 and Ph.D. (Economics) from Massachusetts Institute of Technology in 1985.

== Academic career ==
Robert Vishny is one of the prominent representatives of the school of behavioral finance. His research activities include: market for corporate control; corporate governance around the world; privatization and the role of government in the economy; behavior of institutional investors; behavior of stock prices; the economics of corruption and rent-seeking behavior. His research papers (all of them written jointly with Andrei Shleifer, and many also with Rafael La Porta, Florencio Lopez-de-Silanes, and Shleifer, known as LLSV) have been extremely influential, especially on the topic of law and finance. He has also published multiple papers with Josef Lakonishok.

From 1991 to 1998, Vishny headed the NBER Program in Corporate Finance. In 1994, he founded (along with Josef Lakonishok and Andrei Shleifer) LSV Asset Management (LSV), a quantitative value equity manager providing active management for institutional investors through the application of proprietary investment models based on the principles of behavioural finance.

In 2018, Vishny was named as a Fellow of the American Finance Association.

== Selected publications ==
=== Journal articles ===
- Vishny, Robert W, & LaPorta, R. & Lopez-de-Silanes, F. & Shleifer, A. Law and Finance, Journal of Political Economy, 1998, 106(6), pp. 1113.
- Vishny, Robert W. & Shleifer, A. A Survey of Corporate Governance, Journal of Finance, 1997, 52(2), pp. 737–83.
- Vishny, Robert W. & Shleifer, A. The Limits of Arbitrage, Journal of Finance, 1997, 52(1), pp. 35–55.
- Vishny, Robert W. & Lakonishok, J. & Shleifer, A. Contrarian Investment, Extrapolation and Risk, Journal of Finance 1994, 49(5), pp. 1541–78.
- Vishny, Robert W. & Shleifer, A. Large Shareholders and Corporate Control, Journal of Political Economy, 1986, 94(3, Part 1), pp. 461–88.

The 1997 A Survey of Corporate Governance article broke free from the existing academic literature, which had mainly although not exclusively focused on corporate governance in the U.S., specifically the takeover market. Instead, this article by Shleifer and Vishny addressed the bigger question of why so many countries around the world had almost non-existent public equity (stock) markets, in comparison to the U.S., U.K., Japan, and a relatively small number of other countries in which selling stock to the general public was comparatively widespread. They noted that in many countries without active public capital markets, family firms are more important, and bank loans are a major source of external financing.

The framework that they used in their A Survey of Corporate Governance article led Shleifer and Vishny, along with two of Shleifer's doctoral students, LaPorta and Lopez-de-Silanes (LLSV), to publish their 1998 Law and Finance article. In this article, LLSV hypothesized that countries with a legal system based on British common law had legal systems that were more supportive of a governance structure that gave minority shareholders (that is, shareholders that each own only a small percentage of the shares) adequate protection to prevent a chief executive officer (CEO) and/or majority shareholder from expropriating them. They hypothesized that countries with a legal system based on the French civil law system did not provide as much protection, and thus outside shareholders would be less willing to buy stock in a company. Not all countries neatly fit into one of these two categories, but in a long series of highly cited papers, LLSV have provided empirical evidence that common law countries such as the U.S. have much more successful stock markets. In recent years, U.S. publicly trade corporations have distributed approximately $1 trillion per year in cash to their shareholders.
