= Collective action clause =

A collective action clause (CAC) allows a supermajority of bondholders to agree to a debt restructuring that is legally binding on all holders of the bond, including those who vote against the restructuring. Bondholders generally opposed such clauses in the 1980s and 1990s, fearing that it gave debtors too much power. However, following Argentina's December 2001 default on its debts in which its bonds lost 70% of their value, CACs have become much more common, as they are now seen as potentially warding off more drastic action, but enabling easier coordination of bondholders.

== Development and adoption in sovereign debt markets ==
Although majority-action provisions had long appeared in bonds governed by English law, sovereign bonds issued under New York law generally continued to require unanimous consent for changes to principal and interest terms through the 1990s. Lee C. Buchheit, a lawyer at Cleary Gottlieb Steen & Hamilton, was among the early market practitioners advocating contractual mechanisms to address creditor-coordination and holdout problems. In a series of articles published in 1998, he examined the use of majority-action clauses and proposed a "collective representation clause" that would authorize a trustee or fiscal agent to participate in restructuring discussions on behalf of bondholders.

In 2002, Buchheit and legal scholar Mitu Gulati argued in Sovereign Bonds and the Collective Will that existing contractual provisions and United States legal procedures could be used more effectively to facilitate orderly sovereign-debt restructurings. In March 2003, Mexico issued a US$1 billion New York-law sovereign bond containing CACs; the success of the offering influenced the International Monetary Fund and World Bank to support the contractual approach to sovereign-debt restructuring. Cleary Gottlieb subsequently used CAC provisions in Mexican and Uruguayan sovereign bonds, and similar provisions spread rapidly through the New York-law sovereign-bond market.

=== Greek debt restructuring ===
Before the Greek debt restructuring, Buchheit and Gulati published How to Restructure Greek Debt in 2010 and Greek Debt: The Endgame Scenarios in 2011, drawing attention to the fact that most Greek sovereign bonds were governed by domestic law and could therefore be affected by legislation enacted by the Greek parliament. They also proposed model language for standardized euro-area CACs in 2011.

Buchheit led the legal team advising Greece in its 2012 restructuring of approximately €206 billion of government bonds. The Greek Bondholder Act of 23 February 2012 retroactively introduced an aggregated voting mechanism into Greek-law sovereign bonds that had not originally contained CACs. The mechanism required participation representing at least 50 percent of the eligible face value and approval by holders of two-thirds of the face value participating in the vote; once those conditions were met, the amendment bound all holders of the covered Greek-law bonds. Reuters described Buchheit as having crafted the restructuring and identified the domestic-law route that permitted Greece to retrofit the voting mechanism.

In accordance with the treaty establishing the European Stability Mechanism, all bonds issued by Eurozone member states with maturities exceeding one year, issued after January 1, 2013, have a mandatory collective action clause.
