= Rafael La Porta =

American economist

Rafael La Porta (born c. 1962) is the Robert J. and Nancy D. Carney University Professor of Economics at Brown University. La Porta received his A.B. in economics at Pontifical Catholic University of Argentina in Argentina and his A.M. and Ph.D. in economics at Harvard University in Cambridge, MA. La Porta served as a professor of economics at Harvard and the Tuck School of Business at Dartmouth College before accepting a position at Brown. His research is primarily in corporate governance and investor protections across the world. He is the coauthor of the influential article "Law and Finance," which appeared in the Journal of Political Economy in December 1998.

== Bibliography ==
- Rafael La Porta; Florencio López-de-Silanes; National Bureau of Economic Research (1997). The benefits of privatization: evidence from Mexico. National Bureau of Economic Research.
- Rafael La Porta; Florencio Lopez-de-Silanes; Andrei Shleifer (2007). The Economic Consequences of Legal Origins. National Bureau of Economic Research.
