= Andrei Shleifer =

American economist

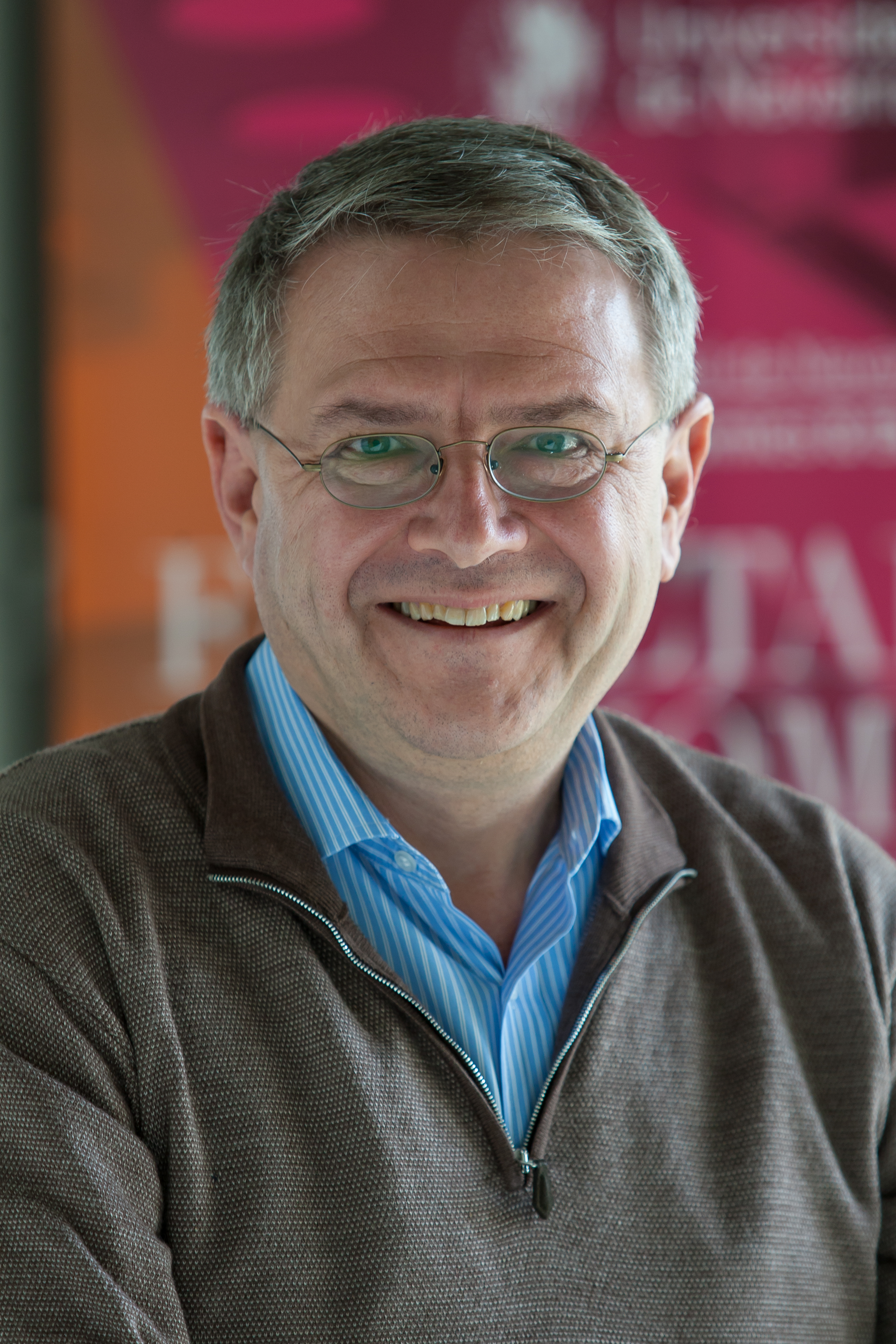
- Shleifer in 2018
- Born: February 20, 1961 (age 65); Moscow, Russian SFSR, Soviet Union

Academic background
- Education: Harvard University (BA); Massachusetts Institute of Technology (PhD)
- Doctoral advisor: Peter A. Diamond; Franklin M. Fisher
- Influences: Lawrence Summers; Milton Friedman

Academic work
- Discipline: Behavioral finance Law and economics Development economics
- Institutions: Harvard University; University of Chicago
- Doctoral students: See list: Matthew Gentzkow; Jesse Shapiro; Emily Oster; Ulrike Malmendier; John Friedman
- Notable ideas: Legal origins theory Big push model
- Awards: John Bates Clark Medal (1999)
- Website: Information at IDEAS / RePEc

Andrei Shleifer (/ˈʃlaɪfər/ SHLY-fər; born February 20, 1961) is a Russian-American economist and Professor of Economics at Harvard University, where he has taught since 1991. Shleifer was awarded the biennial John Bates Clark Medal in 1999 for his works in three fields: corporate finance (corporate governance, law and finance), the economics of financial markets (deviations from efficient markets), and the economics of transition.

IDEAS/RePEc ranked him as the second top economist in the world in 2011, and the top economist in 2024. He is also listed as #1 on the list of "Most-Cited Scientists in Economics & Business". On Google Scholar, as of 2024 he had over 400,000 citations.

== Life ==
He was born to a Jewish family in the Soviet Union and emigrated to Rochester, New York, as a teenager in 1976, where he attended an inner-city school and learned English from episodes of Charlie's Angels. He then studied mathematics, obtaining his BA from Harvard University in 1982. Following this, he went to graduate school in economics, acquiring his PhD from MIT in 1986 at the age of 25. As a freshman at Harvard, Shleifer took Math 55 with Brad DeLong; he has said that the course made him realize he was not destined to be a mathematician, but the experience gave him a future co-author. Shleifer also met his mentor and professor, Lawrence Summers, during his undergraduate education at Harvard. The two went on to be co-authors, joint grant recipients, and faculty colleagues.

He has held a tenured position in the Department of Economics at Harvard University since 1991 and was, from 2001 through 2006, the Whipple V. N. Jones Professor of Economics. Previously, he taught at the Graduate School of Business at the University of Chicago and briefly at Princeton University.

== Work ==
Shleifer's earliest work was in financial economics, where he has contributed to the field of behavioral finance. In 1994 Shleifer, along with Josef Lakonishok and Robert Vishny, published an article "Contrarian Investment, Extrapolation, and Risk" in which they addressed why value stocks had historically outperformed growth stocks. The article documented that, using a variety of measures of risk, a portfolio of growth stocks was riskier, on average, than a portfolio of value stocks.

In 1997, he and Robert Vishny published "The Limits to Arbitrage" that addressed efficient markets. The article notes that investors who bet against a major overvaluation or undervaluation are exposing themselves to substantial risks if there is uncertainty about how long it will take for the misvaluation to be corrected. This is especially true for a hedge fund for which its investors might withdraw their money if the hedge fund temporarily has disappointing returns, forcing the fund to buy an overvalued asset that it has shorted, or to sell an undervalued asset that it has bought. In Roger Lowenstein's 2000 book, When Genius Failed: The Rise and Fall of Long-Term Capital Management, the author credits Shleifer and Vishny with describing the problem that led to LTCM's 1998 collapse.

With coauthors Robert W. Vishny, Rafael La Porta, Simeon Djankov and Florencio Lopez de Silanes, Shleifer has also made significant contributions to the study of corporate governance. In particular, Shleifer and Vishny's 1997 article A Survey of Corporate Governance focused on the big differences across countries in the use of bank debt versus equity financing.

Starting in 1997, his research focused on the legal origins theory (also sometimes known as law and finance theory), which claims that the legal tradition a country adheres to (such as common law or various types of civil law) is an important determining factor for a country's development, most of all financial development. The 1998 "Law and Finance" article by Rafael La Porta, Florencio Lopez-de-Silanes, Andrei Shleifer, and Robert Vishny (known as LLSV) documented that countries with stronger legal protections of investors are less likely to have a few shareholders that control the firm, which they interpreted as showing that small equity investors are willing to provide capital without control when they have stronger legal protection against managers stealing or wasting the money that these investors provide. LLSV then extended their analysis with related papers published in 1997 examining "Legal Determinants of External Finance," in 2000 examining "Investor Protection and Corporate Governance" and "Agency Problems Dividend Problems Around the World," and in 2002 in "Investor Protection and Corporate Valuation." The dividends paper documented that countries with stronger shareholder protection tend to have more dividends paid to shareholders. An alternative explanation that they examined is that companies pay dividends in order to develop a reputation for returning cash to shareholders, so that they can issue more equity in the future. The evidence generally supports the investor protection explanation.

Shleifer has also written influential papers on political economy, the economics of transition, and economic development, collaborating with his former colleagues in Chicago, Kevin M. Murphy and Robert W. Vishny. Their 1989 paper "Industrialization and the Big Push" was credited by Paul Krugman as a major breakthrough which ended a "long slump in development theory". Shleifer's political economy work includes his 1993 article "Corruption" and his 1994 article "Politicians and Firms", both coauthored with Robert Vishny.

The Clark medal citation described him as a "superb economist, working in the old Chicago tradition of building simple models, emphasizing basic economic mechanisms, and carefully looking at the evidence.... A recurring theme of his research is the respective role of markets, institutions, and governments."

== Asset management ==
In 1994 Shleifer co-founded LSV Asset Management with Josef Lakonishok and Robert Vishny, with Lakonishok becoming the CEO and running the day-to-day operations of the firm. As of February 2006, it managed about $50 billion. Shleifer sold his ownership stake in 2003.

== Russian Project ==
During the early 1990s, Andrei Shleifer, a native Russian speaker, headed a Harvard project under the auspices of the Harvard Institute for International Development's Russian aid project from its inauguration in 1992 until 1997. Some people associated with the project made Russian investments, and he settled a lawsuit from the U.S. government for such a violation of HIID's contract. Shleifer was also a direct advisor to Anatoly Chubais, then vice-premier of Russia, who managed the Rosimushchestvo (Russian: росимущество, lit. 'Russian assets' or Committee for the Management of State Property) portfolio and was a primary engineer of Russian privatization. Shleifer was also tasked with establishing a stock market for Russia that would be a world-class capital market. In 1996 complaints about the Harvard project led Congress to launch a General Accounting Office investigation, which stated that the Harvard Institute for International Development (HIID) was given "substantial control of the U.S. assistance program.”

In 1997, the U.S. Agency for International Development (USAID) canceled most of its funding for the Harvard project after investigations showed that top HIID officials Andrei Shleifer and Jonathan Hay had used their positions and insider information to profit from investments in the Russian securities markets. Among other things, the Institute for a Law Based Economy (ILBE) was allegedly used to assist Shleifer's wife, Nancy Zimmerman, who operated a hedge fund that speculated in Russian bonds.

In 2004 Shleifer was found liable by a federal court for conspiracy to defraud the US government. In August 2005, Harvard University, Shleifer and the Department of Justice reached an agreement under which the university paid $26.5 million to settle the five-year-old lawsuit. Shleifer paid $2 million.

== Books ==
- Boycko, Maxim; ——; Vishny, Robert (1995). Privatizing Russia. Cambridge, MA: MIT Press. ISBN 978-0-262-02389-4.
- —— (2000). Inefficient Markets: An Introduction to Behavioral Finance. Oxford, UK: Oxford University Press. ISBN 978-0-19-829227-2.
