= Haircut (finance) =

Financial terminology

In finance, a haircut is the difference between the current market value of an asset and the value ascribed to that asset for purposes of calculating regulatory capital or loan collateral. The amount of the haircut reflects the perceived risk of the asset falling in value in an immediate cash sale or liquidation. The larger the risk or volatility of the asset price, the larger the haircut.

For example, United States Treasury bills, which are relatively safe and highly liquid assets, have little or no haircut, whereas more volatile or less marketable assets might have haircuts as high as 50%.

Lower haircuts allow for more leverage. Haircut plays an important role in many kinds of trades, such as repurchase agreements (referred to in debt-instrument finance as "repo" but not to be confused with the concept of repossession denoted by that term in consumer finance) and reverse repurchase agreements ("reverse repo" in debt-instrument finance).

In mass media, as well as in economics texts, especially after the 2008 financial crisis, the term "haircut" has been used mostly to denote a reduction of the amount that will be repaid to creditors, or, in other words, a reduction in the face value of a troubled borrower's debts, (Note: Not just state- but also corporate-debt.) as in "to take a haircut": to accept or receive less than is owed. In 2012, world media was reporting on the "biggest debt-restructuring deal in history", which included the "very large haircut" of some "70 percent of par value" of Greek state bonds, in NPV terms.

== SEC net capital rule ==
The financial term "haircut" began, and continues to be used, as a reference to valuation discounts applied under the U.S. Securities and Exchange Commission's net capital rule. The net capital rule was adopted to provide safeguards for public investors by setting standards of financial responsibility to be met by broker-dealers and requires a broker-dealer to have at all times sufficient liquid assets to cover its current indebtedness. The SEC explained the role of haircuts in calculating net capital in 1967:

In computing "net capital," the rule requires deductions from "net worth" of certain specified percentages of the market values of marketable securities and future commodity contracts, long and short, in the capital and proprietary accounts of the broker or dealer, and in the "accounts of partners." (These deductions are generally referred to in the industry as "haircuts.") . . . The purpose of these deductions from "net worth," is to provide a margin of safety against losses incurred by a broker or dealer as a result of market fluctuations in the prices of such securities or future commodity contracts.

"Haircut" since has been extended to a number of other financial contexts, whenever it is desirable to show that some securities (typically debt securities) are being valued for some purpose at a discount.

== ECB use of haircuts ==
The European Central Bank applies a haircut to all securities offered as collateral. The size of the haircut depends on the riskiness and liquidity of the security offered as collateral.

== LTCM and haircut fees ==
The hedge fund Long Term Capital Management (LTCM) saw spectacular losses that led to its dissolution in 1998. It had previously been able to trade with little collateral on positions that were considered safe by its lenders.

== As used for exchange-traded products ==
When used in the context of exchange traded products such as stocks, options, or futures, haircut is used interchangeably with the term margin. It is the amount of capital required by a broker to maintain the positions currently in a trading account. If haircut exceeds the account's capital, the broker can either require additional capital (e.g., margin call), or liquidate positions until the haircut no longer exceeds available capital.

== In sovereign debt write-downs ==
During the Eurozone crisis, and particularly in the context of the Greek government-debt crisis, the term "haircut" acquired more specifically the meaning of state-debt holders receiving less than par. It's "the market's euphemism for wiping out a large portion of the debt owed to the creditors".

The haircut agreed to by Greek-state debt holders was deemed "voluntary" by the banks' chief negotiator Charles Dallara, although, in order to convince domestic bond holders, the Greek government "made it clear that holdouts would not receive a sweeter deal", while it also declared that if the haircut was not completed, the Greek state would not be able to "further service its debt".
