= Committee of European Securities Regulators =

European financial regulatory body

The Committee of European Securities Regulators (CESR) was an independent committee of European Securities regulators, in place from 2001 to 2010. On 1 January 2011, it was replaced by the European Securities and Markets Authority (ESMA).

== Background ==
=== Chairs' Informal Group ===
While Europe's banking supervisors came together in a regular format as early as 1972 with the creation of the Groupe de Contact, the process of international coordination came more slowly to the securities space, if only because many European countries lacked an independent securities commission. Eventually, in 1989, the leaders of the Belgian Banking Commission (est. 1935, with its mandate expanded to securities in the 1960s), French Commission des Opérations de Bourse (COB, est. 1967), Italian Commissione Nazionale per le Società e la Borsa (CONSOB, est. 1974), UK Securities and Investments Board (SIB, est. 1985), Spanish Comisión Nacional del Mercado de Valores (CNMV, est. 1988), and Dutch Stichting Toezicht Effectenverkeer (STE, est. 1989) decided to gather regularly in an informal group which also included the German Federal Ministry of Finance (as Germany had not yet established a federal securities authority). The group had its first meeting at the newly created Dutch authority in Amsterdam in November 1989, and the next ones in London (March 1990), Paris (June 1990), Rome (October 1990), and Brussels (January 1991). The founding members were soon joined by the chairs of the Luxembourg Commissariat aux Bourses (est. 1990) and Portuguese Securities Market Commission (CMVM, est. 1991).

=== Forum of European Securities Commissions ===
In 1997, the securities commissions replaced their informal group with a more formalized organization, the Forum of European Securities Commissions (known as FESCO). The chairs of FESCO's member authorities usually met four times a year, and the organization also supported several expert groups on thematic regulatory issues, with a small permanent secretariat based in Paris. By 2000, FESCO's membership had grown to 17 authorities (those of the EU's then 15 member states, plus Iceland and Norway in the European Economic Area in place since 1994): in addition to the Dutch STE, French COB, Italian CONSOB, Portuguese CMVM, and Spanish CNMV, these were the Central Bank of Ireland, Greece's Capital Market Commission (est. 1969), Norway's Kredittilsynet (est. 1986), Denmark's Finanstilsynet (est. 1988), Belgium's Commission Bancaire et Financière (CBF, the new name of the Banking Commission since 1990), Sweden's Finansinspektionen (est. 1991), Finland's Rahoitustarkastus (est. 1993), Germany's Bundesaufsichtsamt für den Wertpapierhandel (BAWe, est. 1995), Austria's Bundes-Wertpapieraufsicht (BWA, est. 1997), Luxembourg's Commission de Surveillance du Secteur Financier (CSSF, which replaced the Commissariat aux Bourses in 1998), UK Financial Services Authority (FSA, which replaced the SIB in 1998), and Iceland's Financial Supervisory Authority (FME, est. 1999). The European Commission participated in FESCO meetings as an observer. FESCO was in turn replaced by CESR in 2001.

== Creation of CESR and subsequent development ==
CESR was created by decision of the European Commission on 6 June 2001, following a resolution of the European Council ("Stockholm Resolution") of 23 March 2001, and a subsequent resolution of the European Parliament. The role of the committee was to:

- Improve the coordination among securities regulators
- Act as an advisory group to assist European Commission
- Work on implementation of community legislation in EU member states

Two other Level-3 committees in the Lamfalussy process were created in 2004, the Committee of European Banking Supervisors (CEBS) and the Committee of European Insurance and Occupational Pensions Supervisors (CEIOPS).

On 1 January 2011, CESR was in turn replaced by the European Securities and Markets Authority (ESMA), which is part of the European System of Financial Supervision.

== Membership ==
The Committee's member organizations were:

- Austria: BWA (2001), then Financial Market Authority (FMA) from 1 January 2002
- Belgium: Commission bancaire et financière / Commissie voor het Bank- en Financiewezen (CBF)
- Bulgaria: Financial Supervision Commission, from accession on 1 January 2007
- Cyprus: Cyprus Securities and Exchange Commission, from accession on 1 May 2004
- Czech Republic: Czech Securities Commission from accession on 1 May 2004, then Czech National Bank from 1 April 2006
- Denmark: Finanstilsynet
- Estonia: Estonian Financial Supervisory Authority (Finantsinspektsioon), from accession on 1 May 2004
- Finland: Rahoitustarkastus (2001-2008), then the Finnish Financial Supervisory Authority (FIN-FSA) from 1 January 2009
- France: COB (2001-2003), then Autorité des Marchés Financiers (AMF) from 1 August 2003
- Germany: BAWe (2001-2002), then Bundesanstalt für Finanzdienstleistungsaufsicht (BaFin) from 1 May 2002
- Greece: Capital Market Commission (CMC)
- Hungary: Hungarian Financial Supervisory Authority (PSZÁF), from accession on 1 May 2004
- Iceland: Financial Supervisory Authority (FME)
- Ireland: Central Bank of Ireland (CBI), then Irish Financial Services Regulatory Authority from 1 May 2003 to 1 October 2010, then again the CBI
- Italy: Commissione Nazionale per le Società e la Borsa (CONSOB)
- Latvia: Financial and Capital Market Commission (FKTK), from accession on 1 May 2004
- Lithuania: Lithuanian Securities Commission, from accession on 1 May 2004
- Luxembourg: Commission de Surveillance du Secteur Financier (CSSF)
- Malta: Malta Financial Services Authority (MSFA), from accession on 1 May 2004
- Netherlands: STE (2001-2002), then Autoriteit Financiële Markten (AFM) from 1 March 2002
- Norway: Kredittilsynet, renamed Finanstilsynet in December 2009
- Poland: Securities and Exchange Commission (KPWiG) from accession on 1 May 2004, then Financial Supervision Authority (KNF) from 19 December 2006
- Portugal: Comissão do Mercado de Valores Mobiliários (CMVM)
- Romania: National Securities Commission (CNVM), from accession on 1 January 2007
- Slovenia: Securities Market Agency (ATVP), from accession on 1 May 2004
- Slovakia: Úrad pre Finančný Trh / Financial Market Authority (ÚFT) from accession on 1 May 2004, then National Bank of Slovakia from 1 January 2006
- Spain: Comisión Nacional del Mercado de Valores (CNMV)
- Sweden: Finansinspektionen
- United Kingdom: Financial Services Authority (FSA)
- European Commission

== Leadership ==
- Arthur Docters van Leeuwen, chairman June 2001–February 2007
- Eddy Wymeersch, chairman February 2007–July 2010
- Carlos Tavares, chairman August–December 2010
- Fabrice Demarigny, Secretary General 2002–2008
- Carlo Comporti, Secretary General 2008–2010

== See also ==
- European Commission
- Securities Commission
- European Commissioner for Internal Market and Services
- Financial regulation
