= Jean-Louis Duplat =

Belgian judge and lawyer (1937–2026)

President of Child Focus
- In office 2007–2016
- Preceded by: Daniel Cardon de Lichtbuer
- Succeeded by: François Cornelis

President of the Belgian Banking Commission
- In office 1989–2001
- Preceded by: Walter Van Gerven
- Succeeded by: Eddy Wymeersch

Personal details
- Born: 30 May 1937 Uccle, Belgium
- Died: 9 January 2026 (aged 88) Sint-Genesius-Rode. Belgium
- Education: Université de Namur; Catholic University of Louvain (LLD)
- Occupation: Judge; Lawyer

Jean-Louis Duplat (30 May 1937 – 9 January 2026) was a Belgian judge and lawyer.

== Life and career ==
Born in Uccle on 30 May 1937, Duplat was the son of lawyer Jan Duplat and Yvonne Colson, and grew up in a bilingual Dutch-French household. From 1957 to 1960, he studied at the Université de Namur and the Catholic University of Louvain, where he earned his Doctor of Laws. In 1960, he joined the Barreau de Bruxelles and joined the public prosecutor's office. In October 1974, he was appointed to the Court of Appeal of Brussels, where he headed the financial section of the public prosecutor's office. In 1978, he was named president of the Commercial Court, a position in which he rejected a bid by Carlo De Benedetti for a hostile takeover of the Société Générale de Belgique worth 20 billion Belgian francs.

In 1989, Duplat succeeded Walter Van Gerven at the presidency of the Belgian Banking Commission, dealing with important cases such as the takeover of the Compagnie Internationale des Wagons-Lits by Accor, the tender offer for Bank Brussels Lambert, and ABN AMRO's takeover of the Générale de Banque. He was succeeded by Eddy Wymeersch in 2001. After his time on the court, he held various board positions, including at Omega Pharma and Brantano Footwear. He also taught business law at the Université de Namur until 2005. In 2007, he succeeded Daniel Cardon de Lichtbuer as president of Child Focus, and was replaced by François Cornelis in 2016.

Duplat died in Sint-Genesius-Rode on 9 January 2026, at the age of 88.

== Decorations ==
- Grand Officer of the Order of the Crown
- Commander of the Order of Leopold
- Knight of the Legion of Honour
