= Committee of European Banking Supervisors =

Replaced by European Banking Authority in 2011

Agency overview
- Formed: 1 January 2004
- Dissolved: 1 January 2011
- Superseding agency: European Banking Authority
- Jurisdiction: European Union
- Headquarters: City of London, United Kingdom
- Website: www.c-ebs.org

The Committee of European Banking Supervisors (CEBS) was an independent advisory group on banking supervision in the European Union (EU), active from its establishment in 2004 to its replacement on 1 January 2011 by the European Banking Authority (EBA) which took over all its tasks and responsibilities following Regulation (EC) No. 1093/2010 of the European Parliament and of the Council of 24 November 2010.

CEBS was one of three so-called level-3 committees of the European Union in the Lamfalussy process, together with the Committee of European Securities Regulators (CESR) and the Committee of European Insurance and Occupational Pensions Supervisors (CEIOPS).

== Background ==
CEBS succeeded the Groupe de Contact (lit. 'Contact Group', generally referred to by its French name), an informal gathering of banking supervisors that had existed since 1972 and played a role in the establishment in 1974 of the Basel Committee on Banking Supervision. The Groupe de Contact continued activity, including after the establishment in 1998 of the European Central Bank and its Banking Supervision Committee, as a lower-level venue for addressing individual supervisory cases of common interest. The Groupe de Contact also produced studies that informed other policy processes, including at the global level through the Basel Committee. Upon the creation of CEBS, the Groupe de Contact was subsumed into it as one of the CEBS expert groups.

== Overview ==
CEBS was established by the European Commission by Decision 2004/5/EC, and held its first meeting on 29 January 2004. Its charter revised on 23 January 2009, CEBS was composed of senior representatives of bank supervisory authorities and central banks of the European Union. European Economic Area countries which are not EU members participated as permanent observers.

Its role was to:

- Advise the European Commission, on the latter's request, or within a time period the Commission may have set depending on the urgency of the matter, or acting on its own behalf, in particular as regards the preparation of draft measures in the scope of lending activities.
- Contribute to the consistent implementation of EU directives and the convergence of financial supervisory practices in all member states of the entire European Community.
- Improve supervisory cooperation, including exchange of information.

As part of the so-called Lamfalussy process, the Commission adopted Decision 2004/5/EC of 5 November 2003, establishing the Committee (OJ L 3, 7.1.2004, p. 28.).

The Committee took up its duties on 1 January 2004, serving as an independent body for reflection, debate and advice of the Commission in the field of banking regulation and supervision. [...] to establish a new organisational structure for financial services committees (OJ L 79, 24 March 2005, p. 9.), the Commission carried out a review of the Lamfalussy process in 2007 and presented its assessment in a Communication of 20 November 2007 entitled 'Review of the Lamfalussy process – Strengthening supervisory convergence' (COM(2007) 727 final.).

In the Communication, the Commission pointed out the importance of the Committee of European Securities Regulators, the Committee of European Banking Supervisors and the Committee of European Insurance and Occupational Pensions Supervisors (hereinafter the Committees of Supervisors) in an increasingly integrated European financial market. A clear framework for the activities of these Committees in the area of supervisory convergence and cooperation was deemed necessary.

While reviewing the functioning of the Lamfalussy process, the Council invited the Commission to clarify the role of the Committees of Supervisors and consider all different options to strengthen the working of those Committees, without unbalancing the current institutional structure or reducing the accountability of supervisors (Council Conclusions 15698/07 of 4 December 2007).

At its meeting on 13 and 14 March 2008, the European Council called for swift improvements to the functioning of the Committees of Supervisors (Council Conclusions 7652/1/08 Rev 1.).

On 14 May 2008 (Council Conclusions 8515/3/08 Rev 3), the Council invited the Commission to revise the Commission Decisions establishing the Committees of Supervisors so as to ensure coherence and consistency in their mandates and tasks as well as to strengthen their contributions to supervisory cooperation and convergence. The Council noted that specific tasks could be explicitly given to the Committees to foster supervisory cooperation and convergence, and their role in assessing risks to financial stability. Therefore a reinforced legal framework regarding the role and tasks of the Committee in this respect should be provided.

[...]"

— European Commission Decision 2004/5/EC

So the European Commission's decision (2009/78/EC) of 23 January 2009, "for reasons of legal security and clarity", repealed, in its 16th article Decision 2004/5/EC, which changed the legal framework of the committee.

On 1 January 2011, the committee was superseded by the European Banking Authority.

== Membership ==
Depending on national supervisory architecture, namely whether banking supervision was separate or not from the central bank, each member state had either one or two members in CEBS:

- Austria: Financial Market Authority (FMA) and Oesterreichische Nationalbank
- Belgium: Commission Bancaire, Financière et des Assurances (CBFA) and National Bank of Belgium
- Bulgaria: Bulgarian National Bank, from accession on 1 January 2007
- Cyprus: Central Bank of Cyprus, from accession on 1 May 2004
- Czechia: Czech National Bank, from accession on 1 May 2004
- Denmark: Finanstilsynet and Danmarks Nationalbank
- Estonia: Financial Supervisory Authority (Finantsinspektsioon) and Bank of Estonia, from accession on 1 May 2004
- Finland: Rahoitustarkastus then the Finnish Financial Supervisory Authority (FIN-FSA) from 1 January 2009, and Bank of Finland
- France: Bank of France
- Germany: Bundesanstalt für Finanzdienstleistungsaufsicht (BaFin) and Deutsche Bundesbank
- Greece: Bank of Greece
- Hungary: Hungarian Financial Supervisory Authority (PSZÁF) and Hungarian National Bank, from accession on 1 May 2004
- Ireland: Irish Financial Services Regulatory Authority (until 1 October 2010) and Central Bank of Ireland
- Italy: Bank of Italy
- Latvia: Financial and Capital Market Commission (FKTK) and Bank of Latvia, from accession on 1 May 2004
- Lithuania: Bank of Lithuania, from accession on 1 May 2004
- Luxembourg: Commission de Surveillance du Secteur Financier (CSSF) and Banque Centrale du Luxembourg
- Malta: Malta Financial Services Authority (MSFA) and Central Bank of Malta, from accession on 1 May 2004
- Netherlands: De Nederlandsche Bank
- Poland: Financial Supervision Authority (KNF) (from 19 December 2006) and National Bank of Poland, from accession on 1 May 2004
- Portugal: Bank of Portugal
- Romania: National Bank of Romania, from accession on 1 January 2007
- Slovakia: National Bank of Slovakia, from accession on 1 May 2004
- Slovenia: Bank of Slovenia, from accession on 1 May 2004
- Spain: Bank of Spain
- Sweden: Finansinspektionen and Sveriges Riksbank
- United Kingdom: Financial Services Authority (FSA) and Bank of England
- European Union: European Central Bank

Observers:

- Iceland: Financial Supervisory Authority (FME) and Central Bank of Iceland
- Liechtenstein: Finanzmarktaufsicht (FMA)
- Norway: Kredittilsynet (renamed Finanstilsynet in December 2009) and Norges Bank
- European Union: European Commission and the ECB's Banking Supervisory Committee

== Location ==
The office of the Secretariat of the CEBS was located in the City of London, UK.

== See also ==
- European Banking Authority
- Committee of European Securities Regulators
- Committee of European Insurance and Occupational Pensions Supervisors
- Financial regulation
- European Commission
- European Commissioner for Internal Market and Services
- Lamfalussy process
- 2010 European Union banking stress test exercise
- List of acronyms: European sovereign-debt crisis
