= National Securities Market Commission =

Body responsible for supervision of Spanish securities markets

- Comisión Nacional del Mercado de Valores (CNMV)
- Logo

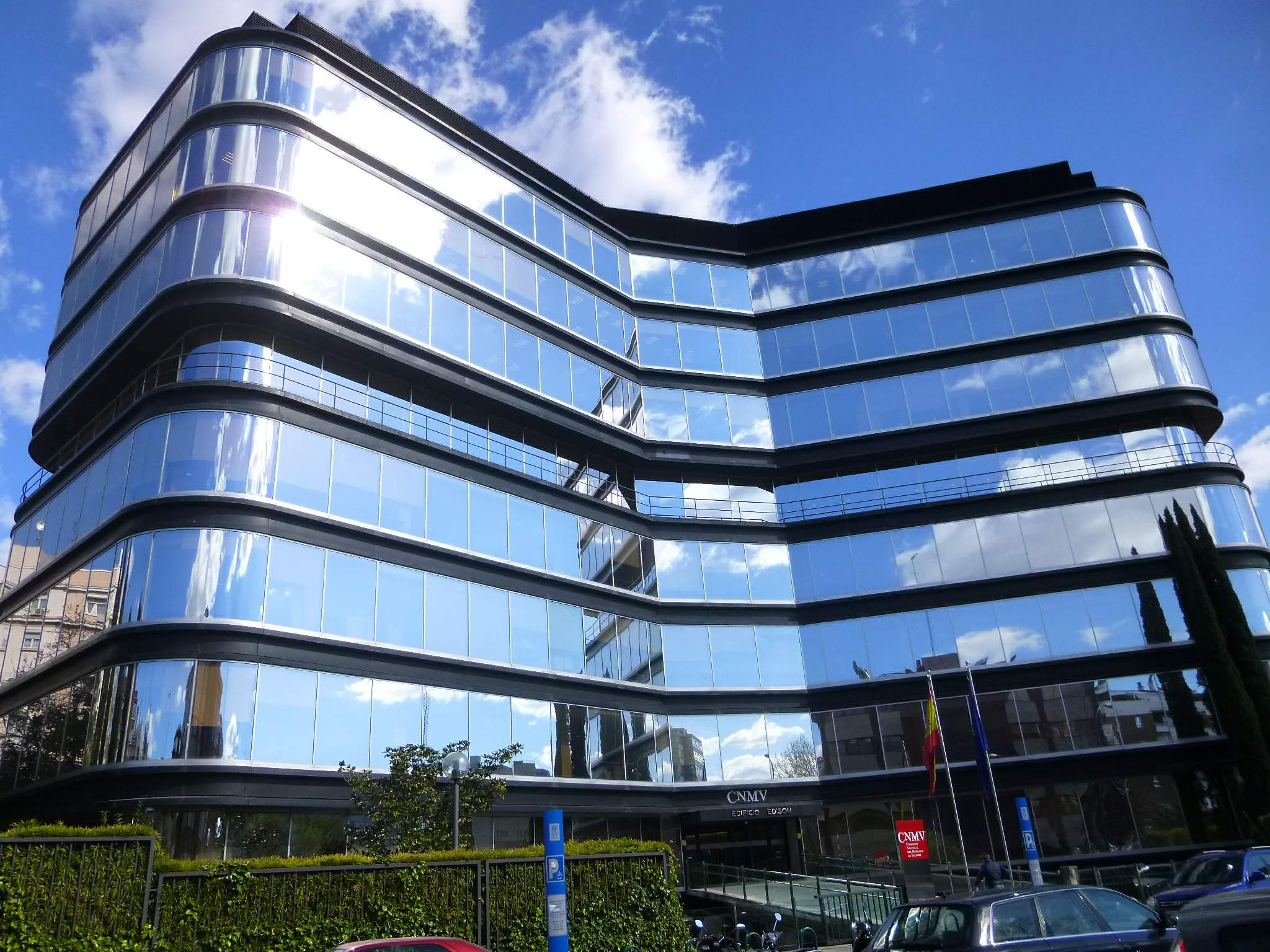
- Headquarters in Madrid

Agency overview
- Formed: July 28, 1988; 38 years ago
- Jurisdiction: Spain
- Headquarters: Madrid, Spain
- Agency executives: Carlos San Basilio, Chairman; Paloma Martin, Vice Chairwoman
- Parent agency: Spanish Ministry of Economy
- Key document: Securities Market Act of 2015 (in Spanish)
- Website: www.cnmv.es

The National Securities Market Commission (CNMV) (Spanish: Comisión Nacional del Mercado de Valores) is the Spanish government agency responsible for the financial regulation of the securities markets in Spain. It is an independent agency that falls under the Ministry of Economy.

Whereas it is governed under a national framework of accountability, the CNMV increasingly implements policies set at the European Union level. It is a voting member of the Board of Supervisors of the European Securities and Markets Authority (ESMA). It is also a member of the European Systemic Risk Board (ESRB).

== History ==
The CNMV was established in 1988 as part of a major reform of Spanish financial sector with the passing of law 24/1988 also known as the "Stock Market" act. Laws 37/1998 and 44/2002 have updated the powers and responsibilities of the agency establishing a regulatory framework to meet the requirements of the European Union. It also allowed for the development of the Spanish stock market in the European environment, incorporating new measures for the investor protection.

On 23 May 2008, the then second vice-president and finance minister, Pedro Solbes, announced in the Economic and Financial Committee of Congress that the government was planning a realignment of responsibilities for the regulation of the financial system as agreed by finance ministers of the European Union (ECOFIN). The project was expected to separate prudential and supervisory regulation to improve efficiency in monitoring the solvency and competitiveness of financial intermediaries as well as market transparency.

The Bank of Spain, would have taken over some of CNMVs responsibilities and would be required to ensure the creditworthiness not just of banks and savings banks, but also from other financial institutions, including insurance companies and investment institutions.

However almost a year and half after the announcement, on 19 September 2009, a digital newspaper that echoes the forecast said that the law on the unification of financial supervisors was due to reach Parliament in early 2010, but neither parliamentarians nor the bodies concerned had any time on their agenda to perform such a reform. According to sources from the Ministry of Economy, the restructuring will have to wait for a decision in the European Union, which is studying the matter with a view to adopting a common format that could actually be more similar the current system.

== Purpose and functions ==
The aim of the CNMV is to ensure stability and transparency of financial markets, protect investors and make sure that brokers and intermediaries behave correctly.

In exercising its powers the CNMV received a significant amount of information, much of which is contained in official records. This is considered public information.

Action by the CNMV as a supervisory body is mainly focused on:

- companies issuing securities to be placed publicly on the primary market
- participants in the secondary securities markets
- companies providing investment services and collective investment institutions

In addition the CNMV exercises prudential supervision by seeking to ensure that the system is solvent and transactions are secure. The CNMV is also responsible for assigning the ISIN codes for all securities issued in Spain.

Since 2022, new regulations have allowed the CNMV to specifically monitor advertising for all cryptoasset types and to include warnings about risks; advertisers and companies that market cryptoassets must inform the CNMV at least 10 days beforehand about the content of campaigns targeting more than 100,000 people.

== Economic data ==
The Spanish securities market was worth 22.65 million euros in 2007, an increase from 13.72 million euros in 2006 according to the supervisor's annual accounts published in the official gazette (Boletín Oficial del Estado).

== International activities ==
The CNMV's is a member of both the International Organization of Securities Commissions (IOSCO) and the Committee of European Securities Regulators (CESR) and is actively involved in both organisations and its working groups. They bring together the banking, securities and insurance sectors worldwide and within Europe respectively.

The CNMV also performs an important task of advising and assisting the Spanish authorities in their participation in the institutions of the European Union and is a regular adviser to the Directorate General of Treasury and Financial Policy and the European Securities Committee. It also participates in the review of company law and stock market participant.

It also provides technical assistance to the European Commission in assessing the financial sectors of accession countries that want to join the European Union.

In Ibero-America, the CNMV is working closely with the Iberoamerican Institute of Securities Market (IIMV) in helping to foster progress and modernization of securities markets in Latin America and developing training programs for cooperation.

The CNMV is also involved in the Iberian Electricity Market (MIBEL), which was established by agreement between Spain and Portugal in 2004, and in the Organisation for Economic Co-operation and Development (OECD), whose work on Principles of Corporate Governance it has been working with very actively.

== Structure ==
The CNMV consists of a Council, an advisory committee and an executive committee. In addition there are three general managers: one for monitoring entities, one for other market supervision and one for legal service.

=== Council of the CNMV ===
The CNMV is governed by a Board and consists of the following members:

- A President and Vice Chairman who is appointed by the Government based on advice from the Finance Minister, from among persons of recognized competence in matters relating to the securities market.
- The Director General of the Treasury and Financial Policy and the Deputy Governor of the Bank of Spain, which have the role of Trustees ex officio.
- Three members appointed by the Minister of Economy among persons of recognized competence in matters relating to the securities market.
- The Secretary, who can advise but cannot vote. They are the Director General of Legal Service.

Appointments lasts four years, following which may be renewed once.

=== CNMV Board ===
- Chairman: Carlos San Basilio
- Vice Chairwoman: Paloma Marín
- Commissioner: Ms. María Dolores Beato Blanco
- Commissioner: Mr. Juan Manuel Santos-Suárez Márquez
- Commissioner: Ms. Helena Viñes Fiestas
- Commissioner: Mr. Carlos San Basilio Pardo (General Secretary of the Treasury and Finance Policy)
- Commissioner: Ms. Margarita Delgado (Deputy Governor of the Bank of Spain)
- Secretary: Ms. Patricia Muñoz González-Úbeda

== See also ==
- Securities Commission
- International Organization of Securities Commissions (IOSCO)
- List of financial supervisory authorities by country
