= European Securities and Markets Authority =

Financial regulatory agency of the European Union

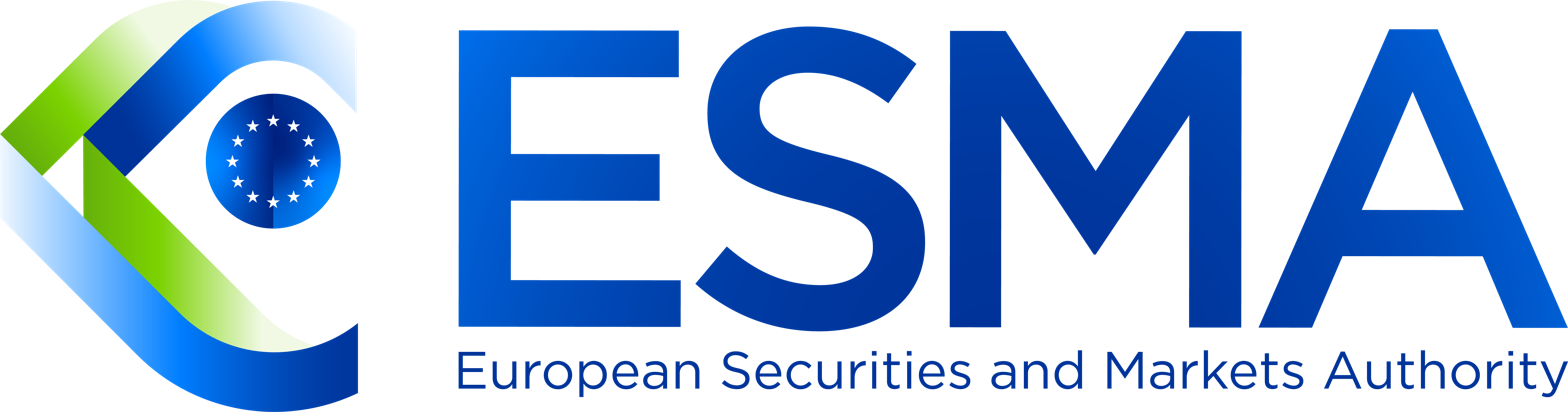
- ESMA Logo since January 2023

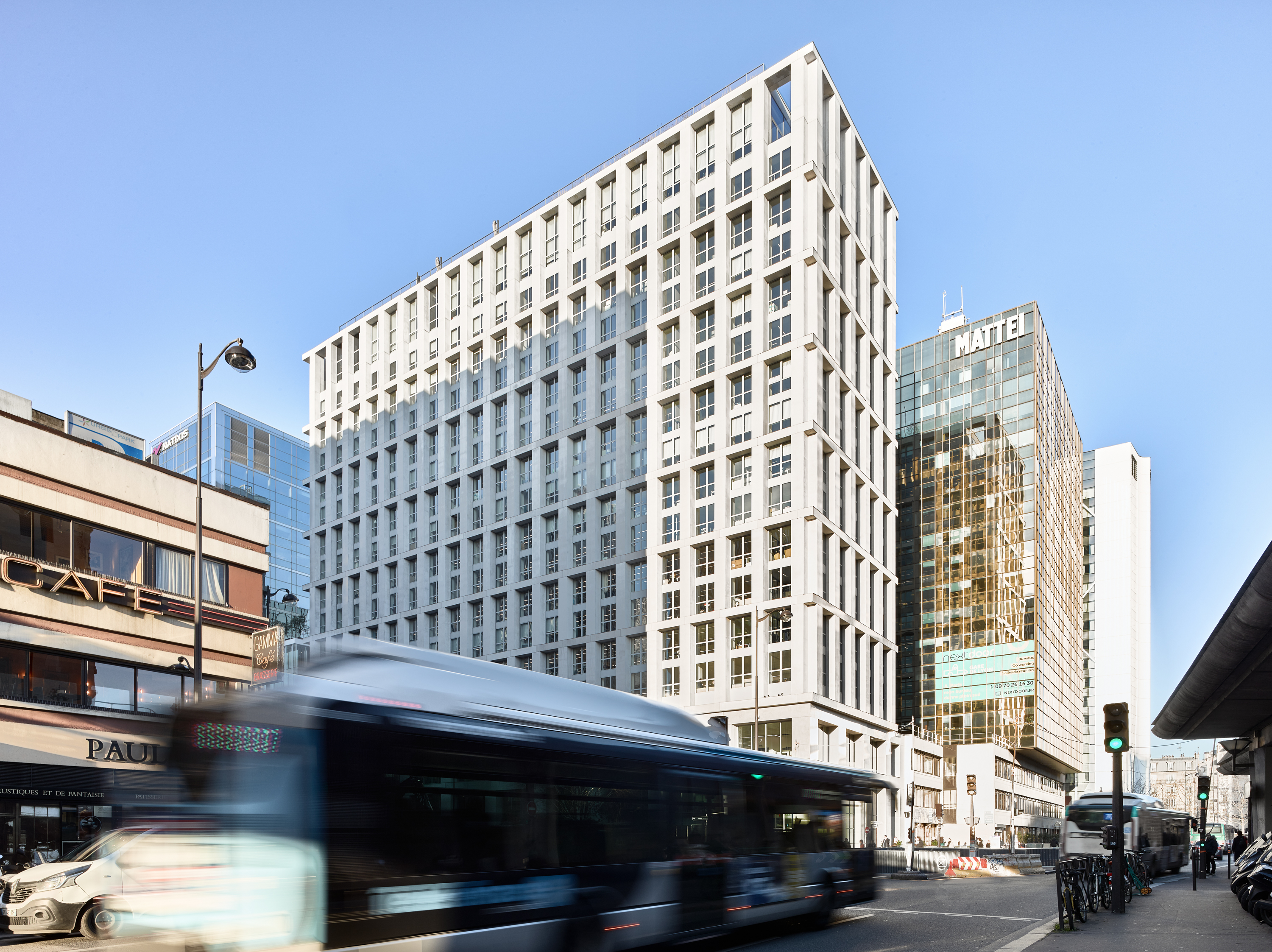
- Ibox building in Paris, seat of ESMA since 2019

Agency overview
- Formed: 1 January 2011
- Preceding agency: Committee of European Securities Regulators (CESR)
- Jurisdiction: European Union
- Headquarters: 201-203 rue de Bercy 75589 Paris France
- Employees: 358 (2024)
- Agency executives: Carlo Comporti, Chairperson; Natasha Cazenave, Executive Director
- Key document: Regulation (EU) No 1095/2010
- Website: www.esma.europa.eu

The European Securities and Markets Authority (ESMA) is an agency of the European Union located in Paris. ESMA replaced the Committee of European Securities Regulators (CESR) on 1 January 2011. It is one of three European Supervisory Authorities set up within the European System of Financial Supervision in Paris, together with the European Banking Authority (EBA) also in Paris and the European Insurance and Occupational Pensions Authority (EIOPA) in Frankfurt.

== Legal force ==
ESMA derives its legal authority from the 'ESMA Regulation', which formally defines the agency's mandate, scope of competencies, and the boundaries of its supervisory and enforcement powers. This regulation serves as the foundation for ESMA's ability to set standards, issue guidelines, and ensure consistent application of financial rules across EU member states.

== Mission and tasks ==
The ESMA regulation states in Article 1(5): "The objective of the Authority shall be to protect the public interest by contributing to the short-, medium- and long-term stability and effectiveness of the financial system, for the Union economy, its citizens and businesses." This mission is further specified in Article 1(6):

ESMA shall contribute to:

- (a) improving the functioning of the internal market, including in particular a sound, effective and consistent level of regulation and supervision
- (b) ensuring the integrity, transparency, efficiency and orderly functioning of financial markets,
- (c) strengthening international supervisory coordination
- (d) preventing regulatory arbitrage and promoting equal conditions of competition
- (e) ensuring that the taking of investment and other risks are appropriately regulated and supervised
- (f) enhancing customer and investor protection
- (g) enhancing supervisory convergence across the internal market

=== Direct supervision ===
Since its creation, ESMA's mandate has been progressively expanded as the European institutions put it in charge of more direct supervisory and oversight tasks. At its inception in 2011, ESMA was only in charge of the direct supervision of credit rating agencies. In 2014, the Securities Financing Transaction Regulation tasked ESMA with the direct supervision of trade repositories. In 2021 and 2022, ESMA was tasked with the direct supervison of some other key financial markets infrastructures, including some central clearing counterparties. In addition, ESMA is tasked with the supervision of other financial actors: the external reviewers of green bonds (since 2024), the providers of ESG ratings (starting in 2026) and the providers of the EU's consolidated tapes for bonds, for equities (shares and exchange-traded funds) and for over-the-counter derivatives.

== Composition and seat ==
ESMA is structured as follows: a Board of Supervisors; a Management Board, a Chairperson; an Executive Director; and a Board of Appeal - ESMA regulation Article 6. These roles are further specified in the Regulation. By law, its seat is in Paris (Article 7).

== History ==
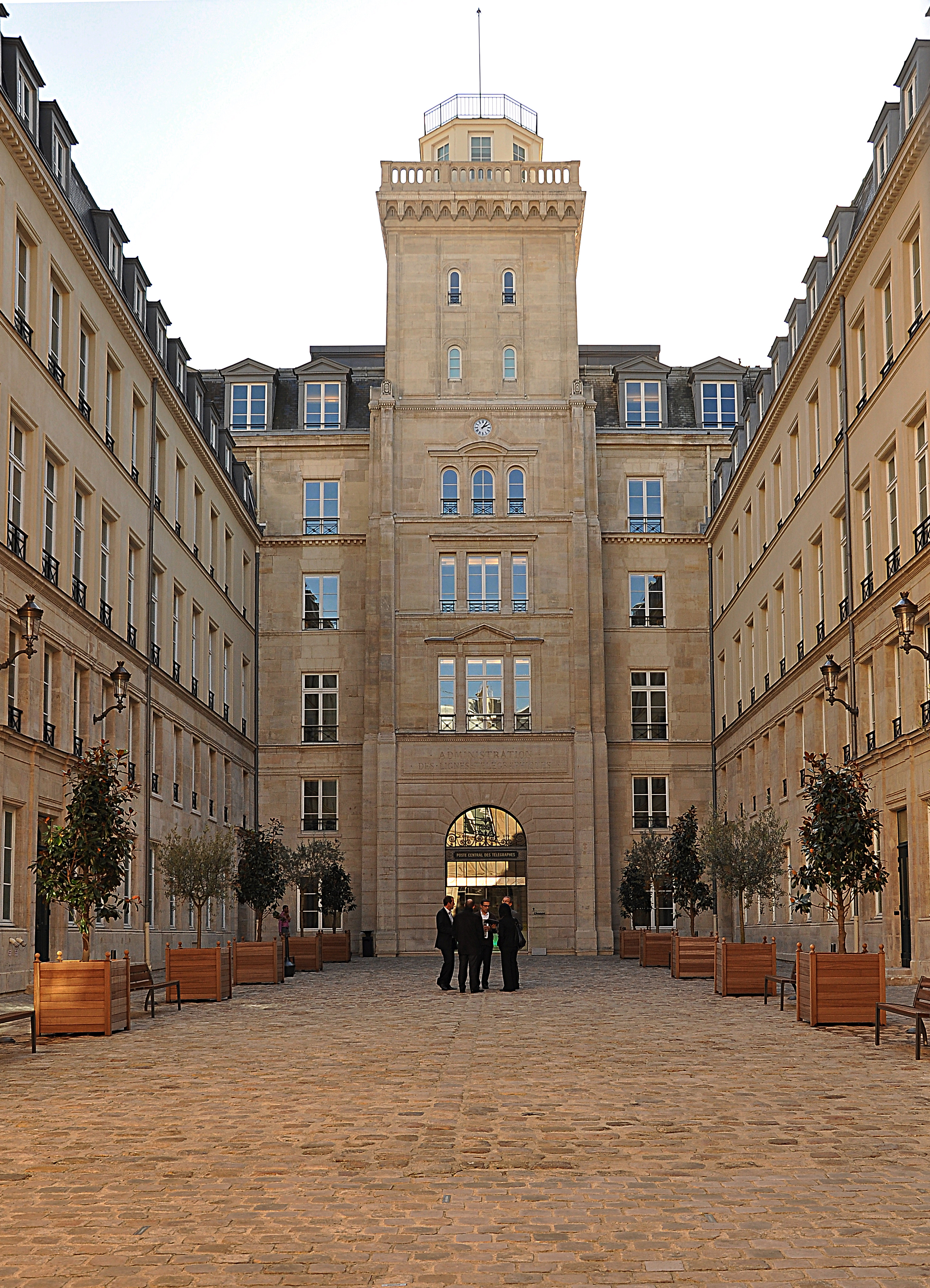
Former French Telegraphic Lines Administration at 103, rue de Grenelle in Paris, seat of ESMA from 2011 to 2019

ESMA was founded due to the effects of the 2008 financial crisis and the euro area crisis. In light of these major turmoils, the prevailing EU financial supervision framework put in place by Lamfalussy could not withstand the shock and was replaced by De Larosière regulatory framework. In 2011 in response to this crisis, what was known as the level 3 Lamfalussy agencies in this four-level framework, the 3L3 Committees (CESR, CEIOPS, CEBS) were replaced by the current European Supervisory Authorities (ESA, composed of ESMA, EIOPA, EBA) in the European System of Financial Supervision (ESFS).

However, this incremental change was subject to a whole new flow of criticism of the EU administrative landscape and, more specifically, the literature around agencification. In fact, scholars studied the rise of EU agencies with executive powers through a critical lens, as it raised questions on the democratic principle of the delegation of these powers to external agents, the threat toward the institutional balance of the EU, the impact on the European Parliament and the Council of the EU co-decision process, and the fragmentation it can cause within member states as capitals battle to host them.

ESMA formally came into existence on 1 January 2011, per article 82 of the ESMA Regulation. It started the first page of its history and enjoyed a succession of executive delegations from the commission starting with the Omnibus I (2010) and Omnibus II (2011), which made the ESA operational and gave ESMA the role of direct supervisor of credit rating agencies and trade repositories. Similarly, ESMA's role in overseeing environmental, social, and governance (ESG) rating providers can help ensure consistency in how these ratings are applied and interpreted across the European Union. In 2012, its competences were enhanced through the EU regulation on short selling and credit default swaps. The year 2014 marked an intensive regulatory pressure on financial markets. The MiFID II and MiFIR directives gave ESMA the responsibility of implementing technical standards in the financial markets. Its mandate includes investor protection and financial integrity and transparency with the Market abuse regulation (MAR), which is increasingly tied to ESG factors. Ensuring that ESG ratings are reliable and not misleading is an essential part of this role.

As of its growing power, they are heavily criticized by some member states. The most vocal of them was the former EU country, the UK. As a matter of fact, the growing weight of the agency was seen as a threat to national sovereignty and the matter grew to a litigation process in front of the European Court of Justice on the particular case of the possibility of ESMA to block short-sellings in time of crisis. UK argument, based on the Meroni case (case 9-56), was that this delegation of power was anti-constitutional and was a breach to national sovereignty. However, the ECJ held against UK in this matter reassuring ESMA of outmost trust in dealing with financial regulations in case of emergency.

Each of these regulations and judgements have served as a springboard and settled ESMA as a key player in the financial realm regulatory framework. However, if ESMA is said to be accountable, independent and competent in EU financial supervision, a glance on its relations and network signals potential conflict of interests while dealing with ESG investing. The surveillance of the ESMA is up the European parliament that still has a double discourse regarding agencification and might use this supervisory power for the sake of advancing a set of personal preferred policies. ESMA works in the field of securities legislation and regulation to improve the functioning of financial markets in Europe, strengthening investor protection and co-operation between national competent authorities. The idea behind ESMA is to establish an "EU-wide financial markets watchdog". One of its direct supervision tasks is to regulate credit rating agencies. In 2010, credit rating agencies were criticized for the lack of transparency in their assessments and for a possible conflict of interest. At the same time, the impact of the assigned ratings became significant not only for companies and banks but also for states. In October 2017, ESMA organised its first conference which was held in Paris. The event examined issues critical to European financial markets and was attended by 350 participants.

=== ESMA's product intervention measures ===
On 1 August 2018, the ESMA implemented modified trading restrictions concerning contracts for difference (CFDs) and spread betting for retail clients. The most significant change was that binary options will be completely banned, while the CFD leverage that retail clients can trade with will be restricted to 30:1 and 2:1, depending on the volatility of the underlying asset traded. These restrictions applied to traders categorized as retail investors only. Experienced traders, which fall under the category of professional clients, were excluded. This also meant that professional clients did not receive the same investor protections as retail investors. The restrictions, initially imposed as a temporary measure, were renewed on 1 February 2019, for a further three-month period. On 31 July 2019, the ESMA announced that it will not renew the restrictions after they expire on 1 August 2019, as all the EU member countries have managed to implement similar restrictions on the national level.

=== ESMA's supervision of ESG rating activities ===
The addition of overseeing Environmental, Social, and Governance (ESG) rating providers to the European Securities and Markets Authority's (ESMA) responsibilities can be seen as a coherent extension of its existing mandate and expertise. Its association through the proposal of a regulation on ESG ratings activities integrity and transparency therefore aligns with the aim to concentrate a comprehensive EU Finance Single Rulebook on the hand of ESMA. ESMA would have supervisory powers over ESG rating providers in addition to the supervision of credit rating agencies. Since there are similarities between supervisory functions, ESMA will have much more facilitated future supervision.

Under the proposed regulations, any entity wishing to offer Environmental, Social, and Governance (ESG) rating services within the European Union must obtain official authorization. Entities based in the EU are obliged to seek this authorization from the European Securities and Markets Authority. ESMA will grant authorization upon determining that the applicant meets the criteria outlined in the Proposal and the right to apply fines in case of non-compliance to the set of requirements on quality, integrity, independence and transparency.

=== ESMA's issuance of guidance ===
To ensure the consistent day-to-day application of Union law within ESMA's remit, ESMA issues and maintains "Guidelines (“GL”), Opinions (“OP”) and Q&As (“Q&As”)". As for the legal basis, the ESMA regulation specifically empowers ESMA to issue and maintain Guidelines and recommendations (Article 16), Opinions (Article 16a), and Q&As (Article 16b). As for Q&As, in February 2017 ESMA launched a process to allow stakeholders to submit a Q&A. Once scrutinised, if these Q&As are selected, they are published in English on ESMA's website.

=== Single Rulebook ===
In a major initiative designed to facilitate access to information, ESMA created an interactive single rulebook. It stated, "The Interactive Single Rulebook is an on-line tool that aims at providing a comprehensive overview of and easy access to all level 2 and level 3 measures adopted in relation to a given level 1 text. The purpose of the Interactive Single Rulebook is to facilitate the consistent application of the EU single rulebook in the securities markets area. ESMA's objective is to provide an interactive version for each key level 1 text under ESMA's remit over time."

=== Consolidated tape ===
The 2024 review of the Markets in Financial Instruments Regulation (MiFIR) introduced an EU-wide system of consolidated tapes for bonds, for equities (shares & exchange-traded funds) and for over-the-counter derivatives. This initiative is part of the EU's Capital Markets Union and aims at integrating the financial markets of the Member States into a unified financial market; the full rollout of the three consolidated tapes is expected for 2027. ESMA was tasked to set up these EU-consolidated tapes by selecting the providers of the three tapes and then supervise the whole system. Over the course of 2025 and 2026, ESMA selected the consortium Ediphy (fairCT) as the provider of the consolidated tape for bonds, the consortium EuroCTP as the provider of the consolidated tape for equity, and consortium Transparent Markets Europe as the provider of the consolidated tape for the OTC derivatives.

In September 2026, following authorization from ESMA, EuroCTP launched the EU consolidated tapes for shares and ETFs. The consolidated tape for bonds is due to be launched in January 2027, whilst the consolidated tape for the OTC derivatives is due to be launched in mid-2027.

== National competent authorities ==
In addition to the ESMA Chair, the following national competent authorities are voting members of the ESMA Board of Supervisors:

- Austria: Financial Market Authority (FMA)
- Belgium: Commission Bancaire, Financière et des Assurances (CBFA), then Financial Services and Markets Authority (FSMA) from 1 April 2011
- Bulgaria: Financial Supervision Commission (FSC)
- Croatia: Croatian Financial Services Supervisory Agency (Hanfa), from 1 July 2013
- Cyprus: Cyprus Securities and Exchange Commission
- Czech Republic: Czech National Bank
- Denmark: Finanstilsynet
- Estonia: Financial Supervisory Authority (Finantsinspektsioon)
- Finland: Finnish Financial Supervisory Authority (FIN-FSA)
- France: Autorité des Marchés Financiers (AMF)
- Germany: Federal Financial Supervisory Authority (BaFin)
- Greece: Hellenic Capital Market Commission (HCMC)
- Hungary: Hungarian Financial Supervisory Authority (PSZÁF), then Hungarian National Bank from 1 October 2013
- Ireland: Central Bank of Ireland (CBI)
- Italy: Commissione Nazionale per le Società e la Borsa (CONSOB)
- Latvia: Financial and Capital Market Commission (FKTK), then Bank of Latvia from 1 January 2023
- Lithuania: Lithuanian Securities Commission (2011), then Bank of Lithuania from 1 January 2012
- Luxembourg: Commission de Surveillance du Secteur Financier (CSSF)
- Malta: Malta Financial Services Authority (MSFA)
- Netherlands: STE (2001-2002), then Autoriteit Financiële Markten (AFM)
- Poland: Financial Supervision Authority (KNF)
- Portugal: Comissão do Mercado de Valores Mobiliários (CMVM)
- Romania: National Securities Commission (CNVM), then Financial Supervisory Authority (ASF) from 26 April 2013
- Slovakia: National Bank of Slovakia
- Slovenia: Securities Market Agency (ATVP)
- Spain: Comisión Nacional del Mercado de Valores (CNMV)
- Sweden: Finansinspektionen

Additional members of the Board of Supervisors include the Central Bank of Iceland (which replaced the Icelandic Financial Supervisory Authority on 1 January 2020); Financial Market Authority of Liechtenstein (FMA); and Financial Supervisory Authority of Norway. For the United Kingdom, the Financial Services Authority (FSA) was a member until 31 March 2013, then the Financial Conduct Authority (FCA) until Brexit on 31 January 2020.

== Leadership ==
ESMA Chair:

- Steven Maijoor (1 April 2011 – 31 March 2021)
- Anneli Tuominen (interim chair, 2021)
- Verena Ross (1 November 2021 – 31 October 2026)
- Carlo Comporti (since 1 November 2026))

ESMA CCP Supervisory Committee Chair:

- Klaus Löber (since 1 December 2020)

ESMA Executive Director:

- Verena Ross (2011–2021)
- Natasha Cazenave (since 1 June 2021)

== See also ==
- Capital Markets Union
- Banking Union
- MiFid II
- European Supervisory Authorities
- European Banking Authority
- European Insurance and Occupational Pensions Authority
- List of financial supervisory authorities by country
