= Finanstilsynet =

Finanstilsynet may refer to:

- Financial Supervisory Authority (Denmark)
- Financial Supervisory Authority of Norway
