= European Insurance and Occupational Pensions Authority =

European Union regulatory agency

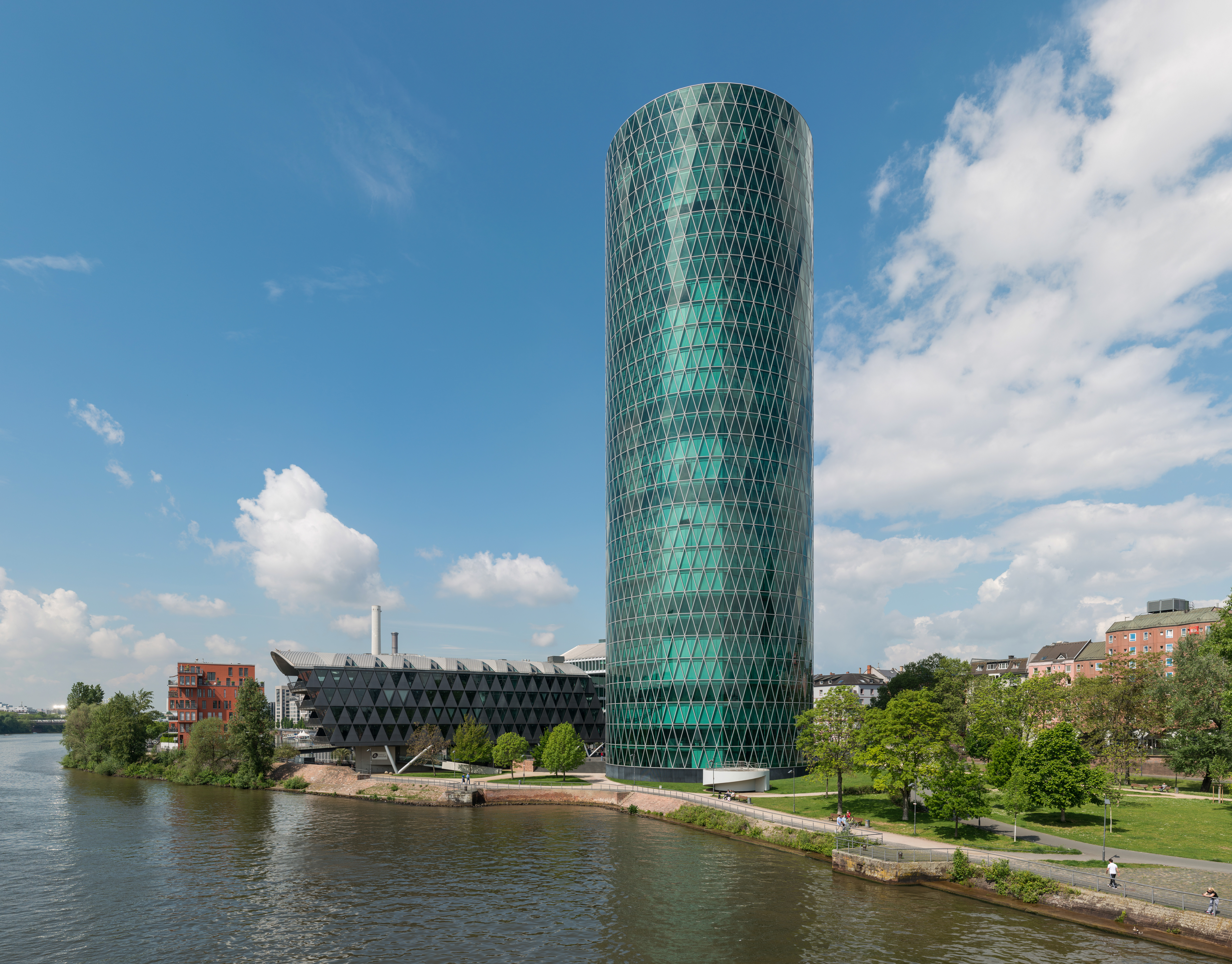
- Westhafen Tower in Frankfurt, seat of EIOPA since 2011

Agency overview
- Formed: 1 January 2011
- Preceding agency: Committee of Insurance and Occupational Pensions Regulators (CEIOPS)
- Jurisdiction: European Union
- Headquarters: Frankfurt am Main
- Agency executives: Petra Hielkema, Chair; Damian Jaworski, Executive Director
- Key document: Regulation (EU) No 1094/2010
- Website: eiopa.europa.eu

The European Insurance and Occupational Pensions Authority (EIOPA) is a European Union financial regulatory agency. It was established in 2011 under Regulation (EU) No 1094/2010.

EIOPA is one of the three European Supervisory Authorities responsible for microprudential oversight at the European Union level within the European System of Financial Supervision, together with the European Banking Authority (EBA) and European Securities and Markets Authority (ESMA).

== History ==
=== Background and establishment ===
The initial precursor of EIOPA was the Conference of the Insurance Supervisory Services of European Community Countries (French: conférence des services de contrôle des assurances), established in 1957 and thus predating both the Groupe de Contact for banking supervisors (1972) and the Chairs' informal group for securities commissions (1989).

The Committee of European Insurance and Occupational Pensions Supervisors (CEIOPS), a Level-3 Committee of the European Union under the Lamfalussy process, was established in 2004 under the terms of European Commission's Decision 2004/6/EC of 5 November 2003, later repealed and replaced by Decision 2009/79/EC. It was composed of high level representatives from the insurance and occupational pensions supervisory authorities of the European Union's Member States. The authorities of the European Economic Area Member States also participated in CEIOPS. CEIOPS Secretariat was located in Frankfurt. It was chaired by Gabriel Bernardino, the Director General of the Portuguese insurance supervisor. The other Level-3 Committees were Committee of European Banking Supervisors and Committee of European Securities Regulators.

CEIOPS was replaced by EIOPA on 1 January 2011, in accordance with the new European financial supervision framework. The reorganisation of macro and microprudential supervisory authorities led to the creation of three new European watchdogs (The European Banking Authority – EBA, the European Insurance and Occupational Pensions Authority – EIOPA, and the European Securities and Markets Authority -ESMA) have replaced the previous EU committees responsible for financial market services, having had only consultative competences.

=== Activities ===
In April 2026, EIOPA and the European Stability Mechanism published a joint policy paper advocating for the creation of an EU risk-sharing mechanism in order to expand insurance coverage of natural disasters, which are poised to happen more frequently and with increasing magnitude, due to climate change. This mechanism would be made of a €10 to €65bn natural catastrophe insurance pool, which would be funded by risk-based premiums paid by insurers and could be backstopped by a credit line from the ESM.

== Missions and tasks ==
EIOPA has legal personality and acts within the powers conferred by the EIOPA Regulation.

EIOPA acts in the field of activities of insurance undertakings, reinsurance undertakings, financial conglomerates, institutions for occupational retirement provision and insurance intermediaries, in relation to issues not directly covered in the acts referred to in the EIOPA Regulation Article 1.2, including matters of corporate governance, auditing and financial reporting, provided that such actions by the Authority are necessary to ensure the effective and consistent application of those acts.

EIOPA's core responsibilities are to support the stability of the financial system, transparency of markets and financial products as well as the protection of insurance policyholders, pension scheme members and beneficiaries.

To achieve the tasks above, EIOPA was also conferred the powers to develop draft regulatory technical standards and implementing technical standards, to issue guidelines and recommendations, to take individual decisions addressed to competent authorities or financial institutions in the specific cases, develop common methodologies for assessing the effect of product characteristics and distribution processes, and so on.

== Organisation ==
The composition of EIOPA is similar to that of ESMA, namely a board of supervisors, a management board, a chairperson, an executive director, and a board of appeal. Damian Jaworski has served as executive director since 1 April 2026. Besides the same tasks shared with ESMA, EIOPA still needs to foster the protection of policyholders, pension scheme members and beneficiaries.

== Location ==
The head office of EIOPA is still in the place of its predecessor, Frankfurt. EIOPA is accountable to the European Parliament and the council, like its two other peers, ESMA and the EBA.

== Board of Supervisors ==
The voting members of the EIOPA Board of Supervisors are representatives from the national competent authorities of EU member states, plus since reform in 2019 the EIOPA Chair.

- Austria: Financial Market Authority (FMA)
- Belgium: Commission Bancaire, Financière et des Assurances (CBFA), then National Bank of Belgium from 1 April 2011
- Bulgaria: Financial Supervision Commission (FSC)
- Croatia: Croatian Financial Services Supervisory Agency (Hanfa), from 1 July 2013
- Cyprus: Insurance Companies Control Service (Greek: Αρμοδιότητα της Υπηρεσίας Ελέγχου Ασφαλιστικών Εταιρειών)
- Czech Republic: Czech National Bank
- Denmark: Finanstilsynet
- Estonia: Financial Supervisory Authority (Finantsinspektsioon)
- Finland: Finnish Financial Supervisory Authority (FIN-FSA)
- France: Prudential Supervision Authority (ACP), renamed Prudential Supervision and Resolution Authority (ACPR) on 26 July 2013, integrated into Bank of France from 2017
- Germany: Bundesanstalt für Finanzdienstleistungsaufsicht (BaFin)
- Greece: Bank of Greece
- Hungary: Hungarian Financial Supervisory Authority (PSZÁF), then Hungarian National Bank from 1 October 2013
- Ireland: Central Bank of Ireland
- Italy: Institute for the Supervision of Insurance (IVASS) under the Bank of Italy
- Latvia: Financial and Capital Market Commission (FKTK), then Bank of Latvia
- Lithuania: Bank of Lithuania
- Luxembourg: Commissariat aux assurances
- Malta: Malta Financial Services Authority (MSFA)
- Netherlands: De Nederlandsche Bank
- Poland: Financial Supervision Authority (KNF)
- Portugal: Autoridade de Supervisão de Seguros e Fundos de Pensões (ASF)
- Romania: Insurance Supervisory Commission (CSA), then Financial Supervisory Authority (ASF) from 26 April 2013
- Slovakia: National Bank of Slovakia
- Slovenia: Insurance Supervision Agency (Slovene: Agencija za Zavarovalni Nadzor, AZN)
- Spain: Dirección General de Seguros y Fondos de Pensiones
- Sweden: Finansinspektionen
- United Kingdom: Financial Services Authority (FSA), then Prudential Regulation Authority from 1 April 2013 until Brexit on 31 January 2020

Additional authorities represented in the Board of Supervisors as of 2024, but without voting rights, include:

- Belgium: Financial Services and Markets Authority (FSMA)
- Cyprus: Registrar of Institutions of Occupational Retirement Provision (Greek: Έφορος Ταμείων Επαγγελματικών Συνταξιοδοτικών Παροχών)
- Greece: Ministry of Labour and Social Security
- Iceland: Central Bank of Iceland
- Ireland: Pensions Authority
- Italy: Commissione di vigilanza sui fondi pensione (COVIP)
- Liechtenstein: Finanzmarktaufsicht (FMA)
- Norway: Finanstilsynet

== See also ==
- European Banking Authority
- European Commissioner for Internal Market and Services
- European Insurance and Occupational Pensions Committee
- European Securities and Markets Authority
- European System of Financial Supervisors
- European Systemic Risk Board
- Financial regulation
- Lamfalussy process
- Solvency II
- List of acronyms: European sovereign-debt crisis
- List of financial supervisory authorities by country
