= European System of Financial Supervision =

European financial organization

The European System of Financial Supervision (ESFS) is the framework for financial supervision in the European Union that has been in operation since 2011. The system consists of the European Supervisory Authorities (ESAs), the European Systemic Risk Board, the Joint Committee of the European Supervisory Authorities, and the national supervisory authorities of EU member states. It was proposed by the European Commission in 2009 in response to the 2008 financial crisis.

There are three ESAs. They are responsible for microprudential oversight at the European Union level:

- The European Banking Authority (EBA) in Paris;
- The European Securities and Markets Authority (ESMA) in Paris; and
- The European Insurance and Occupational Pensions Authority (EIOPA) in Frankfurt.

To complement these authorities, the European Systemic Risk Board (ESRB) is responsible for macroprudential oversight across the European Union. It includes representatives from the European Central Bank (ECB), national central banks and supervisory authorities of EU member states, and the European Commission. The ESRB is based at the ECB in Frankfurt.

== History ==
The European Parliament, in September 2010, backed a deal to set up the European System of Financial Supervision replacing the Committees of Supervisors. The deal set up the EBA in London, ESMA in Paris and EIOPA in Frankfurt, after an initial agreement reached between the European Commission and member states in December 2009 had triggered parliamentary criticisms. The three institutions began operations on 1 January 2011 and replaced the Committees of Supervisors.

- The EBA replaced the Committee of European Banking Supervisors;
- ESMA replaced the Committee of European Securities Regulators; and
- EIOPA replaced the Committee of European Insurance and Occupational Pensions Supervisors.

== See also ==
- Financial regulation
- Capital Markets Union
- Banking Union
