= Polish Financial Supervision Authority =

Organization in Poland

- Urząd Komisji Nadzoru Finansowego

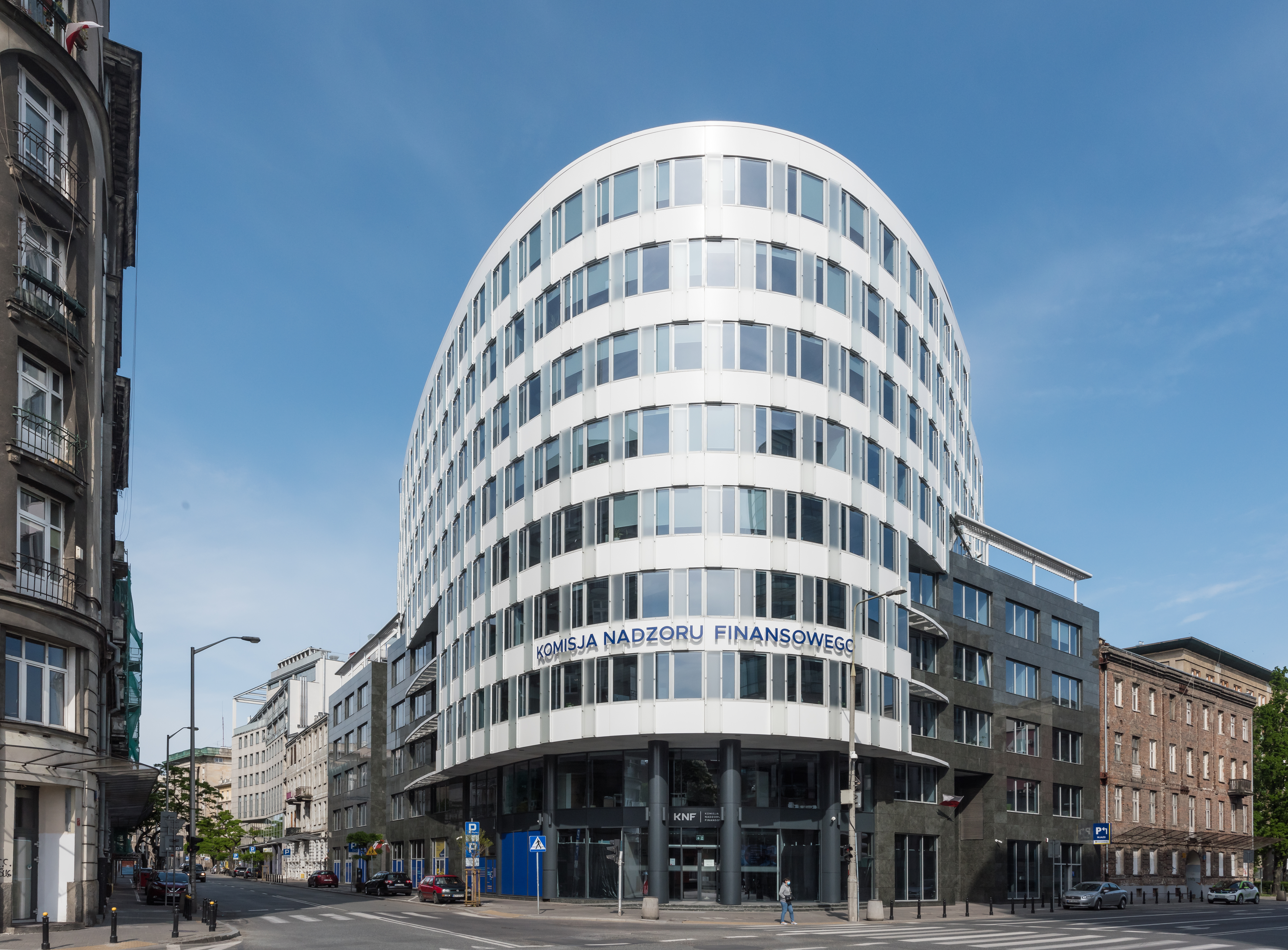
- Head Office at 20 Piękna St.

Agency overview
- Formed: 19 September 2006
- Preceding agency: Securities and Exchange Commission (Poland)
- Jurisdiction: Poland
- Headquarters: Warsaw, Poland
- Agency executive: Chairperson
- Website: http://www.knf.gov.pl/en/index.html

The Polish Financial Supervision Authority, in Polish Urząd Komisji Nadzoru Finansowego (UKNF) is the main financial supervisory authority for Poland. UKNF was established in 2019 as a separate legal person under public law. It hosts the Financial Supervisory Commission or KNF (Polish: Komisja Nadzoru Finansowego), established in 2006 by merger of several pre-existing specialized authorities. The chair of the KNF is simultaneously the head of UKNF. The UKNF's responsibilities include oversight of banking, capital markets, insurance, pension scheme and electronic money institutions.

Under European Union policy frameworks, UKNF is a voting member of the respective Boards of Supervisors of the European Banking Authority (EBA), European Insurance and Occupational Pensions Authority (EIOPA), and European Securities and Markets Authority (ESMA). It is also a member of the European Systemic Risk Board (ESRB).

== History ==
The KNF was formed on 19 September 2006 pursuant to the Financial Market Supervision Act of 21 July 2006. The new supervisory body took over the tasks of the Insurance and Pension Funds Supervisory Commission and of the Securities and Exchange Commission (Poland), which were abolished pursuant to that act.

From January 1, 2008, the second phase of the merger of financial supervision in Poland, the Polish FSA took over from the National Bank of Poland the powers of the Commission for Banking Supervision together with its office, the General Inspectorate of Banking Supervision.

The FSA is a publicly financed entity serving as the single contact point and watchdog for all segments of the Polish financial market. It has been credited with ensuring that Polish banks remained relatively healthy during the most recent global banking crisis by monitoring and responding to bank liquidity measures in the midst of the general slowdown in economic activity.

== Structure and Responsibilities ==
The Prime Minister of Poland (President of the Council of Ministers) appoints the chairperson of the KNF (and head of UKNF).

The UKNF exercises supervision over the banking sector, capital market, insurance and pension markets, supervision over payment institutions and payment service offices, electronic money institutions and the cooperative credit union sector.

The tasks of the Committee also include:

- taking actions aimed at the proper functioning of the financial market;

- undertaking activities aimed at the development of the financial market and its competitiveness;

- undertaking educational and information activities related to the functioning of the financial market;

- participation in the preparation of draft legal acts in the field of financial market supervision;

- creating the possibility of amicable and conciliatory settlement of disputes between financial market participants, in particular disputes arising from contractual relations between entities subject to UKNF's supervision and recipients of services provided by these entities;

- performing other tasks specified by law.

== See also ==
- Securities Commission
- National Bank of Poland
- List of financial supervisory authorities by country
