= European Insurance and Occupational Pensions Committee =

Regulatory policy body

European Insurance and Occupational Pensions Committee (EIOPC) is a regulatory and legislative policy body within the European Union. It was established by the European Commission's Decision 2004/6/EC of 5 November 2003.

== See also ==
- European Insurance and Occupational Pensions Authority
