= Carlos San Basilio =

Spanish economist (born 1965)

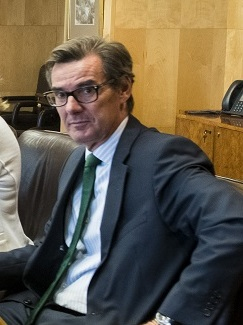
- San Basilio in 2020

Chairman of the National Securities Market Commission
- Incumbent
- Assumed office 8 January 2025
- Preceded by: Rodrigo Buenaventura

Secretary-General of the Treasury
- In office 19 June 2018 – 25 August 2021
- Preceded by: Fernando Navarrete
- Succeeded by: Carlos Cuerpo

Personal details
- Born: 23 September 1965 (age 60)

Carlos San Basilio Pardo (born 23 September 1965) is a Spanish economist and civil servant serving as chairman of the National Securities Market Commission since 2025.

From 2010 to 2012, he served as director-general of Cofides. In 2012, he served as director-general of state assets. He served as director-general of the Treasury from 2016 to 2018, and as secretary-general of the Treasury from 2018 to 2021. From 2020 to 2021, he served as vice president of the Economic and Financial Committee of the European Union. From 2021 to 2024, he served as managing director for corporate strategy of the European Bank for Reconstruction and Development.
