= Financial Services and Markets Authority (Belgium) =

Regulatory agency

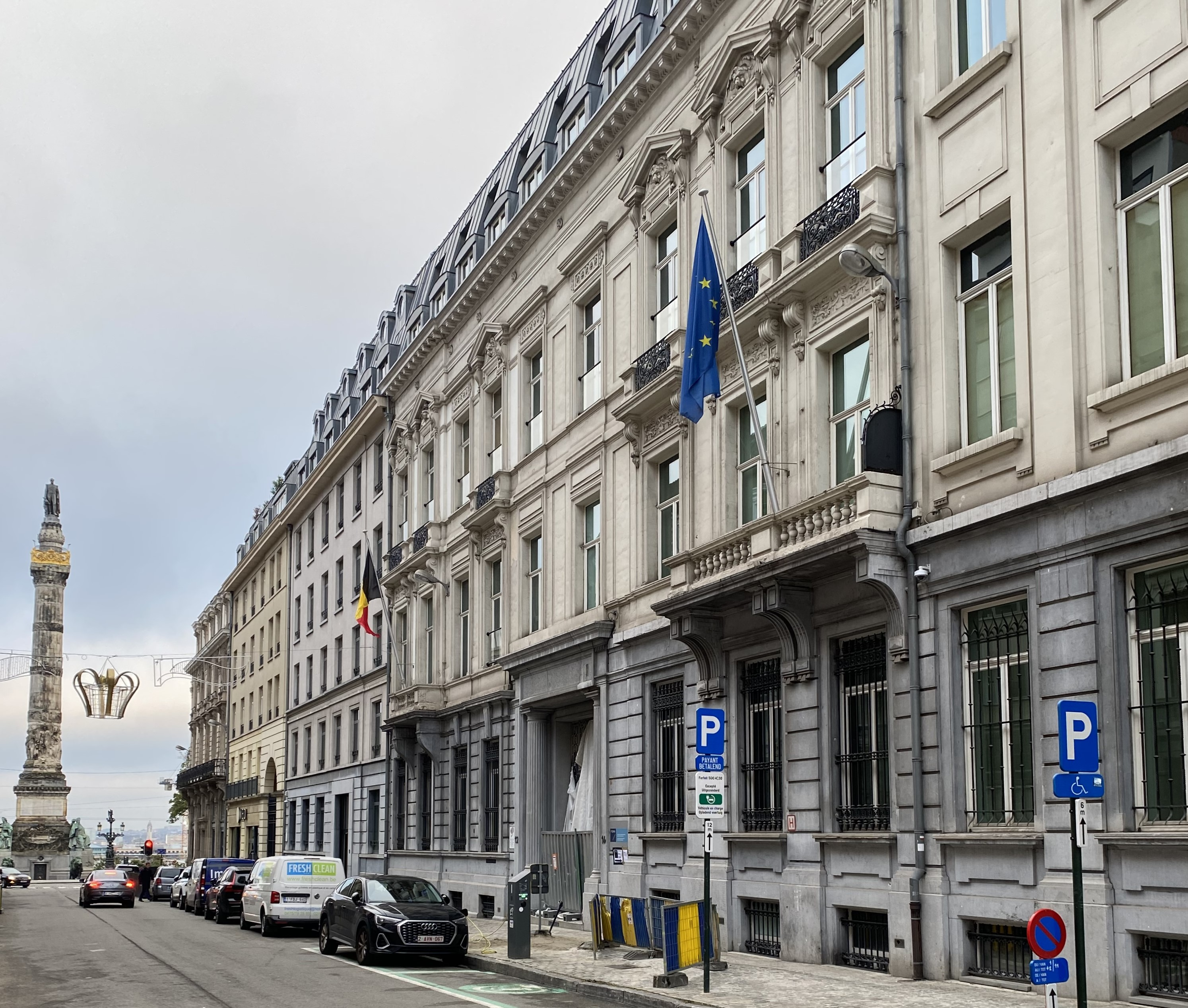

Agency overview
- Formed: April 1, 2011
- Preceding agency: Banking, Finance and Insurance Commission (Belgium)
- Jurisdiction: Belgium
- Headquarters: Brussels, Belgium
- Agency executive: Jean-Paul Servais, Chairman
- Website: www.fsma.be

The Financial Services and Markets Authority (FSMA) (Dutch: Autoriteit voor Financiële Diensten en Markten, French: L'Autorité des services et marchés financiers) is a financial supervisory authority in Belgium, headquartered in Brussels.

As a supervisory authority, the FSMA strives to ensure the honest and equitable treatment of financial consumers. It aims at the fair and orderly operation and the transparency of the financial markets by ensuring that listed companies provide correct and complete information. It promotes proper provision of financial services by verifying that financial institutions comply with rules of conduct, by supervising financial products, financial service providers and supplementary pensions, and by contributing to improving the education of financial consumers. In this way the FSMA seeks to ensure that the financial system deserves the trust of its users.

Under European Union policy frameworks, the FSMA is a voting member of the Board of Supervisors of the European Securities and Markets Authority (ESMA), and is also represented at the European Insurance and Occupational Pensions Authority (EIOPA). It is also a member of the European Systemic Risk Board (ESRB).

== History and status ==
The FSMA is, since 1 April 2011, the successor of the Banking, Finance and Insurance Commission (CBFA). Its full name is the Financial Services and Markets Authority (FSMA). The FSMA's status is that of an autonomous public institution. This means that it was established by law and that it carries out tasks in the general interest entrusted to it by Parliament. The members of the FSMA's governing bodies are appointed by Royal Decree for a period of six years. The FSMA staff have the status of (private sector) employees. The FSMA, alongside the National Bank of Belgium (NBB), supervises the Belgian financial sector. According to the new supervisory model that entered into force in 2011, the FSMA's competences fall within the following six domains: supervision of the financial markets and listed companies, supervision of rules of conduct, product supervision, supervision of financial service providers and of supplementary pensions, and contribution to improving financial education.

== Tasks ==
The FSMA has six principal tasks.

=== Supervision of financial markets and listed companies ===
The FSMA is responsible for the supervision of the financial markets and listed companies. This means among other things that the FSMA monitors the provision of information by companies listed on the stock market. The FSMA verifies that the company information is complete, gives a faithful image and is made available in a timely manner. In addition, the FSMA ensures that all shareholders of a listed company are treated fairly. Moreover, it ensures the smooth functioning of the financial markets by supervising market infrastructures such as Euronext Brussels. Specifically:

- In the case of a takeover bid, the FSMA sees to it that the rules are complied with.
- The FSMA ensures that financial information on listed companies is available to everyone at the same time.
- The FSMA can intervene in various ways if a company fails to comply with the rules (e.g. by publishing a warning, suspending the listing of a share, imposing a fine, etc.).
- The FSMA can investigate possible cases of insider dealing or market manipulation, and may impose sanctions.

=== Product supervision ===
Supervision of financial products is intended to ensure that the products offered to consumers are comprehensible and useful. It should also give consumers a better overview of the costs relating to the products. The FSMA takes initiatives to make financial products simpler and more comprehensible. All financial products offered to consumers come under the supervision of the FSMA. Product supervision is exercised in two ways: by supervising the quality of the information and advertising material for the financial products offered, and by supervising compliance with the regulations governing the products themselves. Specifically:

- Where securities are issued to the public in Belgium, the FSMA must give its prior approval to the prospectus or must determine whether the prospectus has been approved abroad;
- The FSMA supervises the operation and organisations of undertakings for collective investment (investment funds);
- The FSMA oversees the provision of pre-contractual information and the contractual terms and conditions for insurance products and mortgage loans;
- The FSMA may be given the right to approve advertisements for savings accounts, among other things;
- The FSMA verifies whether financial service providers respect the rules it has drawn up governing the marketing of structured products

=== Rules of conduct ===
The FSMA sees to it that financial institutions comply with the rules of conduct. These rules must ensure that the institutions treat their clients fairly, equitably and professionally. The rules apply to all financial institutions that offer products in Belgium, including banks, insurance companies and stockbroking firms that are required to obtain an authorization from the National Bank of Belgium. Financial institutions must have an appropriate organization and the requisite procedures in place to be able to guarantee that consumers of financial services and products are treated with due care and attention. This means, among other things, the provision of correct information, an appropriate management of potential conflicts of interest and best execution of clients' instructions. In addition, financial institutions may only sell those products that fit the clients' risk profile. Specifically:

- The rules of conduct must, for instance, ensure that clients do not fall victim to practices whereby a financial institution sells them a product that does not fit their risk profile or investment goals.
- The rules must guarantee that the interests of the financial institution do not prevail over those of its clients.

=== Financial service providers and intermediaries ===
The FSMA is responsible for supervising a wide range of financial service providers who are in direct contact with clients:

- intermediaries in banking and investment services and insurance intermediaries (agents and brokers);
- management companies of undertakings for collective investment,
- portfolio management and investment advice companies;
- currency exchange offices (bureaux de change);
- mortgage companies.

In due course, a decision will be taken on whether the FSMA should also be responsible for supervising financial planners, intermediaries that offer mortgage loans and institutions that provide consumer credit. Specifically:

- All brokers and agents must be registered as financial intermediaries with the FSMA.
- If someone wants to become an agent or broker in order to sell banking or insurance products, the FSMA checks whether that person is fit and proper for this activity.
- If the FSMA determines that someone is offering financial services without the requisite authorization, it publishes a warning to this effect and brings it to the attention of the judicial authorities.

=== Financial education ===
The FSMA is tasked with contributing to better financial education of savers and investors. Since the reform of the structure of financial supervision, it has gained additional competences in this area. Improved financial knowledge will enable individual savers, insured persons, shareholders and investors to be in a better position in their relationships with their financial institutions. As a result, they will be less likely to purchase products that are not suited to their profile. Specifically:

- The FSMA is developing an action plan for improving the financial knowledge of Belgians.

=== Pensions ===
The FSMA is responsible for supervising supplementary pensions that employees and the self-employed build up through their professional activities (so-called second-pillar pensions). The FSMA supervises compliance with the social legislation relating to second-pillar pensions, and also oversees the financial health of institutions for occupational retirement provision, which manage supplementary pension plans. Specifically:

- The FSMA handles complaints from members and beneficiaries relating to their supplementary pension rights.
- If an institution for retirement provision experiences a shortfall, the FSMA can require it to develop a recovery or consolidation plan in order to ensure that the shortfall is made up as soon as possible

=== Notification of substantial shareholdings ===
Having explained the FSMA's tasks in detail above. In details shareholders are required to notify their holdings to the FSMA when their stake exceeds or falls below certain thresholds. The initial threshold for the notification of substantial shareholdings in Belgium is 5%. Issuers having shares admitted to trading on a regulated market, for which Belgium is the home member state can stipulate additional notification thresholds, on the basis of article 18 of the law of 2 May 2007.

== International affiliations ==
The FSMA is represented on the international bodies that coordinate supervision, such as the International Organization of Securities Commissions (IOSCO) and the International Organization of Pension Supervisors (IOPS). Finally, the FSMA has signed numerous bilateral and multilateral collaboration agreements with fellow supervisory authorities. The FSMA also sits on a number of supervisory colleges that coordinate the supervision of market infrastructures.

== Leadership ==
Since inception in 2011, the President of the FSMA has been Jean-Paul Servais.

== See also ==
- European Securities and Markets Authority
- Markets in Financial Instruments Directive (MiFID)
- List of financial supervisory authorities by country

== Legal references ==
- Law of 2 August 2002 on the supervision of the financial sector and on financial services, as modified by Royal Decree of 3 March 2011.

== Other references ==
- Antoine Van Cauwenberghe, De sanctieprocedure van de FSMA na de twin peaks-hervorming van het financieel toezicht, in Financiële regulering in de kering : IFR-dagen 2011, Intersentia, p. 561-606.
