= Gabriel Bernardino =

Portuguese mathematician (born 1964)

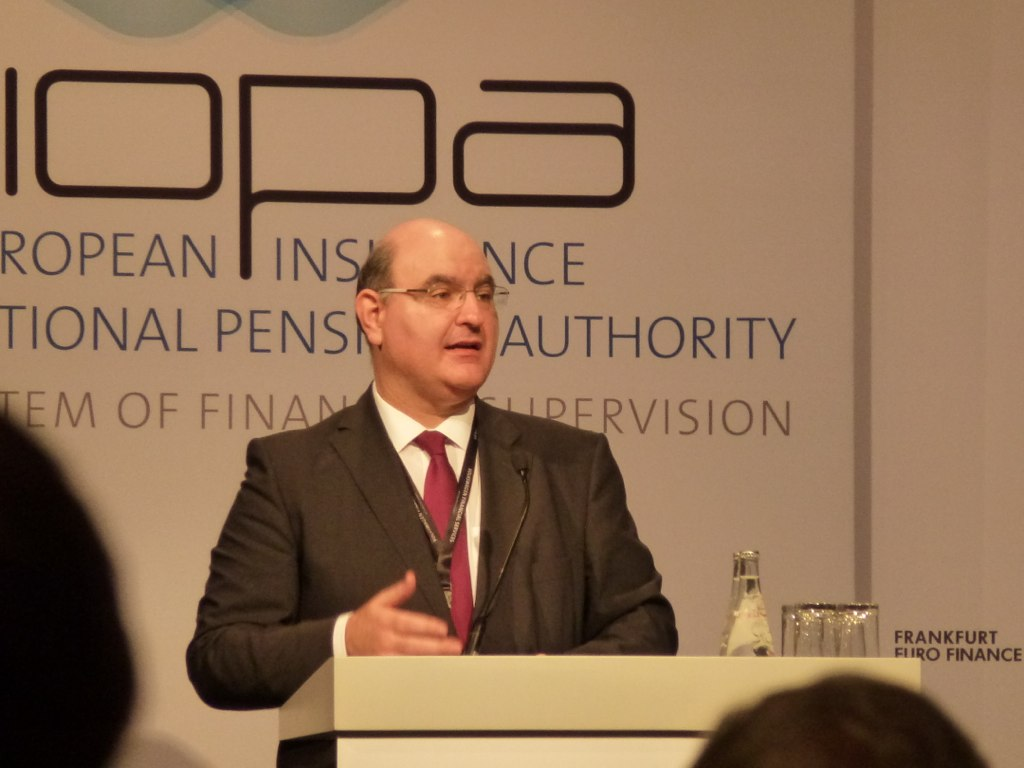
- Gabriel Bernardino speaking at the EIOPA Conference in 2012

Chairman of the European Insurance and Occupational Pensions Authority
- In office 1 March 2011 – 28 February 2021
- Preceded by: Position established

Chairman of the Managing Board of the Committee of European Insurance and Occupational Pensions Supervisors
- In office 2009–2011

Director General of the Directorate for Development and Institutional Relations at the Instituto de Seguros de Portugal
- In office 2007–2011

Personal details
- Born: 9 December 1964 (age 61) Bombarral, Portugal
- Education: Universidade Nova de Lisboa, Mathematics

Gabriel Rodrigo Ribeiro Tavares Bernardino (born 1964) is a Portuguese mathematician who has been serving as the chairman of the European Insurance and Occupational Pensions Authority (EIOPA) from 2011 to 2021.

== Early life and education ==
Bernardino was born in Bombarral, a village north of Lisbon. His father was a farmer. He holds degrees in mathematics and statistics from the Universidade Nova de Lisboa.

== Career ==
During Portugal's presidency of the Council of the European Union in 2007, Bernardino chaired the initial Council working group responsible for negotiating the Solvency II directive and the Accounting Expert Group. From 2009 to early 2011, he served as chairman of the managing board of the Committee of European Insurance and Occupational Pensions Supervisors (CEIOPS), EIOPA's predecessor.

Bernardino took up the post of chairman of the newly created European Insurance and Occupational Pensions Authority on 1 March 2011, for a first five-year term. His nomination followed a pre-selection of the European Commission and was confirmed by the European Parliament after a public hearing on 1 February 2011. On 16 December 2015, the European Parliament reelected Bernardino for a second five-year term, which started on 1 March 2016 and ended in February 2021. As Chairman of EIOPA, he was responsible for the strategic direction of the financial regulatory authority.

== Other activities ==
- European Systemic Risk Board (ESRB), Second Vice-Chair
