= Walter Van Gerven =

Belgian lawyer and law professor

Walter, Baron Van Gerven (11 May 1935 – 8 July 2015) was a Belgian lawyer and law professor. He served as Advocate General on the European Court of Justice between 1988 and 1994. He was professor of European law at the Katholieke Universiteit Leuven.

== Career ==
Van Gerven studied at the Katholieke Universiteit Leuven and later at Stanford University (United States). He returned to Belgium and spent several years as an assistant and later as a lecturer at the Catholic University of Leuven. After graduating he founded in Brussels the law firm De Bandt-Van Gerven, together with Jean-Pierre De Bandt. In 1967 he was promoted to full professorship, lecturing private law, European law and trade law. He was vice-rector of the Katholieke Universiteit Leuven between 1970 and 1976.

In 1982 Van Gerven became chairman of the Commission Banquaire, a predecessor to the Belgian Financial Services and Markets Authority. He became honorary chairman in 1988. Between 1988 and 1994 he was Advocate General at the European Court of Justice.

In 1985 he became foreign member of the Royal Netherlands Academy of Arts and Sciences. He was also member of the Royal Flemish Academy of Belgium for Science and the Arts.

In 1993 Van Gerven was granted hereditary nobility with the personal title of Baron. He took as heraldic device Met recht en rede, ("Justice and reason").

In 2000 he took emeritus status at his university. In 2012 he received an honorary doctorate from Leiden University.

On 8 July 2015 he died, aged 80.

== Publications ==
=== Books ===
- Verkoop met premie, in: Algemene Praktische Rechtsverzameling, Brussels, Larcier, 1958, 92 p. (Laureate University Contest).
- De investment trust in Belgë en Nederland, Louvain, 1959, 300 p. (laureate Prize of the National Committee for investments in shares).
- Het toegeven van premies in het klein-Europees handelsverkeer, Brussels, Bruylant, 1960, 280 p. (Fernand Collin Prize).
- Bewindsbevoegdheid. Rechtsvergelijkende bijdrage tot een algemene theorie van bewind over andermans vermogen, Brussels, Bruylant, 1962, 434 p. (Emiel van Dievoet Prize).
- Principes du droit des ententes de la CEE, Brussels, Bruylant, 1966, 370 p.
- Les accords entre entreprises dans le droit des ententes de la CEE, Heule, Ed. U.G.A., 1966, 75 p.
- (ed., with R. Dillemans) Beginselen van Belgisch Privaatrecht, Algemeen deel, Antwerp, Standaard Wetenschappelijke Uitgeverij, 1969, 519 p., heruitgave 2010.
- Het beleid van de rechter, Standaard Wetenschappelijke Uitgeverij & W.E.J. Tjeenk Willink, Antwerp/Zwolle, 1973, 166 p.
- (ed., with R. Dillemans) Handels- en Economisch Recht, deel 1: Ondernemingsrecht, in: Beginselen van Belgisch Privaatrecht, Antwerp/Amsterdam, S.W.U., 1975, 584 p.
- De taak van de rechter in een West-Europese democratie, Antwerp/Deventer, Kluwer, 1977,26 p.
- Leerboek Handels- en Economisch Recht, deel I, S.W.U., Antwerpen/Amsterdam, 1978, 259 p.
- Leerboek Handels- en Economisch Recht, deel II, S.W.U., Antwerp/Amsterdam, 1978, 248 p.
- Leerboek Handels- en Economisch Recht, deel III, S.W.U., Antwerp/Amsterdam, 1979, 250 p.
- Beginselen van behoorlijk handelen, Story-Scientia/Tjeenk Willink, Ghent/Deventer, Story Recht, 1983, 21 p.
- Verbintenissenrecht, Leidraad bij de colleges, 2 delen, Louvain, Acco, 1983 (1ste uitgave), 360 p., (with W. Wilms) and 1984 (2de uitgave), 360 p. (with W. Wilms).
- Hoe blauw is het bloed van de Prins? De overheid in het verbintenissenrecht, Antwerp, Kluwer rechtswetenschappen, 1984, 89 p.
- Handels- en Economisch Recht, deel 2A, Mededingingsrecht: Handelspraktijken, in: Beginselen van Belgisch Privaatrecht, XIII, Ghent, Story, 1985, 281 p., (with J. Stuyck).
- Handels- en Economisch Recht, deel 2B, Mededingingsrecht: Kartelrecht, in: Beginselen van Belgisch Privaatrecht, Ghent, Story, 1985, 518 p., (with M. Maresceau en J. Stuyck).
- Verbintenissenrecht, Leidraad bij de werkcolleges, Documentatie (2 vol.), Louvain, Acco, 1986, 196 p., (with S. Stijns).
- Met recht en rede, Toelt, Lannoo, 1987, 240 p. (De Standaard Prize).
- Verbintenissenrecht, Leidraad bij de colleges, Louvain, Acco, deel 2, 3de herziene uitgave, 1988, 274 p., (with S. Stijns en G. t'Jonck).
- Handels- en Economisch recht, dl. I, Ondernemingsrecht, in: Beginselen van Belgisch Privaatrecht, 3de herz. uitgave, 1989 (with H. Cousy en J. Stuyck).
- (with M. Eyskens & R. Dillemans) Wegwijs Geld, Louvain, Davidsfonds, 1990, 669 p.
- Verbintenissenrecht, Leidraad bij de colleges, boekdeel 1: verbintenissen uit overeenkomsten, eenzijdige rechtshandelingen en quasi-contracten, volledig vernieuwde uitgave, Louvain, Acco, 1991, 205 p.
- Verbintenissenrecht, leidraad bij de colleges, boekdeel 1: Verbintenissen uit meerzijdige en eenzijdige rechtshandelingen; boekdeel 2: Verbintenissen uit de wet; boekdeel 3 (with E. Dirix): De Verbintenis in het algemeen, Louvain, Acco, herz. uitgave 1992-93.
- Verbintenissenrecht, verzameling rechtspraak, 3 dln., Louvain, Acco, volledig herziene uitgave 1993.
- Verbintenissenrecht, leidraad bij de colleges, boekdeel 1 en boekdeel 3 (with E. Dirix), 1995–96, p. 1-192 en 343-491.
- Kartelrecht, in: Beginselen van Belgisch Privaatrecht, vol. XIII, 2B, Ghent, StoryScientia, 1996, 1089 p., (with L. Gyselen, M. Maresceau, J. Steenbergen, J. Stuyck).
- Verbintenissenrecht, leidraad bij de colleges, delen 1 en 2, vijfde herziene uitgave, deel 3 (with E. Dirix), zesde herziene uitgave, Louvain, Acco, 1997–98, 498 p.
- Verbintenissenrecht, leidraad bij de colleges, deel 1, Louvain, Acco 1998-1999, 209 p.; Deel 2, Louvain, Acco, 1999, 2000, 195 p.
- Cases, materials and text on national, supranational and international tort law. Scope of Protection, in: Ius Commune Casebooks for the Common Law of Europe, Oxford, Hart Publishing, 1998, 494 p. (with J. Lever, P. Larouche, C. von Bar & G. Viney).
- Cases, materials and text on national, supranational and international tort law, in: Ius Commune Casebooks for the Common Law of Europe, Oxford, Hart Publishing, 2001, 1020 p. (with J. Lever & P. Larouche).
- Verbintenissenrecht, leidraad bij de colleges, Louvain, Acco, deel 1, 1998–99, 209 p. deel 2, 1999-2000, 195 p.
- Cases, materials and text on national, supranational and international tort law, in: Ius Commune Casebooks for the Common Law of Europe, Oxford, Hart Publishing, 2001, 1020 p. (with J. Lever & P. Larouche).
- The European Union. A Polity of States and Peoples, Oxford, Hart Publishing, 2005, 397 p.
- Verbintenissenrecht, Louvain, Acco, 2001, 459 p. (with S. Covemaeker), herwerkt in 2006, 728 p., en in 2010.
- The European Union: a policy of states and peoples, Oxford, Hart Publishing, 2005.
- Verbintenissenrecht, Acco, Louvain, 2006, 728 p. (with S. Covemaeker).
- Algemeen Deel. Veertig jaar later. Privaat- en publiekrecht in een meergelaagd kader van regelgeving, rechtsvorming en regeltoepassing, Reeks 'Beginselen van Belgisch Privaatrecht', nr. 1., Malines, Kluwer, 2010, 603 p. (i.s.m. S. Lierman).
- Verbintenissenrecht (with A. Van Oevelen), Acco, Leuven, 2015.

=== Articles ===
- Ethical and political responsibility of EU Commissioners, in: C.M.L.R. 37, 2000, 1-6.
- Of Rights, Remedies and Procedures, in: C.M.L.R. 37, 2000, 501-536.
- Managing the European Union: for better or for worse, in: B.S. Markesinis (ed.), The Clifford Chance Millennium Lectures. Coming together of the Common Law and the Civil Law, Hart Publishing, Oxford, 2000, p. 91-104.
- A Common Law for Europe: the Future meeting the Past?, in: European Review for Private Law, 2001, 485-503.
