= Eddy Wymeersch =

Belgian economist

- Born: August 1, 1943
- Education: University of Ghent, Harvard Law School

Eddy Wymeersch is former chair of the Committee of European Securities Regulators (CESR), former chairman of the Supervisory Board of the Banking, Finance and Insurance Commission (Belgium), Brussels; Chairman of the European Regional Committee and Member of the Executive Committee and of the Technical Committee of the International Organization of Securities Commissions.

== Career ==
Wymeersch has held several public functions in Belgium. He is a member of the European Corporate Governance Forum and member of the Belgian High level Committee for a new Financial Architecture. He is the current chairman of the European Corporate Governance Institute.

He is emeritus professor of commercial law, University of Ghent, Belgium, teaching on company law, securities regulation and banking law and co-founder of the Financial Law Institute, University of Ghent. Wymeersch was also co-chair of the CESR-ESCB Working group on clearing and settlement.

He has been consultant to the EU Commission, World Bank and IFC; a member of the corporate governance commission of the Brussels Stock Exchange and chairman of the SLIM working party (Simpler Legislation for the Internal Market) on the 1st and 2nd directive.

Wymeersch has been an adviser to the Belgian Government - as member of the Legislative Branch of the Council of State. He was a member of the supervisory board of the National Bank of Belgium and the Belgian Corporate Governance Commission. He was chairman of the board of Brussels International Airport Company (BIAC) and adviser on governance issues to several listed Belgian companies.

He was also a member of the board of the Belgian-Luxemburg Exchange Control (Institut Belgo-Luxembourgeois du Change), chaired by the governor of the Belgian National Bank, until November 2002 when this institution was dissolved (Euro).

Additionally, Mr Wymeersch has been a member of the Beirat of the Max Planck Institute for Comparative and International Private Law in Hamburg and a member of the editorial or advisory boards of several Belgian and European law reviews.

He has published widely on securities regulation, companies law and corporate governance.

Mr Wymeersch studied law at Ghent University and Harvard Law School.

== Publications ==
=== Books ===
- Comparative Corporate Governance: Essays and Materials, 1997 ISBN 978-3-11-015765-9
- Capital Markets and Company Law, 2003 ISBN 978-0-19-925558-0
- Investor Protection in Europe: Corporate Law Making - The MiFID and Beyond, 2006 ISBN 978-0-19-920291-1

=== Articles ===
- International Securities Regulation : Belgium, in Robert C. Rosen, Irving M. Pollack and William B. Haseltine (eds.), ISR (Oceana Publications, Dobbs Ferry, N.Y. 1988).
- With Catherine Terrier, De Commissie voor het Bank-, Financie- en Assurantiewezen en de financieel-economische recherche - De noodzaak voor een integere en betrouwbare financiële sector, in Michel J. de Samblanx et al., L'enquête en matière financière et économique (Politeia, Brussels 2004), pp. 69–85.
