= Danish Financial Supervisory Authority =

Coordinates: 55.7068°N 12.5880°E

- Finanstilsynet

Agency overview
- Formed: January 1, 1988
- Jurisdiction: Denmark
- Headquarters: Copenhagen, Denmark
- Agency executive: Ulrik Nødgaard, Director General
- Website: http://www.finanstilsynet.dk

The Danish Financial Supervisory Authority (DFSA) (Danish: Finanstilsynet) is the financial regulatory authority of the Danish government responsible for the regulation of financial markets in Denmark.

Finanstilsynet is part of the Ministry of Economic and Business Affairs and also acts as secretariat for the Financial Business Council, the Danish Securities Council and the Money and Pension Panel.

Under European Union policy frameworks, Finanstilsynet is a voting member of the respective Boards of Supervisors of the European Banking Authority (EBA), European Insurance and Occupational Pensions Authority (EIOPA), and European Securities and Markets Authority (ESMA). It is also a member of the European Systemic Risk Board (ESRB).

== History ==
Finanstilsynet was established on the 1 Jan 1988 with the merger of the Supervisory Authority for Banks and Savings Banks and the Insurance Supervisory Authority.

In January 1990, the Supervisory Authority for Mortgage Credit Institutions was transferred to Finanstilsyne from the Danish Housing Agency. However political responsibility for mortgage credit remained with the ministry of housing and so Finanstilsynet reported to both the Minister for Housing and the Minister for Economic Affairs until 1994 when political responsibility was passed to the Minister for Economic Affairs.

In November 2001 the Ministry of Economic Affairs merged with the Ministry of Business and Industry. Since then the Minister of Economic and Business Affairs has been responsible for Finanstilsynet.

== Responsibilities and functions ==
It is responsible for regulation, supervision and collecting statistics of financial participants. These include; banks, stock exchanges, securities and money market brokers, clearing and registration organizations, insurance companies, pension funds, insurance brokers, investment companies and investment associations.

Its stated aims are to:

- strengthen the market's role as a disciplinary factor through enhanced transparency
- intensify management's consideration of the risk profile
- improve consumers' possibilities to compare prices and products among companies.

== Organization structure ==
Finanstilsynet is run by an executive management team that report to the minister of Economic and business affairs. The executive is made up of a Director general and three deputy director generals. Each deputy is assigned a subsection of the responsibilities of the agency.

== International ==
Finanstilsynet is also a member of the International Organization of Securities Commissions (IOSCO), and is a signatory of the IOSCO multilateral Memorandum of Understanding (MoU) to cooperate with other countries securities commissions.

== See also ==
- Danmarks Nationalbank
- Economy of Denmark
- Securities Commission
- Category:Banks of Denmark
- List of financial supervisory authorities by country
