= Polish Securities and Exchange Commission =

Government regulatory body overseeing the stock market

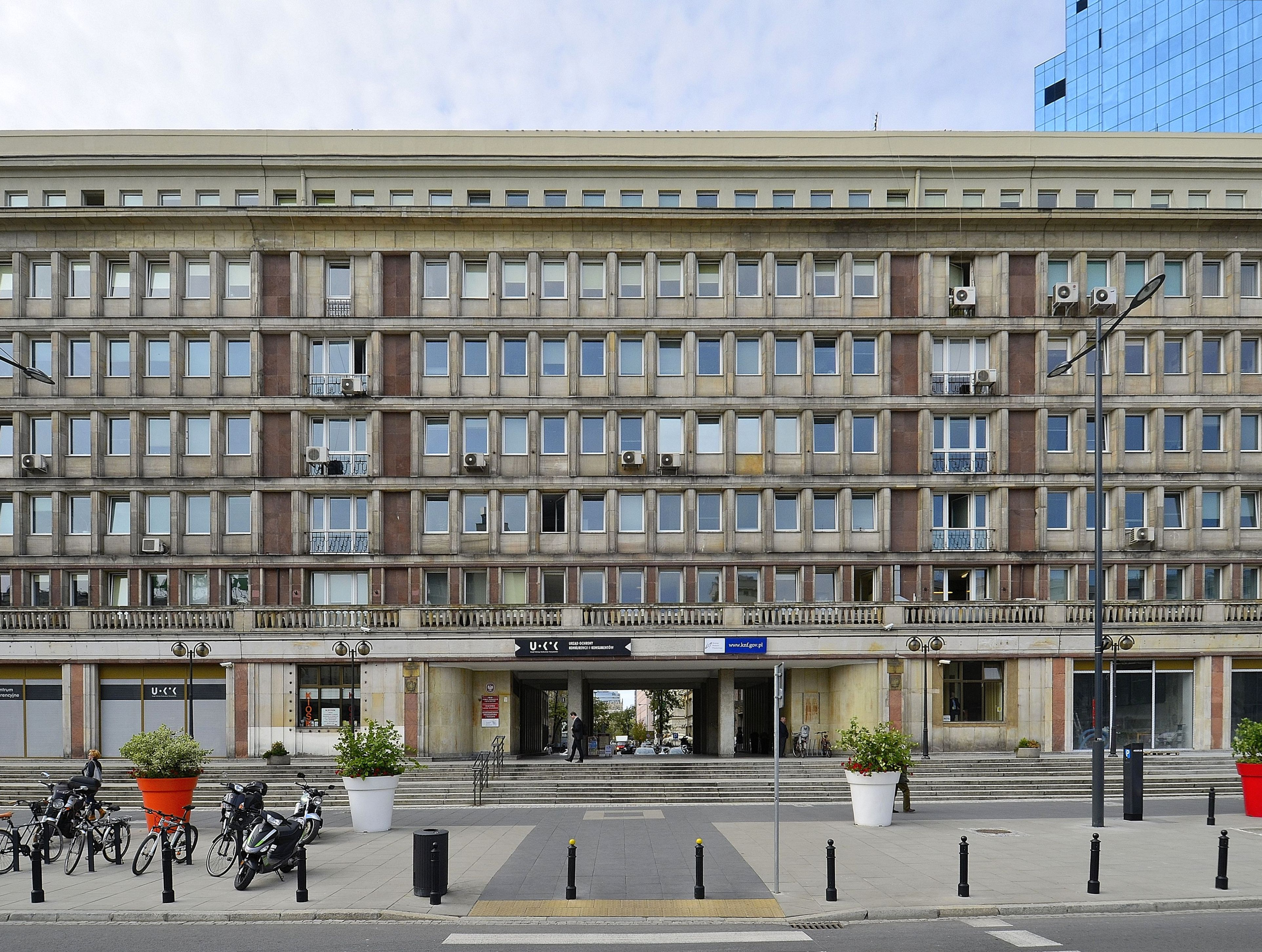

Agency overview
- Dissolved: September 2006
- Superseding agency: Absorbed into the Polish Financial Supervision Authority
- Headquarters: Warsaw, Poland
- Agency executive: Jacek Socha
- Website: web.archive.org/web/20050721084817/http://www.kpwig.gov.pl/

The Polish Securities and Exchange Commission (Polish: Komisja Papierów Wartościowych i Giełd; KPWiG) was the financial government agency responsible for supervising compliance with regulations governing honest trade and competition until 2006 when it was absorbed into the Polish Financial Supervision Authority.

The KPWiG was also responsible for ensuring universal access to reliable information about security papers and other exchange commodities on the market. The KPWiG also co-operates with government administrative organs, the NBP and institutions and participants in public trading on the stock market in the area of shaping the state's economic policy. The KPWiG also continuously monitors the functioning of all investment funds. From the start of its existence it has been head by Jacek Socha. On 19 September 2006 the institution was included in the newly established Polish Financial Supervision Authority (Polish: Komisja Nadzoru Finansowego)

== Activities ==
According to Art. 13 sec. 1 of the Act on Public Trading in Securities, the tasks of the Commission included:

- supervision over compliance with the rules of fair trading and competition in the field of public trading and ensuring universal access to reliable information on the securities market
- supervision of brokerage activities in the territory of the Republic of Poland
- inspiring, organizing and taking actions to ensure the efficient functioning of the securities market and protection of investors
- cooperation with other government administration bodies, the National Bank of Poland and institutions and participants of public trading in the field of shaping the economic policy of the state ensuring the development of the securities market
- disseminating knowledge about the principles of operation of the securities market
- preparation of draft legal acts related to the functioning of the securities market
- undertaking other activities provided for in the provisions of the Act

== See also ==
- Warsaw Stock Exchange
