= European Banking Authority =

Agency of the European Union

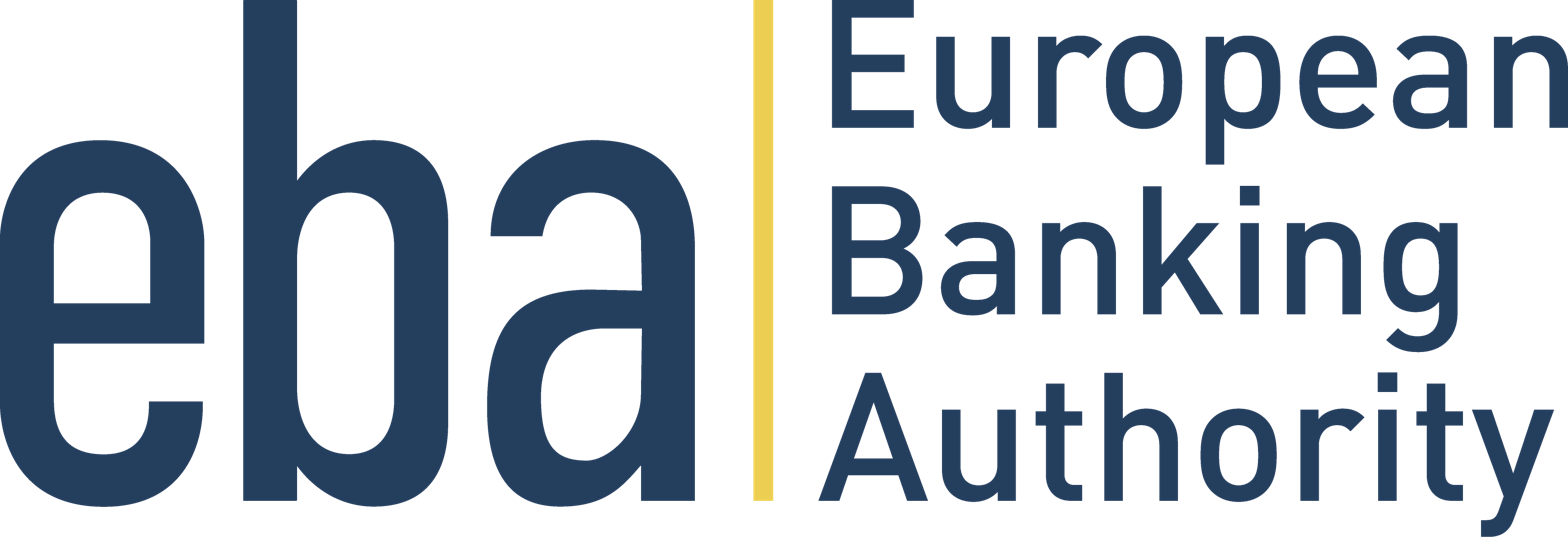

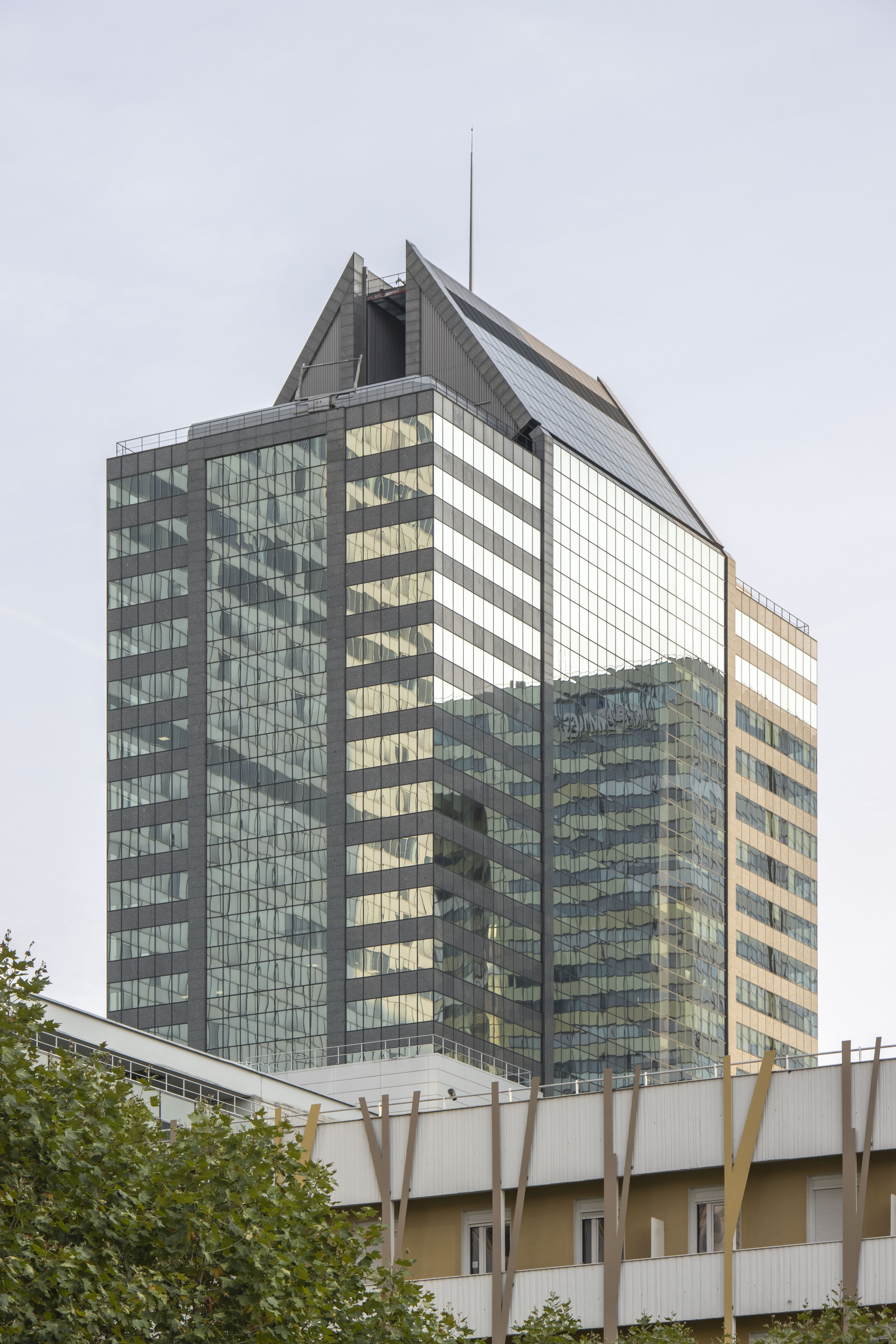
- Tour Europlaza in La Défense near Paris, seat of the EBA since June 2019

Agency overview
- Formed: 1 January 2011
- Preceding agency: Committee of European Banking Supervisors (CEBS)
- Jurisdiction: European Union
- Headquarters: La Défense Paris, France
- Motto: Our mission is to contribute to the stability and effectiveness of the European financial system through simple, consistent, transparent, and fair regulation and supervision that benefits all EU citizens.
- Employees: 270 (2026) Plus ca 1500 experts from the 27 EU competent authorities involved in EBA’s projects and groups.
- Annual budget: 64.4 million euros in (2026)
- Agency executives: Francois-Louis Michaud, Chair; Jonathan Overett Somnier, Acting Executive Director
- Key document: Regulation (EU) No 1093/2010
- Website: eba.europa.eu

Map
- European Banking Authority (European Union)

The European Banking Authority (EBA) is an independent EU agency responsible for developing regulatory standards and promoting supervisory convergence across the EU banking and financial sector. According to its founding regulation, the EBA is tasked with promoting supervisory convergence and protecting consumers throughout the EU. The Authority plays a central role in EU-wide bank stress testing and in the implementation of international banking standards such as Basel III. The Authority’s remit has expanded to include areas such as financial innovation, operational resilience and crypto‑assets.

== Mission and tasks ==
The EBA’s mission is to contribute to the stability and effectiveness of the European financial system through simple, consistent, transparent, and fair regulation and supervision that benefits all EU citizens.

Its main tasks include:

- Contributing to the EU Single Rulebook for banking by developing binding technical standards and guidelines that harmonise prudential requirements across the EU.
- Promoting supervisory convergence to ensure consistent application of EU rules by competent authorities.
- Assessing risks and vulnerabilities in the EU financial sector through regular and ad-hoc risk reports and EU-wide stress tests.
- Investigating alleged incorrect or insufficient application of EU law by national authorities, issuing decisions in emergencies, mediating disputes between competent authorities in cross-border cases, and advising the European Parliament, the European Council and the European Commission.
- Monitoring financial innovation and the transition to sustainable finance.

=== Direct supervision ===
Under the EU Markets in Crypto-Assets Regulation (MiCA, Regulation (EU) 2023/1114) the EBA has direct supervisory responsibilities of issuers of significant asset-referenced tokens (ARTs) and electronic money tokens (EMTs).

=== Direct oversight ===
The Digital Operational Resilience Act (DORA, Regulation (EU) 2022/2554) establishes an EU-wide framework for the oversight of critical ICT (information and communication technology) third-party service providers (CTPPs) that deliver essential digital services to the financial sector. The regulation establishes a framework for oversight of critical ICT providers to the financial sector. To perform these oversight tasks, a DORA Joint Oversight Department was established in 2024, bringing together the three European Supervisory Authorities (ESAs) – the EBA, the Occupational Pensions Authority (EIOPA), the European Securities and Markets Authority (ESMA). The Joint Oversight Department coordinates the assessment, monitoring and follow‑up of CTPPs operating across the EU financial sector.

=== Simplification and efficiency of the regulatory framework ===
As part of a broader European Union initiative to enhance the efficiency and proportionality of financial regulation, the European Banking Authority has undertaken work to simplify the EU regulatory and supervisory framework for banks.

In October 2025, the EBA published a report on the efficiency of the regulatory and supervisory framework, following a call for advice from the European Commission. The report sets out 21 recommendations aimed at improving the efficiency of the EU framework while maintaining financial stability.

These recommendations are organised across four areas: the development of Level 2 and Level 3 regulatory products, supervisory reporting requirements, the EBA’s contribution to the EU prudential framework, and the Authority’s internal working arrangements.

The recommendations form part of wider discussions among European policymakers and supervisory authorities on reducing regulatory complexity and administrative burden in the banking sector while preserving prudential safeguards.

== History and mandate ==
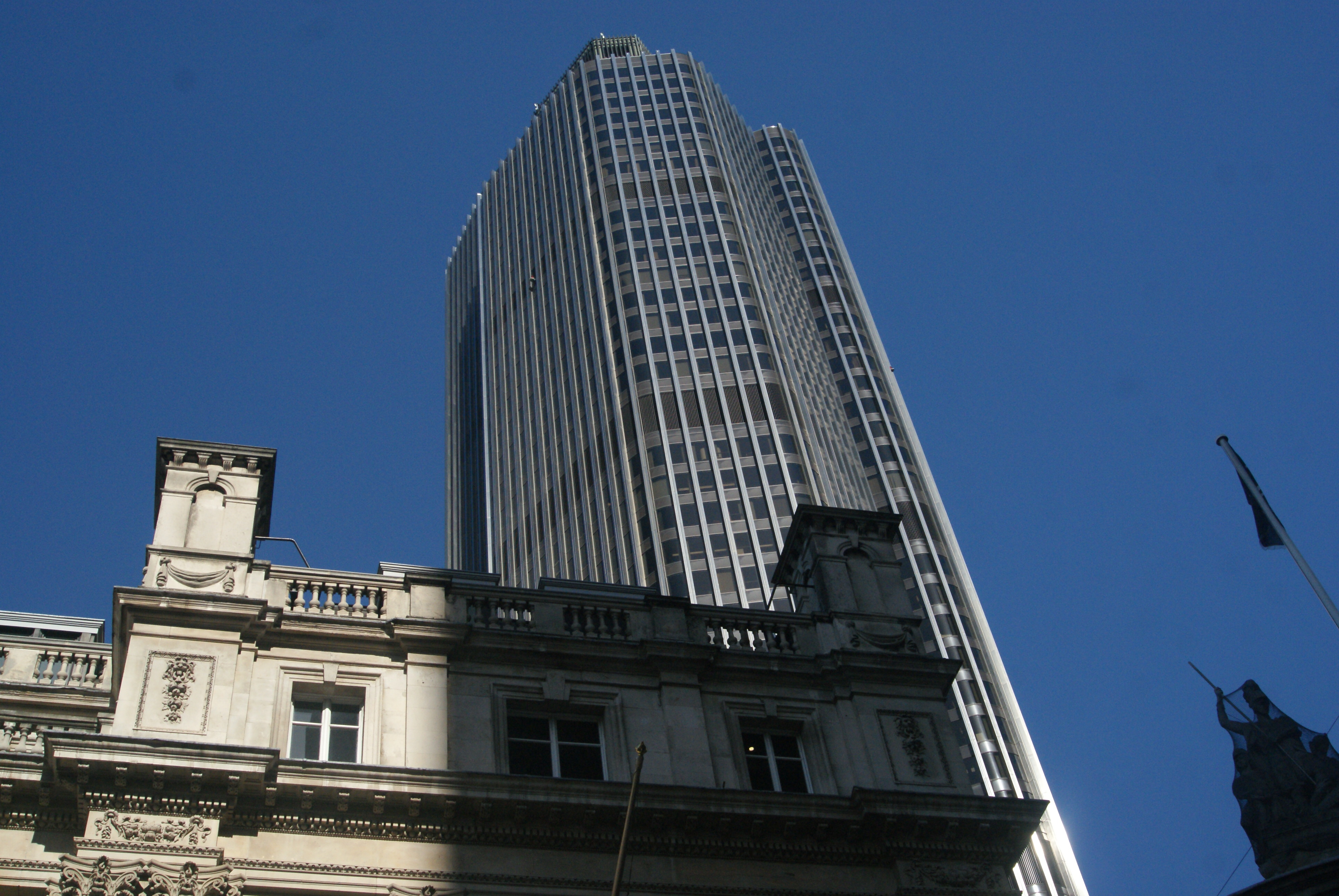
Tower 42 in the City of London, seat of the EBA from 2011 to December 2014

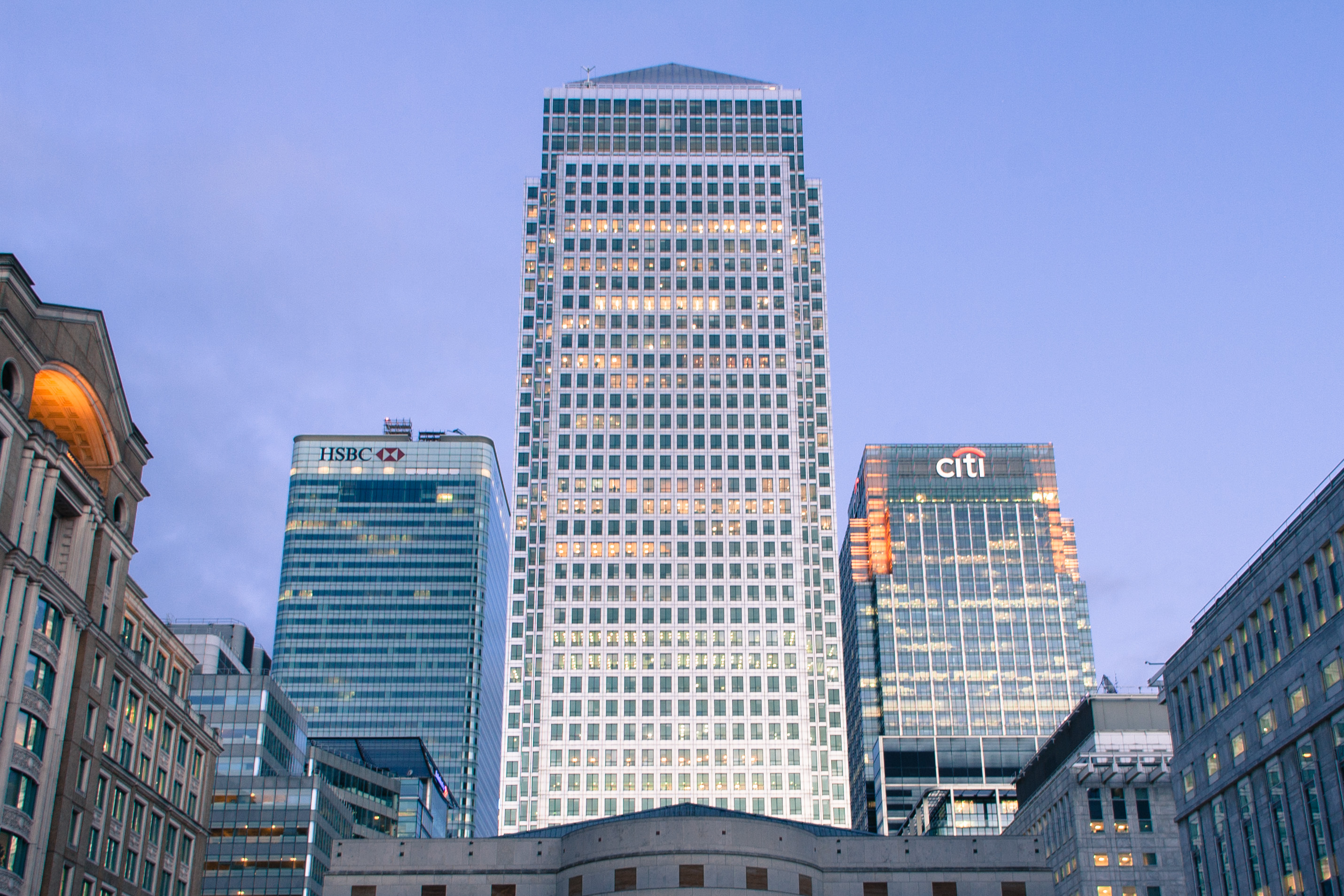
One Canada Square tower in Canary Wharf, London, seat of the EBA from December 2014 to May 2019

by Regulation (EU) No 1093/2010 as part of the European System of Financial Supervision (ESFS), succeeding the Committee of European Banking Supervisors (CEBS). Its mandate has since expanded with the development of new EU banking and financial‑services legislation, placing the EBA at the centre of the EU’s prudential regulatory and supervisory framework.

The Authority was initially based in London until its relocation to Paris in March 2019, following the United Kingdom’s decision to withdraw from the EU.

== Governance and structure ==
The EBA's governance structure includes:

The Board of Supervisors (BoS): the EBA’s main decision-making body, composed of the heads of national banking supervisory authorities from the 27 EU Member States and chaired by the EBA Chair. The BoS Members act independently and in the Union's interest.

The BoS takes all policy decisions, including the adoption of draft technical standards, guidelines, opinions and reports. It also takes the final decision on the EBA's budget.

The Management Board (MB): it takes decisions on operational matters of the EBA and is responsible for implementing its Work Programme. It ensures that the EBA carries out its mission and performs the tasks assigned to it in accordance with its Regulation. It’s composed of the EBA's Chair and six members who are elected from the BoS. The Executive Director and a representative of the European Commission participate in the meetings of the MB.

The EBA had an annual budget of approximately 64.4 million euros in 2026, and a staffing plan for 263 staff. The Agency’s funding is composed of 56% contributions from National Competent Authorities, 32% from the European Union, 10% from DORA, MiCAR and EMIR supervision fees, with the remaining share coming from other sources.

== Cooperation with EU institutions and international partners ==
The EBA is part of the European System of Financial Supervision (ESFS), established in 2010 following the 2008–09 financial crisis and based on the de Larosière report.

The ESFS is a multi‑layered system composed of micro‑ and macro‑prudential authorities, including the European Systemic Risk Board (ESRB), the European Insurance and Occupational Pensions Authority (EIOPA), the European Securities and Markets Authority (ESMA), and national competent authorities.

The EBA cooperates closely with EU institutions such as the European Commission, the European Parliament and the Council of the European Union, as well as with the European Central Bank (ECB) and the Single Resolution Board, to support effective supervision and financial stability across the Union.

Internationally, the EBA engages with key financial organisations to promote the development and consistent application of robust regulatory and supervisory standards. It participates actively in global standard setting bodies, including the Basel Committee on Banking Supervision (BCBS) and the Financial Stability Board (FSB), and collaborates with institutions such as the International Monetary Fund (IMF) and the Organisation for Economic Cooperation and Development (OECD).

== Board of Supervisors ==
Voting members consist of the head of the national public authority competent for the supervision of credit institutions of EU Member States.

The EBA Chair has been granted voting status by the 2019 revision of the EBA regulation.

Non-voting members include representatives from the supervisory authorities for non-EU members of the European Economic Area, namely Iceland (Fjármálaeftirlitið (Icelandic Financial Supervisory Authority - FME)), Liechtenstein (Finanzmarktaufsicht - FMA (Financial Market Authority)), and Norway (Finanstilsynet (Norwegian Financial Supervisory Authority).

The European Commission, ECB Supervisory Board, European Systemic Risk Board, European Securities and Markets Authority, European Insurance and Occupational Pensions Authority are part of the Board of Supervisors as observers.

== Leadership ==
=== Chairperson ===
- François-Louis Michaud (Since 16 April 2026)
- José Manuel Campa (1 May 2019 - 31 January 2026)
- Andrea Enria (1 January 2011 - 31 December 2018)

=== Vice-Chairperson ===
- Helmut Ettl (since July 2023)
- Jo Swyngedouw (June 2018 - June 2023)
- Pedro Duarte Neves (July 2013 - June 2018)

=== Executive Director ===
- Thomas Gstädtner
- Jonathan Overett Somnier (acting, 2026)
- François-Louis Michaud (1 September 2020 - 15 April 2026)
- Peter Mihalik (acting, 2020)
- Ádám Farkas (2011-2020)

== See also ==
- European Banking Supervision
- European Insurance and Occupational Pensions Authority
- European Medicines Agency
- European Securities and Markets Authority
- European System of Financial Supervision
- European Systemic Risk Board
- List of acronyms: European sovereign-debt crisis
- List of financial supervisory authorities by country
