= Belgian Banking Commission =

Belgian financial supervisory authority

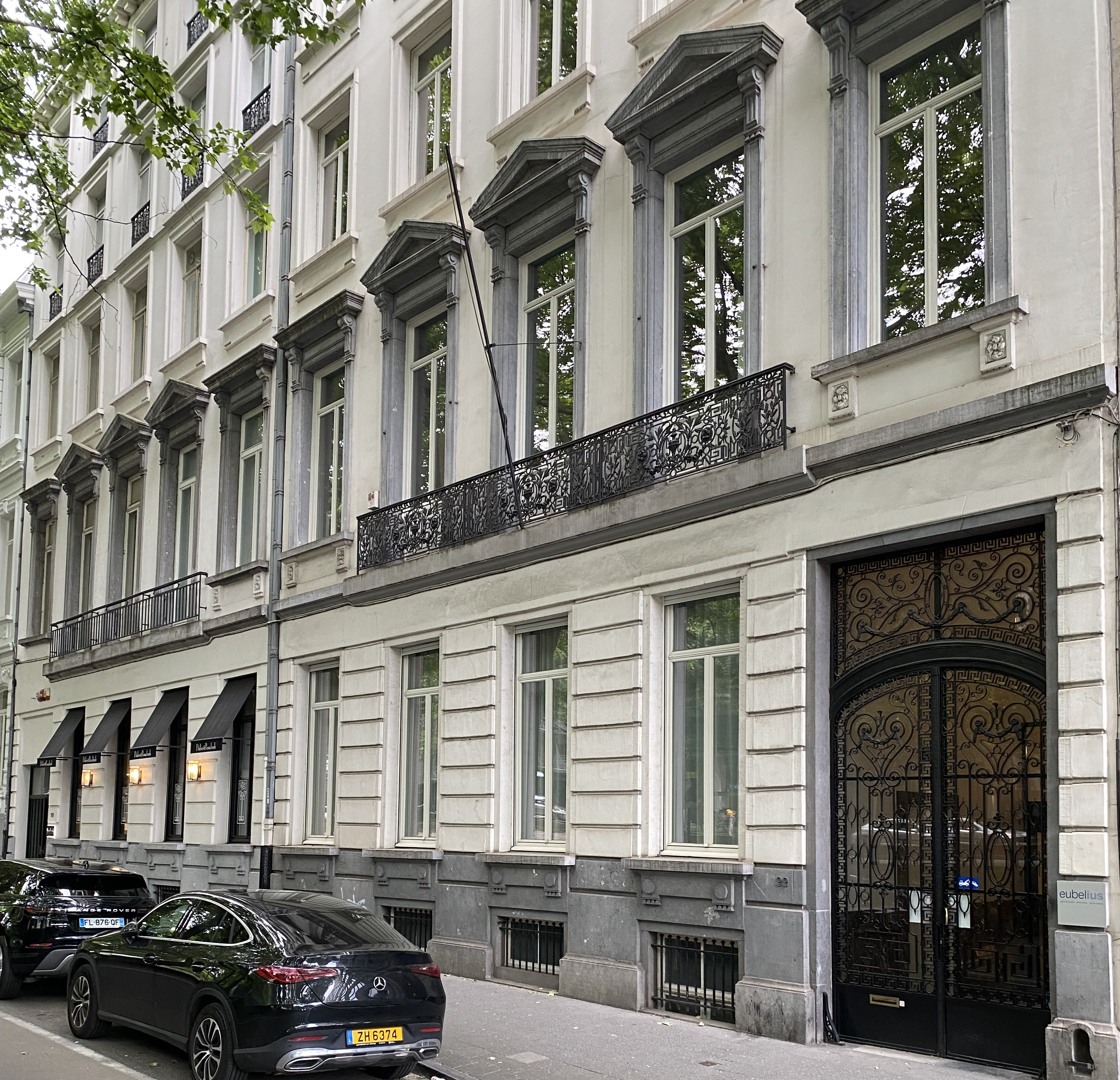
Building at Avenue Louise 99 in Brussels, seat of the Banking Commission until June 2004

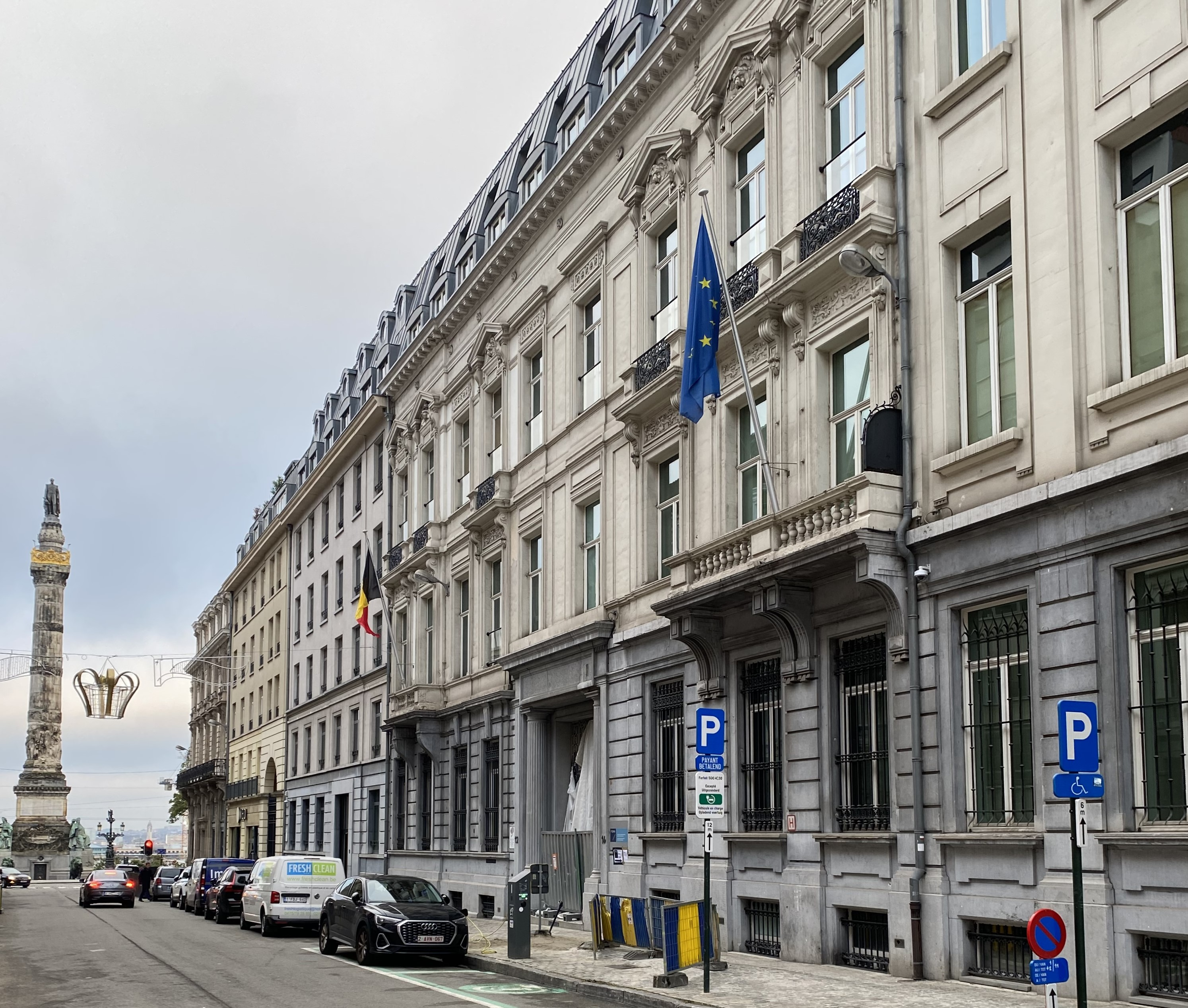
Building at rue du Congrès 12–14 in Brussels, seat of the Banking Commission from June 2004, previously head office of Kredietbank-Congo (1952–1966)

The Belgian Banking Commission (French: Commission bancaire) was a Belgian financial supervisory authority created in 1935 in the aftermath of the financial turmoil of the early 1930s. It was later renamed CBF in 1990 (French: Commission bancaire et financière, Dutch: Commissie voor het Bank- en Financiewezen), then CBFA in 2004 (French: Commission Bancaire, Financière et des Assurances, Dutch: Commissie voor het Bank-, Financie- en Assurantiewezen).

The commission's existence ended in 2011, with its duties were shared between the National Bank of Belgium and the newly established Financial Services and Markets Authority.

== Naming ==
As with most Belgian financial institutions, the commission was generally referred to by its French name in its first decades of existence, including in English-speaking contexts. As Belgian linguistic practices and sensitivities evolved in the postwar period, more emphasis was gradually placed on parity of status between French and Dutch. The acronyms CBF and CBFA were specifically construed so as to be identical in the two languages.

== Commission bancaire ==
The Banking Commission was established in 1935, at the time one of the first independent banking supervisory agencies in the world - in other countries, to the extent that banking supervision existed at all, it was exercised either by a specialized office in the ministry of finance, or by an arm of the central bank. Under the German occupation of Belgium during World War II, a separate German-run Office of Banking Control operated in parallel with the Banking Commission, which was deprived of any authority over German banks operating in Belgium.

The mandate of the commission was gradually broadened to control of mutual funds, then corporate securities offerings in 1964, holding companies in 1967, and private savings banks in 1975.

== CBF ==
In 1990, the Banking Commission was renamed CBF (French: Commission bancaire et financière, Dutch: Commissie voor het Bank- en Financiewezen) as its duties were extended to more non-bank market segments.

== CBFA ==
Logo of the CBFA

The CBFA was formed in 2004 by the merger of the CBF with Belgium's insurance supervisory authority OCA-CDV (French: Office de Contrôle des Assurances, Dutch: Controledienst voor de Verzekeringen), which had been created in 1975.

== 2011 reform ==
The crisis experience with Fortis Group and Dexia in 2008 led to the demise of the CBFA and a reform of financial supervisory architecture, enshrined in legislation of 2 July 2010. As a result, Belgium adopted the so-called Twin Peaks model in which prudential supervision of banks and insurers is separated from the conduct-of-business supervision of a range of financial professionals, firms and markets. On 1 April 2011, the CBFA's former prudential mandate went to the National Bank of Belgium, while its conduct-of-business supervisory duties went to the Financial Services and Markets Authority (FSMA).

== Leadership ==
- Georges Janssen, chairman 1935 - 1938
- Maurice Frère, chairman 1938 - 1942
- Eugène de Barsy, chairman 1944 - 1973
- André Oleffe, chairman 1973 - 1974
- Jean Godeaux, chairman 1974 - 1982
- Walter Van Gerven, chairman 1982 - 1988
- Jean-Louis Duplat, chairman 1989 - 2001
- Eddy Wymeersch, chairman 2001 - 2007
- Jean-Paul Servais, chairman 2007 - 2011

== See also ==
- Economy of Belgium
- National Bank of Belgium
- Securities Commission
