= European Systemic Risk Board =

European Union financial agency

Agency overview
- Formed: December 16, 2010
- Jurisdiction: European Union
- Headquarters: Seat of the European Central Bank, Sonnemannstrasse 20, 60311 Frankfurt am Main, Germany
- Agency executive: Christine Lagarde, Chair of the ESRB
- Parent agency: European Central Bank
- Key documents: Regulation (EU) No 1092/2010; Council Regulation (EU) No 1096/2010
- Website: www.esrb.europa.eu

The European Systemic Risk Board (ESRB) is a group established on 16 December 2010 in response to the euro area crisis. It is tasked with the macro-prudential oversight of the financial system within the European Union in order to contribute to the prevention or mitigation of systemic risks to financial stability in the EU. It shall contribute to the smooth functioning of the internal market and thereby ensure a sustainable contribution of the financial sector to economic growth.

The ESRB is a macro-prudential oversight body of the EU and it is part of the European System of Financial Supervision (ESFS), the purpose of which is to ensure the supervision of the EU's financial system. As a body lacking juridical personality, the ESRB relies on hosting and support by the European Central Bank. It includes representatives from the ECB, national central banks and supervisory authorities of EU member states, and the European Commission.

== Overview ==
The operation of the board has been entrusted to the European Central Bank and the first Chair of the ESRB was Jean-Claude Trichet. Currently the ESRB is chaired by Christine Lagarde, the ECB president. In order to take advantage of existing and compatible structures, and to minimise any delay to the commencement of its operations, the ECB provides analytical, statistical, administrative and logistical support to the ESRB, and technical advice is also drawn from national central banks, supervisors and an independent scientific committee.

== Ieke van den Burg Prize for research on systemic risk ==
The ESRB's Advisory Scientific Committee awards the annual Ieke van den Burg Prize for outstanding research conducted by young academics on a topic related to the ESRB's mission. The prize is named in honor of Ieke van den Burg, for her work on financial stability. The winning paper is usually presented at the ESRB Annual Conference and published in the ESRB Working Paper Series.

List of recipients
Year	Recipient(s)	Title of research paper	Ph.D. alma mater
2015	Claire Célérier and Boris Vallée	The Motives For Financial Complexity: An Empirical Investigation	Toulouse School of Economics and HEC Paris
2016	Matthias Efing	Arbitraging the Basel Securitization Framework: Evidence from German ABS Investment	University of Geneva
2016	Sergey Chernenko and Adi Sunderam	Liquidity Transformation in Asset Management: Evidence from the Cash Holdings of Mutual Funds	Harvard University and Harvard University
2017	Marco D’Errico and Tarik Roukny	Compressing over-the-counter markets	University of Milan and Université Libre de Bruxelles
2018	Kilian Huber	Disentangling the Effects of a Banking Crisis: Evidence from German Firms and Counties	London School of Economics
2019	André F. Silva	Strategic Liquidity Mismatch and Financial Sector Stability	Cass Business School
2019	Guillaume Vuillemey	The Value of Central Clearing	Sciences Po Paris
2020	Marcus Mølbak Ingholt	Multiple Credit Constraints and Time-Varying Macroeconomic Dynamics	University of Copenhagen
2021	Karsten Müller and Emil Verner	Credit allocation and macroeconomic fluctuations	Warwick Business School and Princeton University

== See also ==
- European Banking Authority
- European Insurance and Occupational Pensions Authority
- European Securities and Markets Authority
- List of acronyms: European sovereign-debt crisis
- List of financial supervisory authorities by country
