= Foreign exchange regulation =

Financial regulation of the Forex market

Foreign exchange regulation is a form of financial regulation specifically aimed at the over-the-counter Forex market that is decentralized and operates with no central exchange or clearing house. Due to its decentralized and global nature, the foreign exchange market has been more prone to foreign exchange fraud and has been less regulated than other financial markets.

However, some countries do regulate forex brokers through governmental and independent supervisory bodies. For example, the National Futures Association and the Commodity Futures Trading Commission in the US, the Australian Securities & Investments Commission in Australia, and the Financial Conduct Authority in the UK. These bodies act as watchdogs for their respective markets and provide financial licenses to organizations that comply with local regulations.

== Objective ==
The objective of regulation is to ensure fair and ethical business behavior. In their turn, all foreign exchange brokers, investment banks and signal sellers have to operate in compliance with the rules and standards laid down by the regulators. Typically, they must be registered and licensed in the country where their operations are based. Licensed brokers may be subject to recurrent audits, reviews and evaluations to check that they meet the industry standards. Foreign exchange brokers may have capital requirements which require them to hold a sufficient amount of funds to be able to execute and complete foreign exchange contracts concluded by their clients and also to return clients' funds intact in case of bankruptcy.

Each Forex regulator operates within its own jurisdiction and regulation and enforcement varies significantly from country to country. In the European Union, a license from one member state covers the whole continent under the MiFID 2 regulation and has resulted in regulatory arbitrage where companies select the EU country that imposes the least controls such as CySEC in Cyprus. Not all foreign exchange brokers are regulated and many will register in jurisdictions that impose low-regulatory environments such as tax havens and corporate havens that form part of offshore banking.

== Main regulatory requirements ==
Although regulatory requirements differ between jurisdictions, there are certain common points they focus on:

- Client conduct - These ensure brokers cannot make unrealistic or misleading claims or promises. It also prevents brokers from advising clients to take risky trade decisions or to enter into positions that are not in their best interest.
- Segregation of funds - These restrictions ensure that the broker can not use any of the clients funds for its operational or other expenses. This regulation requires that all deposits be maintained separately from the broker’s bank accounts.
- Reporting and disclosure - These rules ensure the broker's clients are well informed of the status of their account and the risks associated with Forex products.
- Leverage limits - These limits ensure clients maintain an acceptable risk level. As such, firms may not offer increasingly higher leverage to consumers (e.g. 1:1000).
- Minimum capital requirements - These restrictions ensure that clients can withdraw their funds at any time including in the event of bankruptcy of the broker.
- Audit - Periodic auditing assures the broker financial risk is tolerable and there is no misappropriation of funds. To this end, brokers must submit periodic financial and capital adequacy statements.

== Regulatory Bodies by Country ==
=== Europe ===
- Belgium - Financial Services and Markets Authority, FSMA
- Bulgaria - Financial Supervision Commission, FSC Bulgaria
- Croatia - Croatian Financial Services Supervisory Agency, CFSSA
- Cyprus - Cyprus Securities and Exchange Commission, CySEC
- Czech Republic - Czech National Bank, CNB
- Denmark - Danish Financial Supervisory Authority, Danish FSA
- Estonia - Estonian Financial Supervisory Authority, Estonian FSA
- Finland - Finnish Financial Supervisory Authority, Finnish FSA
- France - Autorité des Marchés Financiers, AMF
- Germany - Federal Financial Supervisory Authority, BaFin
- Greece - Hellenic Capital Market Commission, HCMC
- Hungary - Hungarian Financial Supervisory Authority, HFSA
- Iceland - Financial Supervisory Authority, Iceland FSA
- Ireland - Central Bank of Ireland
- Isle of Man - Financial Supervision Commission, FSC
- Italy - Commissione Nazionale per le Società e la Borsa, CONSOB
- Latvia - Financial and Capital Market Commission, FKTK
- Lithuania - Bank of Lithuania
- Liechtenstein - Financial Market Authority, FMA
- Luxembourg - Commission de Surveillance du Secteur Financier, CSSF
- Malta - Malta Financial Services Authority, MFSA
- Norway - Financial Supervisory Authority of Norway, FSA of Norway
- Poland - Polish Financial Supervision Authority, PFSA
- Portugal - Portuguese Securities Market Commission, CMVM
- Romania - Romanian Financial Supervisory Authority, ASF
- Russia - Central Bank of Russia, CBR
- Slovakia - National Bank of Slovakia, NBS
- Spain - National Securities Market Commission, CNMV
- Sweden - Financial Supervisory Authority, Swedish FSA
- Switzerland - Swiss Financial Market Supervisory Authority, FINMA
- United Kingdom - Financial Conduct Authority FCA

=== Asia ===
- Azerbaijan - State Committee for Securities
- Bangladesh - Securities and Exchange Commission, SEC
- China - China Securities Regulatory Commission, CSRC
- UAE - Capital Market Authority, CMA
- Hong Kong - Securities and Futures Commission, SFC
- India - Reserve Bank of India, RBI
- Indonesia:
  - Financial Services Authority, FSA of Indonesia
  - Bank Indonesia, BI
- Israel - Israel Securities Authority, ISA
- Japan - Financial Services Agency, FSA of Japan
- Kuwait:
  - Ministry of Commerce and Industry
  - Kuwait Chamber of Commerce and Industry, KCCI
- Lebanon - Bank of Lebanon
- Malaysia - Securities Commission Malaysia
- Mongolia - Financial Regulatory Commission of Mongolia
- Pakistan - Securities and Exchange Commission of Pakistan, SECP
- Philippines:
  - Securities and Exchange Commission
  - Bangko Sentral ng Pilipinas, BSP
- Singapore - Monetary Authority of Singapore, MAS
- South Korea - Financial Services Commission FSC of Korea
- Sri Lanka - Securities and Exchange Commission of Sri Lanka
- Thailand - Securities and Exchange Commission of Thailand
- Turkey - Capital Markets Board, CMB

=== North and Central America ===
==== North America ====
- Bahamas - Securities Commission of the Bahamas, SCB
- Canada - Canadian Investment Regulatory Organization, CIRO
- Mexico - Comisión Nacional Bancaria y de Valores, CNBV
- United States:
  - Commodity Futures Trading Commission, CFTC
  - National Futures Association, NFA

==== Central America ====
- Anguilla - Anguilla Financial Services Commission, Anguillan FSC
- Antigua and Barbuda - Eastern Caribbean Securities Regulatory Commission, ECSRC
- Belize - Financial Services Commission, Belize FSC
- British Virgin Islands - Financial Services Commission, BVI FSC
- Cayman Islands - Cayman Islands Monetary Authority, CIMA
- Dominica - Financial Services Unit, FSU
- Panama:
  - Superintendency of the Securities Market, SMV
  - Ministry of Industry and Commerce of Panama, MICI
- St. Vincent and the Grenadines - Financial Services Authority, SVG FSA

=== Africa ===
- Morocco - Moroccan Capital Market Authority, AMMC
- Kenya - Capital Markets Authority, CMA of Kenya
- Mauritius - Financial Services Commission, FSC of Mauritius
- Nigeria - Securities and Exchange Commission, SEC of Nigeria
- Seychelles - Seychelles Financial Services Authority, Seychelles FSA
- South Africa - Financial Sector Conduct Authority, FSCA

=== Australia and Oceania ===
- Australia - Australian Securities and Investments Commission, ASIC
- New Zealand - Financial Markets Authority, FMA
- Vanuatu - Vanuatu Financial Services Commission, VFSC

== See also ==
- International Organization of Securities Commissions
- List of financial supervisory authorities by country
