= Financial supervisory authority =

Public authority in finance

A financial regulatory authority or financial supervisory authority, alternatively financial regulator or financial supervisor, is a public authority whose role is to ensure the proper implementation of financial regulation within its scope of responsibility. Some, though not all, such authorities also set financial rules of their own.

Financial supervisory authorities include those in charge of bank supervision; of securities regulation, often referred to as securities commissions; of anti–money laundering supervision of financial firms; of consumer protection in financial services, and more generally of enforcing "conduct-of-business" requirements; of macroprudential regulation; and of audit oversight, under a separate authority in many jurisdictions. Several deposit guarantee schemes also have a supervisory role associated with their involvement in bank resolution.

== Semantics ==
As often in finance, the vocabulary of financial regulation and supervision is often fuzzy and affected by various jurisdiction-specific legacies. Strictly speaking, "regulation" refers to the setting of rules, while "supervision" refers to a function that combines the oversight of entities or markets meant to comply with such rules and the enforcement of the rules in case of compliance breaches. In practice, the "rulebook" that financial authorities implement typically includes legislation as well as rules set by specialized agencies. Some financial authorities have no rulemaking (or regulatory) role of their own.

In the United States, longstanding practice refers to financial authorities as regulators. China has emulated this practice in the English-language names, from the China Securities Regulatory Commission in 1992 to the National Financial Regulatory Administration in 2023. In the European Union, several prudential and integrated authorities are named with reference to supervision, e.g. the Finnish Financial Supervisory Authority, the French Prudential Supervision and Resolution Authority, or the Polish Financial Supervision Authority as well as the Single Supervisory Mechanism at the euro-area level. Among international bodies, the Basel Committee on Banking Supervision refers to supervision even though much of its activity focuses on capital, liquidity and disclosure standard-setting. The International Organization of Securities Commissions refers to a decreasingly widespread model of separate securities commissions. The International Forum of Independent Audit Regulators refers to regulators, even though many of its member authorities refer to audit "oversight", a word often understood as implying a less hands-on practice than supervision.

== Scope of authority ==
=== Functional scope ===
Some or all of these distinct mandates are often brought together in a single authority. Different jurisdictions have addressed the challenge of organizing financial regulation in multiple ways that have often evolved over time and display significant path dependence. In general, three types of financial supervisory architecture have been identified by scholars:

- a "sectoral" supervisory architecture (sometimes referred to as "institutional" or "functional"), in which different authorities are in charge of different sub-sectors of the financial system such as banking, insurance, and securities markets;
- an "integrated" architecture in which a single authority is in charge of all segments of the financial system under all applicable policy frameworks;
- a "twin peaks" architecture in which separate authorities are in charge, respectively, of prudential supervision and of conduct-of-business oversight.

As of 2023, examples of sectoral architecture include Brazil, Hong Kong, and India; examples of integrated architecture include Japan, Russia, Singapore, Switzerland, and South Korea; and examples of twin-peaks architecture include Australia, South Africa, and the United Kingdom. China, the European Union, and the United States have more complex supervisory systems that defy simple classification.

=== Geographical scope ===
Whereas most financial regulatory authorities have a national mandate, there are instances of both subnational and supranational authorities:

- Subnational authorities are extant most prominently in Canada and the United States, at the level of individual provinces and states respectively, and in autonomous territories such as British Overseas Territories and Crown Dependencies, Constituent countries of the Kingdom of the Netherlands, Hong Kong and Macau, or the Republika Srpska (but not, for example, in individual countries of the United Kingdom or Overseas France)
  - Dedicated authorities have also been established for financial enclaves under a special regulatory regime, including the Abu Dhabi Global Market, the Dubai International Financial Centre, the GIFT International Financial Services Centre in India, the Astana International Financial Centre in Kazakhstan, the Labuan International Business and Financial Centre in Malaysia, and the Qatar Financial Centre
- Supranational financial authorities exist in Africa, the Eastern Caribbean, and the European Union. The main such authorities are:
  - the Eastern Caribbean Central Bank as banking supervisor in the Eastern Caribbean Currency Union (since 1983)
  - the Banking Commission of the West African Monetary Union as banking supervisor in the West African Monetary Union (since 1990)
  - the Central African Banking Commission as banking supervisor in the Economic and Monetary Community of Central Africa (since 1993)
  - the Regional Insurance Control Commission as insurance supervisor in the two African monetary unions and the Comoros (since 1995)
  - the Financial Markets Authority of the West African Monetary Union as securities commission in the WAMU (since 1996)
  - the European Central Bank within European Banking Supervision as supervisor of most of the euro area banking sector (since 2014)
  - the Central African Financial Market Supervisory Commission as securities commission in the EMCCA (since 2019)

In addition, both the European Securities and Markets Authority (since 2011) and the European Banking Authority (since 2023) have been granted direct supervisory mandates over limited market segments within the European Economic Area.

== International organizations ==
Several international or global bodies have financial regulatory authorities as their main membership. Given the variety of supervisory mandates and choices of supervisory architecture, the lists of members of these bodies occasionally overlap. These bodies include:

- Basel Committee on Banking Supervision (BCBS, est. 1974)
- International Organization of Securities Commissions (IOSCO, est. 1983)
- International Association of Insurance Supervisors (IAIS, est. 1994)
- International Association of Deposit Insurers (IADI, est. 2002)
- International Forum of Independent Audit Regulators (IFIAR, est. 2006)

Financial regulatory authorities from several jurisdictions are also represented in the Financial Stability Board, alongside finance ministries and central banks.

== See also ==
- Financial regulation
- Bank supervision
- Insurance law
- Anti–money laundering
- Securities commission
