= Capital Market Authority =

Capital Market Authority or CMA is a common name for a securities commission and may refer to:

- Capital Market Authority (United Arab Emirates)
- Capital Market Authority (Saudi Arabia)
- Capital Market Authority (Oman)
