= List of financial supervisory authorities by country =

In this list of financial supervisory authorities, central banks are only listed where they act as direct supervisors of individual financial firms, and competition authorities and takeover panels are not listed unless they are set up exclusively for financial services. Financial intelligence units and policy banks are not listed, unless they also have a financial supervisory mandate.

== Financial supervisory authorities by country ==
In the European Union, the European Securities and Markets Authority (ESMA) holds significant direct supervisory mandates that support its inclusion in the list; by contrast, the direct supervisory roles European Banking Authority (EBA) and European Insurance and Occupational Pensions Authority (EIOPA) are not significant enough to justify mention.

Country	Financial supervisory authorities
Afghanistan	Da Afghanistan Bank
Albania	Financial Supervisory Authority (AMF)
Algeria	Commission d'Organisation et de Surveillance des Opérations de Bourse (COSOB)
Andorra	Andorran Financial Authority (AFA)
Angola	Capital Markets Commission (CMC); Agência Angolana de Regulação e Supervisão de Seguros (ARSEG)
Antigua & Barbuda	Eastern Caribbean Central Bank; Financial Services Regulatory Commission (FSRC)
Argentina	Central Bank of Argentina; Comisión Nacional de Valores (CNV); Superintendency of Insurance (SSN)
Armenia	Central Bank of Armenia
Australia	Australian Prudential Regulation Authority (APRA); Australian Securities and Investments Commission (ASIC); Australian Financial Complaints Authority (AFCA)
Austria	European Central Bank (ECB) through European Banking Supervision; European Securities and Markets Authority (ESMA); Single Resolution Board (SRB); Financial Market Authority (FMA); Audit Oversight Body of Austria (APAB)
Azerbaijan	Central Bank of Azerbaijan; Financial Market Supervisory Authority of Azerbaijan (FIMSA)
Bahamas	Central Bank of The Bahamas; Securities Commission of the Bahamas (SCB); Insurance Commission of The Bahamas
Bahrain	Central Bank of Bahrain
Bangladesh	Bangladesh Bank; Financial Reporting Council; Securities and Exchange Commission (SEC); Insurance Development and Regulatory Authority (IDRA)
Barbados	Barbados Revenue Authority (BRA); Central Bank of Barbados; Financial Services Commission (FSC)
Belarus	National Bank of the Republic of Belarus
Belgium	European Central Bank (ECB) through European Banking Supervision; European Securities and Markets Authority (ESMA); Single Resolution Board (SRB); National Bank of Belgium; Financial Services and Markets Authority (FSMA); Collège de Supervision des Réviseurs d'Entreprises (CTR/CSR); Cellule de Traitement des Informations Financières = Cel voor Financiële Informatieverwerking (CTIF-CFI)
Belize	Financial Services Commission (FSC); Office of Supervisor of Insurance & Private Pensions (OSIPP)
Benin	Banking Commission of the West African Monetary Union (CB-UMOA); Financial Markets Authority of the West African Monetary Union (AMF-UMOA); Regional Insurance Control Commission (CRCA)
Bhutan	Royal Monetary Authority of Bhutan
Bolivia	Autoridad de Supervisión del Sistema Financiero (ASFI)
Bosnia and Herzegovina	Central Bank of Bosnia and Herzegovina; Securities Commission of the Federation of Bosnia and Herzegovina (KOMVP)
Botswana	Bank of Botswana; Non-Bank Financial Institutions Regulatory Authority (NBFIRA)
Brazil	Central Bank of Brazil; Securities Commission (CVM); Superintendency of Private Insurance (SUSEP); Agência Nacional de Saúde Suplementar (ANS)
Brunei	Brunei Darussalam Central Bank
Bulgaria	European Central Bank (ECB) through European Banking Supervision; European Securities and Markets Authority (ESMA); Single Resolution Board (SRB); Bulgarian National Bank; Financial Supervision Commission (FSC); Bulgarian Deposit Insurance Fund (BDIF); Bulgarian Commission for Public Oversight of Statutory Auditors (CPOSA)
Burkina Faso	Banking Commission of the West African Monetary Union (CB-UMOA); Financial Markets Authority of the West African Monetary Union (AMF-UMOA); Regional Insurance Control Commission (CRCA)
Burundi	Banque de la République du Burundi (BRB); Autorité de Régulation des Marchés des Capitaux (ARMC); Agence de Régulation et de Contrôle des Assurances (ARCA)
Cape Verde	Bank of Cape Verde
Cambodia	National Bank of Cambodia; Securities and Exchange Regulator of Cambodia (SERC)
Cameroon	Central African Banking Commission (COBAC); Central African Financial Market Supervisory Commission (COSUMAF); Regional Insurance Control Commission (CRCA)
Canada	Office of the Superintendent of Financial Institutions (OSFI); Canada Deposit Insurance Corporation (CDIC); Financial Consumer Agency of Canada (FCAC); Canadian Investment Regulatory Organization (CIRO); Canadian Public Accountability Board (CPAB)
Central African Republic	Central African Banking Commission (COBAC); Central African Financial Market Supervisory Commission (COSUMAF); Regional Insurance Control Commission (CRCA)
Chad	Central African Banking Commission (COBAC); Central African Financial Market Supervisory Commission (COSUMAF); Regional Insurance Control Commission (CRCA)
Chile	Central Bank of Chile; Comisión para el Mercado Financiero (CMF); Superintendencia de Pensiones de Chile (SP)
China	Central Financial Commission (CFC); Central Financial Work Commission (CFWC); National Administration of Financial Regulation (NAFR); China Securities Regulatory Commission (CSRC)
Colombia	Superintendencia Financiera de Colombia
Comoros	Central Bank of the Comoros; Regional Insurance Control Commission (CRCA)
Democratic Republic of the Congo	Central Bank of the Congo; Autorité de Régulation et de Contrôle des Assurances (ARCA)
Republic of Congo	Central African Banking Commission (COBAC); Central African Financial Market Supervisory Commission (COSUMAF); Regional Insurance Control Commission (CRCA)
Costa Rica	Superintendencia General de Valores (Sugeval); Superintendencia General de Seguros
Côte d'Ivoire	Banking Commission of the West African Monetary Union (CB-UMOA); Financial Markets Authority of the West African Monetary Union (AMF-UMOA); Regional Insurance Control Commission (CRCA)
Croatia	European Central Bank (ECB) through European Banking Supervision; European Securities and Markets Authority (ESMA); Single Resolution Board (SRB); Croatian National Bank; Croatian Financial Services Supervisory Agency (Hanfa)
Cyprus	European Central Bank (ECB) through European Banking Supervision; European Securities and Markets Authority (ESMA); Single Resolution Board (SRB); Central Bank of Cyprus; Cyprus Securities and Exchange Commission (CySEC); Insurance Companies Control Service (ICCS); Registrar of Occupational Retirement Benefit Funds; Cyprus Public Audit Oversight Board (CyPAOB)
Czechia	Czech National Bank; European Securities and Markets Authority (ESMA); Czech Public Audit Oversight Board (RVDA)
Denmark	European Securities and Markets Authority (ESMA); Financial Supervisory Authority (Finanstilsynet); Finansiel Stabilitet; Danish Business Authority
Dominica	Eastern Caribbean Central Bank; Financial Service Unit of the Commonwealth of Dominica (FSU)
Dominican Republic	Superintendencia de Bancos de la República Dominicana (SB); Superintendencia de Seguros de la República Dominicana; Superintendencia del Mercado de Valores (SIMV)
Ecuador	Superintendencia de Bancos del Ecuador; Superintendencia de Compañías, Valores y Seguros
Egypt	Central Bank of Egypt; Egyptian Financial Supervisory Authority
El Salvador	Superintendencia del Sistema Financiero (SSF); Instituto De Garantía De Depósitos (IGD)
Equatorial Guinea	Central African Banking Commission (COBAC); Central African Financial Market Supervisory Commission (COSUMAF); Regional Insurance Control Commission (CRCA)
Estonia	European Central Bank (ECB) through European Banking Supervision; European Securities and Markets Authority (ESMA); Single Resolution Board (SRB); Financial Supervisory Authority (Finantsinspektsioon); Estonian Guarantee Fund
Eswatini	Central Bank of Eswatini; Financial Services Regulatory Authority (FSRA)
Ethiopia	National Bank of Ethiopia
Fiji	Reserve Bank of Fiji
Finland	European Central Bank (ECB) through European Banking Supervision; European Securities and Markets Authority (ESMA); Single Resolution Board (SRB); Financial Supervision Authority (Finanssivalvonta or FIN-FSA); Finnish Financial Stability Authority (RVV)
France	European Central Bank (ECB) through European Banking Supervision; European Securities and Markets Authority (ESMA); Single Resolution Board (SRB); Prudential Supervision and Resolution Authority (ACPR); Financial Markets Authority (AMF); Haute autorité de l'audit (H2A)
Gabon	Central African Banking Commission (COBAC); Central African Financial Market Supervisory Commission (COSUMAF); Regional Insurance Control Commission (CRCA)
Georgia	National Bank of Georgia; Insurance State Supervision Service of Georgia
Germany	European Central Bank (ECB) through European Banking Supervision; European Securities and Markets Authority (ESMA); Single Resolution Board (SRB); Federal Financial Supervisory Authority (BaFin); Abschlussprüferaufsichtsstelle (APAS)
Ghana	Bank of Ghana; Securities and Exchange Commission (SEC); National Insurance Commission (NIC)
Greece	European Central Bank (ECB) through European Banking Supervision; European Securities and Markets Authority (ESMA); Single Resolution Board (SRB); Bank of Greece; Hellenic Capital Market Commission (HCMC); Hellenic Accounting and Auditing Standards Oversight Board (ELTE)
Grenada	Eastern Caribbean Central Bank; Grenada International Financial Services Authority (GIFSA)
Guatemala	Superintendencia de Bancos de Guatemala (SB)
Guinea	Central Bank of the Republic of Guinea
Guinea-Bissau	Banking Commission of the West African Monetary Union (CB-UMOA); Financial Markets Authority of the West African Monetary Union (AMF-UMOA); Regional Insurance Control Commission (CRCA)
Honduras	National Banks and Securities Commission
Hungary	European Securities and Markets Authority (ESMA); Hungarian National Bank (MNB); Hungarian Auditors' Public Oversight AUthority (KKH)
Iceland	Central Bank of Iceland
India	Reserve Bank of India (RBI) (including the Financial Services Institution Bureau); National Payments Corporation of India (NPCI); Deposit Insurance and Credit Guarantee Corporation (DICGC); Securities and Exchange Board of India (SEBI); Insolvency and Bankruptcy Board of India (IBBI); Insurance Regulatory and Development Authority (IRDAI); Pension Fund Regulatory and Development Authority (PFRDA); National Financial Reporting Authority (NFRA); Financial Stability and Development Council (FSDC)
Indonesia	Bank Indonesia (BI); Financial Services Authority (OJK); Deposit Insurance Agency (LPS)
Iran	Central Bank of Iran; Securities and Exchange Organization (SEO)
Iraq	Iraq Securities Commission (ISC)
Ireland	European Central Bank (ECB) through European Banking Supervision; European Securities and Markets Authority (ESMA); Single Resolution Board (SRB); Central Bank of Ireland; Pensions Authority; Irish Auditing and Accounting Supervisory Authority (IAASA)
Israel	Bank of Israel Israel Securities Authority (ISA); Capital Market, Insurance and Savings Authority (CMISA)
Italy	European Central Bank (ECB) through European Banking Supervision; European Securities and Markets Authority (ESMA); Single Resolution Board (SRB); Bank of Italy; Institute for the Supervision of Insurance (IVASS); Commissione Nazionale per le Società e la Borsa (CONSOB); Commissione di Vigilanza sui Fondi Pensione (COVIP)
Jamaica	Bank of Jamaica; Financial Services Commission (FSC)
Japan	Financial Services Agency (FSA), including; Securities and Exchange Surveillance Commission (SESC)
Jordan	Central Bank of Jordan; Jordan Securities Commission (JSC)
Kazakhstan	National Bank of Kazakhstan; Agency of the Republic of Kazakhstan for Regulation and Development of Financial Market (Қазақстан Республикасының Қаржы нарығын реттеу және дамыту агенттігі)
Kenya	Central Bank of Kenya; Capital Markets Authority (CMA); Insurance Regulatory Authority (IRA)
Kosovo	Central Bank of Kosovo
Kuwait	Central Bank of Kuwait; Capital Markets Authority (CMA)
Kyrgyzstan	State Service for Financial Market Regulation and Supervision (FSA)
Laos	Lao Securities Commission (LSC)
Latvia	European Central Bank (ECB) through European Banking Supervision; European Securities and Markets Authority (ESMA); Single Resolution Board (SRB); Bank of Latvia
Lebanon	Banking Control Commission of Lebanon (BCCL); Capital Market Authority (CMA); Insurance Control Commission (ICC)
Lesotho	Central Bank of Lesotho
Liechtenstein	Financial Market Authority (FMA)
Lithuania	European Central Bank (ECB) through European Banking Supervision; European Securities and Markets Authority (ESMA); Single Resolution Board (SRB); Bank of Lithuania
Luxembourg	European Central Bank (ECB) through European Banking Supervision; European Securities and Markets Authority (ESMA); Single Resolution Board (SRB); Commission de Surveillance du Secteur Financier (CSSF); Commissariat aux Assurances (CAA)
Malawi	Reserve Bank of Malawi
Malaysia	Central Bank of Malaysia; Securities Commission Malaysia
Maldives	Maldives Monetary Authority; Capital Market Development Authority (CMDA)
Mali	Banking Commission of the West African Monetary Union (CB-UMOA); Financial Markets Authority of the West African Monetary Union (AMF-UMOA); Regional Insurance Control Commission (CRCA)
Malta	European Central Bank (ECB) through European Banking Supervision; European Securities and Markets Authority (ESMA); Single Resolution Board (SRB); Malta Financial Services Authority (MFSA); Malta Accountancy Board; Financial Intelligence Analysis Unit
Mauritania	Central Bank of Mauritania
Mauritius	Bank of Mauritius; Financial Services Commission (FSC)
Mexico	Comisión Nacional Bancaria y de Valores (CNBV); Comisión Nacional de Seguros y Fianzas (CNSF); Comisión Nacional para la Protección y Defensa de los Usuarios de Servicios Financieros (CONDUSEF)
Moldova	National Commission for Financial Markets
Monaco	Commission de Contrôle des Activités Financières (CCAF)
Mongolia	Bank of Mongolia; Financial Regulatory Commission (FRC)
Montenegro	Central Bank of Montenegro; Capital Market Authority of Montenegro (SCMN); Insurance Supervision Agency
Morocco	Moroccan Capital Market Authority (AMMC); Autorité de Contrôle des Assurances et de la Prévoyance Sociale (ACAPS)
Mozambique	Bank of Mozambique; Instituto de Supervisão de Seguros de Moçambique (ISSM)
Namibia	Namibia Financial Institutions Supervisory Authority (NAMFISA)
Nepal	Nepal Rastra Bank; Securities Board of Nepal (SEBON); Nepal Insurance Authority (Beema Samiti)
Netherlands	European Central Bank (ECB) through European Banking Supervision; European Securities and Markets Authority (ESMA); Single Resolution Board (SRB); De Nederlandsche Bank; Netherlands Authority for the Financial Markets (AFM)
New Zealand	Reserve Bank of New Zealand (RBNZ); Financial Markets Authority (FMA)
Niger	Banking Commission of the West African Monetary Union (CB-UMOA); Financial Markets Authority of the West African Monetary Union (AMF-UMOA); Regional Insurance Control Commission (CRCA)
Nigeria	Central Bank of Nigeria; Securities and Exchange Commission (SEC); National Insurance Commission (NAICOM); National Pension Commission (PENCOM)
North Macedonia	National Bank of North Macedonia; Securities and Exchange Commission (SEC); Insurance Supervision Agency (ISA)
Norway	Financial Supervisory Authority (Finanstilsynet)
Oman	Capital Market Authority
Pakistan	State Bank of Pakistan (SBP); Securities and Exchange Commission of Pakistan (SECP); Financial Monitoring Unit (FMU); National Accountability Bureau (NAB); Federal investigation Agency (FIA); Audit Oversight Board (AOB)
Palestine	Palestine Capital Market Authority (PCMA)
Panama	Superintendencia de Bancos de Panamá; Superintendencia del Mercado de Valores; Superintendencia de Seguros y Reaseguros de Panamá
Papua New Guinea	Bank of Papua New Guinea; Securities Commission of Papua New Guinea (SCPNG)
Paraguay	Central Bank of Paraguay; National Securities Commission (CNV)
Peru	Superintendencia de Banca, Seguros y AFP (SBS); Superintendencia del Mercado de Valores (SMV)
Philippines	Bangko Sentral ng Pilipinas (BSP); Insurance Commission (IC); Philippine Deposit Insurance Corporation (PDIC); Securities and Exchange Commission (SEC)
Poland	European Securities and Markets Authority (ESMA); Financial Supervision Authority (KNF); Polish Bank Guarantee Fund (BFG); Polish General Inspector of Financial Information (GIIF); Polish Audit Oversight Agency (PANA)
Portugal	European Central Bank (ECB) through European Banking Supervision; European Securities and Markets Authority (ESMA); Single Resolution Board (SRB); Bank of Portugal; Portuguese Securities Market Commission (CMVM); Autoridade de Supervisão de Seguros e Fundos de Pensões (ASF)
Qatar	Qatar Central Bank; Qatar Financial Markets Authority (QFMA)
Romania	European Securities and Markets Authority (ESMA); National Bank of Romania; Financial Supervisory Authority (ASF); Autoritatea pentru Supravegherea Publică a Activităţii de Audit Statutar (ASPAAS)
Russia	Central Bank of Russia
Rwanda	National Bank of Rwanda; Capital Market Authority (CMA)
Saint Lucia	Eastern Caribbean Central Bank; Financial Sector Supervision Unit
Saint Kitts and Nevis	Eastern Caribbean Central Bank; Financial Services Regulatory Commission; Nevis Financial Regulatory Services Commission
Saint Vincent and the Grenadines	Eastern Caribbean Central Bank; Financial Services Authority
Samoa	Central Bank of Samoa; Samoa International Finance Authority
San Marino	Central Bank of San Marino (BCSM)
Saudi Arabia	Saudi Central Bank (SAMA); Capital Market Authority (CMA)
Senegal	Banking Commission of the West African Monetary Union (CB-UMOA); Financial Markets Authority of the West African Monetary Union (AMF-UMOA); Regional Insurance Control Commission (CRCA)
Serbia	National Bank of Serbia; Securities Commission (SEC)
Seychelles	Central Bank of Seychelles; Financial Services Authority (FSA Seychelles)
Singapore	Monetary Authority of Singapore; Accounting and Corporate Regulatory Authority (ACRA)
Slovakia	European Central Bank (ECB) through European Banking Supervision; European Securities and Markets Authority (ESMA); Single Resolution Board (SRB); National Bank of Slovakia; Slovak Resolution Council; Slovak Audit Supervision Office (UDVA)
Slovenia	European Central Bank (ECB) through European Banking Supervision; European Securities and Markets Authority (ESMA); Single Resolution Board (SRB); Bank of Slovenia; Securities Market Agency (ATVP); Insurance Supervision Agency (AZN); SLovenian Public Audit Oversight Agency (ANR)
South Africa	South African Reserve Bank hosting the Prudential Authority; National Credit Regulator; Financial Sector Conduct Authority (FSCA)
South Korea	Financial Services Commission (FSC); Financial Supervisory Service (FSS); Korea Deposit Insurance Corporation (KDIC)
Spain	European Central Bank (ECB) through European Banking Supervision; European Securities and Markets Authority (ESMA); Single Resolution Board (SRB); Bank of Spain; National Securities Market Commission (CNMV); Fondo de Reestructuración Ordenada Bancaria (FROB); Dirección General de Seguros y Fondos de Pensiones (DGSFP); Instituto de Contabilidad y Auditoría de Cuentas (ICAC); SEPBLAC
Sri Lanka	Central Bank of Sri Lanka; Securities and Exchange Commission (SEC); Insurance Regulatory Commission of Sri Lanka (IRCSL)
Suriname	Central Bank of Suriname
Sweden	European Securities and Markets Authority (ESMA); Financial Supervisory Authority (Finansinspektionen); Swedish Inspectorate of Auditors (Revisorsinspektionen); Swedish National Debt Office (Riksgalden, bank resolution authority)
Switzerland	Swiss Financial Market Supervisory Authority (FINMA)
Syria	Central Bank of Syria; Syrian Commission on Financial Markets and Securities (SCFMS); Syrian Insurance Supervisory Commission
Taiwan	Financial Supervisory Commission (FSC)
Tanzania	Capital Markets and Securities Authority (CMSA); Tanzania Insurance Regulatory Authority (TIRA)
Thailand	Bank of Thailand; Securities and Exchange Commission (SEC); Office of Insurance Commission (OIC)
Togo	Banking Commission of the West African Monetary Union (CB-UMOA); Financial Markets Authority of the West African Monetary Union (AMF-UMOA); Regional Insurance Control Commission (CRCA)
Trinidad and Tobago	Central Bank of Trinidad and Tobago; Trinidad and Tobago Securities and Exchange Commission (TTSEC)
Tunisia	Conseil du marché financier (CMF); Comité Général des Assurances (CGA)
Turkey	Banking Regulation and Supervision Agency (BRSA); Capital Markets Board (SPK); Insurance and Private Pension Regulation and Supervision Agency (IPRSA); Savings Deposit Insurance Fund of Turkey
Uganda	Bank of Uganda; Capital Markets Authority (CMA); Insurance Regulatory Authority of Uganda
Ukraine	National Bank of Ukraine; National Securities and Stock Market Commission (NSSMC)
United Arab Emirates	Central Bank of the UAE; Capital Market Authority (CMA); Insurance Authority (IA)
United Kingdom	Prudential Regulation Authority (PRA); Financial Conduct Authority (FCA); Financial Reporting Council (FRC); The Pensions Regulator (TPR)
United States	Federal Reserve; Federal Deposit Insurance Corporation (FDIC); Office of the Comptroller of the Currency (OCC); Consumer Financial Protection Bureau (CFPB); National Credit Union Administration (NCUA); Farm Credit Administration (FCA); Federal Housing Finance Agency (FHFA); Securities & Exchange Commission (SEC); Commodity Futures Trading Commission (CFTC); Public Company Accounting Oversight Board (PCAOB); Financial Crimes Enforcement Network (FinCEN)
Uruguay	Central Bank of Uruguay; Superintendencia de Servicios Financieros (SSF)
Uzbekistan	Ministry of Economy and Finance of the Republic of Uzbekistan
Vanuatu	Reserve Bank of Vanuatu
Vatican City	Supervisory and Financial Information Authority
Venezuela	Superintendencia de las Instituciones del Sector Bancario de Venezuela (SUDEBAN); Superintendencia Nacional de Valores (SNV)
Vietnam	State Securities Commission (SSC)
Zambia	Securities and Exchange Commission (SEC Zambia); Pensions and Insurance Authority (PIA)
Zimbabwe	Reserve Bank of Zimbabwe (RBZ); Securities and Exchange Commission of Zimbabwe (SECZIM); Insurance and Pensions Commission (IPEC)

== Other authorities (subnational and dependencies) ==
Location	Dependency	Financial supervisory authorities
Bosnia and Herzegovina	Republika Srpska	Securities Commission of the Republika Srpska (SECRS)
Canada	Canadian Securities Administrators (CSA)	Alberta Securities Commission (ASC); Quebec Financial Markets Authority (AMF); British Columbia Securities Commission (BCSC); Ontario Securities Commission (OSC); Financial and Consumer Services Commission of New Brunswick (FCNB); Financial Services Regulatory Authority of Ontario (FSRA); British Columbia Financial Services Authority (BCFSA)
China	Hong Kong	Hong Kong Monetary Authority (HKMA); Hong Kong Securities and Futures Commission (SFC); Hong Kong Insurance Authority (IA); Hong Kong Mandatory Provident Fund Schemes Authority (MPFA); Hong Kong Accounting and Financial Reporting Council (AFRC); Monetary Authority of Macao
Denmark		Insurance Authority of the Faroe Islands for insurance, pension and mortgages; all other finance is regulated by the Danish Financial Supervisory Authority
Germany		Finance ministries of eight Länder, supervising regional stock exchanges
India	GIFT International Financial Services Centre	International Financial Services Centres Authority (IFSCA)
Kazakhstan	Astana International Financial Centre	Astana Financial Services Authority (AFSA)
Malaysia	Labuan International Business and Financial Centre	Labuan Financial Services Authority (Labuan FSA)
Netherlands		Central Bank of Aruba; Central Bank of Curaçao and Sint Maarten
Qatar	Qatar Financial Centre	Qatar Financial Centre Regulatory Authority (QFCRA)
United Arab Emirates	Abu Dhabi Global Market	Financial Services Regulatory Authority (FSRA)
United Arab Emirates	Dubai International Financial Center	Dubai Financial Services Authority (DFSA)
United Kingdom		Eastern Caribbean Central Bank; Anguilla Financial Services Commission (FSC); Bermuda Monetary Authority; British Virgin Islands Financial Services Commission (BVIFSC); Cayman Islands Monetary Authority; Gibraltar Financial Services Commission (FSC); Guernsey Financial Services Commission (GFSC); Isle of Man Financial Services Authority (IOMFSA); Jersey Financial Services Commission (JFSC); Montserrat Financial Services Commission; Turks and Caicos Islands Financial Services Commission (TCIFSC)
United States		State-level bank supervisors coordinating in Conference of State Bank Supervisors (CSBS); State-level insurance supervisors coordinating in National Association of Insurance Commissioners (NAIC)

== See also ==
- Financial regulation
- Banking regulation and supervision
- Securities commission
- List of stock exchanges
- List of company registers
- List of central banks
