= COBAC =

African supranational banking supervisor

The Central African Banking Commission (French: COmmission Bancaire de l'Afrique Centrale, COBAC) is a supranational bank supervisor established in 1993 and based in Libreville, Gabon. It is institutionally part of the Bank of Central African States (French acronym BEAC) and is the single banking supervisor for the six countries of the Economic and Monetary Community of Central Africa (CEMAC), namely Cameroon, the Central African Republic, Chad, Equatorial Guinea, Gabon, and the Republic of the Congo.

== Overview ==
On 16 October 1990, following similar reform pioneered by the Central Bank of West African States earlier the same year, the member states decided to pool their banking supervision and created the COBAC for that purpose within the BEAC. On 17 January 1992, a follow-up agreement harmonized banking regulation in the region, paving the way for the effective establishment of the COBAC in January 1993. The COBAC is chaired by the Governor of the BEAC and managed by a permanent secretary-general.

In late 2011, the COBAC moved from its temporary location in Yaoundé to Libreville. That same year, a common deposit insurance fund (French: Fonds de Garantie des Dépôts en Afrique Centrale, FOGADAC) entered into force. This did not immediately result, however, in a full banking union, because the financial burden of bank crisis management and resolution has remained at the national level.

On 1 January 2025, COBAC (Central African Banking Commission) grants CEMAC (Central African Economic and Monetary Community) banks the possibility of opening branches in the six CEMAC countries, with a single authorization.

== Supervised entities by country ==
- List of banks in Cameroon
- List of banks in the Central African Republic
- List of banks in Chad
- List of banks in Equatorial Guinea
- List of banks in Gabon
- List of banks in the Republic of the Congo

== See also ==
- Central African Financial Market Supervisory Commission (COSUMAF)
- Regional Insurance Control Commission (CRCA)
- Banking Commission of the West African Monetary Union (CB-UMOA)
- Eastern Caribbean Central Bank (ECCB)
- European Banking Supervision
- List of financial supervisory authorities by country
