= Financial Services Commission (Barbados) =

Government agency of Barbados

Agency overview
- Formed: April 1, 2011
- Preceding agencies: Securities Commission; Supervisor of Insurance; Co-operatives Department
- Jurisdiction: Government of Barbados
- Headquarters: Bay Corporate Building, Bay Street, St. Michael, Barbados; 13°4′54.93″N 59°36′27.31″W
- Minister responsible: Mia Mottley
- Agency executives: Sir Patterson Cheltenham, Chairman; Warrick Ward, Chief Executive Officer; Rosina Knight, Deputy Chief Executive Officer Supervision & Regulation
- Parent department: Ministry of Finance, Economic Affairs and Investment
- Website: https://www.fsc.gov.bb/

The Financial Services Commission (FSC) is a financial supervisory authority responsible for the regulation, supervision and inspection of non-banking financial services in the corporate sector and global business in Barbados. It was established on 1 April 2011 under the Financial Services Commission Act 2010 which replaced the former Securities Commission, Supervisor of Insurance, and the Co-operatives Department. It contains 4 regulatory divisions: The insurance division, the credit union division, the securities division, and the pensions division. The FSC is housed under the portfolio of the Barbados Ministry of Finance.

== Organization Structure ==
The authority is governed by a Board of Commissioners appointed by the Minister of Finance and Economic Affairs. The Commissioners, a chairman and six others, hold office for a period of three years, with each member being eligible for re-appointment. The board sets policy and within a framework of effective controls, has ultimate responsibility for providing leadership and oversight to FSC's operations.

== See also ==
- Economy of Barbados
- Regulatory Authority
- List of company registers
- Central Bank of Barbados
- List of financial supervisory authorities by country
