= Canadian Public Accountability Board =

Canadian overseer of accounting firms

- Abbreviation: CPAB
- Formation: April 14, 2003; 23 years ago
- Founder: Canadian Securities Administrators; Office of the Superintendent of Financial Institutions; Canadian Institute of Chartered Accountants
- Type: NGO
- VAT ID no.: 890500705RC0001
- Registration no.: 4157826
- Legal status: Not-for-profit corporation
- Purpose: National audit regulator with respect to public reporting issuers
- Location: Toronto, Ontario
- Chair: Richard Payette
- Chief Executive Officer: Sonny Randhawa
- Budget: $16,265,000 (2015)
- Revenue: $16,139,000 (2014)
- Expenses: $16,914,000 (2014)
- Website: www.cpab-ccrc.ca

The Canadian Public Accountability Board (CPAB; French: Conseil canadien sur la reddition de comptes) is a national body, organized by the Canadian Securities Administrators (CSA), that oversees Canadian accounting firms that perform auditing work.

== Formation ==
The CPAB was formed in 2003 as part of Canada's response to the occurrence of accounting scandals that were happening worldwide, such as at Enron and Worldcom. It was different in approach from the Sarbanes-Oxley Act adopted in the United States. In 2016, its CEO stated that the Board "encourages a more holistic approach to better understand the root causes of lapses in audit quality," in contrast to that taken by the US Public Company Accounting Oversight Board.

The CSA have specified that a "reporting issuer" (i.e., a publicly traded company) must have its financial statements audited by a "participating audit firm," being one that has entered into a participation agreement with the CPAB which has not been terminated. Its authority is reinforced through legislation passed at the provincial level, of which Ontario has passed the most extensive example.

== Scope ==
164 Canadian and 133 foreign firms have entered into participation agreements with the CPAB. These firms audit approximately 4,000 reporting issuers and 3,000 investment funds. Of these firms, fourteen are inspected annually, of which the Big Four account for 98% of total market capitalization on Canadian markets, and the other 10 large firms account for a further 1.5%. The other firms are subject to inspection on a triennial basis.

== Governance ==
The CPAB has two governing bodies. The Council of Governors consists of six members: the Superintendent of Financial Institutions, the Chair of the Ontario Securities Commission, the Chair of the Autorité des marchés financiers, the Chair of the Canadian Securities Administrators, (Note: when the Chair of the CSA is already a Chair of the OSC or AMF, the CSA will select an alternative Governor) a Governor selected by the CSA, and public accountant that has audit oversight regulatory experience, selected by the other five. In turn, the Council appoints the Board of Directors, who are responsible for supervising the activities of the organization.

== Deficiencies and controversies ==
A 2007-8 review by CPAB of financial statements audited by the Big Six firms revealed that of 130 audit files examined, 11 were found to have deficiencies.

In 2011, the Board raised concerns that auditors only reacted when issues were raised by its inspectors, and that they were not taking proactive measures to improve the quality of their work. The report also noted that the same findings were being noted year after year, and that the majority of deficiencies related to basic audit procedures. Little progress was seen to have occurred in 2012, and a low level of professional skepticism was still seen as a major issue in 2013.

In 2012, CPAB released a review it conducted of work done by Canadian audit firms with Chinese clients. It found flaws in 12 of the 24 companies examined, and barred one auditor from doing such work until it upgraded its procedures. This was significant, as, in 2011, 56 companies from China and other parts of Asia were listed on the TSX or TSX Venture Exchange, many getting their listings through reverse takeovers of dormant shell corporations, and Sino-Forest Corporation had collapsed in mid-year after irregularities were found in its financial results. In 2014, the Board reported that it was still experiencing difficulties in being able to review foreign operations of some Canadian-based companies.

Because of irregularities such as those occurring at Sino-Forest, the CSA issued proposals in 2013 to require mandatory notification of certain events to reporting issuers and regulatory authorities, which were subsequently adopted in 2014.

In November 2015, the Board reported that the incidence of significant findings in files examined was increasing, and that the most prominent audit issues concerned the execution of audit fundamentals and the understanding of a client's business processes that are relevant to financial reporting. A report earlier that year stated that the incidence of deficiencies observed appeared to be declining in files concerning the Big Four and other national/network firms, but was increasing in files concerning regional firms.

== See also ==
- List of financial supervisory authorities by country
