= XTB S.A. =

Polish fintech company

X-Trade Brokers Dom Maklerski SA
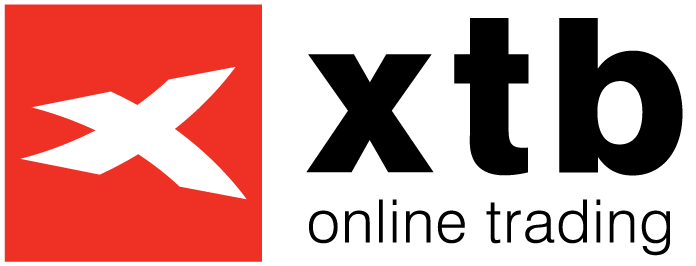
- Type: Spółka Akcyjna
- Traded as: WSE: XTB
- Industry: Stockbroker; Electronic trading platform
- Founded: 2002; 24 years ago
- Headquarters: Warsaw, Poland
- Area served: Worldwide
- Key people: Jakub Zabłocki (founder); Omar Arnaout (CEO)
- Revenue: ▲PLN 2 146.1 million (2025)
- Net income: ▼PLN 644.2 million (2025)
- Number of employees: 1,315 (2025)
- Website: XTB.com

XTB S.A. is a Warsaw-based brokerage firm that provides products, services, and technology solutions for trading various financial instruments, including foreign exchange (forex) and contracts for difference (CFDs). Founded in 2002 by Jakub Zabłocki, it is one of the world's largest publicly traded FX & CFD brokers, employing 1,315 people and serving more than 2.16 million clients globally by the end of 2025. XTB maintains offices in 15 countries and is regulated by the Polish Financial Supervision Authority (KNF), the Financial Conduct Authority (FCA), and the Cyprus Securities and Exchange Commission (CySEC), among others. It has been listed on the Warsaw Stock Exchange (WSE) since 2016.

By the end of 2025, XTB had more than 1.19 million active clients. Its total operating income for 2025 reached PLN 2.15 billion, up from PLN 1.87 billion in 2024, while net profit fell to PLN 644.2 million from PLN 856.9 million.

The firm has faced multiple regulatory actions: in 2018, the KNF imposed a PLN 9.9 million (USD 2.7 million) fine citing "asymmetric price slippage"; in 2021, France's Financial Markets Authority (AMF) fined XTB for compliance failures; in 2023, Brazil's securities regulator (CVM) issued a stop order against the broker for operating without a local license; and in 2026, the KNF imposed a PLN 20 million (about $5.5 million) fine over MiFID II and investor protection breaches related to CFDs.

== History ==
The company was founded in 2002 by Jakub Zabłocki (b. 1975), an economics graduate from the University of Łódź and former mBank employee. He launched Dom Maklerski X-Trade Brokers with 300,000 Polish złoty (PLN).

On 21 November 2005, the company received its brokerage license from the Polish Financial Supervision Authority (KNF), enabling it to offer services for all financial instruments. In 2007, the company opened its first foreign branch in the Czech Republic, followed by expansions into Germany, Spain, Romania, Slovakia, France, Portugal, Italy, and Hungary over the next two years.

In 2009, it rebranded as XTB Online Trading. That year, its net profits exceeded €12 million, and by 2010, XTB had established itself as the largest forex and CFD brokerage in Central and Eastern Europe. In October 2010, Enterprise Investors acquired a minority stake in XTB for €57 mln. The deal elevated Zabłocki to the top of the richest people in Poland.

In May 2016, XTB was listed on the Warsaw Stock Exchange (WSE). The successful debut boosted its valuation to approximately 1.8 billion PLN. Revenue for 2016 was reported at 250 million PLN. At that time, Zabłocki held 66% of the company's shares, with an estimated net worth of 950 million PLN, placing him 27th on the Forbes Poland list of the country's richest people.

By late 2017, XTB operated in 13 countries and served approximately 20,000 active clients. During that period, it faced a damaging scandal involving a large KNF fine and allegations of fund misappropriation, which led to a dramatic two-thirds drop in share price within two hours. The WSE responded by temporarily suspending trading in XTB shares.

In the first quarter of 2020, amid heightened market volatility at the onset of the COVID-19 pandemic, XTB reported record quarterly revenue of $79 million (307 million PLN), surpassing its total revenue for 2019. In July 2021, it obtained a license from the Dubai Financial Services Authority (DFSA). XTB later announced that 2022 was its most profitable year to date, with a net profit of $174 million.

In April 2023, following a launch in Romania, XTB introduced fractional shares and exchange-traded funds (ETFs) in the Czech Republic, Portugal, and Slovakia, subsequently extending these offerings to Poland and Spain. In May 2023, its share price reached a record 43.88 PLN, and the firm reported reaching a total of 274,450 clients. By the third quarter of 2024, XTB's revenue hit $118 million, with a monthly trading volume of $232 billion.

In January 2024, the company announced plans to diversify its product line beyond FX/CFD services to include bonds, retirement products, and other investment offerings. In October, it introduced a mobile wallet application with a multi-currency card. For Polish clients, XTB implemented "IKE" (Individual Retirement Account) and "IKZE" (Individual Retirement Security Account) options. In 2024, XTB acquired an ISA license in the UK to enter the Individual Savings Accounts (ISAs) market. In December of the same year, XTB secured licenses in Indonesia and the United Arab Emirates.

Between May 2023 and September 2024, Zabłocki sold significant portions of his shareholding on three occasions for a combined reported total of approximately $319.49 million, reducing his stake to 43.78%. The company also paid a record dividend of $195 million in April 2024.

In January 2025, XTB announced plans to launch spot cryptocurrency trading. In December 2025, it obtained CySEC approval in Cyprus to offer spot crypto services through its local entity. In 2026, XTB began offering spot cryptocurrency trading, initially in Cyprus and later in Chile. In January 2026, it launched American-style, cash-settled stock options on selected U.S.-listed shares via its Cyprus-regulated unit. In April 2026, XTB expanded its stock options offering to Germany and Spain. In May 2026, the company extended the product to France, Portugal, the Czech Republic and Slovakia; Poland was still awaiting regulatory approval.

In March 2026, XTB agreed to sell its South African subsidiary, XTB Africa PTY Ltd, for $645,000. The subsidiary had received an FSCA licence in 2021 but had not started client-facing operations. In April 2026, XTB received Category 1 and Category 2 licences in the United Arab Emirates, upgrading from its previous Category 5 status and allowing the local entity to onboard clients and execute trades in the country.

== Operations ==
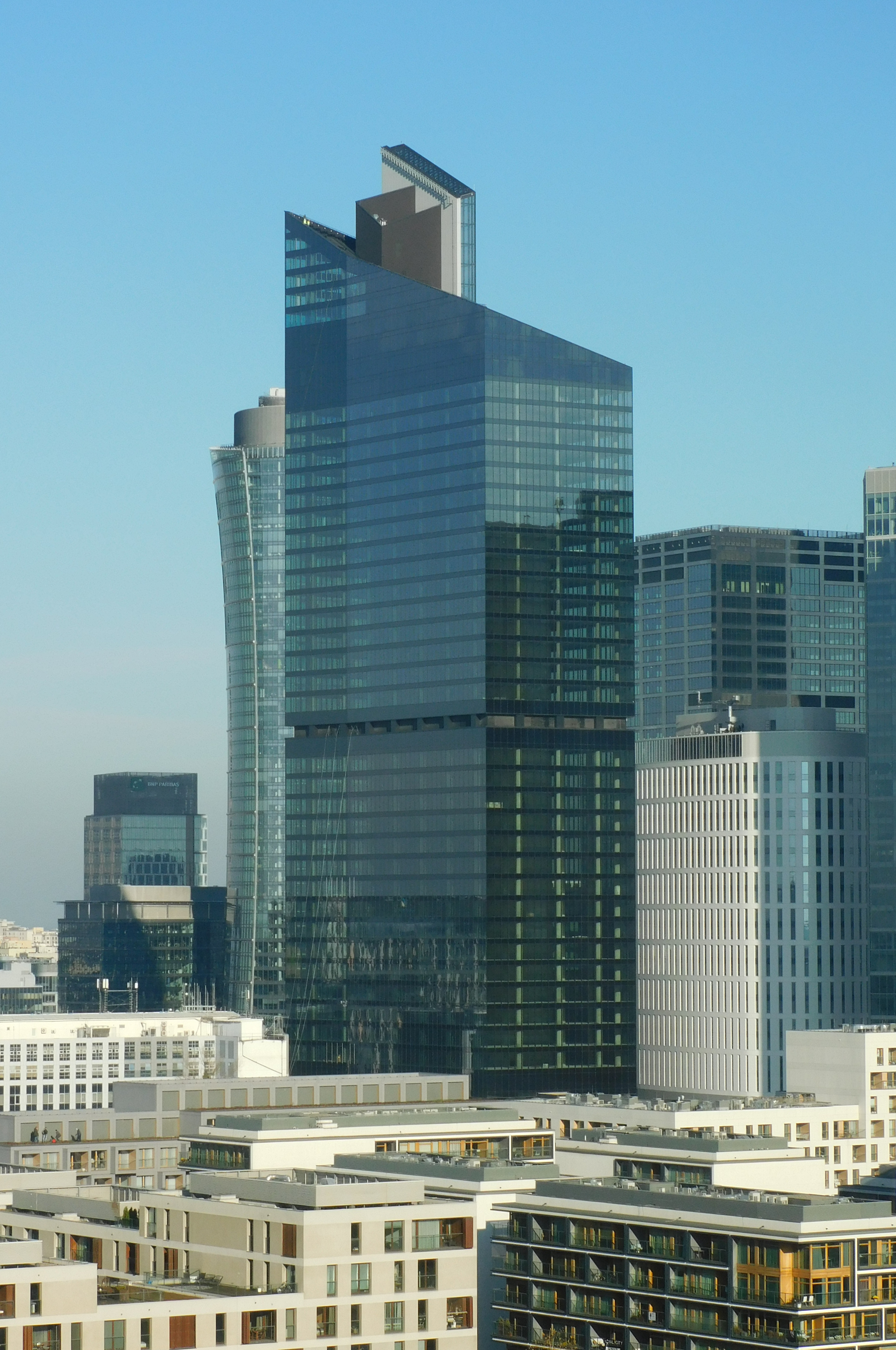
XTB has its headquarters at the Skyliner in Warsaw.

XTB provides products, services, and technology solutions for trading various financial instruments, primarily on the foreign exchange (forex) market and through contract for differences (CFD). The group's entities are regulated by the Financial Conduct Authority (FCA), the Cyprus Securities and Exchange Commission (CySEC), the Comisión Nacional del Mercado de Valores (CNMV), the International Financial Services Commission (IFSC), and the Polish Financial Supervision Authority (KNF).

As of 31 December 2025, XTB Group employed 1,315 people, up from 1,015 a year earlier, and operated from offices in 15 countries. As of October 2023, its active client base surpassed 474,000, and by April 2024, XTB reported reaching one million customers. By the end of 2025, the total number of XTB clients had surpassed 2.16 million, including more than 1.19 million active clients, compared with 1.36 million total clients and 658,520 active clients at the end of 2024.

For the full year 2025, XTB reported total operating income of PLN 2.146 billion, up 14.6% from PLN 1.873 billion in 2024, while operating profit fell 15.6% to PLN 832.4 million and net profit fell 24.8% to PLN 644.2 million. Total operating expenses rose to PLN 1.314 billion from PLN 886.7 million, including marketing costs of PLN 584.9 million (2024: PLN 344.8 million) and salaries and employee benefits of PLN 413.0 million (2024: PLN 311.6 million). In 2025, XTB added 864,286 new clients, compared with 498,438 in 2024.

In the first half of 2026, XTB reported operating revenue of PLN 2.09 billion, up 79.7% year-on-year, and net profit of PLN 1.03 billion, up 150.5%. The company added more than 703,000 new clients during the period, while the number of active clients approached 1.5 million.

== Marketing ==
In 2010, XTB signed a sponsorship agreement with McLaren Formula One team. On 30 August 2013, Romanian broker Vlad Moise used the XTB online platform to execute a trade on Mont Blanc.

XTB's list of brand ambassadors has included Mads Mikkelsen, José Mourinho, Joanna Jędrzejczyk, Iker Casillas, and Conor McGregor. Zlatan Ibrahimović joined in 2024, followed by Tyson Fury in 2025.

In September 2024, XTB announced sponsorship of the UAE National Boxing team and of the Polish team of young economists participating in the Economics Olympiad in Greece.

In April 2026, XTB became a global partner of FIBA under an agreement running through December 2027, covering the 2026 FIBA Women's Basketball World Cup, the FIBA Basketball World Cup 2027 and worldwide qualifying rounds for the men's tournament. Later that month, XTB became SSC Napoli's global trading partner for the 2025–26 and 2026–27 seasons.

== Controversies ==
=== KNF $2.7 mln fine and misappropriation accusations ===
Following XTB's IPO, the Polish Financial Supervision Authority (KNF) examined the company's activities between January 2014 and May 2016. According to documents later cited by Puls Biznesu, the KNF's Commission identified nearly 50 potential violations and issued 47 post-inspection recommendations. The report, finalized in October 2016, was not made public. XTB denied any wrongdoing and submitted its own response, contesting the Commission’s comments.

In November 2017, Puls Biznesu published an article alleging that XTB engaged in improper practices, referring to the KNF's report and accusing the company of misappropriating client funds.

In September 2018, the KNF imposed a fine of PLN 9.9 million (USD 2.7 million), indicating that from January 2014 to May 2015, the broker had not acted in clients' best interests. The KNF concluded that XTB employed "asymmetric price slippage," passing on execution losses to clients while delaying certain orders. An independent expert evaluated transaction data for nearly 20 million orders; customer losses were estimated between PLN 8 million and PLN 23.5 million, and "missed opportunities" reached PLN 84 million. XTB maintained that the practice affected only 3% of accounts it considered engaged in "scalping."

Newsweek Polska reported that, if the fine were upheld, six current and former board members could face prosecution under Article 286 of the Polish Criminal Code, which carries potential prison sentences. XTB appealed the decision to the Provincial Administrative Court, which rejected the request. In September 2019, the Warsaw Provincial Administrative Court confirmed the KNF's fine, dismissing the company’s cassation appeal.

In October 2019, members of the Trading Jam Foundation held a demonstration outside XTB's Warsaw offices, requesting compensation for retail investors who allegedly incurred losses linked to the company's actions. The group also criticized the KNF for delaying the disclosure of its inspection report, limiting investors' legal recourse.

Over five years, the investigative file expanded to 370 volumes, and more than 6,000 clients were questioned and granted victim status. In March 2023, the Supreme Administrative Court of Poland dismissed XTB's second cassation appeal and upheld the fine. XTB publicly disagreed with the outcome but confirmed it would comply with the payment. Meanwhile, nine additional client claims valued at PLN 9 million remained pending in court.

=== XTB vs Krzysztof Kramarczyk ===
In 2018, trader Krzysztof Kramarczyk accused XTB of deliberately slowing his transactions, allegedly causing him USD 1.2 million in losses, and failing to address his complaints. Between 2013 and 2016, Kramarczyk was among XTB's most active clients, occasionally generating about 5% of the firm's total retail turnover. He claimed that as his results improved, he experienced technical disruptions on the platform, including shutdowns and disconnections. While XTB's support attributed these issues to his devices or internet connection, Kramarczyk reported that the system functioned properly under a different account.

In 2017, after reviewing KNF materials on XTB's operations between January 2014 and May 2016, Kramarczyk launched a media campaign criticizing the company. In October of the same year, XTB filed a criminal complaint against him for alleged blackmail, asserting that he demanded PLN 3.5 million initially, later increasing the figure to PLN 7 million and then PLN 14 million. Kramarczyk countered that he was seeking compensation for his losses and that the KNF’s audit supported his allegations. As of February 2020, he was awaiting a hearing.

=== AMF fine ===
In November 2021, France's Financial Markets Authority (AMF) imposed a €300,000 fine on XTB, citing multiple compliance failures. The regulator found that between 2013 and 2020, the company had promoted CFDs to non-professional clients in France and published misleading advertisements, without sufficiently warning about the high risks involved. On at least one occasion, XTB reportedly did not inform its French clients about a technical problem that interfered with proper order execution.

=== Regulatory issues in Brazil ===
In May 2023, XTB faced regulatory scrutiny in Brazil when the Comissão de Valores Mobiliários (CVM), Brazil's financial regulator, issued a stop order against XTB International Limited. According to the CVM, XTB was actively marketing and offering brokerage services to Brazilian investors without holding the necessary regulatory license required under Brazilian law. The regulator ordered XTB to immediately cease all unauthorized solicitation and warned of imposing daily fines if the company failed to comply. In October 2025, XTB said it had received regulatory approval in Brazil in February 2025 but was reconsidering its plans to enter the market, citing "protectionist measures".

=== Cyberattacks and platform outage (2025) ===
In mid-2025, Polish media reported cases in which cybercriminals gained access to some XTB client accounts and used rapid transactions in illiquid stocks to generate losses for the victims. XTB stated that the incidents affected about 0.017% of its clients and that none of the affected accounts had two-factor authentication (2FA) enabled. In July–August 2025, XTB said it would reimburse clients who lost money due to cyberattacks and expanded account security measures, including making 2FA mandatory for all clients.

On 5 November 2025, XTB reported a platform incident that prevented some clients from modifying or closing certain CFD positions for several hours and temporarily suspended CFD trading while fixes were implemented. According to the company, the issue affected about 0.4% of roughly 25 million CFD positions and was caused by a technological limitation in a system component; functionality was restored later the same day.

=== KNF fine for MiFID II (2026) ===
In March 2026, the Polish Financial Supervision Authority (KNF) fined XTB PLN 20 million (about $5.5 million) for breaches of MiFID II conduct-of-business and investor protection requirements related to the sale of CFDs. The regulator faulted the broker for inadequate client checks for complex instruments, including deficiencies in appropriateness and suitability assessments, conflict-of-interest issues linked to a promoted "HOT list" of instruments, and providing incomplete or misleading information about the risks and costs of CFDs. Investor concerns over possible further KNF scrutiny of XTB's CFD business, the company's main source of revenue from financial instruments, coincided with a drop of more than 8% in its shares on 27 May 2026. XTB sought reconsideration of the decision, but on 28 August 2026 the KNF upheld the PLN 20 million fine in a final administrative decision.
