= Financial Services Commission (Jamaica) =

Agency overview
- Formed: August 2, 2001; 25 years ago
- Preceding agency: Unit Trusts and Securities Commission, Office of the Superintendent of Insurance
- Jurisdiction: Jamaica
- Headquarters: Kingston, Jamaica
- Website: www.fscjamaica.org

The Financial Services Commission (FSC) is the Jamaican unified financial supervisory authority. It was founded in the year 2001 under the Financial Services Commission Act of 2001. The FSC has the responsibility of regulating and supervising any of the country's institutions that engage in non-deposit-taking financial services in relation to insurance, acquisition or disposal of securities and units under a registered unit trust.

The authority also covers the regulation of national and international virtual asset service providers and trust service providers as well as the regulation of Anti–money laundering & Counter terrorism financing (AML/CFT)

== History ==
The Financial Services Commission was established to improved the Financial Supervision in Jamaica after the 1995 Financial Crisis. After the act was passed, the senior directors and key executive members were hired in November 2001. The General Manager was on-boarded in February 2002 and in April, the operations was started.

The institution replaced the two previous institutions named the Unit Trusts and the Securities Commission along with the Office of the Superintendent of Insurance (OSI). In an order to fulfil the purpose of its existence, FSC is divided into various divisions that include insurance, corporate facilities, securities, pensions, legal issues and investigations.

In 2020, FSC expanded the scope of its functions and also included the national and international virtual asset service providers and trust service providers. The institute also stepped up to improvise the regulations and practices as per the Anti-Money Laundering & Counter Financing of Terrorism (AML/CFT) framework - specifically for the non-banking sector. In 2021, FSC also worked to create mechanisms that could improve the market's price transparency and an easier flow of information to the investors.

== See also ==
- List of financial supervisory authorities by country
