= Financial Markets Authority of the West African Monetary Union =

African supranational securities authority

The Financial Markets Authority of the West African Monetary Union (French: Autorité des Marchés Financiers de l'Union Monétaire Ouest Africaine, AMF-UMOA) is a supranational markets regulator established in 1996 and based in Abidjan, Ivory Coast. It is the single securities authority for the eight countries of the West African Monetary Union (French acronym UMOA), namely Benin, Burkina Faso, Guinea Bissau, Ivory Coast, Mali, Niger, Senegal, and Togo. It was known from 1996 to 2020 as the Regional Council for Public Savings and Financial Markets (French: Conseil Régional de l'Epargne Publique et des Marchés Financiers, CREPMF).

== Overview ==
The creation of a supranational securities authority followed the integration of bank supervision with the establishment in 1990 of the Banking Commission of the West African Monetary Union. On 3 July 1996, an agreement was signed by the Council of Ministers of the West African Monetary Union that established the CREPMF as a body responsible for the protection of household savings invested in securities or any other type of investment through public offerings. Simultaneously, the member countries established a regional stock exchange (French: Bourse Régionale des Valeurs Mobilières, BRVM) and a Central Depository/ Settlement Bank (French: Dépositaire Central / Banque de Règlement, DC/BR).

The first members of the CREPMF were appointed in October 1997, and its General Regulation (French: règlement général) was adopted on 28 November 1997. The CREPMF authorized the BRVM and DC/BR the next day, and they started operations on 16 September 1998.

On 1 January 2021, nearly a quarter-century after the CREPFM's establishment, it was rebranded AMF-UMOA, aligning its name with that of the French securities authority, the Autorité des Marchés Financiers. This rebranding did not entail a change in the authority's mandate.

== Leadership ==
- Mamadou Ndiaye, chairman of CREPMF 2017-2021
- Badanam Patoki, chairman of AMF-UMOA 2021-

== See also ==
- Central African Financial Market Supervisory Commission (COSUMAF)
- European Securities and Markets Authority (ESMA)
- Regional Insurance Control Commission (CRCA)
- List of financial supervisory authorities by country
