= Financial Market Authority (Liechtenstein) =

Agency overview
- Formed: 1 January 2005
- Jurisdiction: Principality of Liechtenstein
- Headquarters: Vaduz, Liechtenstein
- Employees: 80
- Agency executive: Dr. Roland Müller, Chairman
- Website: http://www.fma-li.li

The Financial Market Authority (German: Finanzmarktaufsicht) is the primary financial regulatory agency of the Principality of Liechtenstein. It is an independent, integrated financial market supervisory authority operating under public law and covers all financial markets in Liechtenstein.

== History ==
The FMA was launched on 1 Jan 2005 as an independent, integrated financial market supervisory authority. As financial markets are an important part of Economy of Liechtenstein, it accounts for about a quarter of GDP, the Government and Parliament of Liechtenstein committed themselves to a strong and independent financial regulator.

=== Significant Incidents ===
In 2008 a former data entry clerk at LGT Group, a trust regulated by the FMA, stole data from the bank and sold it to tax authorities in other countries, sparking the 2008 Liechtenstein tax affair which threatened Liechtenstein's financial sector. The FMA had significant involvement in the investigation of the incident as well as working with the government to minimise the damage caused to the whole financial sector.

In June 2009 the Liechtenstein parliament discussed and criticized the increased financial expenditures for financial market supervision. The FMA responded saying "...that it took this discussion seriously and drew attention to the demands on supervisory authorities of internationally oriented financial centers have increased, irrespective of the size of a financial center. It also noted that the Government and Parliament have expressly committed themselves to an independent and strong Financial Market Authority."

== Responsibilities and functions ==
The FMA is responsible for safeguarding the stability of the financial market, protection of clients, prevention of abuse, and the implementation of and compliance with recognized international standards.

Its core principles are;

1. Supervision - supervise consistently and fairly, granting licenses, fight abuses and punish violations.
2. Regulation - regulate with stakeholders, meeting international standards taking into account the competitiveness of the Liechtenstein financial market.
3. External relations - cultivate dialogue with other international agencies
4. Enterprise - independent, internally organized according to private sector principles.
5. Team - Value each other in our interactions.

The FMA covers the regulation of banks, insurance companies and intermediaries, pensions funds, investment companies, asset management companies and other financial intermediaries.

Through Liechtenstein’s membership of the European Economic Area (EEA) licenses issued by FMA allow companies to operate some services through all member countries of the EEA.

== Structure ==
- The Board
  - Prof. Dr. Roland Müller, Chairman
  - Michèle Borgeaud, Vice Chairwoman
  - Dr. Ivo Furrer
  - Jürg Meier
  - Dr. Michael Ritter
- General Management
  - Mario Gassner, CEO
  - Dr. Alexander Imhof, Deputy of the CEO, Head of Insurance and Pension Fund Division
  - Dr. Marcel Lötscher, Head of Securities and Markets Division
  - Patrick Bont, Head of Banking Division, Head of Other Financial Intermediaries Division a. i.
  - Martin Schädler, Head of Central Services
  - Werner Meyer, Head of Anti-Money Laundering and DNFBP Division

== See also ==
- Securities Commission
- List of financial supervisory authorities by country
