= Capital Markets Board of Turkey =

Financial regulatory and supervisory agency

- Sermaye Piyasası Kurulu

Agency overview
- Formed: 1982
- Jurisdiction: Turkey
- Headquarters: Ankara, Turkey
- Employees: 545 (2010)
- Agency executive: Vedat Akgiray, Chairman (2009)
- Website: www.cmb.gov.tr

The Capital Markets Board of Turkey (CMB; Turkish: Sermaye Piyasası Kurulu) is the financial regulatory and supervisory agency of Turkey. Its board is appointed by the Turkish finance ministry.

== History ==
The CMB was created in 1982 with the passing of the Capital Markets Law (CML) in 1981. This was followed by a number of further laws and decrees that expanded its functions and responsibilities. The most significant of these changes was Law No. 4487 which was passed in December 1999, which brought in a set of amendments to the Capital Market Law expanding the duties and the scope of authority. This included increased consumer protection and changes to allow dematerlisation of stocks and other changes to make the markets more flexible and able to use information technology.

== Responsibilities and functions ==
The CMB is responsible for safeguarding the stability of the financial market, consumer protections and supervising participants in the stock market.

== Structure ==
The Chairman who is also the CEO is responsible for the administration and representation of the CMB and sits on a board which consists of seven Commissioners.

The Council of Ministers appoints two members from four nominations by the Ministry of State Responsible for the Economy. The other five members are appointed from the nominations of the "Ministry of Finance", the "Ministry of Industry and Commerce", the "Banking Regulatory and Supervisory Board", the "Association of Trade Chambers and Exchanges", and the "Association of Capital Markets Intermediary Institutions". Each of these institutions nominates two candidates, one of whom is to be elected.

== See also ==
- Securities Commission
- Istanbul Stock Exchange
- Economy of Turkey
- List of financial supervisory authorities by country
