= Croatian Financial Services Supervisory Agency =

Financial supervisory authority in Croatia

- Hrvatska agencija za nadzor financijskih usluga
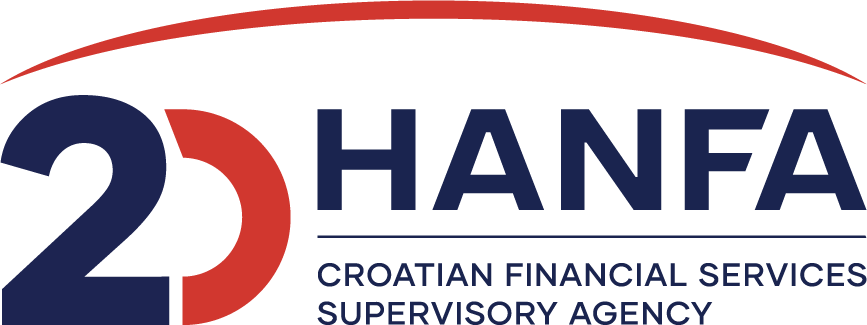

Agency overview
- Formed: 1 January 2006; 20 years ago
- Preceding agency: Securities Commission of Croatia, Pension Fund and Insurance Supervisory Agency, Insurance Supervision Directorate
- Jurisdiction: Croatia
- Headquarters: Ulica Franje Račkoga 6, Zagreb, Croatia
- Employees: 165 (2025 estimate)
- Agency executive: Anamarija Staničić (acting) since 19 June 2026, President of the Board
- Website: hanfa.hr

The Croatian Financial Services Supervisory Agency, (HANFA) (Croatian: Hrvatska agencija za nadzor financijskih usluga), is the main financial supervisory authority in Croatia together with the Croatian National Bank. Its remit covers capital markets, insurance and occupational pensions.

Under European Union policy frameworks, HANFA is a voting member of the respective Boards of Supervisors of the European Insurance and Occupational Pensions Authority (EIOPA) and European Securities and Markets Authority (ESMA). It is also a member of the European Systemic Risk Board (ESRB).

== History ==
HANFA started operations on 1 January 2006, by merging merger of the prior Securities Commission (Komisija za vrijednosne papire, KVP, est. 1997), Pension Fund and Insurance Supervisory Agency (Agencija za nadzor mirovinskih fondova i osiguranja, known as HAGENA, est. 2000), and Insurance Supervision Directorate (Direkcija za nadzor društava za osiguranje).

== Operations ==
HANFA is managed by a Board consisting of five members, one of whom is the President, assisted by a Secretary General.

=== Leadership ===
President of the Board	Term began	Term ended
Ante Samodol	1 January 2006	26 January 2012
Petar Pierre Matek	27 January 2012	7 February 2018
Ante Žigman	8 February 2018	19 June 2026
Anamarija Staničić (acting)	19 June 2026	Incumbent

== See also ==
- List of financial supervisory authorities by country
- List of banks in Croatia
