= PREF-CEMAC =

The PREF-CEMAC is the Economic and Financial Reform Program of the Economic and Monetary Community of Central African States (from its French form, Programme des Reformes Économiques et Financières de la Communauté Économique et Monétaire de l'Afrique centrale). It is an institution set up in 2016 to respond to the shock caused to the economies by the fall in oil prices on the six CEMAC member countries (Cameroon, Central African Republic, Chad, Equatorial Guinea, Gabon, and the Republic of Congo), five of which are dependent on petroleum exports for a large share of fiscal revenue and foreign currency receipts.

== Institutional structure ==
At the time it was set up, Congo President Sassou-N'Guesso was selected as President of the PREF-CEMAC (and remains so as of late 2024). He chairs a Steering Committee made up of two government ministers from each of the six countries, plus the heads of the CEMAC commission, the regional central bank, and other regional bodies. There is a Monitoring Unit, essentially made up of representatives of the Steering Committee, and a Technical Secretariat with past-time service from specialists in the various CEMAC bodies.

== Actions taken ==
The PREF-CEMAC was initially charged with designing and carrying out "rapid, vigorous, and coordinated actions" to restore macroeconomic health to a region in recession. An initial set of 21 measures was adopted. At the same time, member countries were charged with negotiating a stabilization program with the International Monetary Fund (IMF).

Results were broadly positive: growth returned, foreign exchange reserves rose, as did fiscal revenues; two regional financial markets were consolidated; free circulation of goods and persons in the CEMAC area was finally implemented; donor funds were raised to carry out major regional construction projects; and countries successfully negotiated and implemented IMF programs.

Much of the progress realized was reversed in 2020 with the advent of the COVID-19 pandemic. In response, CEMAC members agreed a Phase II for the CREF-CEMAC, covering 2021-25, including the negotiation of "second generation" programs with the IMF.

The World Bank now published regular updates on progress in implementation.
