= List of banks in Niger =

This is a list of commercial banks in Niger, as updated in September 2024 by the Banking Commission of the West African Monetary Union.

== List of commercial banks ==
- Bank of Africa - Niger (BOA-Niger), part of Bank of Africa Group
- Banque Agricole du Niger (BAGRI)
- Banque Atlantique Niger, part of BCP Group
- Banque Commerciale du Niger (BCN)
- Banque de l'Habitat du Niger (BHN)
- Banque Internationale pour l'Afrique au Niger (BIA-Niger)
- Banque Islamique du Niger (BIN)
- Banque Sahélo-Saharienne pour l'Investissement et le Commerce - Niger, part of BSIC Group
- Ecobank - Niger, part of Ecobank Group
- Société Nigérienne de Banque (Sonibank)
- Branch of Banque Régionale de Marchés
- Branch of CBAO Groupe Attijariwafa Bank
- Branch of Coris Bank International
- Branch of Orabank Côte d'Ivoire, part of Orabank Group

== See also ==
- Economy of Niger
- List of banks in Africa
