= Office of Insurance Commission =

Regulator of insurance industry in Thailand

- สำนักงานคณะกรรมการกำกับและส่งเสริมการประกอบธุรกิจประกันภัย

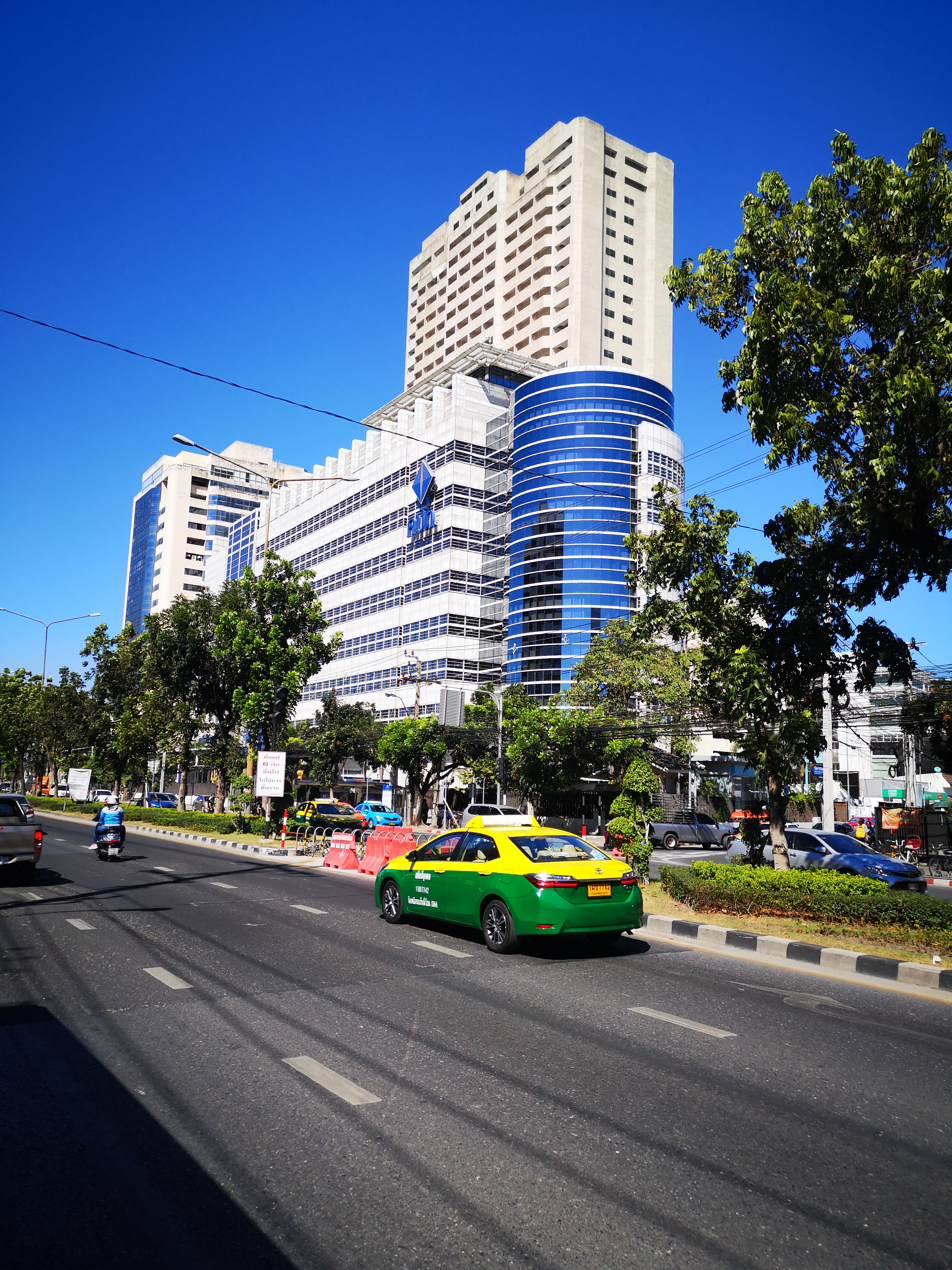
- OIC HQ on Ratchadaphisek road in 2020

Agency overview
- Formed: 1 September 2007; 18 years ago
- Jurisdiction: Kingdom of Thailand
- Headquarters: Bangkok, Thailand; 13.8164°N 100.5759°E
- Employees: 600
- Agency executive: Chuchat Pramoolpol, Secretary-General
- Parent department: Ministry of Finance
- Website: Official website

The Office of Insurance Commission (OIC) (Thai: สำนักงานคณะกรรมการกำกับและส่งเสริมการประกอบธุรกิจประกันภัย) is the regulator of Thailand’s insurance industry operating under the supervision of the Thai Minister of Finance. The OIC is empowered to regulate insurance companies, brokers and agents and was established under the Thailand Government Insurance Commission Act B.E. 2550 which summarized the role of the Commission as "to supervise and promote insurance business conduct". Prior to this, insurance is regulated by the Department of Insurance, part of the Thai Ministry of Commerce.

The OIC is responsible for the issue of operating licenses for insurance companies and operational adherence to regulations through market supervision.

Ensuring insurers adhere to capital adequacy requirements is an important aspect of the ongoing market supervision role of the OIC. Thailand implemented a risk-based capital (RBC) framework in 2011 aligning the Thai insurance industry to many other Asian economies including Japan (since 1997), Indonesia (since 2000), Taiwan (since 2002), Singapore (since 2004), Malaysia (since 2009), South Korea, The Philippines and Thailand (since 2011). From 1 January 2013 life insurers and reinsurers were required to maintain a minimum level of capital of THB500 million and general insurers/reinsurers THB300 million with a minimum solvency margin of 140 percent.

In 2010 the OIC in anticipation of the planned move to a risk-based capital measure of solvency in 2011, issued a five-year strategic development plan for the Thai insurance industry in which the OIC recognised that with more than 90 licensed insurers in the Kingdom at that time, industry consolidation was both desirable and necessary as many market participants would be inadequately capitalised when the full ramifications of the RBC approach were felt. Other salient points in this plan included the recognition that in addition to undercapitalisation in some areas, the industry also suffered in places from being sub-scale and thus inefficient, posing a threat to the industry's international competitiveness, particularly as competition may increase following the relaxation of trade and commerce restrictions among members of ASEAN, commencing in 2015. The Plan recommended in addition to consolidation that the industry seek the more active involvement of multinational insurance groups able to provide the necessary capital as well as expertise to ensure the Thai insurance industry remains internationally benchmarked.

== See also ==
- List of financial supervisory authorities by country
