= Capital Market Authority (Saudi Arabia) =

Saudi government financial regulatory authority

Capital Market Authority (CMA)
- هيئة السوق المالية

Agency overview
- Formed: July 2003; 23 years ago
- Jurisdiction: The Kingdom of Saudi Arabia
- Headquarters: Riyadh, Saudi Arabia
- Agency executive: Mazen Turki Al-Sudairi, Chairman
- Website: www.cma.gov.sa

The Capital Market Authority (CMA; Arabic: هيئة السوق المالية) is the Saudi government's financial regulatory authority responsible for capital markets in Saudi Arabia. The CMA is a government organization applying full financial, legal, and administrative independence, and has direct links with the Prime Minister. Its responsibilities include setting and policing financial rules and regulations and developing the capital markets, this includes regulating the Tadawul, Saudi Arabia's stock exchange. CMA is the first government authority to receive accreditation in institutional structure maturity from the National Enterprises Architecture (NEA) of the e-Government Program Yesser.

== History ==
Unofficially started in the early fifties and operated under its own rules until the government set its basic regulations in the eighties. The current Capital Market Law is promulgated and pursuant to Royal Decree No. (M/30) dated 2/6/1424H, (16 June 2003) which formally brought it into existence.

== Functions ==
The CMA’s functions are to regulate and develop the Saudi Arabian Capital Market by issuing required rules and regulations for implementing the provisions of Capital Market Law. The basic objectives are to create an appropriate investment environment, boost confidence, and reinforce transparency and disclosure standards in all listed companies, and moreover to protect the investors and dealers from illegal acts in the market.

== Duties ==
The CMA is entrusted with the following duties:

- Regulate and develop the capital market and promote appropriate standards and techniques for all sections and entities involved in Securities Trade Operations.
- Protect investors and the public from unfair and unsound practices involving fraud, deceit, cheating, manipulation, and inside information trading.
- Maintain fairness, efficiency, and transparency in transactions of securities.
- Develop appropriate measures to reduce risks pertaining to transactions of securities.
- Develop, regulate, and monitor the issuance of securities and under-trading transactions.
- Regulate and monitor the activities of entities working under CMA.
- Regulate and monitor full disclosure of information related to securities and issuers.

=== CMA’s Board ===
The CMA is governed by a Board of five (5) full-time Commissioners appointed by the Royal Decree:

- Mr. Mazen Turki Al-Sudairi (Chairman)
- Mr. Youssef Hamad Al-Bilihid, Vice Chairman
- Mr. Khalid Abdulaziz Al-Homoud, Member
- Mr. Abdulaziz Abdulmohsen Binhassan, Member
- Dr. Murya Saad Habbash, Member

=== Stock Exchange ===
The Saudi Capital Market Law provides for the establishment of the “Saudi Stock Exchange” as a Joint Stock Company that operates as the only authorized entity to carry out the trading of securities in the Kingdom of Saudi Arabia .

The exchange operations are currently conducted through Saudi Stock Exchange (Tadawul).

=== Securities Depository Center ===
The Capital Market Law provides for the establishment of the Securities Depository Center solely entrusted to execute the transactions of deposit, transfer, settlement, clearing and registering ownership of securities traded on the Exchange.

The functions of the Securities Depository Center are currently operated by The Saudi Stock Exchange (Tadawul).

== Capital Market Law ==
The Saudi Capital Market Authority was established to achieve a set of objectives, of which the most important are developing an organized, fair, transparent financial market, and ensuring the protection of investors from irregular practices, which involving deceit, cheat, fraudulence, or manipulation. To achieve these objectives and others, the market system has given the Authority financial, regulatory and supervisory frameworks to facilitate the completion of the tasks entrusted to the Authority.

== See also ==
- Economy of Saudi Arabia
- Saudi Arabian Monetary Agency
- Securities Commission
- List of financial supervisory authorities by country
