= Albanian Financial Supervisory Authority =

Albanian regulatory agency

The Albanian Financial Supervisory Authority (AFSA) was set up in 2006 as a public organization. The AFSA is solely responsible for the maintenance and supervision of all major financial activities going on in Albania. The reports from the AFSA are directly submitted to the Albanian Government. The AFSA majorly concerns about the safety and security of the rights of their customers. They also try to bring in reliability, transparency in insurance area, securities and pension funds sector. For all the Interested parties, the AFSA provides high standard of services, expertise and transparency in their work.

All the financial activities in Albania are administered and regulated by the Albanian Financial Supervisory Authority (AFSA). Mark Crawford, Head of the American Chamber of commerce, recently stated in an Interview that the Albanian Securities Exchange (ALSE) will soon make the field better by attracting the foreign investors. He also stated that opening of stock exchange could be the start for the investors. Starting with the Tax relief, some other policies can be developed in accordance to attract the Foreign Investors. The Head also requested the Government of Albania to focus on Such Policies.

In July 2017, the joint stock company ALSE (The Albanian Securities Exchange), the very first private securities exchange was Authorized by the Albanian Financial Supervisory Authority (AFSA) in Albania. In the Starting itself the AFSA made it clear that the ALSE will majorly focus on the Government Securities Trading in the very first Year of establishment. The Founders of the ALSE were the Americans Bank of Investments and Credins Bank with a share of 42.5% each and AK with 15% of investments.

For the development of financial sector in Albania, FSVC (Financial Services Volunteer Corps) got funding from USAID, under the administration of Volunteers for Economic Growth Alliance (VEGA). The Bank of Albania (BoA), the Albanian Financial Supervisory Authority (AFSA) and the Albanian Deposit Insurance Authority (ADIA) get the technical support from FSVC under the Financial Sector Development program (FSDP).

== See also ==
- List of financial supervisory authorities by country
