= List of banks in Equatorial Guinea =

This is a list of commercial banks in Equatorial Guinea, based on acceptance of letters of credit as reported by specialist media Trade Finance Africa.

== List of commercial banks ==
- Commercial Bank Guinée Equatoriale (CBGE), part of Commercial Bank Group
- BGFIBank Equatorial Guinea, part of BGFIBank Group
- Banco Nacional de Guinea Ecuatorial (BANGE)
- CCEI Bank, part of Afriland First Bank Group
- Ecobank Equatorial Guinea, part of Ecobank Group

== See also ==
- Bank of Central African States
- List of banks in Africa
