= Seychelles Financial Services Authority =

Government agency of Seychelles

Financial Services Authority Seychelles
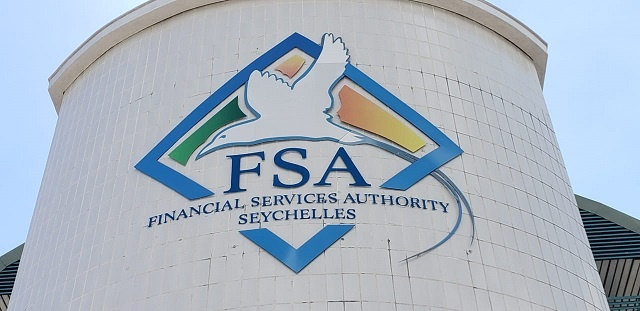
- Seychelles FSA logo on building

Agency overview
- Formed: 2013; 13 years ago
- Agency executive: Randolf Samson, CEO
- Website: www.fsaseychelles.sc

The Financial Services Authority (FSA) is the autonomous regulatory agency responsible for licensing, supervising, and developing the non-bank financial services sector in the Republic of Seychelles. Established by the Financial Services Authority Act 2013 and headquartered in Victoria, the Authority oversees fiduciary and capital-market service providers, gambling activities, the International Trade Zone, and the registries for international business companies, foundations, limited partnerships, and trusts. The FSA also supervises compliance with anti-money laundering and countering the financing of terrorism frameworks.

== History ==
In February 2020, the Seychelles was added to the European Union's list of non-cooperative jurisdictions for tax purposes. It was moved to the "grey list" the following year but blacklisted again in October 2023. In April 2020, the OECD rated Seychelles "partially compliant" in its peer review.

As of November 2021, more than 54,000 international business companies were registered in Seychelles.

In October 2022, Randolph Samson succeeded Damian Thesée as CEO of the FSA.

To address money-laundering concerns, in 2024 authorities introduced the Virtual Asset Service Providers Bill, a legal framework for VASPs such as brokers, wallet service providers, virtual asset exchanges, and investment providers. The FSA was tasked with enforcing these new regulations.

As of 2024, Seychelles hosts numerous retail brokers, such as Trade View, Naga, Zenfinex, Admirals, Moneta Markets, OnEquity, Plus500, and others. Seychelles licenses are often cited as being more cost-effective compared to European equivalents.

== Regulatory environment ==
Seychelles has been described as a gateway for offshore finance. The International Consortium of Investigative Journalists (ICIJ) has reported on the jurisdiction's association with financial scandals and the use of shell companies by international figures to obscure ownership. While an online corporate registry exists, it has historically provided limited information regarding shareholders or directors. Regulations have also permitted the use of nominee directors and shareholders.

=== International scrutiny ===
When the OECD tightened scrutiny of other financial centers in the early 2010s, Seychelles saw an increase in activity from networks linked to Eastern Europe.

In 2010, Kazakh businessman Mukhtar Ablyazov faced prosecution for using Seychellois companies to misappropriate funds from BTA Bank.

In 2011, Note Printing Australia (NPA) and Securency, subsidiaries of the Reserve Bank of Australia, admitted to directing funds through a Seychellois shell company.

In 2012, an illegal online pharmacy operation laundering proceeds through Seychelles led to the conviction of two Israeli businessmen in the United States.

The Panama Papers leak indicated that Seychelles-based Alpha Consulting registered a significant number of shell companies. The FSA revoked Alpha Consulting's license in March 2025.

== See also ==
- List of financial supervisory authorities by country

== Sources ==
- International Monetary Fund. Legal Dept. (2024). "Seychelles: Technical Assistance Report-Bank Resolution Framework". IMF Staff Country Reports. 2024 (054). International Monetary Fund.
