= Financial Services Commission of Belize =

Financial regulator of Belize

Financial Services Commission (FSC)

Agency overview
- Formed: 15 April 2023
- Preceding agency: International Financial Services Commission (IFSC)
- Headquarters: Belize City, Belize
- Agency executives: Joseph Waight, Chairman; Claude B. F. Haylock, Chief executive
- Key document: Financial Services Commission Act No. 8 of 2023
- Website: www.belizefsc.org.bz

The Financial Services Commission (FSC) is the Belize government agency responsible for non-banking financial regulation. It is responsible for regulating all non-banking financial market participants and setting and enforcing of financial regulations. A number of international online forex brokers obtain their international license from FSC.

== History ==
FSC was established in Belize in 2023 as a successor to the International Financial Services Commission (IFSC). The aim of the Commission is licensing of financial companies, as well as controlling and supervision of all regulated firms to bind all financial services requirements to their activity. FSC is regulated by the Ministry of Finance and the Financial Services Commission Act. FSC has to follow the Financial Services Practitioners Code of Conduct and Best Practices, which aims to increase its level of services.

FSC became associate member of the International Organization of Securities Commissions in 2024 and achieved ordinary membership in 2026.

== Responsibilities ==
The Financial Services Commission of Belize has the following responsibilities:

- To promote Belize as a financial services center, including protecting its reputation as such.
- To supervise and regulate non-banking financial services.
- To advice Belize government on financial sector policies.
- To aggregate and distribute information on changes in regulated services.
- To help capital formation and economic growth.
- To protect investors from fraudulent activities.
- To promote efficient capital markets.
- To reduce systemic financial risks.
- To improve the public's understanding of the financial system and associated risks.
- To facilitate company creation and business registration process.

== Regulated entities ==
Many international foreign exchange brokers with legal registration in the offshore jurisdiction of Belize are regulated and supervised by the Financial Services Commission.

== See also ==
- Central Bank of Belize
- Securities Commission
- Caribbean Financial Action Task Force
- List of financial supervisory authorities by country
