= Banking Commission of the West African Monetary Union =

African supranational banking supervisor

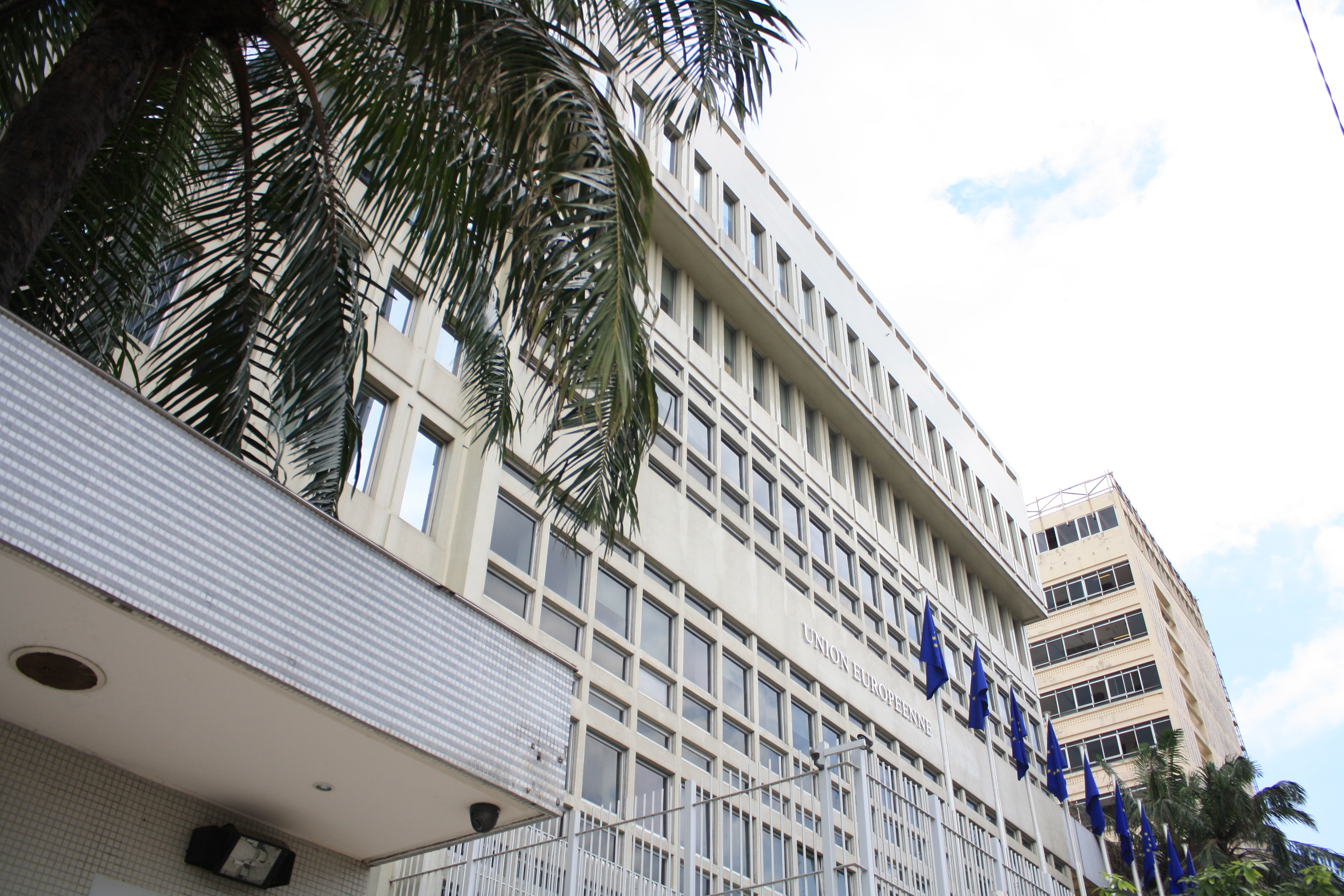
Former building of the CB-UMOA general secretariat in Abidjan, later repurposed as representation of the European Union

The Banking Commission of the West African Monetary Union (French: Commission Bancaire de l'Union Monétaire Ouest Africaine, CB-UMOA) is a supranational bank supervisor established in 1990 and based in Abidjan, Ivory Coast. It is institutionally part of the Central Bank of West African States (French acronym BCEAO) and is the single banking supervisor for the eight countries of the West African Monetary Union (UMOA), namely Benin, Burkina Faso, Guinea Bissau, Ivory Coast, Mali, Niger, Senegal, and Togo.

== Overview ==
In 1989, BCEAO Governor Alassane Ouattara promoted the creation of a single banking supervisory authority for the entire West African Monetary Union, in a context of banking sector fragility in West Africa and widespread supervisory failure by the then-existing national banking commissions of the individual UMOA member states.

The Banking Commission was established by an international convention signed by the participating governments in Ouagadougou on 24 April 1990, complemented by a bilateral agreement between the BCEAO and Ivory Coast on 16 October 1990 to establish the Commission in Abidjan with appropriate privileges and immunities. The area remains far from a full banking union, however, since the financial burden of bank crisis management and resolution has remained at the national level. The Banking Commission's scope of authority, moreover, only covers the larger and/or cross-border banks, whether smaller local banks remain supervised by national authorities.

The governor of the BCEAO acts as chairman (French: Président) of the CB-UMOA, whose operations are led by a secretary-general (French: Secrétaire général) based in Abidjan.

== Leadership ==
The following individuals have held the position of Secretary-General of the CB-UMOA since its establishment:

- Djibril Sakho, October 1990 - October 1993
- Marcel Kodjo, October 1993 - September 1998
- Emmanuel Nana, September 1998 - February 2003
- Mamadou Diop, February 2003 - January 2007
- Eric Ekue, January 2007 - January 2009
- Charles Luanga Ki-Zerbo, January 2009 - January 2012
- Sanou Bolo, January 2012 - December 2014
- Sena Elda Kpotsra, January 2015 - December 2019
- Antoine Traore, since December 2019

== Supervised entities by country ==
- List of banks in Benin
- List of banks in Burkina Faso
- List of banks in Guinea-Bissau
- List of banks in Ivory Coast
- List of banks in Mali
- List of banks in Niger
- List of banks in Senegal
- List of banks in Togo

== See also ==
- Central African Banking Commission (COBAC)
- Financial Markets Authority of the West African Monetary Union (AMF-UMOA)
- Regional Insurance Control Commission (CRCA)
- Eastern Caribbean Central Bank (ECCB)
- European Banking Supervision
- List of financial supervisory authorities by country
