= International Forum of Independent Audit Regulators =

- Formation: September 2006
- Type: International organization
- Legal status: General Incorporated Association
- Headquarters: Tokyo, Japan
- Members: 56 jurisdictions
- Chair: Takashi Nagaoka (Secretary General of Certified Public Accountants and Auditing Oversight Board (CPAAOB) and Deputy Commissioner for International Affairs at Japan's Financial Services Agency (JFSA))
- Vice Chair: Kevin Prendergast (Chief Executive of the Irish Auditing & Accounting Supervisory Authority (IAASA))
- Website: https://www.ifiar.org/

The International Forum of Independent Audit Regulators (IFIAR) is a global member organization comprising independent audit regulators from 56 jurisdictions.

IFIAR was established in Paris in 2006. Its members are audit regulators and supervisors from the continents of Africa, Asia, Europe, North and South America and Oceania.

== Activities ==
IFIAR holds a Plenary meeting annually to discuss broad issues related to audit quality matters.

There are five formal Working Groups that meet regularly throughout the year and submit their deliverables to the Plenary meeting:

1. Enforcement Working Group: chaired by Elizabeth Barrett, FRC, United Kingdom
2. Global Audit Quality Working Group: chaired by Kara Stein, PCAOB, United States
3. Investor and Other Stakeholder Working Group: chaired by Peter Hofbauer, APAB, Austria
4. Inspection Workshops Working Group: chaired by Askin Akbulut, AOB, Germany
5. Standards Coordination Working Group: chaired by James Ferris, FRC, United Kingdom

== Inspection Findings Survey ==
Since 2012, IFIAR conducts Annual Inspection Findings Survey and publishes its report. These reports show general trends of audit inspection findings.

== Membership ==
As of September 2024, IFIAR has 56 members. IFIAR members are divided into two categories:

- Members
- Associate members

== Multilateral Memorandum of Understanding ==
IFIAR Members approved the MMOU concerning co-operation in the exchange of information for audit oversight on June 30, 2015. Currently, 22 members signed the MMOU.

== IFIAR Board ==
The IFIAR Board was established in April 2017. Current Board Members are Australia, Brazil, Canada, Chinese Taipei, France, Germany, Greece, Ireland, Japan, the Netherlands, Singapore, South Africa, Switzerland, Turkey, the United Kingdom and the United States. As of April 2022
