= West African Economic and Monetary Union =

Monetary union in Africa

UEMOA WAMZ ECOWAS only (Cape Verde)

The West African Economic and Monetary Union, generally referred in English to by its French acronym UEMOA (for Union économique et monétaire ouest-africaine) and alternatively as WAEMU, is a treaty-based arrangement binding together eight West African states, seven of which were previously colonies of French West Africa. It was established to promote monetary and financial stability as well as economic integration among countries that share the West African CFA franc (ISO 4217: XOF) as a common currency. From 1962 to 1994, it was known as the West African Monetary Union (WAMU or, in French, UMOA for Union monétaire ouest-africaine).

Territorially, UEMOA mostly overlaps with the larger regional organization, the Economic Community of West African States (ECOWAS).

UEMOA common institutions include its Council of Heads of State (French: Conférence des chefs d'État et de gouvernement) and Council of Ministers; Commission, Court of Justice, and Court of Accounts (all in Ouagadougou); the Central Bank of West African States (BCEAO) in Dakar; the Banking Commission of the West African Monetary Union (CB-UMOA) and Financial Markets Authority of the West African Monetary Union (AMF-UMOA), both in Abidjan; and the West African Development Bank (BOAD) in Lomé. UEMOA countries also share the Regional Insurance Control Commission (CRCA, in Libreville) with other African countries of the Franc Zone.

== History ==
=== Background ===
In late 1944, newly liberated France decided to devalue its currency, the French franc, but to leave unchanged the monetary parity in its overseas colonies that had not been affected by similar economic distress. It thus established the CFA franc (for Colonies Françaises d'Afrique) for colonies in Africa, and the CFP franc (Colonies Françaises du Pacifique) for those in the Pacific Ocean, whereas Caribbean colonies retained use of the French franc and Indochina used a separate pegged currency, the French Indochinese piastre.

In West Africa, the CFA franc was issued by the Banque de l'Afrique Occidentale (BAO) under an issuance privilege granted by French national legislation. In 1955, the BAO was replaced in that role by the public-sector Institut d'Émission de l'Afrique Occidentale Française et du Togo, which in turn was renamed the BCEAO in 1959.

=== West African Monetary Union ===
The West African Monetary Union was established in 1962 by treaty between France and the newly independent countries. The 1962 treaty established an operations account (French: compte d'opérations) at the French Treasury, in which the participating African countries committed to pool their external reserves and which also functioned as an overdraft facility. In exchange, France extended a guarantee ensuring the unlimited convertibility of the CFA franc into French franc, at a fixed exchange rate of 50 CFA francs to one French franc (unchanged since a French franc devaluation in October 1948, notwithstanding the redenomination of 100 old French francs to one new French franc in 1960).

In 1973, the framework was reformed with a treaty revision and new monetary cooperation agreement that stipulated the BCEAO's relocation from Paris to Dakar. The transfer was completed in mid-1978 and the new building inaugurated in May 1979.

=== West African Economic and Monetary Union ===
UEMOA was created by a Treaty signed at Dakar, Senegal, on 10 January 1994, by the heads of state and governments of Benin, Burkina Faso, Ivory Coast, Mali, Niger, Senegal, and Togo.

On 2 May 1997, Guinea-Bissau, a former Portuguese colony, became the organisation's eighth (and only non-francophone) member state.

On 29 December 2019, a revision of the monetary cooperation agreement with France led to the termination of the operations account mechanism in January 2020, whereas France maintained its unlimited guarantee of convertibility into euros.

UEMOA has 32 international operating accounts, spread across ten countries and eight different currencies, including one at the United States Federal Reserve.

=== Relations with the Alliance of Sahel States ===
Officially united in another confederation (Alliance of Sahel States) without a monetary area, these three countries have not shown their intention to break ties with UEMOA. Leaving UEMOA is therefore a much more complex decision. The member countries of the union share a single currency, the CFA franc, which is based on a convertibility guarantee by the French Treasury. If a country leaves UEMOA, it will have to recover its foreign exchange reserves, currently divided between the UEMOA Central Bank in Abidjan (50%) and the French Treasury (50%).

== Overview ==
UEMOA is a customs union and currency union between its members. Its objectives include:

- Greater economic competitiveness, through open markets, in addition to the rationalisation and harmonisation of the legal environment
- The convergence of macro-economic policies and indicators
- The creation of a common market
- The co-ordination of sectoral policies
- The harmonisation of fiscal policies

Among its achievements, the UEMOA has successfully implemented macro-economic convergence criteria and an effective surveillance mechanism. It has adopted a customs union and common external tariff and has combined indirect taxation regulations, in addition to initiating regional structural and sectoral policies. A September 2002 IMF survey cited the UEMOA as "the furthest along the path toward integration" of all the regional groupings in Africa.

However, within the region, there has been a low level of integration with an increase in income disparities since the creation of UEMOA. Côte d'Ivoire had the highest GDP per capita in 2022 at US$1,950 while Niger had the lowest one at US$484. In the same year, Côte d'Ivoire and Senegal alone accounted for more than 60% of the unions' exports. Additionally, there is a large discrepancy in countries' economic performance over the 2010 decade; the best performance was recorded by Côte d'Ivoire (annual growth rate of 6.72%) and the lowest one by Guinea Bissau (3.85%). However, positive progress has been made in economic distribution since the foundation of UEMOA, with the mean dispersion of economic growth in the region being 1.26 before the creation and 0.73 after.

== Interaction with ECOWAS ==
The Economic Community of West African States (ECOWAS) and UEMOA have developed a common plan of action on trade liberalisation and macroeconomic policy convergence. The organizations have also agreed on common rules of origin to enhance trade, and ECOWAS has agreed to adopt UEMOA's customs declaration forms and compensation mechanisms.

== Membership ==
- Benin (Founding Member)
- Burkina Faso (Founding Member) (Note: Withdrew from ECOWAS, but remains a member of UEMOA.)
- Guinea-Bissau (Joined on 2 May 1997)
- Ivory Coast (Founding Member)
- Mali (Founding Member)
- Niger (Founding Member)
- Senegal (Founding Member)
- Togo (Founding Member)

== See also ==
- Economic and Monetary Community of Central Africa
- Eastern Caribbean Currency Union
- Economic and Monetary Union of the European Union
- UEMOA Tournament

== Sources ==
- Byiers, Bruce; Dièye, Cheikh Tidiane (2022). "Regional integration in West Africa: Wasteful overlaps or necessary options?". ECDPM.
