= Capital Market Authority (Oman) =

The Capital Market Authority (Arabic: هيئة السوق المالية) is the Oman governments financial regulatory authority responsible for capital markets in Oman. The CMA is responsible for regulating the financial service industry of Oman. The CMA was established on January 9, 1999. Its responsibilities include setting and policing financial rules and regulations and developing the capital markets, this includes regulating the Muscat Securities Market.

== See also ==
- Muscat Securities Market
- List of financial supervisory authorities by country
