= List of banks in Chad =

This is a list of commercial banks in Chad, based on SWIFT codes.

== List of commercial banks ==
- Société Générale des Banques (SGB, former Banque Tchadienne de Crédit et Dépôts - BTCD), part of Coris Bank Group since early 2024
- Banque Commerciale du Chari (BCC), state-controlled
- Ecobank Tchad, part of Ecobank Group
- Orabank (former Financial Bank Tchad), part of Orabank Group
- Commercial Bank Tchad (CBT, former Banque de Développement du Tchad - BDT), part of Commercial Bank Group
- Banque Agricole et Commerciale (BAC), state-controlled
- Banque Sahélo-Saharienne pour l'Investissement et le Commerce (Tchad) S.A., part of BSIC Group
- United Bank for Africa (UBA) Tchad, part of UBA Group
- Banque de l'Habitat du Tchad (BHT), state-controlled

== See also ==
- Bank of Central African States
- List of banks in Africa
