= Central African Financial Market Supervisory Commission =

African supranational securities authority

The Central African Financial Market Supervisory Commission (French: Commission de Surveillance du Marché Financier de l’Afrique Centrale, COSUMAF) is a supranational markets regulator established in 2019 and based in Libreville, Gabon. It is the single securities authority for the six countries of the Economic and Monetary Community of Central Africa (French acronym CEMAC), namely Cameroon, the Central African Republic, Chad, Equatorial Guinea, Gabon, and the Republic of the Congo.

== Overview ==
The COSUMAF results from the merger of the national securities commissions of the six CEMAC member states in March 2019. As part of the same reform package enacted in 2018, the Central African Securities Exchange (French: Bourse des valeurs mobilières de l'Afrique centrale, BVMAC) absorbed the Douala Stock Exchange and relocated from Libreville to Douala, and the Bank of Central African States was designated as the regional central securities depository.

The COSUMAF's head office in Libreville was inaugurated on 30 March 2023.

== Leadership ==
- Nagoum Yamassoum, Chair (French: Président) 2019-2023
- Jacqueline Adiaba, Chair 2023-

== See also ==
- Financial Markets Authority of the West African Monetary Union (AMF-UMOA)
- European Securities and Markets Authority (ESMA)
- Regional Insurance Control Commission (CRCA)
- List of financial supervisory authorities by country
