= Anguilla Financial Services Commission =

Organization based in Anguilla

Anguillan Financial Services Commission
Agency overview
- Formed: 2 February 2004
- Jurisdiction: Anguilla
- Headquarters: The Valley, Anguilla
- Agency executives: Helen Hatton, Chairman; Gerry Halischuk, Director
- Website: www.fsc.org.ai

The Anguillan Financial Services Commission is an autonomous regulatory authority responsible for the regulation, supervision and inspection of all financial services in and from within Anguilla, including insurance, banking, trustee business, company management, mutual funds business as well as the registration of companies, limited partnerships, intellectual property and ships.

The commission was established by the enactment of the Financial Services Commission Act on 26 November 2003 and it commenced operations on 2 February 2004.

The commission now oversees all regulatory responsibilities previously handled by the government through the Financial Services Department. The commission was established in 2001 pursuant to the Financial Services Commission Act (Cap F.28) to try to protect the independence of the regulation of financial services. The establishment of the commission was also part of certain international commitments by Anguilla to play its part in the fight against cross border white collar crime while safeguarding the privacy and confidentiality of legitimate business transactions.

The commission has also been tasked with new responsibilities including promoting public understanding of the financial system and its products, policing the perimeter of regulated activity, reducing financial crime and preventing market abuse.

The Chair of the Financial Services Commission is Helen Hatton. Mrs Hatton was a former financial regulator in Jersey, and is Fellow of the Institute of Advanced Legal Studies and a Freeman of the Worshipful Company of International Bankers.

== See also ==
- List of company registers
- List of financial supervisory authorities by country
