= Office of the Superintendent of Financial Institutions =

Canadian regulatory agency

- Bureau du surintendant des institutions financières

Agency overview
- Formed: July 2, 1987
- Preceding agencies: Department of Insurance; Office of the Inspector General of Banks
- Minister responsible: François-Philippe Champagne, Minister of Finance
- Agency executive: Peter Routledge, Superintendent
- Key document: Office of the Superintendent of Financial Institutions Act
- Website: www.osfi-bsif.gc.ca

The Office of the Superintendent of Financial Institutions (OSFI; French: Bureau du surintendant des institutions financières, BSIF) is an independent agency of the Government of Canada reporting to the Minister of Finance created "to contribute to public confidence in the Canadian financial system". It is the sole regulator of banks, and the primary regulator of insurance companies, trust companies, loan companies and pension plans in Canada.

The current Superintendent is Peter Routledge, who was appointed in June 2021. He replaced Jeremy Rudin, who retired. The term of the appointment is seven years.

== Mandate ==
OSFI's mandate is to protect depositors, policyholders, financial institution creditors and pension plan members, while allowing financial institutions to compete and take reasonable risks. The Office of the Chief Actuary, an independent unit operating within OSFI, provides a range of actuarial valuation and advisory services to the Government of Canada.

== Tools ==
The OSFI sets the Domestic Stability Buffer (DSB), a capital buffer that mandates a portion of the percentage of loans that Canada's six largest banks must keep in reserve in case of adverse circumstances such as a financial downturn where some borrowers may be unable to keep making payments on their loans.

== Related legislation ==
- Office of the Superintendent of Financial Institutions Act
- Bank Act
- Trust and Loan Companies Act
- Cooperative Credit Associations Act
- Insurance Companies Act
- Pension Benefits Standards Act, 1985 (PBSA)

== History ==
Late 1800s – establishment of the Office of the Superintendent of Insurance (OSI), which subsequently became the Department of Insurance (DOI). The DOI was responsible for overseeing federally licensed life insurance companies, property and casualty insurance companies, trust and loan companies and pension plans, and for providing actuarial services to the government.

1925 – the Office of the Inspector General of Banks was established in response to the Home Bank failure and was responsible for regulating Canada's chartered banks.

Early 1930s – Royal Commission on Banking and Currency reviewed banking and currency issues in the Canadian financial system.

Early 1960s – Porter Royal Commission reviewed structural and operational issues affecting the financial system and financial institutions in Canada. The commission's report concluded the financial system was sound, but developments had moved beyond the current state of laws and regulatory practices. Porter argued the public could not be insulated from loss in dealing with public institutions and markets. The Commission called for a system that would provide for adequate disclosure and that would set high standards of self-regulation, backed by strong government supervision and powers to enforce proper practices.

1967 – the Minister of Finance introduced legislation to establish the Canada Deposit Insurance Corporation (CDIC) to ensure the safety of small deposits and bring about a gradual improvement in the minimum financial standard of deposit-taking institutions in Canada. In 1983, legislative amendments extended CDIC's mandate to include assisting to maintain public confidence and stability in the financial system.

Mid-1980s – increased international competition and the failure of two Canadian banks and the subsequent enquiry into these failures by the Honourable Willard Z. Estey highlighted the need to ensure a sound approach to handling the risks associated with the financial marketplace.

July 1987 – to ensure a coordinated approach to supervision and a modern regulatory framework for Canada's financial system, and acting on the recommendations of the Estey commission, the government proclaimed the Financial Institutions and Deposit Insurance Amendment Act and the Office of the Superintendent of Financial Institutions Act. This latter Act joined the Department of Insurance and the Office of the Inspector General of Banks to form OSFI, which was given the powers to supervise and regulate all federally regulated financial institutions.

May 1996 – Bill C-15 receives Royal Assent. This new legislation clarifies OSFI's prime responsibilities as helping to minimize losses to depositors, policy holders, and pension plan members and to maintain public confidence in the Canadian financial system. Preventing failure of financial institutions is not part of OSFI's mandate; however, promoting sound business practices helps reduce the risk that financial institutions will fail. The mandate stresses the importance of early intervention to achieve OSFI's objectives and establishes the basis for OSFI's mission, objectives, priorities and strategies.

== See also ==
- Banking in Canada
- Canadian securities regulation
- Other federal agencies which regulate banking
  - Canada Deposit Insurance Corporation
  - Financial Consumer Agency of Canada
- List of financial supervisory authorities by country
