= CEMAC =

Monetary union in Africa

The Economic and Monetary Community of Central Africa, generally referred to by its French acronym CEMAC (for Communauté économique et monétaire de l'Afrique centrale; Spanish: Comunidad Económica y Monetaria de África Central), is an organization of states of Central Africa established by Cameroon, Central African Republic, Chad, the Republic of the Congo, Equatorial Guinea and Gabon to promote economic integration among countries that share a common currency, the Central African CFA franc.

Usage of: West African CFA franc Central African CFA franc: CEMAC countries

There is a strong overlap between CEMAC and Economic Community of Central African States (ECMAS) in the areas of membership and mandates.

CEMAC's common institutions include its Council of Heads of State (French: Conférence des chefs d'État) and Council of Ministers; a Commission in Bangui, Court of Justice in N'Djamena, and Parliament in Malabo; the Bank of Central African States (BEAC) in Yaoundé; the Central African Banking Commission (COBAC) and Central African Financial Market Supervisory Commission (COSUMAF), both in Libreville; and the Development Bank of the Central African States (BDEAC) in Brazzaville. CEMAC countries also share the Regional Insurance Control Commission (CRCA, in Libreville) with other African countries of the Franc Zone.

== History ==
=== Background ===
In late 1945, newly liberated France decided to devalue its currency, the French franc, but to leave unchanged the monetary parity in its overseas colonies that had not been affected by similar economic distress. It thus established the CFA franc (for Colonies Françaises d'Afrique) for colonies in Africa, and the CFP franc (Colonies Françaises du Pacifique) for those in the Pacific Ocean, whereas Caribbean colonies retained use of the French franc and Indochina used a separate pegged currency, the French Indochinese piastre.

In Central Africa, the CFA franc had been issued since its creation by the Caisse Centrale de la France d'Outre-Mer (CCFOM) under an issuance privilege granted by French national legislation. In 1955, the CCFOM was replaced in that role by a new affiliate, the Institut d'Émission de l'Afrique Équatoriale Française et du Cameroun, which in turn was renamed the Banque Centrale des États de l'Afrique Équatoriale et du Cameroun (BCEAEC) in 1959.

=== UDEAC ===
In late 1964, the five newly independent countries (the four of the former French Equatorial Africa, namely the CAR, Chad, Gabon and the Republic of the Congo, plus Cameroon) established the Customs and Economic Union of Central Africa, known as UDEAC (Union douanière et économique de l'Afrique centrale), by treaty signed in Brazzaville. The Brazzaville Treaty envisioned a customs union with free trade between members and a common external tariff for imports from other countries. It became effective in 1966 after it was ratified by the then five member countries.

=== Central African Monetary Area ===
In 1972, the framework was reformed with a treaty revision and new monetary cooperation agreement that resulted in the BCEAEC's renaming as BEAC and its relocation from Paris to Yaoundé. The transfer was completed in early 1977. Equatorial Guinea joined the Union on 19 December 1983.

=== CEMAC Treaty (1994) and aftermath ===
In 1994, UDEAC signed the Treaty of N'Djamena for the establishment of CEMAC to promote the entire process of sub-regional integration through the forming of monetary union with the Central Africa CFA franc as a common currency. As a consequence CEMAC officially superseded UDEAC in June 1999, operating both a customs union and monetary union.

In June 2008, the participating countries signed a new agreement on the Central African Monetary Union (Union monétaire de l'Afrique centrale).

On December 16, 2024, the CEMAC heads of state were planning to convene a summit with an IMF delegation present, to discuss the possibility of devaluing the CFA Franc, so that financing from the International Monetary Fund (IMF) can restart.

== Overview ==
CEMAC's objectives are the promotion of trade, the institution of a genuine common market, and greater solidarity among peoples and towards under-privileged countries and regions. In 1994, it succeeded in introducing quota restrictions and reductions in the range and amount of tariffs. Currently, CEMAC countries share a common financial, regulatory, and legal structure, and maintain a common external tariff on imports from non-CEMAC countries. In theory, tariffs have been eliminated on trade within CEMAC, but full implementation of this has been delayed. Movement of capital within CEMAC is free.

The CEMAC's financial stability was threatened by the fall in the price of petroleum starting in 2014, as all members except CAR depend heavily on oil revenue. International reserves dropped, and there was discussion of a devaluation of the CFA Franc. Ultimately, the conference of heads of state in 2016 adopted a detailed reform program, the PREF-CEMAC, to stabilize the situation.

== Membership ==
- Cameroon
- Central African Republic
- Chad
- Equatorial Guinea
- Gabon
- Republic of the Congo

== See also ==
- West African Economic and Monetary Union
- Eastern Caribbean Currency Union
- Economic and Monetary Union of the European Union
- CEMAC Cup

== Sources ==
- Byiers, Bruce (2017-12-04). "ECCAS and CEMAC: Struggling to integrate in an intertwined region". ECDPM.
