= Regional Insurance Control Commission =

Supranational African insurance supervisor

The Regional Insurance Control Commission (French: Commission Régionale de Contrôle des Assurances, CRCA) is a supranational insurance supervisor established in 1993 and based in Libreville, Gabon. It is the single authority for insurers in the eight countries of the West African Monetary Union (French acronym UMOA), the six countries of the Economic and Monetary Community of Central Africa (CEMAC), as well as the Comoros, thus covering 15 countries in total: Benin, Burkina Faso, Cameroon, Central African Republic, Chad, Comoros, Equatorial Guinea, Gabon, Guinea Bissau, Ivory Coast, Mali, Niger, Republic of the Congo, Senegal, and Togo.

== Overview ==
The CRCA is the regulatory and supervisory arm of the Inter-African Conference on Insurance Markets (French: Conférence Interafricaine des Marchés d'Assurances, CIMA), a regional body that seeks to promote insurance market development. The statute of the CRCA was signed in Abidjan in September 1993, and it started operations in August 1995. The members of the Commission include representatives of the ministry of charge of the insurance sector in six of the participating countries.

== Leadership ==
- Ahmadou Kourouma, Chairman 1995-1997
- Frédéric Dabira Nikienta, Chairman 2002-2008
- Demba Samba Diallo, Chairman 2008-2014
- Bédi Gnagne, Chairman 2014-2020
- Mamadou Sy, Chairman 2020-2023

== See also ==
- Banking Commission of the West African Monetary Union (CB-UMOA)
- Central African Banking Commission (COBAC)
- Financial Markets Authority of the West African Monetary Union (AMF-UMOA)
- Central African Financial Market Supervisory Commission (COSUMAF)
- European Insurance and Occupational Pensions Authority (EIOPA)
- List of financial supervisory authorities by country
