= Financial Regulatory Commission of Mongolia =

Financial regulatory authority of Mongolia

- Санхүүгийн Зохицуулах Хороо
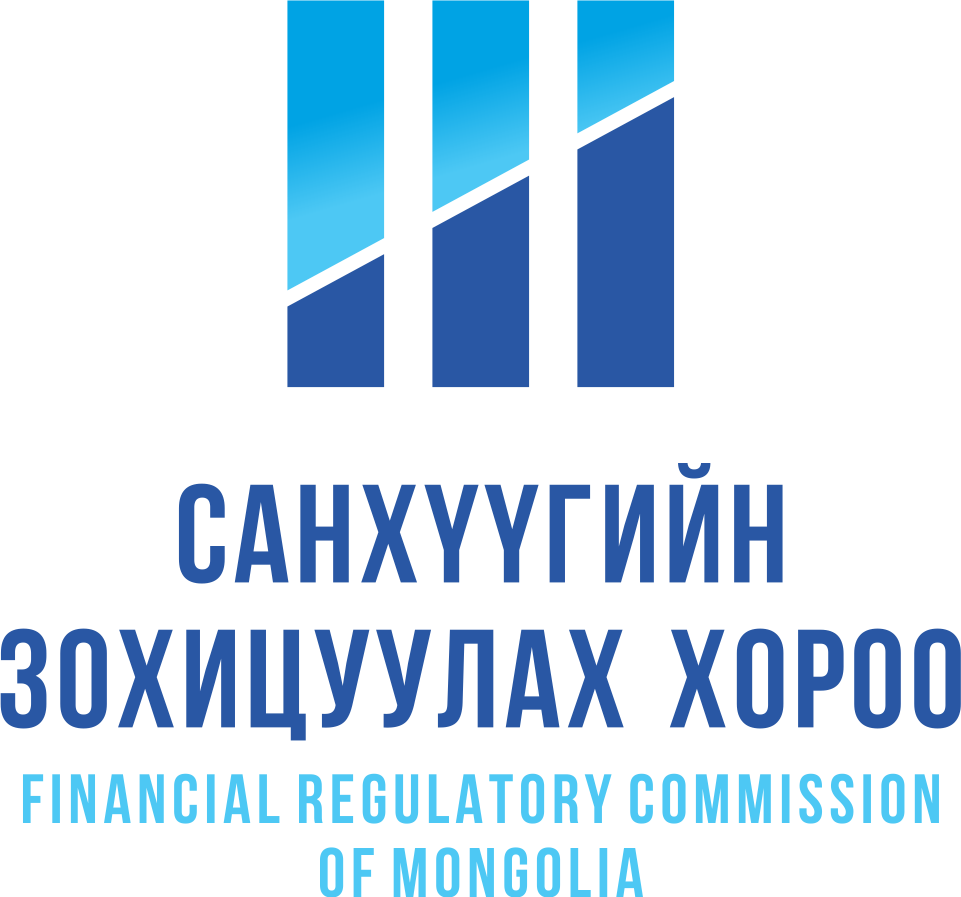

Agency overview
- Formed: 25 January 2006
- Preceding agency: Securities Commission
- Headquarters: Ulaanbaatar, Mongolia; 47°55′06.7″N 106°54′44.7″E
- Website: Official website

The Financial Regulatory Commission of Mongolia (FRC; Санхүүгийн Зохицуулах Хороо) is a government agency of Mongolia responsible for the supervision of non-banking financial institutions in the country.

== History ==
FRC was originally established as Securities Commission on 18 November 1994. In 2005, the State Great Khural approved the Law on the Legal Status of the Financial Regulatory Commission and in 2006, it approved the Ordinance of the Finance Regulatory Commission. The FRC was then established on 25 January 2006 as an agency responsible for the supervision of non-banking financial institutions in the country. In June 2010, FRC joined the Alliance for Financial Inclusion.

== See also ==
- Ministry of Finance (Mongolia)
