= St. Vincent and the Grenadines Financial Services Authority =

Financial non-banking regulator of St. Vincent and the Grenadines

Financial Services Authority
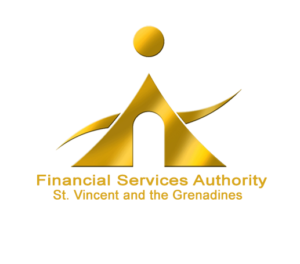

Agency overview
- Formed: 12 November 2012; 13 years ago
- Preceding agencies: International Financial Services Authority (IFSA); Co-operatives Division of the Ministry of National Mobilization and Social Development; Supervisory and Regulatory Division within the Ministry of Finance
- Jurisdiction: Saint Vincent and the Grenadines
- Headquarters: 2nd Floor, Inland Revenue Building, Grenville Street, P.O. Box 356, Kingstown
- Agency executives: Carla James, Executive director; Kenneth Young, Chairmain
- Key document: Financial Services Authority Act, No. 33 of 2011
- Website: fsasvg.com

The St. Vincent and the Grenadines Financial Services Authority (FSA SVG) is the financial regulatory authority of Saint Vincent and the Grenadines. The FSA regulates international (offshore) financial and non-bank financial sectors in the country.

It was created on November 12, 2012, by the Financial Services Authority Act, No. 33 of 2011, which merged the powers of the International Financial Services Authority, the Co-operatives Division of the Ministry of National Mobilization, Social Development, and the Supervisory, and the Regulatory Division within the Ministry of Finance in a single regulatory body.

== History ==
In 2003, the parliament of the Saint Vincent and the Grenadines enacted the SVG Offshore Finance Authority (Renaming) Act, No. 28 of 2003, establishing the International Financial Services Authority (IFSA), which regulated the international financial services sector.

The St. Vincent and the Grenadines Financial Services Authority was established on November 12, 2012, as a successor to three existing entities: IFSA, the Co-operatives Division of the Ministry of National Mobilization and Social Development, and the Supervisory and Regulatory Division within the Ministry of Finance. This was the result of the Financial Services Authority (FSA) Act enacted on November 22, 2011.

Following the run on deposits of the Saint Vincent Building and Loan Association (BLA) in January 2013, the FSA intervened successfully, preventing a major financial crisis in the country.

== Powers ==
The FSA is responsible for licensing and regulation of international insurance companies, managers and brokers, non-bank financial sector, international financial service providers, international banks, international insurance companies, mutual funds, building societies, credit unions, friendly societies, money services businesses, and virtual asset businesses.

To reach its goals, the FSA makes sure that each regulated financial entity is properly managed and financially stable. It is responsible before the government of Saint Vincent and the Grenadines for ensuring compliance in the non-banking financial sector according to the governing legislative acts.

== Criticism ==
In 2025, the FSA was criticized by the press for failure to act promptly against financial fraud.
