= Securities commission =

Government regulatory body

A securities commission, securities regulator or capital market authority is a government department or agency responsible for financial regulation of securities products within a particular country. Its powers and responsibilities vary greatly from country to country, but generally cover the setting of rules as well as enforcing them for financial intermediaries and stock exchanges.

== History ==
As long as there have been securities there have been regulations. However, in the early days this consisted primarily of self-regulated groups or societies. External government regulation has primarily been driven by financial crises or scandals.

As early as the 13th century the king Edward I of England decreed that brokers should be licensed after he was forced to go to local money brokers that give much less favorable terms then his Italian brokers after the start of the Anglo-French war.

In 1720 the British Parliament passed the Bubble Act which had specific regulations for securities. However the motive of this act was more to support the ‘South Sea bubble’ than protect consumers. However this was the first time that prospectuses and disclosure in the modern sense were used. There was widespread distrust of brokers as the scams collapsed.

In the United States, although Massachusetts required the registration of railroad securities as early as 1852, and other states passed laws relating to securities in the late 19th and early 20th centuries, the real push for securities regulation came from the Midwestern and far western states. After common feeling that investors in these areas of the country were being victimized by capitalists in the east.

However it was the failure of the Blue sky law and the 1930 financial crisis and Great Depression that led the United States government to pass legislation in 1934 to strengthen securities law and for the first time create a separate agency the Securities and Exchange Commission.

In the early 1980s as many countries deregulated their financial markets, they created specific government agencies to police the securities markets and stock exchanges so as to separate regulation from operation of financial markets. Some countries like the UK, created one large agency that covered all financial products. However, some countries use a different model where there are separate agencies for different financial products. Typically, securities, banking and insurance are split, but there may also be separate agencies for futures, options and commodities.

The advent of derivatives and new financial products can obfuscate who has jurisdiction and what their responsibilities are. Some financial companies have used to their advantage to skirt existing regulation.

The 2008 financial crisis led to criticism of the securities regulators for failing to stop abuses of markets and their slowness in responding to the crisis and having suffered regulatory capture.

== Structure ==
Most securities commissions are semi-independent government organisations that have a board of commissioners, usually appointed by the government of the country. They are often fully or partially funded by the organisations that are regulated through charges such as registration and licensing fees.

=== Naming ===
There is no common name for securities commission or financial regulatory agency in each country. Naming has become more complicated as some governments have consolidated or merged organisations and given them a wider remit. They sometimes contain the term securities and commission. Such as the Securities and Exchange Commission of the US or Securities and Futures Commission of Hong Kong. A number also have names based on Financial Authority, such as the Financial Conduct Authority of the UK or Financial Supervisory Authority (Sweden) or variations such as the Financial Services Agency (Japan).

=== Common features ===
Most securities commissions have a mandate to protect consumers, make sure there is an orderly and stable financial market and that brokers and participants behave fairly with clients and each other. Often local stock exchanges as well as brokers are covered by the commission.

=== International cooperation ===
Most financial regulators are members of the International Organization of Securities Commissions (IOSCO), an organisation that helps securities commissions cooperate. The main way that securities commission cooperate is through the IOSCO Memorandum of Understanding, or through bilateral agreements between securities commissions.

Within the European Union there is the European Securities and Markets Authority (ESMA) which is advisory body for the European Commission which attempts to coordinate rules between EU securities commissions.

== See also ==
- Financial regulation
- Central Bank
- Bank regulation
- List of financial supervisory authorities by country
- Securities market participants (United States)
