= E6 =

E6, E06, E.VI or E-6 may refer to:

== Science and technology ==
- E6 series (number series), of preferred numbers for electronic components
- E_{6} (mathematics), an exceptional Lie group, or its Lie algebra $\mathfrak e_6$
- E_{6} polytope, in geometry
- Thyroiditis (ICD-10 code: E06)
- E-6 process, a common photographic process for developing transparency film
- E6 protein, a protein encoded by Human papillomavirus
- Honda E6, one of the predecessors of Honda's ASIMO robot
- Motorola ROKR E6, a 2006 multimedia phone model
- Nokia E6, a smartphone

== Transport ==
=== Rail ===
- EMD E6, a diesel locomotive
- LNER Class E6, a class of British steam locomotives
- PRR E6, an American steam locomotive
- LB&SCR E6 class, a British steam locomotive
- E6 Series Shinkansen, a Japanese high-speed train

=== Road ===
- European route E6, a European highway route
- London Buses route E6, a Transport for London contracted bus route
- North–South Expressway Central Link, route E6 in Malaysia
- NAIA Expressway, route E6 in the Philippines
- Jōban Expressway, Sendai-Tōbu Road, Sanriku Expressway (between Sendaiko-kita IC and Rifu JCT) and Sendai-Hokubu Road, the E6 expressway in Japan
- BYD e6, an electric car by BYD Auto

=== Aviation ===
- Eurowings Europe (IATA code: E6), a Maltese airline subsidiary of Lufthansa
- E-6 Mercury, a US Navy derivative of the Boeing 707
- Eggenfellner E6, an American aircraft engine design
- Pfalz E.VI, a World War I German aircraft

=== Other transport ===
- E6 European long distance path, a long-distance hiking trail

== Music ==
- Electric Six, a Detroit rock band
- E6, the first note of the whistle register
- "E6", a song by Norwegian band D.D.E. The song title is a reference to the European route E6.
- Elephant 6, a collective of independent American musicians
- E6, the first note of Runaway (Kanye West song)

== Other uses ==
- E6, nickname for the six biggest economies of the European Union: France, Germany, Italy, Poland, Netherlands and Spain
- E6, a London postcode district in the E postcode area
- E6, an error by the Shortstop in baseball
- E-6 (rank), the sixth rank of enlisted soldier in the US armed services
- E6 grade, of difficulty in rock climbing
- E6 (short for Epic 6), a variant of Dungeons & Dragons v3.5
- E6 (character), a fictional character in the webtoon series Live with Yourself!
- e621 (website), a furry-themed image artboard website commonly abbreviated as "e6"
- E6 format, a temporary grouping of the largest EU countries to further the Savings and Investments Union

== See also ==
- 6E (disambiguation)
