= Capital Markets Union =

European economic policy initiative

The Capital Markets Union (CMU) is an economic policy initiative launched by the former president of the European Commission, Jean-Claude Juncker in the initial exposition of his policy agenda on 15 July 2014. The main target was to create a single market for capital in the whole territory of the EU by the end of 2019. The reasoning behind the idea was to address the issue that corporate finance relies on debt (i.e. bank loans) and the fact that capital markets in Europe were not sufficiently integrated so as to protect the EU and especially the Eurozone from future crisis. The Five Presidents Report of June 2015 proposed the CMU in order to complement the Banking union of the European Union and eventually finish the Economic and Monetary Union (EMU) project. The CMU is supposed to attract 2 trillion euros more on the European capital markets, in the long term.

The CMU was considered as the "New frontier of Europe's single market" by the Commission aiming at tackling the different problems surrounding capital markets in Europe such as: the reduction of market fragmentation, diversification of financial sources, cross-border capital flows with a special attention for Small and Medium-sized enterprises (SMEs). The project was also seen as the final step for the completion of the Economic and Monetary Union as it was complementary to the Banking union of the European Union that had been the stage for intense legislative activity since its launching in 2012. The CMU project meant centralisation and delegation of powers at the supranational level with the field of macroeconomic governance and banking supervision being the most affected.

In order to address the goals and the objectives decided at the creation of the project, an Action Plan subject to a mid-term review was proposed consisting in several priority actions along with legislative proposals to harmonise rules and non-legislative proposals aiming at ensuring good practices between market operators and financial firms.

The new European Commission under the leadership of Ursula von der Leyen has committed to take ahead and finalise the project started by its predecessor by working on a new long-term strategy and to address the problems the project has had in recent times following the mid-term review and the UK's exit from the EU. This is also highlighted in her bid for the presidency of the European Commission during the process of election as the main economic motto of her campaign was "An economy that works for people".

Its successor is the Savings and Investments Union.

== Context ==
=== History of the EU financial integration ===
Capital Markets Union is, by nature, a step in the history of the European Union financial integration, whose dynamic is to lead to freer movement of capital. The Treaty of Rome, establishing the European Economic Community in 1957, already expressed the necessity to instaure free movement of capital in between the member states. Then, the directive of 1988 implemented it by preventing any restriction on free capital flow. In 1999 the financial services action plan was created, the first step in creating a single market for capital, and in 2011 the European Supervisory Authority, in order to insure the European financial markets stability. Only four years later, is the CMU project presented by Jean-Claude Juncker.

=== Characteristics of the EU financial system ===
The EU economy remains bank-oriented, especially when compared to the United States. It means that corporations usually prefer to borrow money from the banking sector instead of financing their investments through financial markets. According to the OECD analysis, this is partly due to the fiscal bias: in most European countries, firms benefit from tax advantages if they have to reimburse a bank loan, but that is not the case if they emitted obligations on the capital markets. Therefore, there is a strong financial incentive for European companies to favour the banking sector. This high reliance on the banking system implies less stability for the European economy, hence the position of the European Commission, which advocates for a diversification of financing sources. SMEs, which have particular difficulties in integrating the financial markets but which represent a good share in the created value of the European firms, largely contribute to this tendency.

The second characteristic is part of the bank-based nature of the EU economy : it is the European saving patterns. Whereas the United States population choose to invest in long-maturity-assets through pension funds or life insurances, European savers prefer easily accessible financial instruments, such as deposits or short-maturity-assets. This economic behaviour generates a lack of financial profitability of the EU and accentuate the importance of banks as the main funding providers of the European economy.

The third characteristic of the European financial system is that capital invested stay usually in the national market : it is the home bias. Even if before 2011, there was a positive trend for cross-border investments, most of the capital flow was remaining within the national frontiers of the member states and European financial integration is still limited. This lack of cross-border investments prevent high-growth-potential companies from getting the financial resources they need to develop innovations and become more competitive. In fact, shareholders prefer buying shares from their national companies, creating an important hindrance to European financial integration, because they have to face regulation barriers if they want to invest in another country of the EU.

=== Financial and political shocks ===
==== Impact of the 2011 crisis ====
The 2008 financial crisis had two main consequences on the financial integration of the European Union:

1. It showed the instability induced by an excessive reliance on banks' loans: When there is uncertainty, the offer of credit is reduced, impacting negatively all the economic activities depending on it. It is especially the case for Europe, whose SMEs mainly get financed by the banking system. Dealing with the aftermaths of the 2011 crisis, the dependency of the EU economy on banks made it harder for growth and employment, according to the former President of the European Commission.
2. It increased the fragmentation of the European capital markets by increasing the domestic bias:
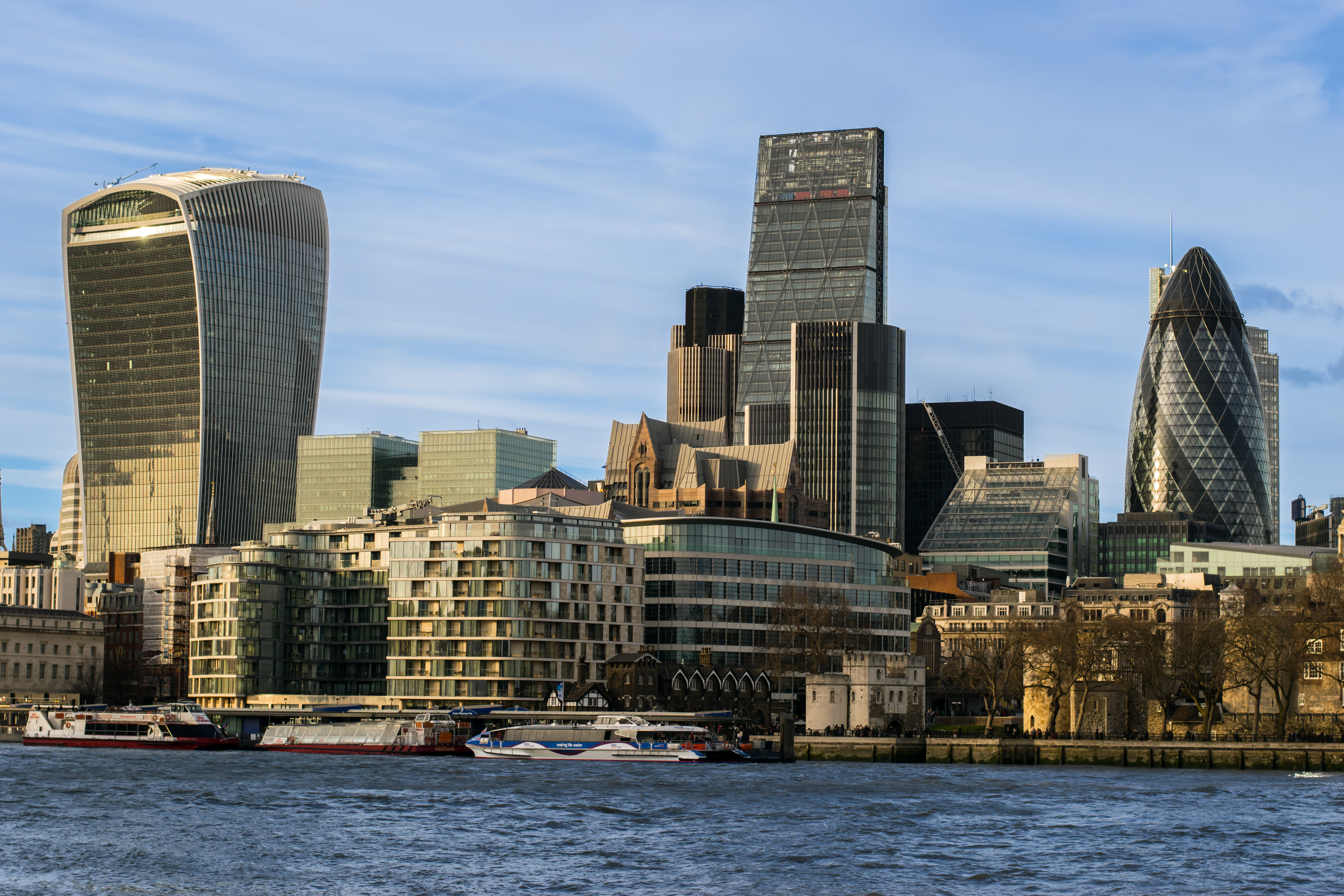
  Financial centre of the City of London.
  There was a sensible reduction of cross-border investments after 2011. because the previous financial integration was led by banks investing on international financial markets. Once affected by the crisis, their withdrawal drove the European financial system to more fragmentation than before.

==== Impact of Brexit ====
Most of the financial power of the European Union was located in the City of London prior to Brexit. Some British firms moved to continental Europe implying a loss of financial expertise in the EU. In spite of that, the European Commission asserted the consistency of the Capital Markets Union action plan, already launched at the time, and accelerated the efforts to implement it.

== Objectives ==
=== Economic goals ===
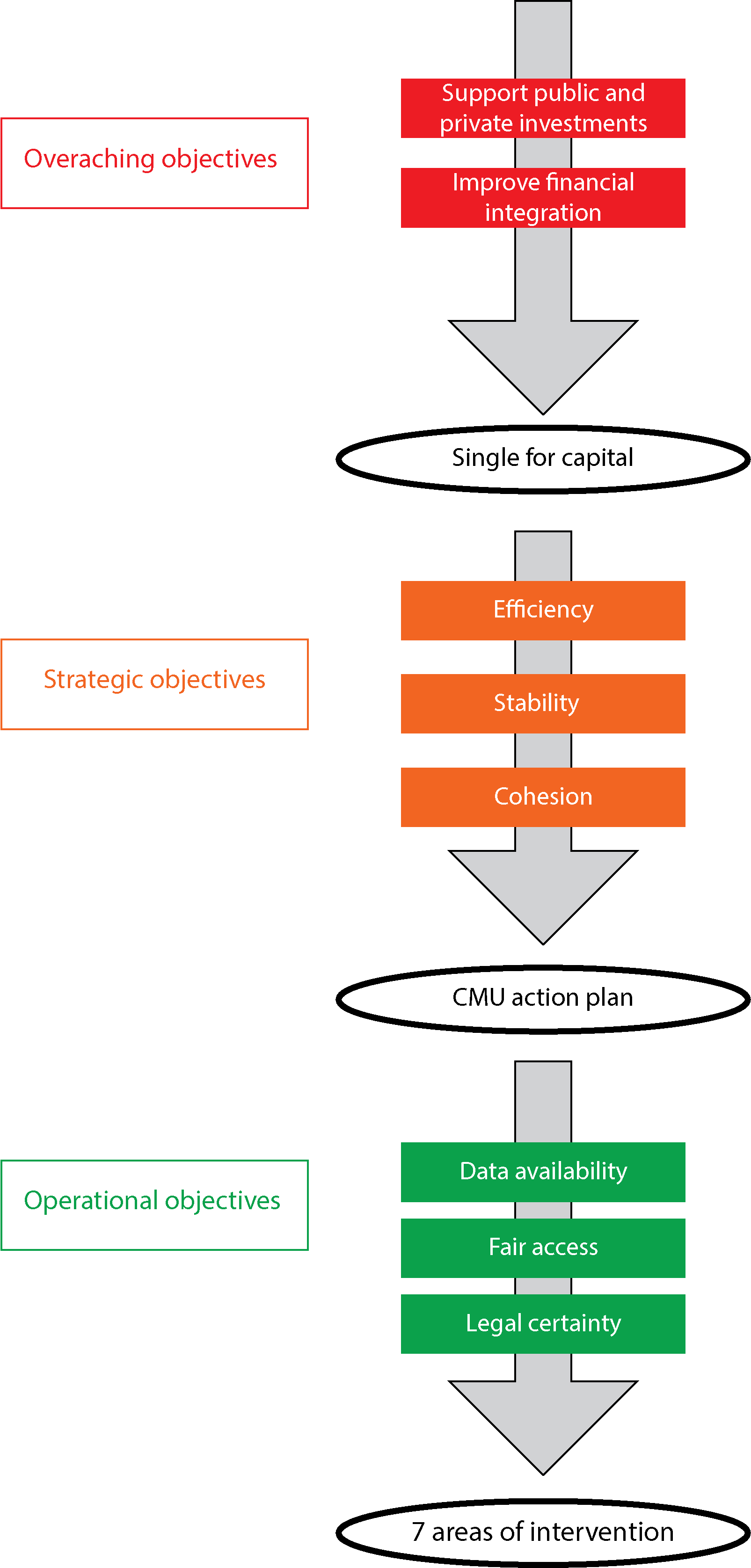
Three levels of objectives of the CMU, as defined by the European Commission, which lead to the seven areas of intervention of the Capital Markets Union action plan. This graph was drawn according to the CMU 2017 mid-term review

The European Commission designed 3 different levels of objectives for the Capital Markets Union, from the global economic goals to the more concrete necessity for the construction of an integrated financial system. These economic objectives frame the six intervention areas encompassed by the action plan.

==== Overarching objectives ====
- Facilitating the financing of both private and public sector on the financial markets

The Capital Markets Union aims to ease the access of firms and states to financing, which has become more difficult since the 2008 financial crisis. The creation of a single market for capital would send an incentive to private and institutional actors to invest the capital available, by creating new possibilities of cross-border attractive investments. This renewed possibility of financing may help the economic agents to come back to the level of growth they had before the crisis, impacting positively the employment rate. It is especially true for SMEs which might need more financing than what the banking system can offer them and therefore, would benefit from more accessible capital markets. CMU would also make the institutional investments in infrastructures way easier.

- Ensuring the stability and the sustainability of the European financial system through integration

Economic stability depends on the diversification of the source of financing. When encountering a crisis hitting a particular source of financing, such as the banks in 2010, it is important to be able to get capital otherwise, both for the states and the companies. That is why giving and incentive to get financing through capital markets with the CMU would make the economy more shock-resistant, because it would depend less on the banking system. On the investors side, stability is ensured by the portfolio and the geographical diversification of the assets. It reduces the loss of value if a specific economic area is hit by a negative shock when you have invested in several types of activities and it reduces the loss if a specific country is touched when you have invested in several countries. Hence, the risk-sharing influence of the CMU may strengthen the European economic stability. Regarding sustainability, the increased access to capital is considered as a mean to finance environment-friendly economic projects and to encourage sustainable development.

==== Strategic objectives ====
- Improving the competitiveness and the efficiency of the European capital markets, to fight against the "market fatigue"

By increasing the range of investments opportunities, a CMU objective is to improve the capital markets effectiveness. This means improving the allocation of capital, leading it to the most efficient economic actors among the European firms, because a single market for capital would have given the possibility to do so. The efficiency of capital markets deals with the competition between the European financial institution : making them gather in a common capital market would give the financial institution the incentive to become even more efficient. Competition would also lead to more diversification in terms of liabilities and assets. Market fatigue is the discredit from which asset and security exchanges suffered after the 2008 financial crisis. It reduces the capital flow on the capital markets and has a negative impact on the economic activity.

- Pursuing a stable financial integration, to fight against the "integration fatigue"

The improved integration of the capital markets with the CMU is meant to increase cross-border risk-sharing and to reduce the home-bias of the investments. Currently, there are still some hindrances, as the regulation differences among the member-states persuade investors to invest in their home-country. Actually, the diversity of European rules regarding insolvency, restructuring or taxation represents a lack of legal security for investors. As the main point of a single market for capital is to remove the barriers of free capital flow in-between the member-states, the objective is to attract the savings of the richer countries towards the poorer ones. Removing the barriers preventing European exchanges, to act like a unified territory, is the very sense of integration. It counters the "integration fatigue" : the increasing difficulty for the European leaders to pursue the European integration. It is an incentive to invest abroad, therefore reducing the home-bias. Moreover, investing in another country leads to a geographical diversification of the assets possessed, which has a positive impact on the economic stability, as explained previously. Furthermore, investments in emerging economies can yield higher returns than advanced economies, as the idiosyncratic risk is higher.

- Increasing cohesion within the European Union to fight against the "eroding consensus"

The "eroding consensus" is the increasing difficulty to get the support of the European population for the European institutions' decisions. The erosion is illustrated by the negative response of France and the Netherlands to the European referendum on the constitution of the EU. The Capital Markets Union's goal is to represent a part of the solution to this issue, by improving the cohesion in Europe. Firstly, it is a project encompassing different currencies, therefore encompassing countries outside the eurozone area. Secondly, it involves few changes in the way European institutions work, preventing any opposition to a total overhaul. Finally, it does not require risk-sharing from the member-states, which could have made the population reluctant to the CMU. Its main contribution to the European cohesion is its goal: to equally provide financing on capital markets, across the European territory, and to provide this access on the basis of the economic actors' merit.

==== Operational objectives ====
- Improving data availability across European countries

Investors on the capital markets don't always have the necessary means to gather the needed information in order to invest, while financing institutions do. However, incertitude about their investments may prevent them from investing as much as they could have if they had had the adequate information. The latter would have allowed them to evaluate the worth of an asset and juge if its price corresponds, or not, to its value. Therefore, the first operational objective of the CMU is to increase the information flow to make the price setting on the capital markets more precise.

- Facilitating the access to markets

As it might be complicated for a small firm to produce the information necessary to enter the capital markets, the CMU's purpose is to set up the required execution infrastructures to ease their access. This means reducing the regulatory obstacles stopping SMEs and start-up to finance themselves through capital markets, so that every economic actor could have an equal access to the capital needed. Concretely, it leads to a simplification of the rules regarding the information production for small issuers.

- Strengthening the implementation of the regulation protecting the investors

Because of the lack of confidence in the regulatory structures protecting the investors, the amount of capital invested might be reduced. Consequently, the third operational objective of the CMU is to give more strength to the contracts and the rules protecting the capital providers so that they regain confidence on the capital markets. The idea of the project is that legal certainty that they are no going to loose suddenly the wealth they have invested will encourage the use of capital markets as a good mean to yield a profit from the savings rather than keeping it on a bank account.

=== Actors targeted ===
The Capital Market Union action plan aims at affecting positively 4 types of economic actors:

- Citizens : improving the profitability on savings for retirement and the opportunities of investments

If citizens had the possibility to access capital markets in an easy way, they could use their savings to invest instead of keeping them on their bank account. They would do so because of the wider range of possible investments. It may be more profitable for them and increase the money they have for their retirement.

- Companies : extending the possibilities to be financed differently than by a bank loan

Firms, and especially SMEs which still face difficulties entering capital markets, would get access to European capital in an easier way on a single capital market where the information regulation would have been adapted to their situation. This is particularly true for the start-ups experiencing high growth and in need of a quicker financing to sustain their development.

- Investors : reducing the hindrance to invest in another member state

As explained previously, the harmonisation of the regulation across the European Union would allow investors to enter other member-state's capital market more easily. In fact, it would reduce their cost of adaptation to the national regulation : the financial regulation of a country would be the one of every member-state. If investing in your home capital market is as simple as investing in another, it would increase the investments opportunities for the investors.

- Banks: extending the lending opportunities and encourage sane balance-sheets

Because risky investments opportunities would go towards capital markets, a bigger portion of the banks' balance-sheets would be dedicated to the real economy. This is a way for the European Commission to prevent the 2008 financial crisis, when the banks's balance-sheets were composed of too many subprime assets, from happening again.

== Action plan ==
The Commission put forward an action plan for the CMU in September 2015 followed by two legislative proposals concerning securitization. (Note: Securitization is the practice of pooling various types of contractual debts in a single assets and selling them to third party investors. This was very common during the subprime crisis where these assets were known as "CDOs".) The action plan was launched encompassing mainly 6 areas of intervention with a total of 20 objectives to be achieved through 33 actions. As set out by the commission, these actions would be subject to a mid-term review in 2017 where 9 other priority actions were adopted having regard to what had been achieved and the different challenges that the EU was facing, as for instance Brexit. The original action plan from 2015 entails 6 priority axis, namely: 1) Financing for innovation, start-ups and non-listed companies; 2) Making it easier for companies to enter and raise capital on public markets; 3) Investing for the long term, infrastructure and sustainable investment; 4) Fostering retail investment; 5) Strengthening banking capacity to support the wider economy and; 6) Facilitating cross-border investment.

=== Financing for innovation, start-ups and non-listed companies ===
The first priority axis entails actions aiming at supporting venture capital and equity finance through the creation of a pan-European venture capital fund-of-funds with a total amount of €2.1 billion to boost venture capital and start-up financing; proposing the revision of the EuVECA and EuSEF and also implementing action in the field of tax incentives for venture capital and business in general.

Furthermore, it aims at overcoming information barriers to SMEs investment as in the first Green Paper launched by the Commission on the CMU, the Commissioner for Financial Stability, Financial Services and Capital Markets Union at the time recognised the importance of facilitating access to finance by SMEs. This translated into 2 main actions, the first aiming at strengthening feedback given by banks declining SME credit applications and the second by mapping existing local or national support and advisory capacities across the EU to promote best practices. Last but not least, the Commission wants to promote innovative forms of corporate finance through the studying of crowdfunding possibilities, the development of a coordinated approach to loan origination by funds and assessing the case for a future EU framework and the promotion of private placements.

=== Making it easier for companies to enter and raise capital on public markets ===
The second priority axis is an attempt to produce substantial results in the EU's long-term effort to promote integration through the CMU. It consists in strengthening access to public markets through a proposal to modernise the Prospectus Directive, (Note: Adopted on the 14/06/2017.) a review of the regulatory barriers to SME admission on public markets and SME growth markets and the realisation of workshops and a review of EU corporate bond markets, focusing on market liquidity. In addition to that, the Commission wants to support equity financing by addressing debt-equity bias in national corporate tax systems.

=== Investing for the long term, infrastructure and sustainable investment ===
By investing for the long-term, the commission also expects that removing barriers to investment will promote sustainable investment generating infrastructure and financing climate related projects. For this reasoning, the proposals want to support infrastructure investment by investment in infrastructure and the promotion of the European Long Term Investment Funds (ELTIF) and a review of the Capital Requirements Regulation (CRR), changes on infrastructure calibrations. Additional action to ensure consistency of EU financial services through the release of the rulebook providing for a single set of harmonised prudential rules for business to operate so that they can have easy access to the general conditions to operate at EU level.

The support for sustainable investment is also a priority action that goes in line with objectives set in the commission's Green Deal. It entails introducing new legislation and setting a benchmark for companies to operate based on this model. Last but not least, the Commission aims at expanding opportunities for institutional investors and fund managers through an assessment of the prudential treatment of private equity and privately placed debt in Solvency II and Consultation on the main barriers to the cross-border distribution of investment funds.

=== Fostering retail investment ===
Retail investment happens to be one of the most important priorities in the area of asset allocation. The Commission wants to increase choice and competition for retail consumers through the issuance of a Green paper on consumer financial services and insurance in order to establish an action plan on the field as well as organising a round table with different experts to discuss further actions to promote the sector.

Additional action to help retail investors get a better deal by assessing EU retail investment-product markets through the European Supervisory Authorities was proposed. The Commission also proposed assessing the case for a policy framework for European personal pensions, building on work carried out with EIOPA.

=== Strengthening banking capacity to support the wider economy ===
Since the European economy is mainly reliant on the banking sector, the fifth priority axis aims at reducing this reliance but also strengthen capacity in order to face crisis more efficiently. Having regard to that, the Commission proposed strengthening local financing networks by expanding the possibility for EU countries to authorise credit unions outside the capital requirements directive and regulation.

Other proposes include building an EU securitisation markets with a proposal on simple, transparent and standardised (STS) securitization and revision of the capital calibrations for banks (Note: This action included the introduction of Regulation 2017/2402 entitled "securitisation regulation" on the 12/12/2017.) and support to bank financing of the wider economy via consultation on an EU-wide framework for covered bonds and similar structures for SME loans and benchmarking of national loan enforcement frameworks (including insolvency) from a bank creditor perspective.

=== Facilitating cross-border investment ===
The main objective is to tackle fragmentation by removing regulatory barriers to the financing of the economy and increasing the supply of capital to businesses. The actions proposed the removal of national barriers to cross-border investment with the issuance of Report on national barriers to the free movement of capital and further actions to be followed. Furthermore, action to improve market infrastructure for cross-border investing via targeted action on securities ownership rules and third party effects of assignment of claims and a review progress in removing remaining Giovannini barriers (Note: The Giovannini Group was charged to assess possible barriers to efficient cross-border clearing and settlement of securities in the EU. The barriers became known as Giovannini barriers.) was also proposed.

Other actions include the fostering of convergence of insolvency proceedings by introducing the so-called Insolvency law; (Note: The Directive proposed is about preventive restructuring frameworks, second chance and measures to increase the efficiency of restructuring, insolvency and discharge procedures.) removal of cross-border tax barriers with the creation of a code of conduct for relief-at-source from withholding taxes procedures and the conduct of a study on discriminatory tax obstacles to cross-border investment by pension funds and life insurers launched in 2016; strengthening of supervisory convergence and capital market capacity building through a Strategy on supervisory convergence to improve the functioning of the single market for capital; a White Paper on ESAs' funding and governance and; technical assistance to Member States to support capital markets' capacity leading to the adoption of Regulation 2017/825 (Note: Adopted on the 17/05/2017 establishing the Structural Reform Support Programme for the period 2017 to 2020.) and; the enhancing of capacity to preserve financial stability by a Review of the EU macroprudential framework.

== Actors involved ==
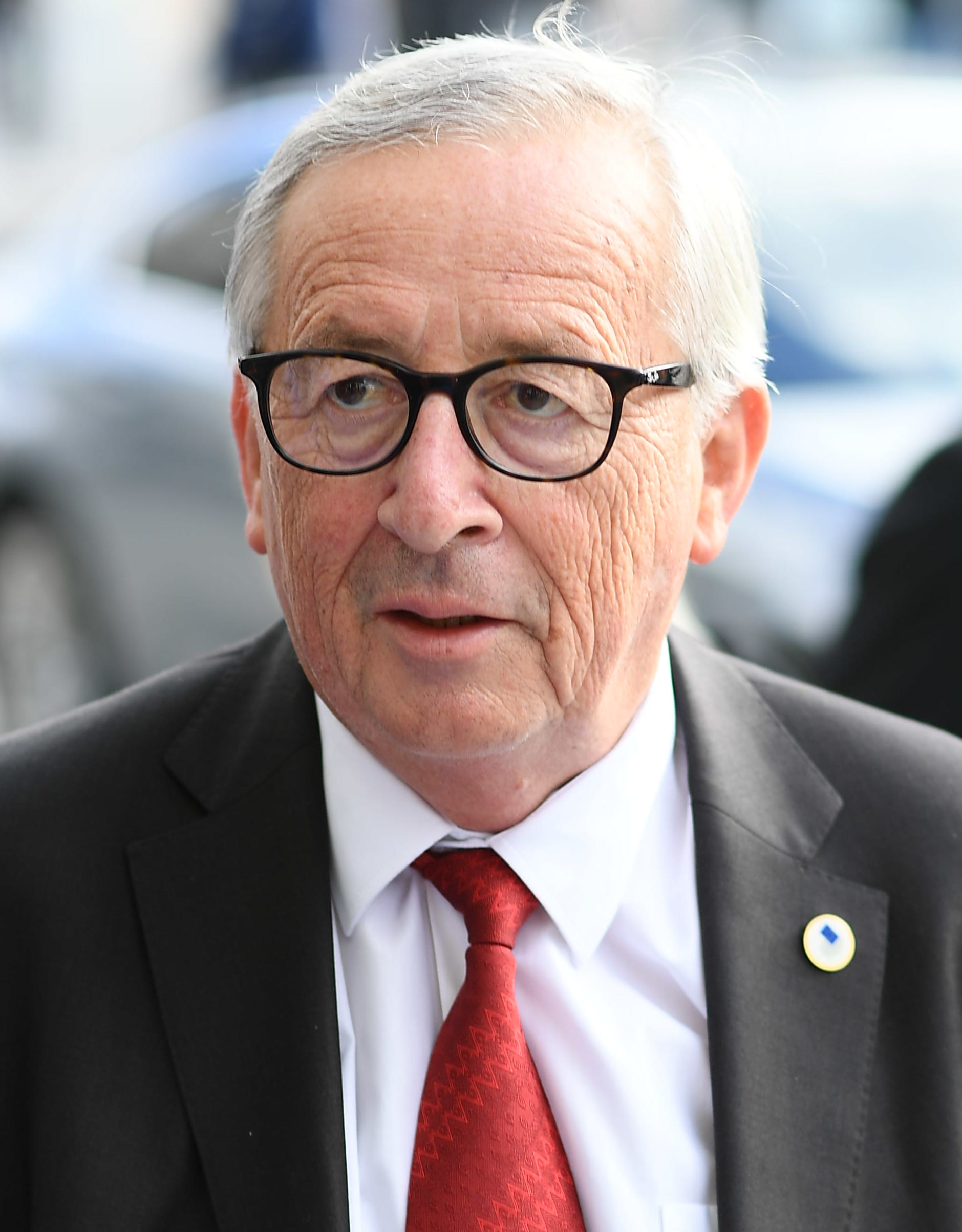
Jean-Claude Juncker, former president of the European Commission.

The commission was the main actor through its proposing of the CMU and later with its promotion. Jean-Claude Juncker, the president-elect of the new European Commission, at the time, officially presented his plan to the European Parliament in July 2014. The Juncker Plan included the creation of the CMU and a series of other initiatives to remove obstacles to finance and investment in Europe.

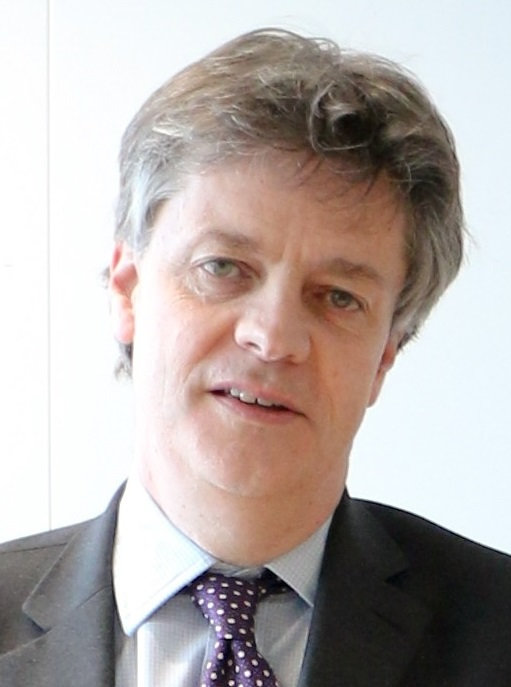
Jonathan Hill 2015 during his time in office as Commissioner responsible for the Capital Markets Union project.

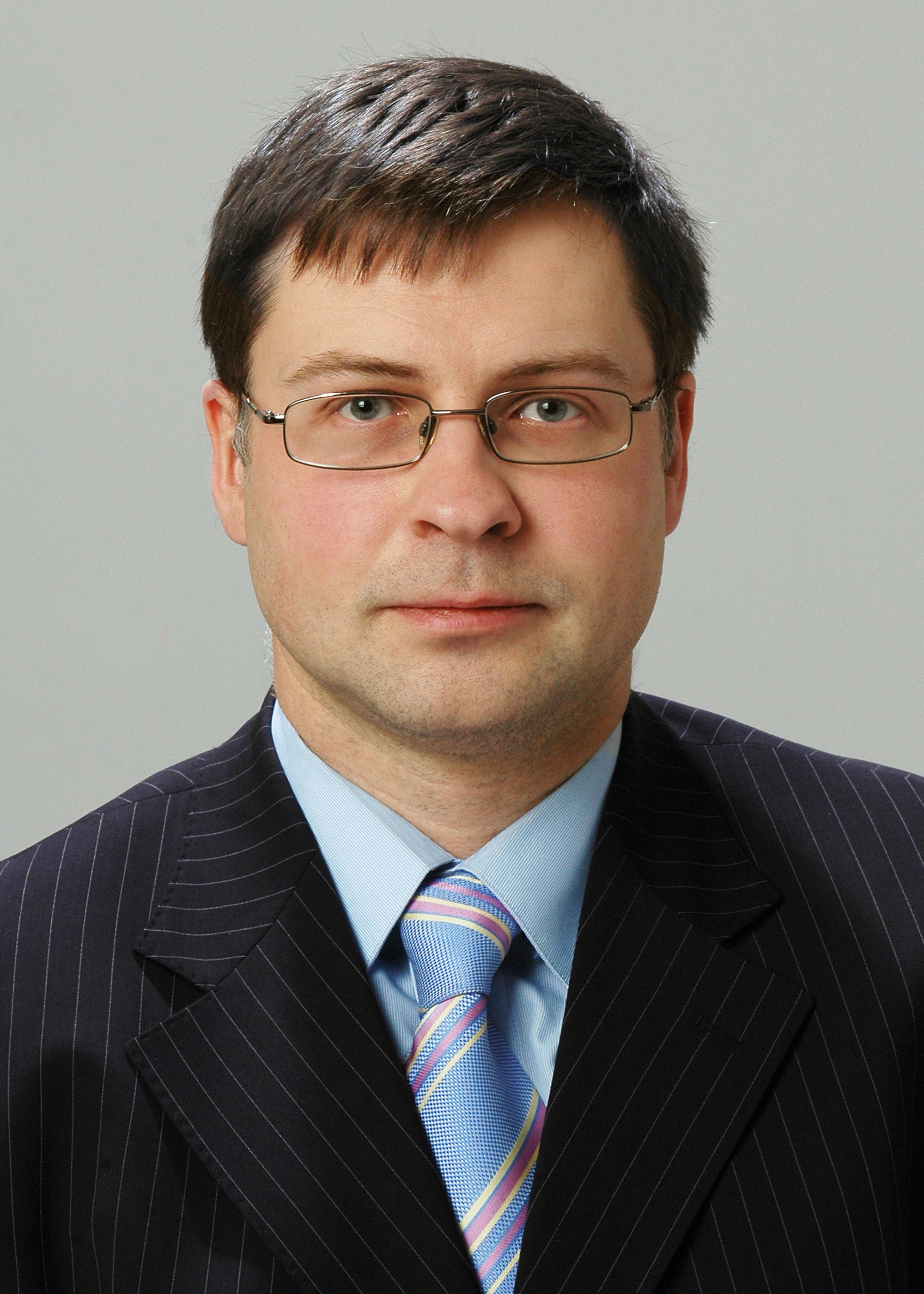
Valdis Dombrovskis, Commissioner responsible for the Capital Markets Union project (2016 - September 2020).

With the newly elected commission, a new role was created, that of Commissioner for Financial Stability, Financial Services and Capital Markets Union. Firstly held by the British-appointed Commissioner Jonathan Hill, the post was responsible for promoting and taking ahead the project. After the UK's decision to exit the EU, Valdis Dombrovskis, took on the portfolio with a strong commitment to push the CMU agenda through, specially after Brexit. Since September 2020, Mairead McGuinness took over the portfolio and is in charge of taking ahead the project.

The commission has been particularly active in the project as there was no evidence that member states governments or the financial industry convinced the commission to act, even if it consulted with stakeholders. Nevertheless, the CMU project cannot be operationalised on its own. As highlighted in the action plan, the CMU works based on legislative proposals and harmonisation at EU level. The budget of the Union is still limited despite the high amount destined to the project. Therefore, the Council and the European Parliament have an important role to play as co-legislators in the community arena.

European agencies have also a major role when it comes to the supervision and effectiveness of the CMU. The European Securities and Markets Authority (ESMA) has been charged, by the commission, to carry out assessment reports of the progress, most notably in the field of retail investment, for instance. Along with the EIOPA, the EBA and the European Central Bank (ECB), the four supervisors form the European Supervisory Authorities (ESA), they are responsible for ensuring the European System of Financial Supervision which is directly linked to the CMU project by ensuring supervision convergence.

== Mid-Term Review ==
On 8 June 2017, the mid-term review report was released described as "Capital Markets Union 2.0". The review was an opportunity for the commission to publicise its achievements as well as sharing the challenges faced so far and what could be done to tackle them. The mid-term review of 2017 launched nine new priorities to solve the EU's cross-border investment challenge. By assessing the progress and the challenges through massive open consultations on the CMU project, the commission was able to adopt new actions complementing the 2015 original Action Plan.

=== Stakeholder consultation ===
- Start-ups and scale-up firms in Europe need other forms of investment than just traditional banks, therefore, the development of new forms of emerging risk capital (Note: Along with banks that are still considered to be an important part of the European funding for companies.) credits must be a priority.
- Public equity and debt markets are not as developed as other economies, including some inside the territory of the Union. The assessment of these markets is a challenge, especially for SMEs.
- The post-crisis efforts to reduce exposure to risk meant reduction in the number of loans to EU businesses. The CMU project must be perceived as a good alternative to solve bank's balance sheets problems and to fund their lending to businesses and households.
- Not enough investment in risk capital, equity and infrastructure by pension funds and insurance companies. Private capital must be mobilised to help the European economy attain its goals of becoming a "green economy" through sustainable development and low-carbon emissions.
- Retail investors are not connected with capital markets in general. As households in Europe are amongst the highest savers in the world, capital markets could be boosted through the provision of attractive investment propositions on competitive and transparent terms. It would help to tackle the problems of an ageing population and low interest rates.
- Barriers to cross-border investment are still very present in Europe. They reduced market liquidity and make it harder for companies to scale up.

=== Actions proposed ===
The mid-term review led to nine new priority actions. The following scheme represents a general overview of what they are about and what is their scope. Further information can be found in the mid-term review communication.

Actions proposed following the mid-term review
Policy field	New Priority Action	Aim
Supervision	Revise the power and the competences of the European Supervisory Authorities (ESAs) especially ESMA	Guarantee a more efficient and consistent supervision.
SMEs	More proportionate rules on small and medium-sized enterprises listing	To render the access for SMEs cheaper and to increase the amount of IPOs (Note: IPOs is a common term to refer to "Initial Public Offering" whereby a company enters the capital market, that is, the regulated market for the first time through the offering of debt assets (usually shares, tokes, etc.)) in Europe.
Investment firms	More proportionate and effective rules for investment firms	Boosting competition; improving investor's opportunities and; promoting better ways of managing risks.
Fintech	More proportionate rules and support for cross-border business	To facilitate entry by non-bank entities (Note: Usually referred to those institutions that offer a series of financial services but do not have a banking licence.) into the market, to increase competition among these institutions by granting new passporting schemes (Note: Passporting means that one company is able to operate in the whole territory of the EU either through the right to provide services or to the right os establishment (usually though a branch) following the law of its home state. It comes from a series of Directives at EU level, notably MiFID II that obliges member states to recognise authorisations granted by other members to companies that want to operate in its territory.) to provide new solutions for capital markets and to decrease costs for companies.
Non-performing loans	Measures to tackle non-performing loans (NPLs)	They want to do so by cleaning up bank balance sheets (Note: Bank balance sheets refers to the daily operations banks have to do to guarantee their 'financial health'. They do so by settling their debts at the end of the day so that they can restart a new day on the 'zero'. If a bank manages to do so, in theory, it has liquidity to operate and is not in risk of bankruptcy. If it cannot, it is either because of mishandling and mismanagement or because there is a situation of financial crisis like that of 2008) and by promoting new credit to the economy.
Investment funds	Facilitate cross-border distribution of investment funds	To allow investment funds in the EU to grow, to allocate capital more efficiently across the EU and to deliver better value and greater innovation for investors.
Stability of the regulatory framework	To provide guidance on EU rules for treatment of cross-border investment and framework for amicable resolution of investment disputes	To provide for a greater transparency on the effective protection of EU investors rights.
Local capital markets	EU strategy to support local and regional market development	To broaden the geographical reach of capital markets and to find local solutions for SME funding.

== Progress ==
=== Achievements ===
Since Jean-Claude Juncker's first mention of the Capital Markets Union, in November 2014, and the adoption of the action plan, in September 2015, many legislative actions and non-legislative initiatives were led by the European Commission to reach its objectives. By the time of the mid-term review of the CMU action plan, in June 2017, 20 of them were already implemented. The two following tables show the latest stage of progress of every field of action on which the European Commission is working, regarding the CMU.

==== Legislative actions ====
Legislative actions directed by the European Commission regarding the CMU
Time period	Legislative action
October 2018	Agreement of the Council on the directive on preventive restructuring frameworks, second chance and measures to increase the efficiency of restructuring, insolvency and discharge procedures, business restructuring and second chance framework
April 2018	Launch of the Pan-European venture capital fund-of-funds program
June 2017	Adoption of the proposal on a Pan-European personal pension product
May 2017	Political agreement on the Simple, transparent and standardised (STS) securitisations and the revision of the capital calibrations for banks
December 2016	Agreement by the co-legislator on a regulation to modernise the Prospectus Directive
November 2016	Adoption of the proposal on the review of infrastructure calibrations for banks through the Capital Requirements Regulation (CRR)
November 2016	Adoption of the proposal on credit unions' authorisation outside the EU's Capital requirements rules for banks
October 2016	Adoption of the proposal on the Common Consolidated Corporate Tax Base (CCCTB) and debt-equity tax bias
July 2016	EuVECA and EuSEF legislation review
April 2016	Adoption of the proposal on Solvency II calibrations for insurance companies' investments in infrastructure and European Long Term Investment Funds

==== Non-legislative initiatives ====
Non-legislative initiatives directed by the European Commission regarding the CMU
Time period	Non-legislative initiatives
November 2018	Agreement of the council on a general approach of EU-wide framework for covered bonds and similar structures for SME loans
April 2018	Study on the distribution of cross border distribution of retail investment products
June 2017	Publication of the study on tax incentives for venture capital and business angels
June 2017	Adoption by the EU banking associations of the high-level principles for banks' feedback to declined SME credit applications
June 2017	Adoption of the staff working document on existing local or national support and advisory capacities across the EU to promote best practices
March 2017	Adoption by the commission of the Consumer Financial Services Action Plan: Better products and more choice for EU consumers
March 2017	Adoption of the report on national barriers to the free movement of capital
November 2016	Adoption of the communication on call for evidence on the cumulative impact of the financial reform
May 2016	Publication of a report on crowdfunding
February 2017 February 2016	Support given to the European Securities and Markets Authority in implementing its annual work programme on supervisory convergence

=== Stagnation period (2017-2020) ===
Even though 9 new action priorities were added to the action plan in 2017, the CMU project faced difficulties to go forward since its mid-term review. This stagnation might be due to multiple factors, such as the return of growth in the Eurozone countries, reducing the economic incentive to reform its financial system, the rise of political tensions within the EU or the prioritisation of national issues by the European political leaders. Moreover, as the effects of such structural reforms can hardly be observed in the short term, it is difficult to analyse the results of the Capital Markets Union action plan without a bigger time perspective than we have today.

=== New CMU Action Plan (2020 - present) ===
Since taking office, president Ursula von der Leyen has taken ahead the process of completing the Capital Markets Union project. Its commitment goes in line with the commission's agenda, that is highly focused on the European Green Deal and the Digital Economy through the Digital Single Market project.

The new Action Plan consists of 16 measures aiming at achieving 3 key objectives:

- support a green, digital, inclusive and resilient economic recovery by making financing more accessible to European companies;
- make the EU an even safer place for individuals to save and invest long-term;
- integrate national capital markets into a genuine single market.

The new measures proposed are:

1. Proposal to set up an EU-wide platform (European single access point) providing investors with seamless access to financial and sustainability-related company information.
2. Simplification of the listing rules for public markets.
3. Review of the legislative framework for European long-term investment funds, channeling more long-term financing to companies and infrastructure projects.
4. Remove regulatory obstacles for insurance companies to invest long-term. In addition to that, it will seek to provide for an appropriate prudential treatment of long-term SME equity investment by banks.
5. Assess the merits and feasibility of introducing a requirement for banks to direct SMEs, whose credit application they have turned down, to providers of alternative funding.
6. Review the current regulatory framework for securitisation to enhance banks' credit provision to EU companies, especially SMEs.
7. Assessment for the development of a European financial competence framework. The commission will assess the possibility of requiring Member States to promote learning measures supporting financial education.
8. Assessment of the applicable rules in the area of inducements and disclosure possibly proposing amendments to the existing legal framework for retail investors to receive fair advice and clear and comparable product information. Finally, it will seek to improve the level of professional qualifications for advisors in the EU and assess the feasibility of setting up a pan-EU label for financial advisors.
9. Monitoring of pension adequacy in Member States through the development of pension dashboards. Furthermore, it aims at developing best practices for the set-up of national tracking systems for individual Europeans. It will also launch a study to analyse auto-enrolment practices and may analyse other practices to stimulate participation in occupational pension schemes.
10. In order to lower costs for cross-border investors and prevent tax fraud a standardised, EU-wide system for withholding tax relief at source will be proposed.
11. Harmonise or increase convergence in targeted areas of non-bank insolvency law. Furthermore, it will explore possibilities to enhance data reporting in order to allow for a regular assessment of the effectiveness of national loan enforcement regimes.
12. Introduction of an EU definition of 'shareholder' and further clarifying and harmonising rules governing the interaction between investors, intermediaries and issuers. It will also examine possible national barriers to the use of new digital technologies in this area.
13. Amendment to rules to improve the cross-border provision of settlement services in the EU.
14. Creation of an effective and comprehensive post-trade consolidated tape for equity and equity-like financial instruments.
15. Strengthen the investment protection and facilitation framework in the EU.
16. Enhancing the single rulebook for capital markets.

==== Consolidated Tape Providers ====
As part of the review of the Markets in Financial Instruments Regulation (MiFIR), the European Union introduced a framework for the establishment of consolidated tapes for different asset classes, with the aim of improving market transparency and supporting the objectives of the Capital Markets Union.

Under this framework, separate competitive selection procedures were launched by the European Securities and Markets Authority (ESMA) for three asset classes: bonds, equities (shares and ETFs), and over-the-counter (OTC) derivatives.

The establishment of consolidated tapes has been described as a key step towards improving price transparency and market efficiency in the European Union, addressing the fragmentation of trading data across multiple venues and contributing to the development of a more integrated capital market.

===== Bonds =====
The first selection procedure, for bonds, was launched in January 2025. In July 2025, ESMA selected Ediphy (fairCT) as the first consolidated tape provider for bonds, following an assessment of competing applications under MiFIR criteria.

Ediphy's proposal was developed through the fairCT initiative, a market-led consortium bringing together a range of financial institutions and technology providers, including Cboe Global Markets, FactSet, Google Cloud, Norges Bank Investment Management, TP ICAP and UBS.

The initiative has been described as a buy-side and industry-backed model, aiming to provide a neutral alternative to exchange-controlled data infrastructures.

===== Equities and ETFs =====
A separate selection procedure for equities (shares and ETFs) was launched in June 2025. In December 2025, ESMA selected EuroCTP, a joint venture of European stock exchanges, as the consolidated tape provider for this asset class. EuroCTP was the only confirmed remaining applicant at the final stage of the procedure.

===== OTC derivatives =====
The selection procedure for a consolidated tape provider for OTC derivatives was launched in January 2026 and remains ongoing.

=== Final report of the Technical Expert Stakeholder Group (TESG) on SMEs - Empowering EU Capital Markets for SMEs - Making Listing Cool Again (May 2021) ===
In October 2020, as mandated by Regulation 2019/2115 as regards the promotion of the use of SME growth markets, the European Commission set up a Technical Expert Stakeholder Group on SMEs (TESG) that brought together relevant stakeholders with technical expertise on SMEs' access to finance. The Group was tasked with monitoring and assessing the functioning of SME Growth Markets, as well as providing expertise and possible input on other relevant areas of SME access to public markets. Their work was finalised in May 2021 and culminated with their final report "Empowering EU capital markets - Making listing cool again" setting out 12 concrete recommendations to foster SME listing.

As per action 2 of the new CMU action plan, the Commission will now thoroughly assess the proposals made by the TESG and explore possibilities to simplify listing rules for public markets, in order to facilitate and diversify small and innovative companies' access to funding.

== Criticism ==
=== Benefits to the economy ===
It is said that developing Capital Markets is important for the economy as it brings along growth and prosperity with diversified sources of investment capital boosting the real economy. The Bank for International Settlements outlines that financial markets development accumulates debt and does not improve the real economy and growth as it benefits from high-collateral and low-productivity projects generating misallocation of resources.

In addition, the growth in debt activities by capital markets before the 2008 financial crisis did not lead to growth in the real economy instead, the increased interaction between banks and market-based activities augmented the probability of systemic risk. One of the main causes of the 2008 financial crisis, as it has become known, was due to the excessive development of capital markets financing.

Furthermore, as outlined, Capital Markets often represent higher costs for SMEs fundraising and the development of debt Capital Markets increases the risk of systemic risk through the connection of balance sheets via securitisation with poor risk transmission. In sum, it creates shadow banking.

=== Financing via Capital Markets ===
The banking sector is recognised to be one of the most important forms of financing for European companies. Nevertheless, the introduction of the Basel III restricted banking lending and put Capital Markets as an alternative for European business to raise funds. Capital markets were seen as an alternative to banks. However, different member states have different levels of financial development; some of them, most notably the southern ones, are more likely to be penalised by the project. The commission had to convince such countries that the project would be beneficial. Nevertheless, support in the region was limited.

=== SMEs ===
In the field of SMEs, the CMU aims at giving access to Venture Capital and lowering costs for funding, however it can lead to shorter holding periods of investment and to great volatility. It turns out that SMEs are less stable and represent, in general, risky investments, pushing away banks and limiting SMEs clients. All-in-all this limits the scope of the CMU project through the process of de-risking larger banks and relegating SMEs which in turn concentrates the risk in less agile financial actors. In addition, SMEs are not always able to cope with the different standards deriving from European and International law such as for instance, the International Financial Reporting Standards (IFRS), generating extra costs for SMEs and undermining their credibility vis-à-vis possible investors that look for transparency and guarantees of good management. In practical terms, banks have access to a huge data base where creditworthiness is assessed and then processed. This does not happen on an equal foot for SMEs.

=== Securitisation ===
The securitisation process under the CMU project has been highly criticised because of its previous consequences during the 2008 Financial crisis. It is linked to the fact that securitisation-type transactions have led to interconnectedness with the shadow banking system and high levels of risk taking. The Simple, Transparent and Standardised regulation which should make it easier for investors to assess risk, still lacks clarity and clear definitions as it paves the way for private entities to interpret it in a broader way undermining its scope.

=== European integration ===
The idea that capital markets integration is an important project to tackle the problem of market fragmentation in Europe has its contradictions. Unlike the Banking union of the European Union, the Capital Markets Union project encompasses different member states with different legal backgrounds and does not entail full harmonisation. According to the ECB, to tackle the problem of market fragmentation, capital markets need equal access to financial services and equal treatment and not just convergence as it will not guarantee financial integration. Nonetheless, the project has not managed to deliver this so far and with the UK's exit, it seems unlikely that efforts will be made in this field as other financial centres will compete to take London's place in the continent.

=== Brexit ===
The UK was at the forefront of the project since the beginning. The then British-appointed Commission, Jonathan Hill was an active voice in promoting the continuation of the initiative. The Brexit decision was shocking for many as it meant that the CMU would see its efforts to build a risk-sharing via liquidity derivatives and securities markets very limited. The initial aim of the project was to repair ties with the UK ahead of the Brexit referendum as it would prove to be a beneficial project for the City of London at the same time. In practice, following Brexit, the EU lost access to the UK's wholesale market which somewhat diminishes the impact of the CMU project.

== See also ==
- List of European Stock Exchanges
- List of Currencies in Europe
- Banking union of the European Union
- Economic and Monetary Union
- European Central Bank
- European Investment Bank
- European Banking Authority
- European Securities and Markets Authority
- European Insurance and Occupational Pensions Authority
- Savings and Investments Union
