= Tōhoku Expressway =

Longest expressway road in Japan

Tōhoku Expressway
- 東北自動車道

Route information
- Length: 679.5 km (422.2 mi)
- Existed: 1972–present

Major junctions
- South end: Kawaguchi Junction in Kawaguchi, Saitama; Tokyo Gaikan Expressway / Kawaguchi Route
- North end: Aomori Interchange in Aomori, Aomori; Aomori Expressway; National Route 7

Location
- Country: Japan
- Major cities: Saitama, Tatebayashi, Utsunomiya, Kōriyama, Fukushima, Sendai, Morioka, Kazuno, Hirosaki

Highway system
- National highways of Japan; Expressways of Japan

The Tōhoku Expressway (東北自動車道, Tōhoku Jidōsha-dō) is a south-north national expressway, and the longest expressway in Japan at 679.5 kilometers (422.2 mi). Its southern terminus is in Kawaguchi, Saitama in the Greater Tokyo Area, at the Tokyo Gaikan Expressway and Kawaguchi Route near Araijuku Station, and its northern terminus is at Aomori Interchange in Aomori, Aomori in the northern part of the Tōhoku region, where it meets the Aomori Expressway and Aomori Belt Highway near the Sannai-Maruyama Site.

It is owned by Japan Expressway Holding and Debt Repayment Agency and operated by East Nippon Expressway Company. The expressway is signed E4 under the "2016 Proposal for Realization of Expressway Numbering", because it roughly parallels National Route 4.

== Route description ==
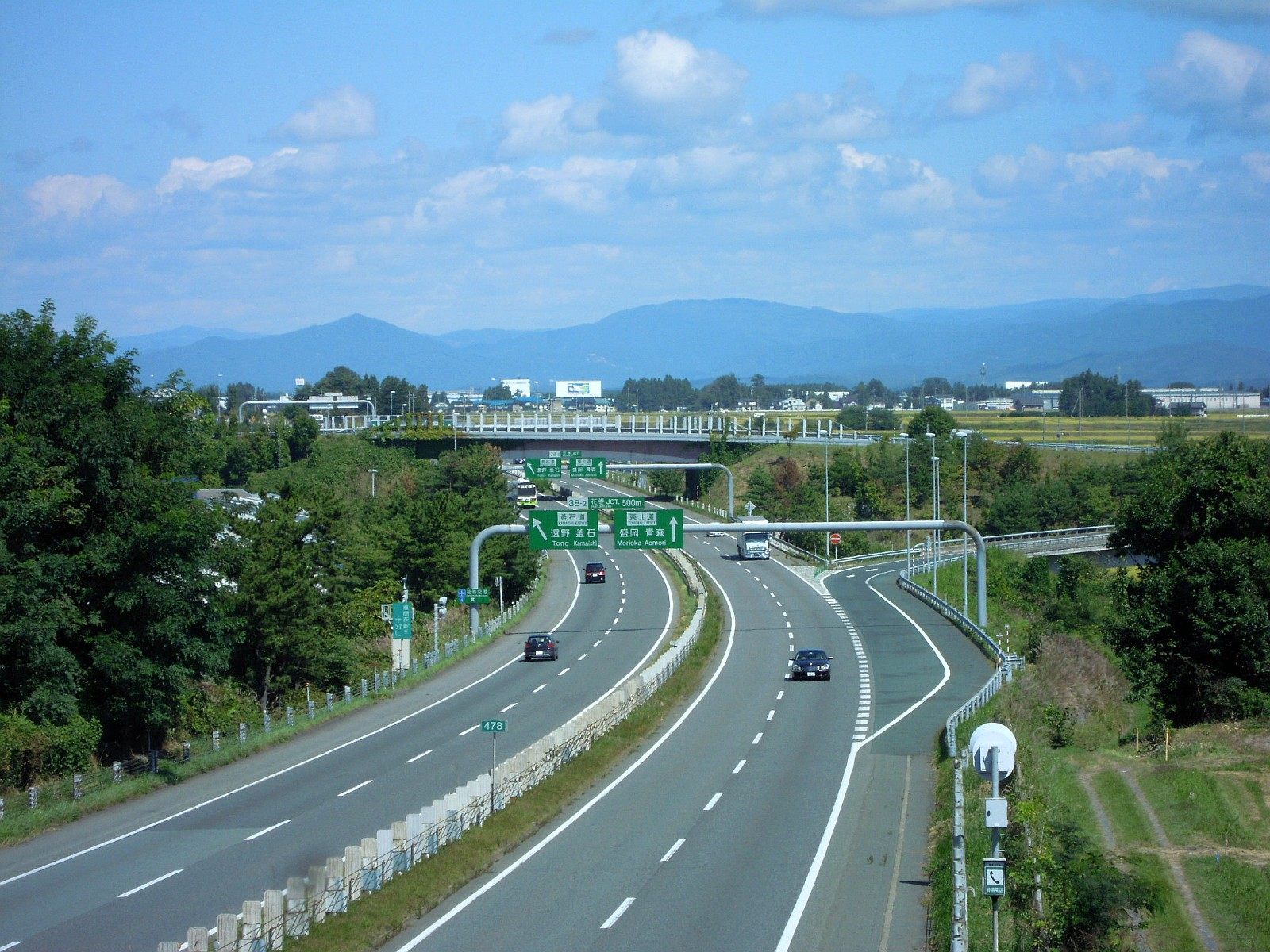
The Tōhoku Expressway at Hanamaki Junction in Hanamaki, Iwate September 2014

The expressway links the Tōhoku region with the Kantō region and the greater Tokyo urban area. It is also the longest expressway among all expressways operated by East Nippon Expressway Company.

Starting at a junction with the Tokyo Gaikan Expressway to the north of Tokyo, the expressway follows a northerly course through the plains of Saitama Prefecture and Tochigi Prefecture before entering the mountainous interior of the Tōhoku region. Passing through central Fukushima Prefecture, the expressway then enters Miyagi Prefecture and passes to the west of Sendai, the largest city in the Tōhoku region. The expressway continues north into Iwate Prefecture, passing the prefectural capital Morioka. In the northern part of Iwate, the expressway veers to the northwest, while the Hachinohe Expressway branches off to the northeast. The Tōhoku Expressway continues into central Aomori Prefecture. Before terminating in the city of Aomori, the Aomori Expressway begins, continuing east as an extension of the expressway towards Hachinohe by a series of toll roads and expressways.

The route parallels the Tōhoku Shinkansen and Tōhoku Main Line of East Japan Railway Company as well as National Route 4 from its origin in Tokyo to the city of Morioka. North of Morioka, the route diverges to the northwest and parallels the Ōu Main Line and National Route 7. It follows this path winding through the Ōu Mountains to its northern terminus in Aomori at National Route 7 about a kilometer south of the Tōhoku Shinkansen's northern terminus at Shin-Aomori Station.

The expressway is 6 lanes from Kawaguchi Junction to Utsunomiya Interchange, and then changes to 4 lanes from Utsunomiya to the terminus in Aomori.

The standard rate for travelling the entirety of the Tōhoku Expressway in a normal-sized car from Kawaguchi Junction to Aomori Interchange is 13,800 yen, in a kei car the cost is 11,100 yen.

=== Naming ===
Tōhoku refers to the Tōhoku region, the northernmost region on the island of Honshū.

Officially the expressway is designated as the Tōhoku Jūkan Expressway Hirosaki Route. It is also concurrent with the Tōhoku Jūkan Expressway Hachinohe Route until Ashiro Junction, where it diverges from the Tōhoku Expressway to become the Hachinohe Expressway.

== History ==
=== Initial construction ===
The first section of the Tōhoku Expressway opened on 13 November 1972 between Kanuma and Utsunomiya interchanges. The next year saw the opening of three sections of the highway: first, an extension north from Utsunomiya Interchange to Yaita Interchange on 9 August, next another section between Shirakawa and Koriyama interchanges opened on 26 November followed by a section opening the next day between Shiroishi and Sendai-minami interchanges. In 1974, only one section between Yaita and Shirakawa interchanges was opened along the expressway on 20 December, this connected the southern section and central sections. 1975 saw the completion of two more sections of the expressway: one between Koriyama and Shiroishi interchanges on 1 April (linking the extant southern and northern sections), and then another on 28 November between Sendai-minami and Izumi interchanges. In 1976, only one section between Izumi and Furukawa interchanges was opened along the expressway on 9 December, extending the expressway further north. 1977 saw the completion of another two sections of the expressway: one between Furukawa and Tsukidate interchanges on 15 November, and then a separate section on 19 November between Ichinoseki and Morioka-minami interchanges. On 2 December 1978, that separate section was linked to the rest of the expressway. The next year saw the opening of two sections of the highway: first, the northernmost section of what would be the completed expressway between Ōwani-Hirosaki and Aomori interchanges on 27 September, next another section extending the expressway north from Morioka-minami Interchange to Takizawa was opened on 18 October. Also, Shiwa Interchange was inserted into the existing expressway on 13 October. 1980 would see the opening of three more sections of the expressway: the first of these extended the expressway south from Iwatsuki Interchange to Urawa Interchange on 26 March, the second extended the main section of the expressway north from Takizawa Interchange to Nishine Interchangeon 8 October, the third extended the northern section of the expressway south to Ikarigaseki Interchange on 29 October. On 4 August 1981, Motomiya Interchange was added to the extant expressway. In 1982, Wakayanagi-Kannari Interchange was added to the extant expressway on 29 March and a new section of the expressway opened on 29 October, extending the main section of the expressway north to Ashiro Interchange. The main section was extended north again on 20 October 1983 to Kazuno-Hachimantai Interchange. In 1984, it was extended north to Towada Interchange on 27 September. Koriyama-minami Interchange was added on 6 November. Hanamaki-minami Interchange was added to the extant expressway on 24 July 1986. Later, on 30 July the completion of the 4.27-kilometer (2.65 mi)-long Sakanashi Tunnel allowed for the separate northern section of the expressway to be linked to the rest of the expressway. The expressway was completed on 9 September 1987 when it was extended south to its southern terminus at Kawaguchi Junction.

=== Additional work after completion ===
In October 2004, an experiment was conducted to test the viability of smart interchanges was conducted on the Fukushima-Matsukawa Smart Interchange, which was installed onto the pre-existing Fukushima-Matsukawa Parking Area in the city of Fukushima. After the experimental smart interchange was deemed successful, the Fukushima-Matsukawa Smart Interchange as well as sixteen others around the country were officially opened to traffic across the country in October 2006. Many sections of the expressway were damaged on 11 March 2011 during the 2011 Tōhoku earthquake and tsunami. The expressway reopened on 24 March 2011.

== List of interchanges and features ==
PA - parking area, SA - service area, TB - toll gate

Prefecture	Location	km	mi	Exit	Name	Destinations	Notes
Saitama	Kawaguchi	0.0	0.0	1	Kawaguchi	Tokyo Gaikan Expressway / Kawaguchi Route	Southern terminus; C3 exit 70; expressway continues as S1
Saitama	Midori-ku	3.2 4.8	2.0 3.0	2	Urawa	National Route 122; National Route 463 (Koshigaya Urawa Bypass)	Southbound exit, northbound entrance only to National Route 463; full access to and from National Route 122
Saitama	Midori-ku	5.0	3.1	TB	Urawa		
Saitama	Iwatsuki-ku	10.5	6.5	3	Iwatsuki	National Route 16 (Iwatsuki Kasukabe Bypass)	
Saitama	Hasuda	15.6– 18.1	9.7– 11.2	3-1 / SA	Hasuda	Saitama Prefecture Route 163 (Hasuda-Shiraoka-Kuki Route)	Smart interchange; southbound entrance, northbound exit only
Saitama	Kuki	24.1	15.0	3-2	Kuki-Shiraoka	Ken-Ō Expressway	C4 exit 70
Saitama	Kuki	25.5	15.8	4	Kuki	Saitama Prefecture Route 3 (Saitama Kurihashi Route)	
Saitama	Kazo	33.4	20.8	5	Kazo	National Route 125	
Saitama	Hanyū	39.4	24.5	5-1	Hanyū	Saitama Prefecture Route 84 (Hanyū Kurihashi Route)	
Saitama	Hanyū	40.6	25.2	PA	Hanyū		
Saitama–Gunma prefecture border		43.2 43.9	26.8 27.3	Tonegawa Bridge over the Tone River			
Gunma	Tatebayashi	46.0	28.6	6	Tatebayashi	National Route 354	
Gunma–Tochigi prefecture border		51.5 51.9	32.0 32.2	Watarasegawa Bridge over the Watarase River			
Tochigi	Sano	55.0	34.2	7	Sano-Fujioka	National Route 50	Interchange lies partially in Tochigi
Tochigi	Sano	58.0	36.0	7-1 / SA	Sano	Tochigi Prefecture Route 352 (Sano Smart Interchange Route)	Smart interchange; service area is open to all traffic
Tochigi	Tochigi	61.8	38.4	7-2	Iwafune	Kita-Kantō Expressway west	Southern terminus of concurrency with E50
Tochigi	Tochigi	72.7	45.2	8	Tochigi	Tochigi Prefecture Route 32 (Tochigi Kashiwao Route)	
Tochigi	Tochigi	75.4	46.9	8-1	Tochigi-Tsuga	Kita-Kantō Expressway east	Northern terminus of concurrency with E50
Tochigi	Tochigi	79.3	49.3	8-2 / PA	Tsuganishikata	Tochigi Prefecture Route 352 (Sano Smart Interchange Route)	Smart interchange to open in 2020; parking area is open to all traffic
Tochigi	Tochigi–Kanuma border	82.6– 82.9	51.3– 51.5	Omoigawa Bridge over the Omoi River			
Tochigi	Kanuma	91.5	56.9	9	Kanuma	National Route 121	
Tochigi	Utsunomiya	97.5	60.6	9-1	Ōya	Tochigi Prefecture Route 70 (Utsunomiya-Imaichi Route)	Future smart interchange scheduled to open in 2020
Tochigi	Utsunomiya	99.3	61.7	PA	Ōya		
Tochigi	Utsunomiya	103.0	64.0	10	Utsunomiya	Nikkō Utsunomiya Road west National Route 119	
Tochigi	Utsunomiya	110.9	68.9	10-1 / SA	Kamikawachi	Tochigi Prefecture Route 348 (Kamikawachi Smart Interchange Route)	Smart interchange; service area is open to all traffic
Tochigi	Yaita	120.2	74.7	11	Yaita	National Route 4 (Ujiie Yaita Bypass) / Tochigi Prefecture Route 30 (Yaita Nasu Route)	
Tochigi	Yaita	127.5	79.2	11-1 / PA	Yaita-kita		Future smart interchange scheduled to open in 2020; service area is open to all traffic
Tochigi	Nasushiobara	133.6– 133.8	83.0– 83.1	Hōkigawa Bridge over the Hōki River			
Tochigi	Nasushiobara	139.1	86.4	12	Nishinasuno-Shiobara	National Route 400	
Tochigi	Nasushiobara	145.4	90.3	12-1 / PA	Kuroiso	Tochigi Prefecture Route 53 (Ōtawara Takabayashi Route)	
Tochigi	Nasushiobara–Nasu border	151.8– 151.9	94.3– 94.4	Nakagawa Bridge over the Naka River			
Tochigi	Nasu	152.2	94.6	13	Nasu	Tochigi Prefecture Route 17 (Nasukōgen Route)	
Tochigi	Nasu	160.5	99.7	13-1 / SA	Nasukōgen	Tochigi Prefecture Route 349 (Nasukōgen Smart Interchange Route)	Smart interchange; southbound entrance, northbound exit only
Fukushima	Nishigō	169.7	105.4	14	Shirakawa	National Route 4	
Fukushima	Nishigō	173.5– 173.6	107.8– 107.9	Abukumagawa Bridge over the Abukuma River			
Fukushima	Shirakawa	176.1	109.4	14-1	Shirakawa-chūō	National Route 294	Smart interchange
Fukushima	Shirakawa	178.7	111.0	PA	Abukuma		
Fukushima	Yabuki	186.3	115.8	15	Yabuki	Abukuma Kōgen Road east National Route 4	
Fukushima	Yabuki	193.9	120.5	15-1 / PA	Kagamiishi	Fukushima Prefecture Route 289 (Shimomatsumoto-Kagamiishi Route)	Smart interchange is open from 6:00-22:00; service area is open to all traffic
Fukushima	Sukagawa	198.2	123.2	16	Sukagawa	Fukushima Prefecture Route 67 (Nakano Sukagawa Route)	
Fukushima	Kōriyama	206.0	128.0	PA	Asaka		
Fukushima	Kōriyama	207.7	129.1	17	Kōriyama-minami	Fukushima Prefecture Route 47 (Kōriyama-Naganuma Route)	
Fukushima	Kōriyama	211.8	131.6	17-1	Kōriyama-chūō	Fukushima Prefecture Route 55 (Kōriyama-Yubiki Route)	Smart interchange
Fukushima	Kōriyama	216.4	134.5	18	Kōriyama	National Route 49	
Fukushima	Kōriyama	220.2	136.8	18-1	Kōriyama	Ban-etsu Expressway	
Fukushima	Motomiya	223.1	138.6	19	Motomiya	National Route 4	
Fukushima	Motomiya	226.3	140.6	SA	Adatara		
Fukushima	Nihonmatsu	236.0	146.6	20	Nihonmatsu	National Route 459 / Fukushima Prefecture Route 355 (Sukagawa Nihonmatsu Route)	
Fukushima	Fukushima	244.7	152.0	20-1 / PA	Fukushima-Matsukawa	Fukushima Prefecture Route 52 (Tsuchiyu Onsen Route)	Smart interchange; service area is open to all traffic
Fukushima	Fukushima	247.0– 247.9	153.5– 154.0	Fukushima Tunnel			
Fukushima	Fukushima	254.9	158.4	21	Fukushima-nishi	National Route 115 (Fukushima-nishi Bypass)	
Fukushima	Fukushima	256.3– 256.5	159.3– 159.4	Arakawa Bridge over the Arakawa River			
Fukushima	Fukushima	257.7	160.1	PA	Azuma		
Fukushima	Fukushima	261.7	162.6	21-1	Fukushima	Tōhoku-Chūō Expressway north	Southern terminus of E13 concurrency
Fukushima	Fukushima	264.9	164.6	21	Fukushima-Iizaka	National Route 13	
Fukushima	Koori	269.4	167.4	22-1	Koori	Tōhoku-Chūō Expressway south	Northern terminus of E13 concurrency
Fukushima	Kunimi	276.0	171.5	23	Kunimi	Fukushima Prefecture Route 46 (Shiroishi-Kunimi Route)	
Fukushima	Kunimi	281.9	175.2	SA	Kunimi		
Miyagi	Shiroishi	299.5	186.1	24	Shiroishi	National Route 4 (Shiroishi Bypass)	
Miyagi	Zaō	304.1	189.0	PA	Zaō		
Miyagi	Murata	311.8	193.7	25	Murata	Miyagi Prefecture Route 14 (Watari Ōgawara Kawasaki Route)	
Miyagi	Murata	314.5	195.4	26	Murata	Yamagata Expressway west	Southern terminus of E48 concurrency
Miyagi	Murata	319.6	198.6	26-1 / PA	Sugō		Smart interchange to open in 2020; parking area is open to all traffic
Miyagi	Taihaku-ku, Sendai	326.8	203.1	27	Sendai-minami	Sendai-Nanbu Road east National Route 286	Northern terminus of E48 concurrency
Miyagi	Aoba-ku, Sendai	332.4	206.5	28	Sendai-Miyagi	National Route 48 (Ayashi Bypass / Sendai Nishi Road)	
Miyagi	Aoba-ku, Sendai	333.3– 333.6	207.1– 207.3	Hirosegawa Bridge over the Hirose River			
Miyagi	Izumi-ku, Sendai	342.6	212.9	28-1 / PA	Izumi	Miyagi Prefecture Route 35 (Izumi-Shiogama Route)	Smart interchange; parking area is open to all traffic
Miyagi	Izumi-ku, Sendai	346.1	215.1	29	Izumi	National Route 4	
Miyagi	Tomiya	349.3	217.0	29-1	Tomiya	Sendai-Hokubu Road	No exit to westbound E6, no entrance from eastbound E6
Miyagi	Taiwa	354.4	220.2	PA	Tsurusu		
Miyagi	Taiwa	357.1	221.9	30	Taiwa	Miyagi Prefecture Route 3 (Shiogama-Yoshioka Route)	
Miyagi	Ōhira	360.3	223.9	30-1	Ōhira	Miyagi Prefecture Route 3 (Ōhira-Ochiai Route)	
Miyagi	Ōsaki	366.8	227.9	30-2 / PA	Sanbongi	National Route 4 (Sanbongi Bypass)	Smart interchange; parking area is open to all traffic
Miyagi	Ōsaki	367.1– 367.6	228.1– 228.4	Narusegawa Bridge over National Route 4 and the Naruse River			
Miyagi	Ōsaki	375.1	233.1	31	Furukawa	National Route 47	
Miyagi	Ōsaki	381.0	236.7	31-1 / SA	Chōjahara	Miyagi Prefecture Route 266 (Kejonuma Park Route)	Smart interchange; service area is open to all traffic, a dog run is available for users of the expressway
Miyagi	Kurihara	391.2	243.1	32	Tsukidate	National Route 4	
Miyagi	Kurihara			32-1	Kurihara	Miyagi-Kenpoku Road	Planned interchange
Miyagi	Kurihara	396.8	246.6	PA	Shiwahime		
Miyagi	Kurihara	403.0	250.4	33	Wakayanagi-Kannari	Miyagi Prefecture Route 4 (Nakada-Kurikoma Route)	
Miyagi	Kurihara	408.8	254.0	PA	Kannari		
Iwate	Ichinoseki	420.3	261.2	34	Ichinoseki	National Route 342	
Iwate	Ichinoseki	421.3– 422.3	261.8– 262.4	Ichinoseki Tunnel			
Iwate	Ichinoseki	424.4	263.7	PA	Chūsonji		Southbound access only
Iwate	Ichinoseki	424.6	263.8	34-1	Hiraizumi		Future smart interchange
Iwate	Hiraizumi	425.5	264.4	PA	Chūsonji		Northbound access only
Iwate	Hiraizumi	426.3– 427.4	264.9– 265.6	Hiraizumi Tunnel			
Iwate	Hiraizumi	431.8	268.3	35	Hiraizumi-Maesawa	National Route 4	
Iwate	Ōshū	437.5	271.8	SA	Maesawa		
Iwate	Ōshū	442.7	275.1	35-1	Ōshū	Iwate Prefecture Route 236 (Koromogawa-Mizusawa Route)	Smart interchange
Iwate	Ōshū	449.3	279.2	36	Mizusawa	National Route 4 (Kanegasaki Bypass)	
Iwate	Kitakami	458.0	284.6	36-1 / PA	Kitakami-Kanegasaki	Iwate Prefecture Route 50 (Kitakami-Kanegasaki Inter Route)	
Iwate	Kitakami	461.8	286.9	37	Kitakami	Akita Expressway north	Southern terminus of E46 concurrency
Iwate	Kitakami	464.7	288.8	38	Kitakami-Ezuriko	National Route 107	
Iwate	Hanamaki	472.6	293.7	PA	Hanamaki		Planned smart interchange
Iwate	Hanamaki	474.5	294.8	38-1	Hanamaki-minami	Iwate Prefecture Route 12 (Hanamaki-Ōmagari Route)	
Iwate	Hanamaki	478.6	297.4	38-2	Hanamaki	Kamaishi Expressway east	Northern terminus of E46 concurrency
Iwate	Hanamaki	481.3	299.1	39	Hanamaki	Iwate Prefecture Route 37 (Hanamaki Koromogawa Route)	
Iwate	Shiwa	489.2	304.0	SA	Shiwa	Iwate Prefecture Route 50 (Kitakami-Kanegasaki Inter Route)	
Iwate	Shiwa	494.1	307.0	39	Shiwa	Iwate Prefecture Route 46 (Shiwa Inter Route)	
Iwate	Yahaba	501.3	311.5	40-1 / PA	Yahaba	Iwate Prefecture Route 120 (Fudō-Morioka Route)	
Iwate	Morioka	505.1	313.9	41	Morioka-minami	Iwate Prefecture Route 36 (Kamiyonai-Yuzawa Route)	
Iwate	Morioka	511.2– 511.7	317.6– 318.0	Shizukuishigawa Bridge over the Shizukuishi River			
Iwate	Morioka	512.1	318.2	42	Morioka	National Route 46	
Iwate	Takizawa	516.1	320.7	42-1	Takizawa-chūō		Smart interchange
Iwate	Takizawa	520.1	323.2	PA	Takizawa		
Iwate	Takizawa	522.1	324.4	43	Takizawa	National Route 4 / National Route 281 (unsigned)	
Iwate	Hachimantai	532.2	330.7	44	Nishine	National Route 282	
Iwate	Hachimantai	537.3	333.9	SA	Iwatesan		Last gas station travelling northbound on the expressway
Iwate	Hachimantai	541.7	336.6	45	Matsuo-Hachimantai	Iwate Prefecture Route 45 (Kashiwadai-Matsuo Route)	
Iwate	Hachimantai	544.2	338.2	PA	Maemoriyama		
Iwate	Hachimantai	549.0– 550.9	341.1– 342.3	Ryūgamori Tunnel			
Iwate	Hachimantai	556.6	345.9	PA	Hata		
Iwate	Hachimantai	563.3	350.0	46	Ashiro	Hachinohe Expressway north	
Iwate	Hachimantai	564.6	350.8	47	Ashiro	National Route 282	
Iwate	Hachimantai	573.2	356.2	PA	Tayama		
Iwate	Hachimantai	574.9– 575.1	357.2– 357.4	Tayama Tunnel			
Akita	Kazuno	585.2	363.6	PA	Yuze		
Akita	Kazuno	590.7	367.0	48	Kazuno-Hachimantai	National Route 282	
Akita	Kazuno	593.7	368.9	SA	Hanawa		
Akita	Kazuno	602.6	374.4	49	Towada	National Route 103 / National Route 104 (unsigned) / National Route 285 (unsigned)	
Akita	Kosaka	608.5– 609.8	378.1– 378.9	Kamedayama Tunnel			
Akita	Kosaka	610.7	379.5	49-1	Kosaka	Akita Prefecture Route 2 (Ōdate-Lake Towada Route)	
Akita	Kosaka	613.5	381.2	PA	Kosaka		
Akita	Kosaka	617.0	383.4	49-2	Kosaka	Akita Expressway south	
Akita–Aomori prefecture border		620.1 624.4	385.3 388.0	Sakanashi Tunnel			
Aomori	Hirakawa	630.7	391.9	50	Ikarigaseki	National Route 7	
Aomori	Ōwani	635.8	395.1	PA	Ajara		
Aomori	Ōwani	643.7	400.0	51	Ōwani-Hirosaki	National Route 7	
Aomori	Hirakawa	646.5	401.7	SA	Tsugaru		
Aomori	Kuroishi	653.6	406.1	52	Kuroishi	National Route 102 / National Route 394	
Aomori	Kuroishi	660.8	410.6	PA	Takadate		
Aomori	Aomori	667.6	414.8	53	Namioka	Tsugaru Expressway west National Route 7 Aomori Prefecture Route 285 (Namioka-Fujisaki Route)	
Aomori	Aomori	677.4– 679.5	420.9– 422.2	54 / TB	Aomori	Aomori Expressway east National Route 7 (Aomori Belt Highway)	Northern terminus; no access between E4A and National Route 7
1.000 mi = 1.609 km; 1.000 km = 0.621 mi: Concurrency terminus; Electronic toll collection; Incomplete access; Route transition; Unopened
