= E6 series =

E6 series may refer to:

- E6 series (preferred numbers), a series of standardized resistor and capacitor values
- E6 series (train), a Japanese Shinkansen train since 2013

== See also ==
- E6 (disambiguation)
