= Advanced economy =

IMF classification

World map of 'advanced economies' based on the IMF's World Economic Outlook report, October 2026.

Advanced economy is a classification used by the International Monetary Fund (IMF) in its World Economic Outlook (WEO) to group countries with relatively high levels of economic development. The IMF classifies countries based on factors such as high gross domestic product (GDP) per capita, export diversification, and integration into the global financial system.

== Definitions and use of term ==
Various organizations, including the Central Intelligence Agency (CIA) and global index providers such as MSCI and FTSE Russell, use their own methodologies to classify economies as "developed" or "advanced". These may incorporate additional measures such as market accessibility, institutional quality, and financial market maturity. Consequently, advanced economies are generally distinguished from emerging and developing economies not only by income levels, but also by the complexity, diversification, and stability of their economic systems. The IMF maintains this classification primarily for analytical purposes, and some high-income economies may still be categorized as emerging due to limited diversification (particularly those heavily dependent on a single sector, such as oil exports).

As of October 2026, 43 economies are classified as advanced. These include major global economies such as the United States, Japan, and Germany, as well as smaller or highly specialized economies such as Singapore, the Republic of Ireland, and New Zealand.

== List ==
According to the October 2026 edition of the World Economic Outlook, the following 43 economies are classified as advanced:

- Andorra
- Australia
- Austria
- Belgium
- Bulgaria
- Canada
- Croatia
- Cyprus
- Czech Republic
- Denmark
- Estonia
- Finland
- France
- Germany
- Greece
- Hong Kong
- Iceland
- (Republic of Ireland) Ireland
- Israel
- Italy
- Japan
- South Korea
- Latvia
- Lithuania
- Liechtenstein
- Luxembourg
- Macau
- Malta
- Netherlands
- New Zealand
- Norway
- Portugal
- Puerto Rico
- San Marino
- Singapore
- Slovakia
- Slovenia
- Spain
- Sweden
- Switzerland
- Taiwan
- United Kingdom
- United States

== See also ==
- Developed country
- Developed market
- Developing country
- Emerging market
- Least developed countries
- Global North and Global South
