= 6E =

6E or 6-E can refer to:

- "6e", meaning "6th" ("sixth") in Afrikaans, Dutch, and French

== France–related topics ==
- Paris 6e (or 6e arrondissement), the 6th arrondissement of Paris

=== Military units ===
- 6e RG, abbreviation for 6th Engineer Regiment (France)
- 6e-12e Régiment de Cuirassiers, or 6th-12th Cuirassier Regiment
- 6e Régiment de Parachutistes d'Infanterie de Marine, or 6th Marine Infantry Parachute Regiment
- 6e division légère blindée, or 6th Light Armoured Brigade (France)

== Geography ==
- 6th meridian east

== People ==
- Jean II, 6e Duc de Bourbon, or John II, Duke of Bourbon
- Louis III, 6e Prince de, Duc de Bourbon Conde, or Louis III, Prince of Condé
- Paul de Noallies, 6e duc de Noailles, or Paul de Noailles, 6th Duke of Noailles
- Maurice de Broglie, 6e Duc de Broglie, or Maurice de Broglie, 6th Duke of Broglie

== Science and technology ==
- Category 6e cable, a marketing term for a type of Category 6 cable
- Wi-Fi 6E, a subset of the Wi-Fi 6 standard

== Travel ==
- 6E, IATA code for IndiGo, an Indian airline

== Vehicles ==
- A-6E, a model of Grumman A-6 Intruder
- South African Class 6E, a locomotive
- Schleicher K 6E, a model of Schleicher Ka 6
- Mazda 6e, an electric midsize car

== Works of fiction ==
- 6E, the production code for the 1983 Doctor Who serial Arc of Infinity
- "Dungeons & Dragons 2024", a backwards-compatible update of Dungeons & Dragons 5th edition, sometimes given the nickname "D&D 6e"

== See also ==
- E6 (disambiguation)
