= Sendai-Nanbu Road =

Road in Miyagi Prefecture, Japan

Sendai-Nanbu Road
- 仙台南部道路

Route information
- Maintained by East Nippon Expressway Company
- Length: 24.8 km (15.4 mi)
- Existed: 1981–present
- Component highways: National Route 6

Major junctions
- West end: Sendai-minami Interchange; Tōhoku Expressway in Taihaku-ku, Sendai
- East end: Sendai-Wakabayashi Junction; Sendai-Tōbu Road in Wakabayashi-ku, Sendai

Location
- Country: Japan

Highway system
- National highways of Japan; Expressways of Japan

The Sendai-Nanbu Road (仙台南部道路, Sendai-Nanbu Dōro) is a toll road in Sendai, Miyagi Prefecture, Japan. It is owned and operated by the East Nippon Expressway Company (NEXCO East Japan). Along with the Sanriku Expressway, Sendai-Hokubu Road, Sendai-Tōbu Road, and Tōhoku Expressway it forms a ring road around the city, Sendai, known as the "Gurutto Sendai". The route is signed E48 under Ministry of Land, Infrastructure, Transport and Tourism's "2016 Proposal for Realization of Expressway Numbering."

== History ==
The Sendai-Nanbu Road was originally built in phases between 1981 and 2001 by the Miyagi Prefecture Road Corporation.

On 1 July 2013, the Miyagi Prefecture Road Corporation transferred ownership and the tolling of the road to NEXCO East Japan.

== Junction list ==
The entire expressway is in Miyagi Prefecture.

Location	km	mi	Exit	Name	Destinations	Notes
Wakabayashi-ku, Sendai	0	0.0	50	Sendai-Wakabayashi	Sendai-Tōbu Road – to Sanriku Expressway, Jōban Expressway, Ishinomaki, Iwaki, Fukushima	
Wakabayashi-ku, Sendai	1.2	0.75	51	Imaizumi	Miyagi Prefecture Route 54	
Taihaku-ku, Sendai	3.7	2.3	52	Nagamachi	National Route 4 (Sendai Bypass)	
Taihaku-ku, Sendai	9.1	5.7	53	Yamada	National Route 286	Westbound exit, eastbound entrance
Taihaku-ku, Sendai	12.2	7.6	27	Sendai-minami	Tōhoku Expressway – to Yamagata Expressway, Fukushima, Tokyo, Morioka, Aomori	Northern end of E48 concurrency with the Tōhoku Expressway
1.000 mi = 1.609 km; 1.000 km = 0.621 mi: Concurrency terminus; Incomplete access

== See also ==
- Japan National Route 6
