= Tomiya =

City in Miyagi Prefecture, Japan

Tomiya 富谷市
- City
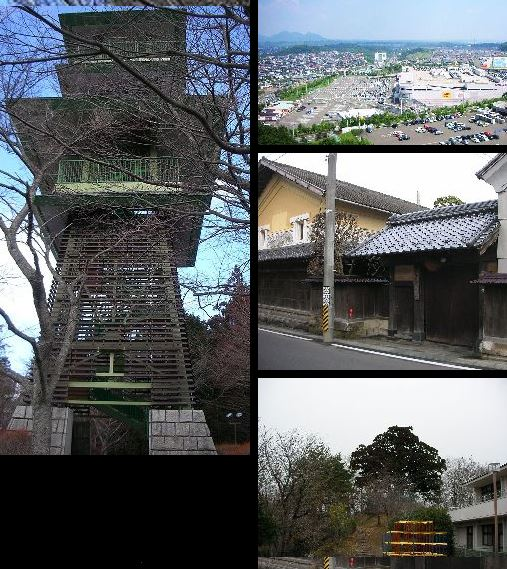
- Left: Okameyama Shinrin Park; Right: View from Symphony Tower, Uchigasaki Shozo, Kame Sugi

- Flag Seal

- Location of Tomiya in Miyagi Prefecture

- Coordinates: 38°24′N 140°53′E
- Country: Japan
- Region: Tōhoku
- Prefecture: Miyagi

Area
  - Total: 49.18 km^{2} (18.99 sq mi)

Population (May 31, 2020)
  - Total: 52,433
  - Density: 1,066/km^{2} (2,761/sq mi)
- Time zone: UTC+9 (Japan Standard Time)
- Tree: Pine
- Flower: Chrysanthemum
- Phone number: 022-345-1111
- Address: 30 Tomiyasaka Matsuda, Tomiya-shi, Miyagi-ken 981-3392
- Website: Official website

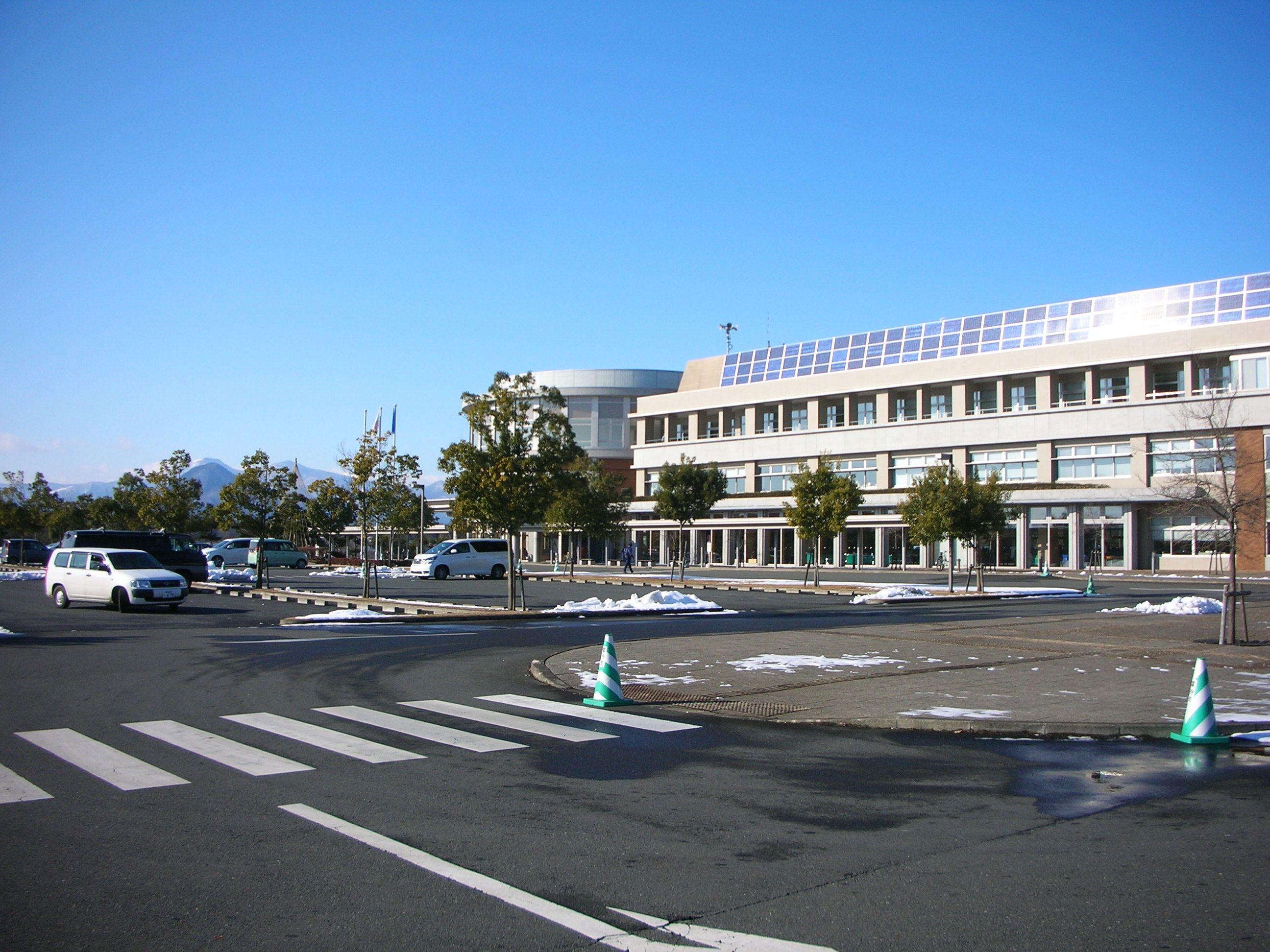
Tomiya City Hall

Tomiya (富谷市, Tomiya-shi) is a city located in central Miyagi Prefecture, Japan. As of 31 May 2020, the city had an estimated population of 52,433, and a population density of 1,100 persons per km^{2} in 19,535 households. The total area of the city is 49.18 square kilometres (18.99 sq mi).

== Geography ==
Tomiya is located in central Miyagi Prefecture, bordered by the Sendai metropolitan area to the south.

=== Neighboring municipalities ===
Miyagi Prefecture

- Rifu
- Sendai
- Taiwa

=== Climate ===
The city has a climate characterized by cool summers and long cold winters (Köppen climate classification Cfa). The average annual temperature in Tomiya is 12.1 °C. The average annual rainfall is 1251 mm with September as the wettest month. The temperatures are highest on average in August, at around 24.8 °C, and lowest in January, at around 0.6 °C.

== Demographics ==
Per Japanese census data, the population of Tomiya has expanded rapidly over the past 50 years.

Historical population
| Year | Pop. | ±% |
|---|---|---|
| 1970 | 4,912 | — |
| 1980 | 13,930 | +183.6% |
| 1990 | 24,611 | +76.7% |
| 2000 | 35,909 | +45.9% |
| 2010 | 47,042 | +31.0% |
| 2020 | 51,651 | +9.8% |

== History ==
The area of present-day Tomiya was part of ancient Mutsu Province, and has been settled since at least the Jōmon period by the Emishi people. During later portion of the Heian period, the area was ruled by the Northern Fujiwara. During the Sengoku period, the area was contested by various samurai clans before the area came under the control of the Date clan of Sendai Domain during the Edo period, under the Tokugawa shogunate. During the Edo period, Tomiya was a post town on the Ōshū Kaidō highway connecting Edo with northern Japan.

The village of Tomiya was created on April 1, 1889 with the post-Meiji restoration establishment of the modern municipalities system. It was raised to town status on April 1, 1963 and raised to city status on October 10, 2016.

== Government ==
Tomiya operates under a mayor-council form of government, wherein the mayor is directly elected by residents. The city also has a unicameral city legislature composed of 20 members. This system ensures local governance and decision-making tailored to the needs of Tomiya's residents.

At the prefectural level, Tomiya and the surrounding Kurokawa District collectively elect two representatives to the Miyagi Prefectural Legislature. This partnership reflects the interconnected administrative responsibilities shared between the city and its neighboring district.

On a national level, Tomiya is part of the Miyagi 4th district for Japan's House of Representatives, the lower house of the National Diet of Japan. This district representation plays a vital role in ensuring Tomiya's interests are voiced in national legislative matters.

== Economy ==
Tomiya has a mixed economy with five industrial parks, but is also noted for its production of blueberries and bean sprouts. The city is also a bedroom community for the neighboring metropolis of Sendai.

== Education ==
Tomiya has eight public elementary schools and five public middle schools operated by the city government, and one public high school operated by the Miyagi Prefectural Board of Education. The prefectural also operations one special education school for the handicapped.

== Transportation ==
=== Railway ===
Tomiya does not have any passenger railway service.

=== Highway ===
- Tōhoku Expressway – Tomiya Junction
- Sendai-Hokubu Road – Tomiya Junction – Tomiya Interchange
- National Route 4

== Mascots ==
Tomiya has two mascots, Buruberi Musume (ブルベリッ娘, lit: Blueberry Girl) and Burupiyo (ブルピヨ). The characters where created in 2016, alongside the city's founding. Buruberi Musume is a girl and Burupiyos gender is unknown. Tomiya makes a lot of merchandise of the mascots, including stickers on the Japanese social media LINE.
