= Sendai-Tōbu Road =

Road in Miyagi Prefecture, Japan

Sendai-Tōbu Road
- 仙台東部道路

Route information
- Maintained by East Nippon Expressway Company
- Length: 24.8 km (15.4 mi)
- Existed: 1994–present
- Component highways: National Route 6

Major junctions
- South end: Watari Interchange; Jōban Expressway in Watari, Miyagi
- North end: Sendaiko-kita Interchange; Sanriku Expressway; National Route 45 in Sendai, Miyagi

Location
- Country: Japan

Highway system
- National highways of Japan; Expressways of Japan

The Sendai-Tōbu Road (仙台東部道路, Sendai-Tōbu Dōro) is a toll road in Miyagi Prefecture, Japan. It is owned and operated by the East Nippon Expressway Company (NEXCO East Japan). Along with the Sanriku Expressway, Sendai-Hokubu Road, Sendai-Nanbu Road, and Tōhoku Expressway the northern portion of the road forms a ring road around the city, Sendai, known as the "Gurutto Sendai". The route is signed E6 under Ministry of Land, Infrastructure, Transport and Tourism's "2016 Proposal for Realization of Expressway Numbering."

== Junction list ==
The entire expressway is in Miyagi Prefecture.

| Location | km | mi | Exit | Name | Destinations | Notes |
|---|---|---|---|---|---|---|
| Watari | 0.0 | 0.0 | 1 | Watari | Miyagi Prefecture Route 269; Jōban Expressway south | Southern terminus of the Sendai-Tōbu Road; E6 continues south along the Jōban Expressway |
| Iwanuma | 2.2 | 1.4 | 2 | Iwanuma | Miyagi Prefecture Route 125 (Iwanuma Kaihin Ryokuchi Route) | |
| Natori | 5.5 | 3.4 | 3 | Sendai Airport | Miyagi Prefecture Route 20 (Sendai Airport Route) | |
| Natori | 7.8 | 4.8 | 3-1 | Natori-chūō | Unnamed road – to National Route 4, Miyagi Prefecture Route 10 | Smart Interchange- ETC access only |
| Natori | 12.2 | 7.6 | 4 | Natori | Miyagi Prefecture Route 129 (Yuriagekō Route) | |
| Wakabayashi-ku, Sendai | 15.2 | 9.4 | 5 | Sendai-Wakabayashi | Sendai-Nanbu Road – to Tōhoku Expressway, Taihaku-ku, Sendai | |
| Wakabayashi-ku, Sendai | 19.6 | 12.2 | 6 | Sendai-higashi | Miyagi Prefecture Route 23 (Sendai Shiogama Route) | |
| Miyagino-ku, Sendai | 23.0 | 14.3 | 7 | Sendaikō | Miyagi Prefecture Route 10 (Shiogama Watari Route) | |
| Miyagino-ku, Sendai | 24.8 | 15.4 | 1 | Sendaikō-kita | National Route 45; Sanriku Expressway north | Northern terminus of the Sendai-Tōbu Road; E6 continues north along the Sanriku Expressway |
1.000 mi = 1.609 km; 1.000 km = 0.621 mi: Electronic toll collection; Route transition

== See also ==
- Japan National Route 6
