= Sakanashi Tunnel =

Road tunnel in Japan

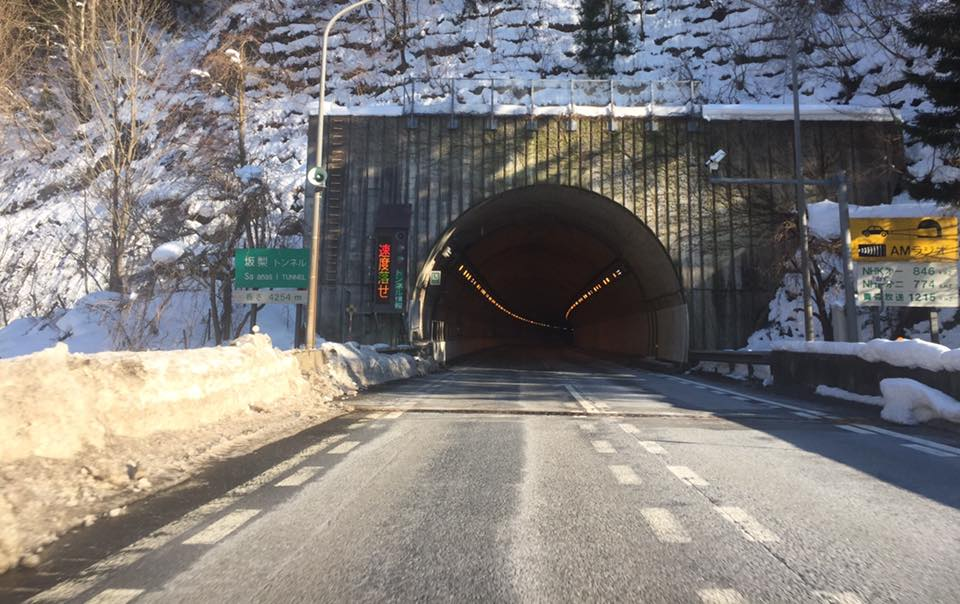
- The northern entrance to the Tokyo-bound side of the Sakanashi Tunnel

- Location within Aomori Prefecture Location within Japan

Overview
- Location: Approx. 58 km (36 mi) south of Aomori Interchange
- Coordinates: 40.412222°N 140.683361°E
- Route: Tōhoku Expressway
- Crosses: Sakanashi Pass and the border of Aomori and Akita Prefectures

Operation
- Opened: 30 July 1986
- Operator: East Nippon Expressway Company
- Character: Twin-bore tunnel

Technical
- Length: 4,254 m (13,957 ft) southbound 4,265 m (13,993 ft) northbound

The Sakanashi Tunnel (坂梨トンネル Sakanashi Tonneru) is a tunnel on the border of Akita Prefecture and Aomori Prefecture on the Tōhoku Expressway. The tunnel crosses Sakanashi Pass of the northern Ōu Mountain Range. Its 4.27-kilometer-long (2.65 mi) northbound tunnel is the longest tunnel on the Tōhoku Expressway. Its completion in 1986 was one of the final pieces of the 679.5 km (422.2 mi) Tōhoku Expressway from Tokyo to Aomori.

== Description ==
The northbound bore of the tunnel is 4.27 kilometers (2.65 mi) long while the southbound bore is 4.25 kilometers (2.64 mi) long. The northern end of the tunnel sits at 333.6 meters (1,094 ft) above sea level and the southern end sits at 322.2 meters (1,057 ft). The speed limit in the tunnel is set at 70 km/h. The tunnel is the longest on the Tōhoku Expressway.

=== Alternate route ===
Prior to the opening of the tunnel the primary high-speed route from Morioka to Aomori was the Michinoku Toll Road. That route is currently being extended to relieve National Route 4 and the Tōhoku Expressway of traffic from Hachinohe to Aomori, via the Hachinohe Expressway, Second Michinoku Toll Road, and Kamikita Expressway. National Route 282 runs parallel to the tunnel, but winds through the mountain pass.

== History ==
The Sakanahi Tunnel opened on 30 July 1986. This allowed the expressway to open between Kazuno, Akita and Hirakawa, Aomori.
