= Miyagi-Kenpoku Road =

Highway in Japan

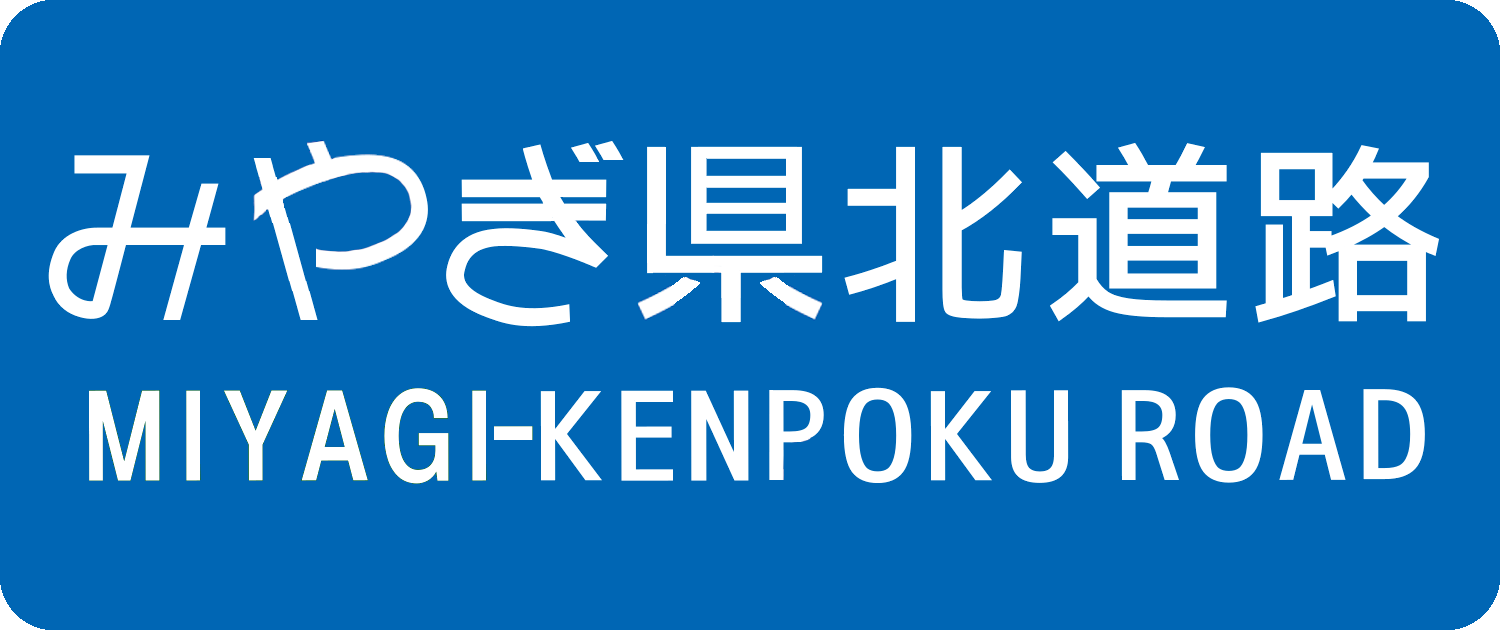
Miyagi-Kenpoku Road
- 国道%route%号
- みやぎ県北高速幹線道路 (Miyagi-Kenpoku Kōsokukansenōro)

Route information
- Maintained by Miyagi Prefecture
- Length: 24 km (15 mi)
- Existed: 2011–present
- Component highways: Miyagi Prefecture Route 36

Major junctions
- West end: National Route 4 in Kurihara
- East end: Sanriku Expressway in Tome

Location
- Country: Japan

Highway system
- National highways of Japan; Expressways of Japan

The Miyagi-Kenpoku Road (みやぎ県北高速幹線道路 Miyagi-Kenpoku Kōsokukansenōro) is an incomplete Regional High-Standard Highway in Miyagi Prefecture connecting the cities Kurihara and Tome. It serves as an arterial highway between the Tōhoku Expressway and Sanriku Expressway in the northern part of the prefecture. The road is managed by Miyagi Prefecture.

== History ==
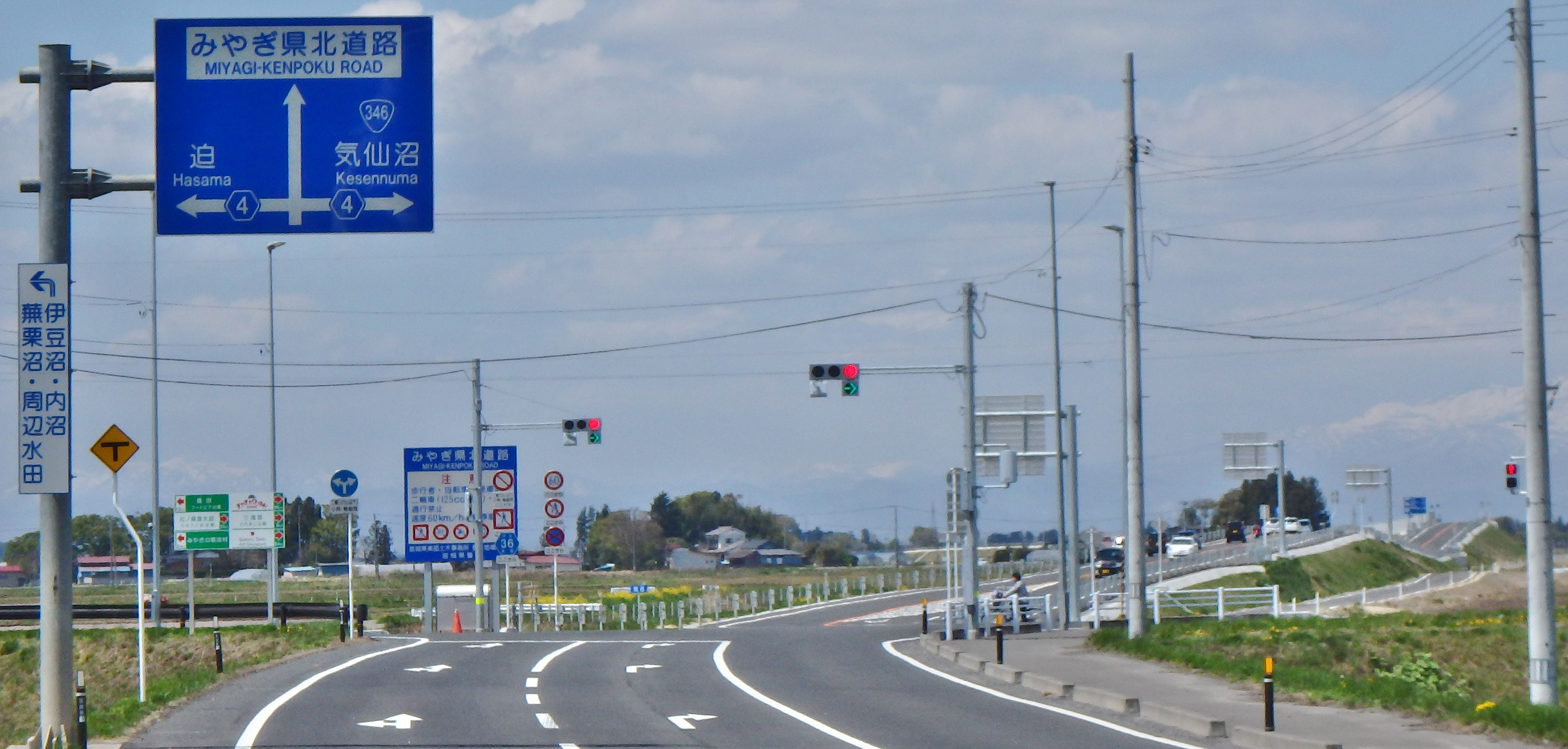
Miyagi-Kenpoku Road facing west near its eastern terminus in Tome

The first section of the Miyagi-Kenpoku Road was originally scheduled to be opened on 17 March 2011; however, the opening was postponed due to the 2011 Tōhoku earthquake and tsunami. The section was instead opened on 24 November 2011. After the area was devastated by the earthquake and tsunami, priority was given to completing the road as a link from the Tōhoku Expressway to the disaster area. Construction is still underway as it does not yet connect directly to the Tōhoku Expressway.

== Junction list ==
The entire highway is in Miyagi Prefecture.

Location	km	mi	Exit	Name	Destinations	Notes
Kurihara	0	0.0	—		National Route 4 (Tsukidate Bypass)	Western terminus; at-grade intersection
Kurihara			—	Kurihara	Tōhoku Expressway	E4 exit 32-1
Kurihara	1.7	1.1	—	Tsukidate-higashi	Miyagi Prefecture Route 36	Eastbound entrance, westbound exit
Kurihara	4.8	3.0	—	Izunuma	Miyagi Prefecture Route 268	
Kurihara	8.7	5.4	—	Wakayanagi-minami	Miyagi Prefecture Route 176	
Kurihara	10.6	6.6	—		National Route 398	At-grade intersection
8.1 km gap in the highway, connection is made by National Route 346 / National Route 398
Tome	18.7	11.6	—	Sanuma	National Route 346	
Tome	20.5	12.7	—	Nakada	Tome-Soyokaze Line	
Tome	23.4	14.5	—	Tome-Nakada	Miyagi Prefecture Route 4	At-grade intersection
Tome	23.9	14.9	—	Tome-Nakada	Sanriku Expressway	Eastern terminus; E45 exit 15
1.000 mi = 1.609 km; 1.000 km = 0.621 mi: Incomplete access; Unopened
