= Kawaguchi Route =

Kawaguchi Route

Route information
- Maintained by Metropolitan Expressway Company Limited
- Length: 12.2 km (7.6 mi)
- Existed: 1987–present

Major junctions
- South end: Kōhoku Junction in Adachi, Tokyo; Central Circular Route (Shuto Expressway)
- North end: Kawaguchi Junction in Kawaguchi, Saitama; Tokyo Gaikan Expressway; Tōhoku Expressway

Location
- Country: Japan

Highway system
- National highways of Japan; Expressways of Japan

The Kawaguchi Route (川口線, Kawaguchi-sen), signed as Route S1, is one of the routes of the Shuto Expressway system serving the Greater Tokyo Area. The route is a 12.2-kilometer (7.6 mi) long radial highway running north from Adachi, Tokyo to Kawaguchi, Saitama. It primarily connects central Tokyo to the Tōhoku Expressway and points further north such as Sendai and Aomori.

== Route description ==
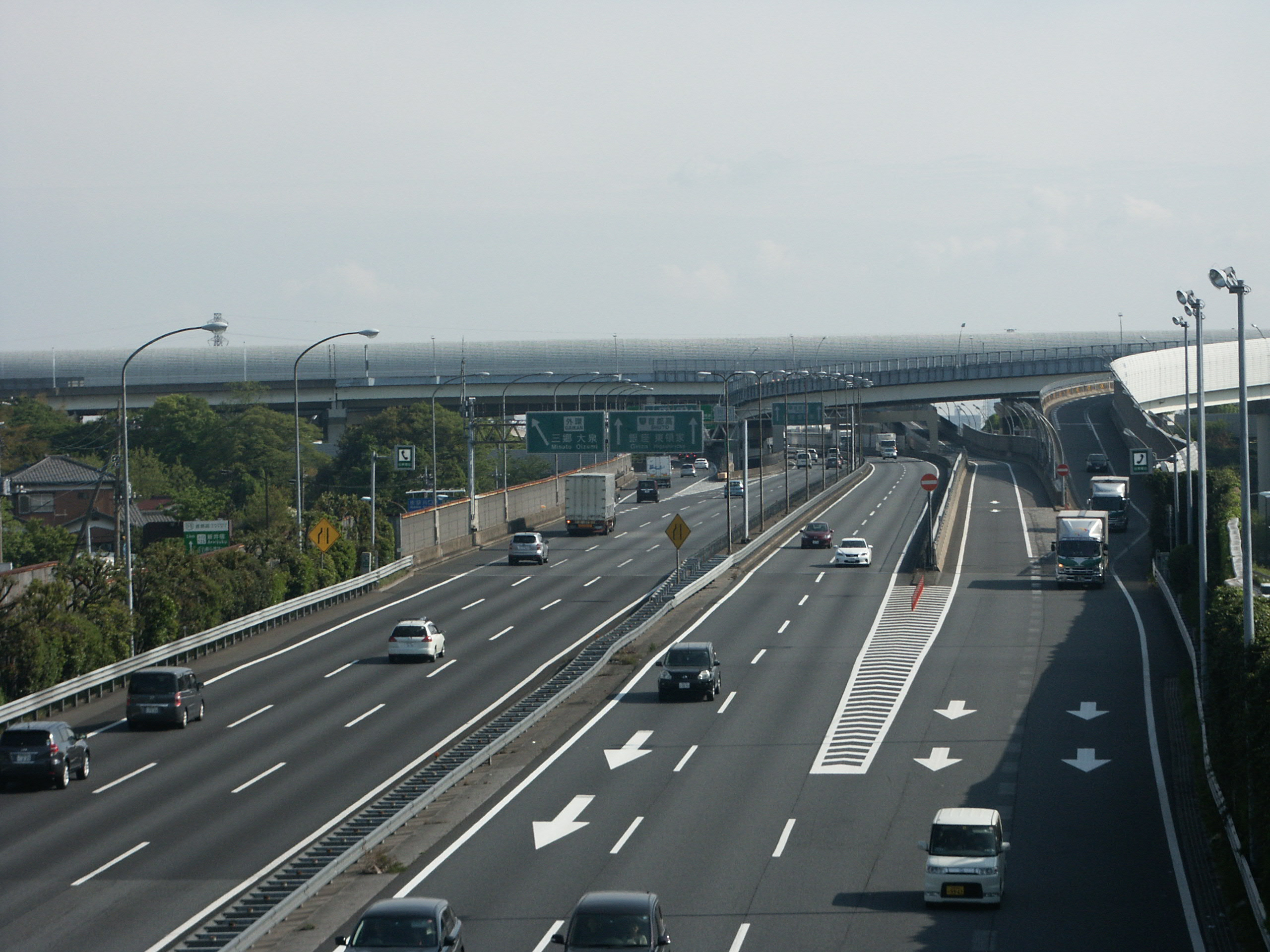
The northern terminus of the Kawaguchi Route at Kawaguchi Junction facing south

The speed limit is 60 km/h for the first 4 kilometers (2.5 mi) of the route between Kōhoku Junction and the Kaga exit and entrance. From the Kaga exit and entrance north to Kawaguchi Junction the speed limit is 80 km/h.

== History ==
The Kawaguchi Route was opened on 9 September 1987 alongside a section of the Central Circular Route. Upon opening, the expressway formed the first of many links between the expressways of northern Honshu to the expressways of the rest of the island and Kyushu. On 25 December 2002 access at Kōhoku Junction was extended to westbound traffic on the Central Circular Route.

On 20 July 2008, a project was completed on the Kawaguchi Parking Area to give its facilities a face-lift, add greenery, and to increase the size of its parking lot.

== Junction list ==
PA= Parking area, TB= Toll booth

Prefecture	Location	km	mi	Exit	Name	Destinations	Notes
Tokyo	Adachi	0.0	0.0	—	Kōhoku	Central Circular Route (Shuto Expressway) – Ginza, Shinjuku	Southern terminus
Tokyo	Adachi	1.4	0.87	S01	Shikahama Bridge	Tokyo Metropolitan Route 107	Full access to and from northbound traffic; no access to southbound traffic
Tokyo	Adachi	1.4	0.87	S02	Shikahama Bridge	Tokyo Metropolitan Route 318 (Kanana-dori)	Access only from northbound traffic to Route 318
Saitama Prefecture	Kawaguchi	3.7	2.3	S04	Higashi-Ryoke	Saitama Prefecture Route 107 (Kan-nana-dori)	Southbound exit only
Tokyo	Adachi	4.0	2.5	S05	Kaga	Tokyo/Saitama Route 239 (Adachi-Kawaguchi Route)	Southbound entrance; northbound exit
Tokyo	Adachi	6.0	3.7	S06	Adachi-iriya	Tokyo/Saitama Route 106 (Tokyo Hatogaya Route) / Tokyo/Saitama Route 239 (Adachi-Kawaguchi Route)	Southbound exit; northbound entrance
Saitama	Kawaguchi	6.8	4.2	S07	Shingō	Saitama Prefecture Route 58 (Taitō-Kawaguchi Route) / Saitama Prefecture Route 239 (Adachi-Kawaguchi Route)	Southbound entrance; northbound exit
Saitama	Kawaguchi	7.8	4.8	S08	Shingō	Saitama Prefecture Route 58 (Taitō-Kawaguchi Route) / Saitama Prefecture Route 239 (Adachi-Kawaguchi Route)	Southbound exit; northbound entrance
Saitama	Kawaguchi	8.7	5.4	S09	Angyō	Saitama Prefecture Route 239 (Adachi-Kawaguchi Route)	Southbound entrance; northbound exit
Saitama	Kawaguchi	10.6	6.6	PA	Kawaguchi		Accessible only by southbound traffic
Saitama	Kawaguchi	10.7	6.6	TB	Kawaguchi		Southbound traffic only
Saitama	Kawaguchi	11.1	6.9	S11	Araijuku	Saitama Prefecture Route 239 (Adachi-Kawaguchi Route) to – National Route 122 / National Route 298	Southbound entrance; northbound exit
Saitama	Kawaguchi	12.2	7.6	—	Kawaguchi	Tokyo Gaikan Expressway; Tōhoku Expressway north – Ōizumi, Misato	Northern terminus; expressway continues as the Tōhoku Expressway
1.000 mi = 1.609 km; 1.000 km = 0.621 mi: Incomplete access; Route transition
