= Sendai-Hokubu Road =

Toll road in Miyagi Prefecture, Japan

Sendai-Hokubu Road
- 仙台北部道路

Route information
- Maintained by East Nippon Expressway Company
- Length: 13.5 km (8.4 mi)
- Existed: 2002–present
- Component highways: National Route 47

Major junctions
- East end: Rifu Junction; Sanriku Expressway in Rifu, Miyagi
- West end: Tomiya Interchange/Junction; Tōhoku Expressway; National Route 4 in Tomiya, Miyagi

Location
- Country: Japan

Highway system
- National highways of Japan; Expressways of Japan

The Sendai-Hokubu Road (仙台北部道路, Sendai-Hokubu Dōro) is a toll road in Miyagi Prefecture, Japan. It is owned and operated by the East Nippon Expressway Company (NEXCO East Japan). Along with the Sanriku Expressway, Sendai-Tōbu Road, Sendai-Nanbu Road, and Tōhoku Expressway it forms a ring road around the city, Sendai, known as the "Gurutto Sendai". The route is signed E6 under Ministry of Land, Infrastructure, Transport and Tourism's "2016 Proposal for Realization of Expressway Numbering."

== History ==
The first section of Sendai-Hokubu Road to open was the 5.2-kilometer-long (3.2 mi) section between the road's eastern terminus at the Sanriku Expressway and Rifu-Shirakashidai Interchange on 19 May 2002. At the time, there was no access to the northbound lanes of the Sanriku Expressway and from the southbound lanes to eastbound Sendai-Hokubu Road, this has since been fixed. The toll road was damaged on 11 March 2011 during the 2011 Tōhoku earthquake and tsunami. Inspections after the disaster showed that the road had sunken in places due to soil liquefaction. The damage was repaired within the two weeks after the event.

== Junction list ==
The entire expressway is in Miyagi Prefecture.

Location	km	mi	Exit	Name	Destinations	Notes
Rifu	0.0	0.0	2	Rifu	Sanriku Expressway – Matsushima, Ishinomaki, Sendai Airport, Sōma, Fukushima	Southern terminus of E45 and the Sendai-Hokubu Road; E6 continues south along the Sanriku Expressway
Rifu	5.2	3.2	1	Rifu-Shirakashidai	Miyagi Prefecture Route 3 (Shiogama-Yoshioka Route)	
Tomiya	11.8	7.3	29-1	Tomiya	Tōhoku Expressway – Morioka, Aomori, Fukushima, Tokyo	No access from eastbound Sendai-Hokubu Road to Tōhoku Expressway, no access from Tōhoku Expressway to westbound Sendai-Hokubu Road
Tomiya	13.5	8.4	2	Tomiya	National Route 4 (Ōshū Kaidō)	Northern terminus; at-grade junction
1.000 mi = 1.609 km; 1.000 km = 0.621 mi: Incomplete access; Route transition

== See also ==
- Japan National Route 47
