= Fukushima Tunnel =

Railway tunnel in Honshu, Japan

Fukushima Railway Tunnel
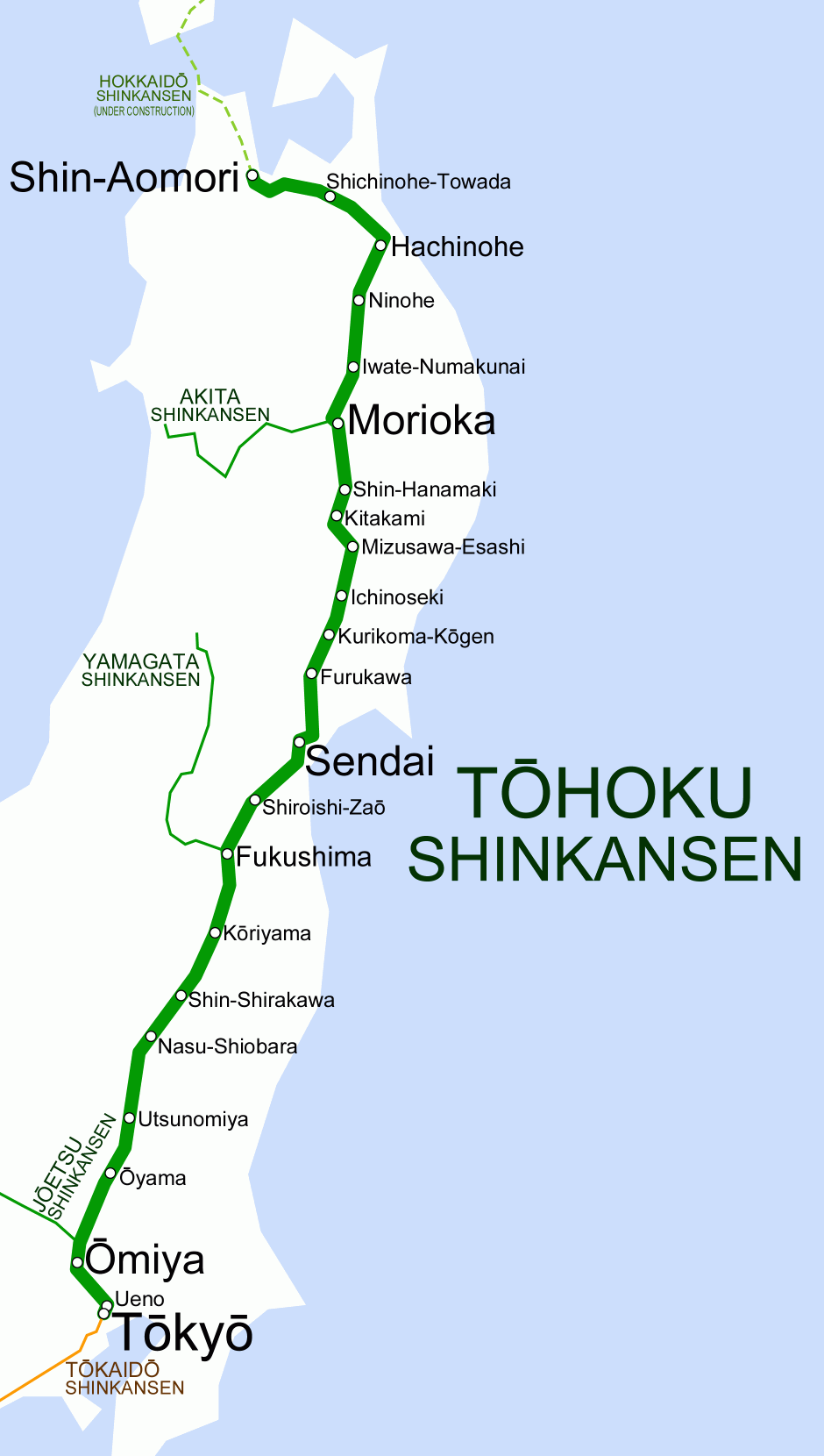
- Fukushima tunnel on Tohoku Shinkansen line
- Interactive map of Fukushima Railway Tunnel

Overview
- Line: Tōhoku Shinkansen
- Location: between Adachi Station and Minami-Fukushima Station
- Coordinates: 37°40′59.361″N 140°27′46.1514″E
- Status: active

Operation
- Opened: 1982
- Owner: East Japan Railway Company (JR East)
- Operator: East Japan Railway Company
- Traffic: Railway
- Character: Passenger and Freight

Technical
- Line length: 11,705 m (38,402 ft)
- No. of tracks: 2
- Track gauge: 1,435 mm ( standard gauge )

Fukushima Tunnel (福島トンネル, Fukushima tonneru) is a tunnel on Tōhoku Shinkansen that runs from Adachi Station in Nihonmatsu city to Minami-Fukushima Station in Fukushima city, Fukushima prefecture with total length of 11.705 m. It was built and completed in 1982.

== See also ==
- List of tunnels in Japan
- Seikan Tunnel undersea tunnel between Honshu-Hokkaido islands
- Kanmon Railway Tunnel undersea tunnel between Honshu-Kyushu islands
- Sakhalin–Hokkaido Tunnel
- Bohai Strait tunnel
