= Ichinoseki Tunnel =

Railway tunnel in Honshu, Japan

Ichinoseki Railway Tunnel
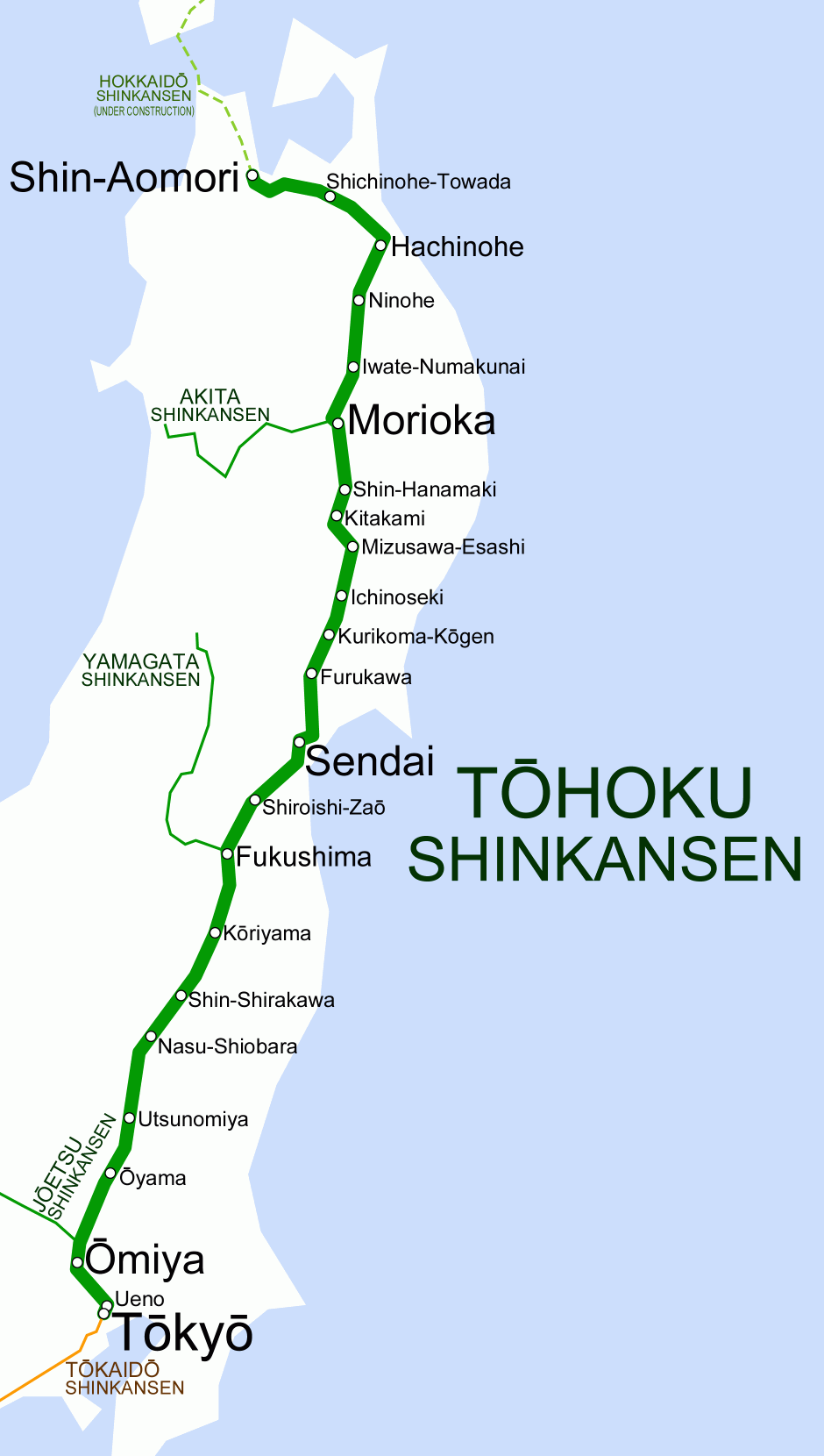
- Ichinoseki Tunnel on Tohoku Shinkansen line
- Interactive map of Ichinoseki Railway Tunnel

Overview
- Line: Tohoku Shinkansen
- Location: between Ichinoseki Station and Mizusawa-Esashi Station
- Coordinates: 38°56′59.2974″N 141°6′18.1728″E
- Status: active

Operation
- Opened: 1982
- Operator: East Japan Railway Company
- Traffic: Railway
- Character: Passenger and Freight

Technical
- Line length: 9,730 m (31,920 ft)
- No. of tracks: 2

Ichinoseki Tunnel (一関トンネル, Ichinoseki tonneru) is a tunnel on JR's Tohoku Shinkansen that is located near Ichinoseki Station in Ichinoseki city, Iwate Prefecture with total length of 9.730 km. It was built and completed in 1982.

== See also ==
- List of tunnels in Japan
- Seikan Tunnel undersea tunnel between Honshu-Hokkaido islands
- Kanmon Railway Tunnel undersea tunnel between Honshu-Kyushu islands
- Sakhalin–Hokkaido Tunnel
- Bohai Strait tunnel
