= Savings and Investments Union =

European Union finance initiative

The Savings and Investments Union (SIU) is a European Union initiative designed to improve pan-European finance infrastructure through a single, integrated market for capital and banking. It is the successor to the Capital Markets Union.
