= Financial integration =

Financial integration is a phenomenon in which financial markets in neighboring, regional and/or global economies are closely linked together. Various forms of actual financial integration include: Information sharing among financial institutions; sharing of best practices among financial institutions; sharing of cutting edge technologies (through licensing) among financial institutions; firms borrow and raise funds directly in the international capital markets; investors directly invest in the international capital markets; newly engineered financial products are domestically innovated and originated then sold and bought in the international capital markets; rapid adaption/copycat of newly engineered financial products among financial institutions in different economies; cross-border capital flows; and foreign participation in the domestic financial markets.

Because of financial market imperfections, financial integration in neighboring, regional and/or global economies is therefore imperfect. For example, imperfect financial integration can stem from the inequality of the marginal rate of substitutions of different agents. In addition to financial market imperfections, legal restrictions can also hinder financial integration. Therefore, financial integration can also be achieved from the elimination of restrictions pertaining to cross-border financial operations to allow (a) financial institutions to operate freely, (b) permit businesses to directly raise funds or borrow and (c) equity and bond investors to invest across the state line with fewer [or without imposing any] restrictions. However, many of the legal restrictions exist because of the market imperfections that hinder financial integration. Legal restrictions are sometimes second-best devices for dealing with the market imperfections that limit financial integration. Consequently, removing the legal restrictions can make the world economy become worse off. In addition, financial integration of neighboring, regional and/or global economies can take place through a formal international treaty which the governing bodies of these economies agree to cooperate to address regional and/or global financial disturbances through regulatory and policy responses. The extent to which financial integration is measured includes gross capital flows, stocks of foreign assets and liabilities, degree of co-movement of stock returns, degree of dispersion of worldwide real interest rates, and financial openness. Also there are views that not gross capital flows (capital inflow plus capital outflow), but bilateral capital flows determine financial integration of a country, which disregards capital surplus and capital deficit amounts. For instance, a county with only capital inflow and no capital outflow will be considered not financially integrated.

== History ==
Financial integration is believed to date back to the 1690s and was briefly interrupted at the start of the French Revolution (Neal, 1990). At the end of the 17th century, the world's dominant commercial empire was the Dutch Republic with the most important financial center located in Amsterdam where Banking, foreign exchange trading, stock trading and bullion trading were situated. And it was Amsterdam where Dutch investors directed funds abroad at the time. The Amsterdam Exchange had positioned itself as a world marketplace where many different types of securities and commodities were exchanged. It was also in this period that London and Amsterdam were closely integrated financially (Eagly and Smith, 1976; Neal, 1990); Amsterdam assumed the role as the senior partner in acting as the stabilizing force for London during times of English financial crisis.

However, it was in the Classical Gold Standard Era (the period from the mid-1870s until the start of World War I) that financial integration began to take shape in Europe. In these periods, for examples, the securities and foreign exchange markets were closely linked; stock and bond markets were internationally linked; international arbitrage activities were no strangers; and commercial and investment banks in major economies established a linkage (Jackson and Lothian, 1993; Lothian, 2000.

Eventually the 1980s and 1990s saw a significant increase in financial integration (Lothian, 2000). For example, facing a sharp increase in real exchange rate volatility and the increased risk in these years, institutions surrounding international finance worked together to address these challenges. Regulatory restrictions on international capital mobility such as capital control, interest rate ceilings, etc. were weakened and removed because such regulatory framework was costly in the new market environment. To contain the adverse effects of exchange-rate volatility, new financial instruments and markets were developed.

== Benefits ==
Benefits of financial integration include efficient capital allocation, better governance, higher investment and growth, and risk-sharing. Levine (2001) shows that financial integration helps strengthen the domestic financial sector allowing for more efficient capital allocation and greater investment and growth opportunities. As a result of financial integration, efficiency gains can also be generated among domestics firms because they have to compete directly with foreign rivals; this competition can lead to better corporate governance (Kose et al., 2006). If having access to a broader base of capital is a major engine for economic growth, then financial integration is one of the solutions because it facilitates flows of capital from developed economies with rich capital to developing economies with limited capital. These capital inflows can significantly reduce the cost of capital in capital-poor economies leading to higher investment (Kose et al., 2006). Likewise, financial integration can help capital-poor countries diversify away from their production bases that mostly depend on agricultural activities or extractions of natural resources; this diversification should reduce macroeconomic volatility (Kose et al., 2006). Financial integration can also help predict consumption volatility because consumers are risk-averse who have a desire to use financial markets as the insurance for their income risk, so the impact of temporary idiosyncratic shocks to income growth on consumption growth can be softened. Stronger comovement of consumption growth across the globe can also be a result of financial integration (Kose et al., 2006). Furthermore, financial integration can also provide great benefits for international risk-sharing (Lewis, 1999; Obstfeld, 1994; van Wincoop, 1999 ).

== Adverse effects ==
Financial integration can also have adverse effects. For example, a higher degree of financial integration can generate a severe financial contagion in neighboring, regional and/or global economies. In addition, Boyd and Smith (1992) argue that capital outflows can journey from capital-poor countries with weak institutions and policies to capital-rich countries with higher institutional quality and sound policies. Consequently, financial integration actually hurts capital-scarce countries with poor institutional quality and lousy policies.

== Recent development ==
During the past two decades, there has been a significant increase in financial integration; this increased financial integration generates a great deal of cross-border capital flows among industrial nations and between industrial and developing countries. In addition, this increase in financial integration pulls global financial markets closer together and escalates the presence of foreign financial institutions across the globe. With rapid capital flows around the world, the currency and financial crises in the late 1980s and 1990s were inevitable. Consequently, developing countries that welcomed excessive capital flows were more vulnerable to these financial disturbances than industrial nations. It is widely believed that these developing economies were much more adversely impacted as well. Because of these recent financial crises, there has been a heated debate among both academics and practitioners concerning the costs and benefits of financial integration. This debate is ongoing.(Kose et al., 2006)

=== Measures of integration ===
Traditional approaches to financial integration include cointegration-based methods, which capture long-run equilibrium relationships between markets, and time-varying correlation models such as Asymmetric Dynamic Conditional Correlation (ADCC-GARCH), which capture short-run co-movement dynamics. While these approaches provide important insights, they are typically limited to bilateral relationships and do not fully capture system-wide integration. In parallel, the connectedness literature, particularly the Diebold–Yilmaz framework, emphasizes spillovers and network-based transmission of shocks across markets.

==== Scaled Correlation Index ====
The Scaled Correlation Index (SCI) extends this literature by aggregating time-varying correlations across multiple markets, weighted by their relative economic size. This provides a systemic, rather than pairwise, measure of financial integration, aligning more closely with the concept of global or regional market interdependence.
