= Orders, decorations, and medals of the Kingdom of Hungary =

Flag of the Supreme Warlord of the Royal Hungarian Defence Forces (1939-1945, on land)

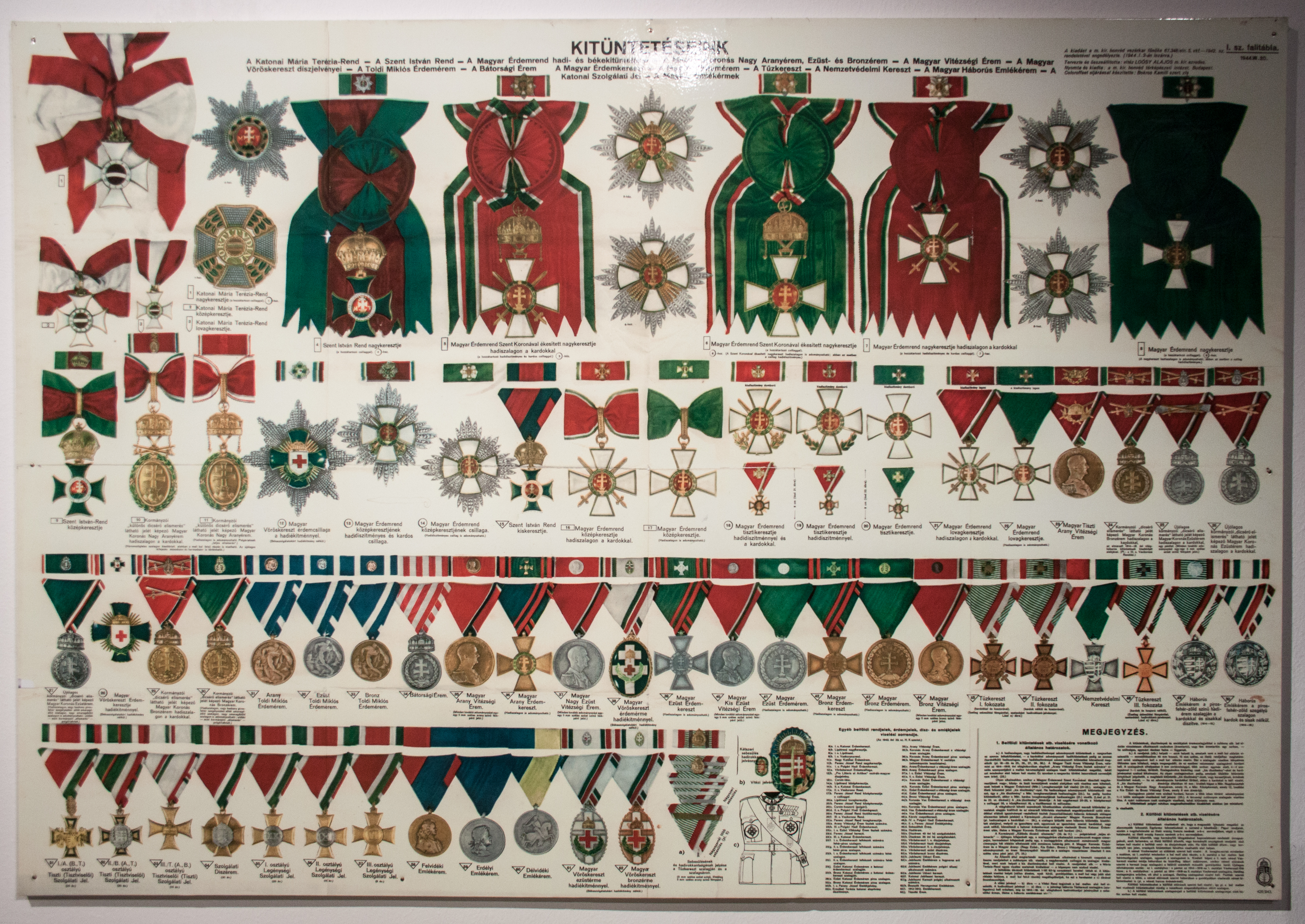
Orders, decorations, and medals of the Kingdom of Hungary in 1944

List of wear Orders, decorations, and medals of the Kingdom of Hungary in 1944.

Ribbon	Name of orders and medals
	Military Order of Maria Theresa Grand Cross
	Military Order of Maria Theresa Commander
	Military Order of Maria Theresa Knight
	Order of Saint Stephen of Hungary Grand Cross
	Order of Merit of the Kingdom of Hungary with the Holy Crown of Saint Stephen Grand Cross on war ribbon with swords
	Order of Merit of the Kingdom of Hungary with the Holy Crown of Saint Stephen Grand Cross on war ribbon
	Order of Merit of the Kingdom of Hungary with the Holy Crown of Saint Stephen
	Order of Merit of the Kingdom of Hungary Grand Cross on war ribbon with swords
	Order of Merit of the Kingdom of Hungary Grand Cross on war ribbon
	Order of Merit of the Kingdom of Hungary Grand Cross
	Order of Saint Stephen of Hungary Knights Commander
	Golden Military Merit Medal on war ribbon with swords
	Golden Military Merit Medal on war ribbon
	Golden Military Merit Medal on military ribbon
	Golden Military Merit Medal on civilian ribbon
	Decoration Star of the Hungarian Red Cross with war decoration
	Decoration Star of the Hungarian Red Cross
	Hungarian Corvin Chain
	Order of Merit of the Kingdom of Hungary Commander's Cross with Star on war ribbon and swords
	Order of Merit of the Kingdom of Hungary Commander's Cross with Star on war ribbon
	Order of Merit of the Kingdom of Hungary Commander's Cross with Star
	Order of Saint Stephen of Hungary Knight's Cross
	Order of Merit of the Kingdom of Hungary Commander's Cross on war ribbon and swords
	Order of Merit of the Kingdom of Hungary Commander's Cross on war ribbon
	Order of Merit of the Kingdom of Hungary Commander's Cross
	Order of Merit of the Kingdom of Hungary Officer's Cross on war ribbon and swords
	Order of Merit of the Kingdom of Hungary Officer's Cross on war ribbon
	Order of Merit of the Kingdom of Hungary Officer's Cross
	Hungarian Corvin Wreath
	Order of Merit of the Kingdom of Hungary Knight's Cross on war ribbon and swords
	Order of Merit of the Kingdom of Hungary Knight's Cross on war ribbon
	Order of Merit of the Kingdom of Hungary Knight's Cross
	Gold Medal of Bravery for Officers
	Hungarian Bronze Military Merit Medal, on its ribbon the missing world war one orders and medals miniature decoration
	Hungarian Silver Military Merit Medal on war ribbon and swords
	Hungarian Silver Military Merit Medal on war ribbon
	Hungarian Silver Military Merit Medal on military ribbon
	Hungarian Silver Military Merit Medal
	Cross of Merit of the Hungarian Red Cross with war decoration
	Cross of Merit of the Hungarian Red Cross
	Hungarian Bronze Military Merit Medal on war ribbon and swords
	Hungarian Bronze Military Merit Medal on war ribbon
	Hungarian Bronze Military Merit Medal on military ribbon
	Hungarian Bronze Military Merit Medal
	Miklos Toldi Gold Medal of Merit
	Miklos Toldi Silver Medal of Merit
	Miklos Toldi Bronze Medal of Merit
	Medal of Bravery
	Gold Medal of Bravery
	Golden Cross of Merit of Hungary on war ribbon
	Golden Cross of Merit of Hungary
	Large Silver Medal of Bravery
	Medal of Merit of the Hungarian Red Cross with war decoration
	Medal of Merit of the Hungarian Red Cross
	Silver Cross of Merit of Hungary on war ribbon
	Silver Cross of Merit of Hungary
	Small Silver Medal of Bravery
	Silver Medal of Merit of Hungary on emerald green ribbon
	Bronze Cross of Merit of Hungary on war ribbon
	Bronze Cross of Merit of Hungary
	Bronze Medal of Merit of Hungary on emerald green ribbon
	Bronze Medal of Bravery
	Fire Cross 1st class with wreath and swords
	Fire Cross 1st class (posthumous)
	Fire Cross 2nd class with wreath
	National Defence Cross
	Fire Cross 3rd class
	Hungarian War Commemorative Medal (combatants' class)
	Hungarian War Commemorative Medal (non-combatants' class)
	Long Service Crosses for Officers 1st class
	Medal for 40 years Faithful Service
	Medal for 35 years Faithful Service
	Long Service Crosses for Officers 2nd class
	Long Service Crosses for Officers 3rd class
	Upper Hungary Commemorative Medal
	Transylvania Commemorative Medal
	Lower Hungary Commemorative Medal
	Silver Medal of the Hungarian Red Cross with war decoration
	Silver Medal of the Hungarian Red Cross
	Bronze Medal of the Hungarian Red Cross with war decoration
	Bronze Medal of the Hungarian Red Cross
	Long Service Crosses for Non Commissioned Officers 1st class
	Long Service Crosses for Non Commissioned Officers 2nd class
	Long Service Crosses for Non Commissioned Officers 3rd class
	Fire Service Medal
	Foreign orders and medals
	Knight of the Golden Spur

== Sources ==
- Dr. Makai, Ágnes (1992). "A rendjelek, kitüntetések, dísz- és emlékjelvények viselési sorrendje". In Szabó Mihály (ed.). Állami és katonai kitüntetések. lektorálta: Dr. Pandula Attila. Budapest: Magyar Honvédség Oktatási és Kulturális Anyagellátó Központ. pp. 42–45.

== See also ==
- Order of Vitéz
- Orders, decorations, and medals of Austria-Hungary
- Orders, decorations, and medals of Hungary
