= George Dodd =

George Dodd may refer to:

- George Dodd (jockey) (1863–1881), Australian jockey, correct name John Dodd
- George Dodd (politician) (circa 1800 – 1864), English member of Parliament for Maidstone
- George Dodd (19th-century writer) (1808–1881), English journalist
- George Dodd (Australian writer) (active since 1990), Australian comedy writer
- George A. Dodd (1852–1925), United States Army general
- George H. Dodd (died 2020), perfumer
- George Dodd (tennis) (1882–1957), South African tennis player
- George Dodd (footballer) (1881–1960), English footballer

== See also ==
- George Dodds (1889–1977), British politician
