= Orders, decorations, and medals of Hungary =

The following is a list of medals, awards and decorations in use in Hungary. The state awards may be awarded only by the President of Hungary. The following honours are in order of precedence.

== Hungarian Order of Saint Stephen ==
Ribbon	Description	Established
	Awarded for the most outstanding, special merits, outstanding lifetime achievements and significant international achievements in the interests of Hungary.	1764–1918, 1938–1946, reinstated in 2011

== Hungarian Corvin Chain ==
Ribbon	Description	Established
Non-existent	Awarded in recognition of outstanding achievements in Hungarian science and art, as well as in the promotion of Hungarian education and culture.	1930-1943, reinstated in 2001

== Hungarian Order of Honour ==
Ribbon	Description	Established
	Awarded in recognition of outstanding service or heroism in the interests of Hungary and the nation.	2011

== Hungarian Order of Merit ==
Grand Cross with Chain	Grand Cross	Commander's Cross with Star	Commander's Cross	Officer's Cross	Knight's Cross	Description	Established
						Awarded to civilians for their merits.	1991
Non-existent						Awarded to the officers of military and armed corps for their merits.	1991

== Hungarian Cross of Merit ==
Gold Cross	Silver Cross	Bronze Cross	Description	Established
			Awarded to civilians for their merits.	1991
			Awarded to the military for their merits.	1991

== Remembrance Medal of 1956 ==
For living person	Posthumous	Description	Established
		For those who were involved in the 1956 Revolution.	1991

== Merit Medal for Home Hungary ==
Ribbon	Description	Established
		2013

== Merit Medal for For Alliance (Hungary) ==
Ribbon	Description	Established
		2013

== Wound Medal (Hungary) ==
1st Wound	2nd Wound	3rd Wound	4th Wound	5th Wound	Description	Established
					Awarded to the military for their wounds during combat operations	2013

== Merit Medal for Service ==
Laurel Wreath	Gold Cross	Silver Cross	Bronze Cross	Description	Established
				Awarded to the military for their merits during combat operations	2013
				Awarded to the military for their merits.	1992

== NATO Accession Commemorative Medal ==
Ribbon	Description	Established
	Awarded to the military who were involved in the NATO accession.	1999

== Distinguished Award for National Defense ==
1st class	2nd class	3rd class	Description	Established
			Awarded to military personnel for their merits for national defence.	2013

== Distinguished Award for the Golden Age ==
Gold class	Silver class	Bronze class	Description	Established
			Awarded to retired military personnel for their merits.	2013

== Preservation of Hungarian War Records Decoration ==
1st class	2nd class	3rd class	Description	Established
			Awarded to military personnel for preservation of Hungarian war records.	2013

== Service Medals for Officers ==
Service Medal for Officers with laurel wreath	Service Medal for Officers 1st class	Service Medal for Officers 2nd class	Service Medal for Officers 3rd class	Description	Established
				Awarded to officers for their military service.	1992

== Service Medals for NCO's ==
Service Medal for Officers with laurel wreath	Service Medal for NCO's 1st class	Service Medal for NCO's 2nd class	Service Medal for NCO's 3rd class	Description	Established
				Awarded to NCO's for their military service.	1992

== Service Medals for NCO's ==
Service Medal for enlisted personnel 1st class	Service Medal for enlisted personnel 2nd class	Service Medal for enlisted personnel 3rd class	Description	Established
			Awarded to enlisted personnel for their military service.	1992

== Service Medal for Flood Protection ==
Ribbon	Description	Established
	Awarded to military personnel for their merits for flood protection service.	2002

== First Exchange Fire Service Medal ==
Ribbon	Description	Established
	Awarded to military personnel for their merits for first exchange fire service.	2013

== Disaster Relief Service Medal ==
Ribbon	Description	Established
	Awarded to military personnel for their merits for disaster relief service.	2013

== Migration Crisis Management Service Medal ==
Ribbon	Description	Established
	Awarded to military personnel for their merits for migration crisis management service.	2015

== NATO-EU-OSCE-UN Service Medal ==
Ribbon	Description	Established
	Awarded to military personnel for their merits for NATO-EU-OSCE-UN service.	2002

== Peacekeeping Service Medal ==
Ribbon	Description	Established
	Awarded to military personnel for their merits for peacekeeping service.	2002

== Independent Democratic Hungary Commemorative Medal ==
Ribbon	Description	Established
		2002

== See also ==
- Orders, decorations, and medals of the Hungarian People's Republic
- History of Hungary
- List of military decorations
