= Bertalan Farkas =

Hungarian cosmonaut (born 1949)

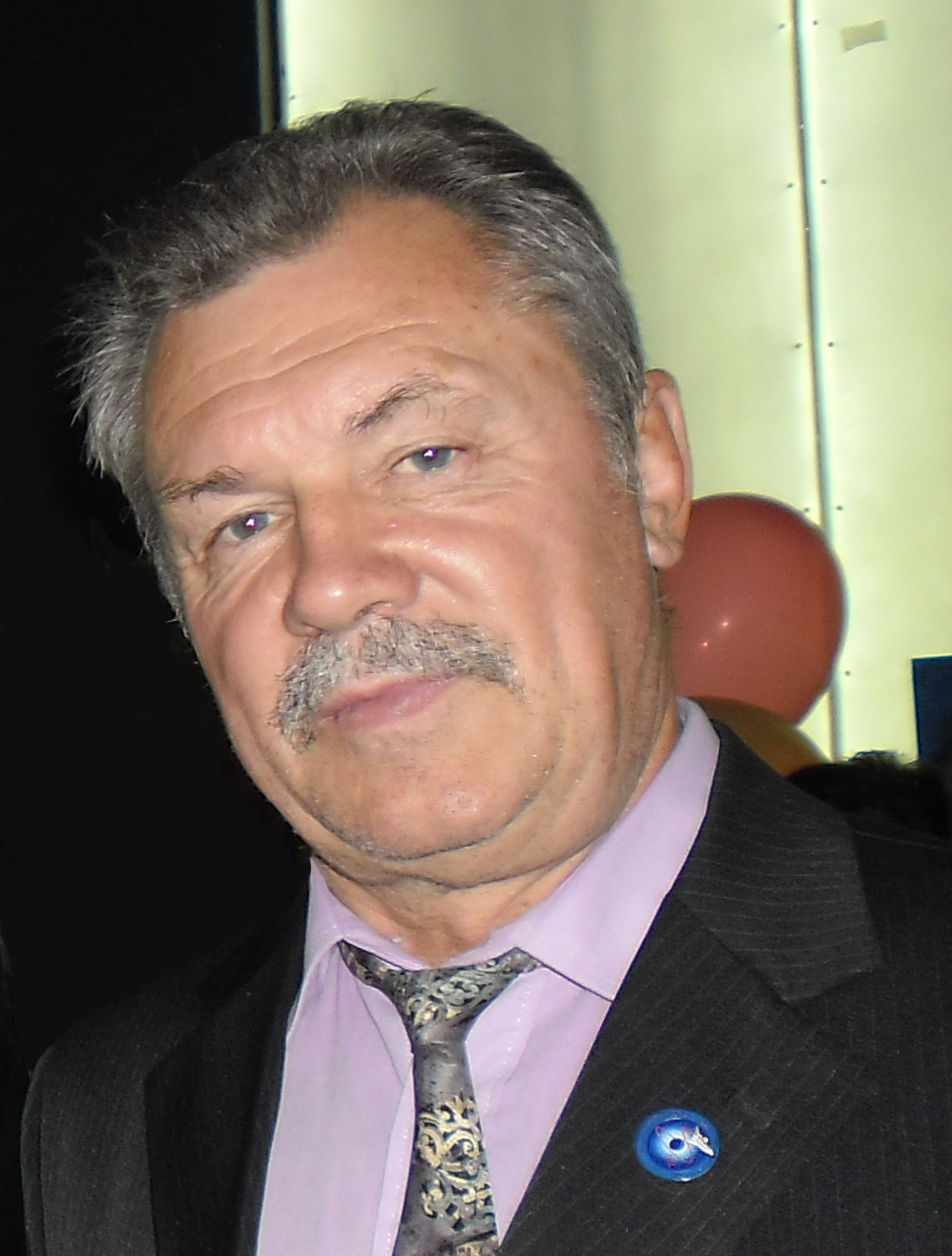
- Born: August 2, 1949 (age 77); Gyulaháza, Hungary
- Occupation: Pilot
- Space career

Interkosmos Cosmonaut
- Rank: Brigadier General, Hungarian Air Force
- Time in space: 7d 20h 45m
- Selection: 1978 Intercosmos Group
- Missions: Soyuz 36/Soyuz 35

Bertalan Farkas (Hungarian: [ˈfɒrkɒʃ ˈbɛrtɒlɒn], born August 2, 1949) is the first Hungarian cosmonaut, space explorer and fighter pilot. With his flight, Hungary became the seventh nation to be represented in space. Farkas is also the first Esperantist cosmonaut. He is currently the president of Airlines Service and Trade.

Following his mission, Hungarian-American Károly Simonyi (Charles Simonyi) was the second Hungarian astronaut – the only person in the entire world who has been twice in space as a space tourist and who had paid for himself for the spaceflights. The next Hungarian astronaut, Tibor Kapu, travelled to the International Space Station in June 2025.

== Early life and military career ==
Born in Gyulaháza, he attended high school (Bessenyei György Gimnázium) in Kisvárda. He graduated from the György Kilián Aeronautical College in Szolnok in 1969. He then attended the Krasnodar Military Aviation Institute in the Soviet Union, from where he graduated in 1972.

From 1972 to 1978, he served as an officer in the Hungarian Air Force with the 47th Tactical Air Wing based at Pápa Air Base, where he became a first-class fighter pilot in 1976, flying MiG-21 aircraft.

He continued his education during the next phase of his career. In 1986, he earned a degree from the Faculty of Transportation Engineering at the Budapest University of Technology and Economics, and from that same year until 1991, he worked as a member of the management team in the research group of the Interkosmos Council of the Hungarian Academy of Sciences. Between 1992 and 1995, while still active in the military, he flew An-24 and An-26 transport aircraft, as well as the Zlín Z-143. In 1995, he was promoted to brigadier general and appointed deputy flight inspector of the Hungarian Armed Forces.

From 1996 to 1997, he was an aviation attaché in Washington, D.C., in the United States. In 1997, he was caught drunk driving by American police, so he was called back home and retired. As a retiree, he continued his career in business as a co-owner of Atlant-Hungary Airlines, and then as president of the company from 2003. Between December 1, 2014, and June 30, 2015, he was an advisor to Péter Szijjártó, Minister of Foreign Affairs and Trade.

== Intercosmos program ==
In 1978 he volunteered to become a cosmonaut and was selected as part of the fifth international programme for Interkosmos. His backup cosmonaut was Béla Magyari.

Farkas, along with Soviet cosmonaut Valery Kubasov, was launched into space on Soyuz 36 from Baikonur Cosmodrome on May 26, 1980, at 18:20 (UTC).

While in orbit, Farkas conducted experiments in materials science. After 7 days, 20 hours and 45 minutes, and having completed 124 orbits, Farkas and Kubasov returned to Earth, landing 140 km southeast of Jezkazgan. Bertalan Farkas was awarded the title Hero of the Soviet Union on June 30, 1980.

== Personal life ==
Farkas is married to Anikó Farkas, and has four children: Gábor, Aida, Ádám and Bertalan. He loves tennis and plays it often.

He was a member of the Hungarian Democratic Forum, a Hungarian conservative political party, and was its candidate at the 2006 parliamentary election in the Baktalórántháza election district. He holds the rank of Commander (CLJ) in the Military and Hospitaller Order of Saint Lazarus of Jerusalem in Hungary.

=== Awards and decorations ===
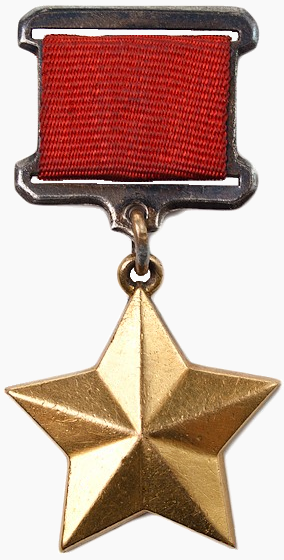

Badge	Hero of the Hungarian People's Republic			Hero of the Soviet Union
1st row	Hungarian Order of Saint Stephen	Commander's Cross of the Hungarian Order of Merit	Outstanding Service Medal of Merit	Gold Medal of Merit for Service to the Country
2nd row	Bronze Medal of Merit for Service to the Country	National Defense Merit Medal 30 years service	National Defense Merit Medal 25 years service	Medal of Merit for Armed Service to the Homeland 2000 hours of flying
3rd row	National Defense Merit Medal 20 years service	Medal of Merit for Armed Service to the Homeland 1500 hours of flying	Medal of Merit for Armed Service to the Homeland 1000 hours of flying	Medal of Merit for Armed Service to the Homeland 500 hours of flying
4th row	Distinguished Award for the Golden Age Silver class	Unidendified	Order of Lenin	
