= Lamfalussy =

Lamfalussy may refer to:

- Baron Alexandre Lamfalussy (1929-2015), a European economist and central banker.
- Lamfalussy process, an approach to the development of financial service industry regulations used by the European Union.
