= Committee of Wise Men on the Regulation of European Securities Markets =

The Committee of Wise Men on the Regulation of European Securities Markets was set up by the European Council on July 17, 2000 to develop proposals for making the regulatory process for European Union securities legislation more flexible, effective and transparent. The committee was chaired by Baron Alexandre Lamfalussy.

== European Shadow Financial Regulatory Committee Statement ==
The Lamfalussy Report, i.e., the Final Report of the Committee of Wise Men on the Regulation of European Securities Markets, published on 15 February 2001, now adopted by the European Council in Stockholm on 23 March 2001, presents a useful diagnosis of the issues and problems within the European Union capital markets. At the core of these concerns lie the difficulties of implementing reforms through state regulators who, given their inherent risk aversion reinforced by their accountability to national policy makers, have a tendency to exploit any ambiguities in EU Directives in favor of national exchanges and constituencies.

== Recommendations of the Lamfalussy Report ==
The Report proposed a four-level regulatory approach.

- Level 1 referred to EU framework legislation and involved the EU Commission, Council and Parliament.
- Level 2 referred to EU implementation and involves in addition to the EU Commission a European Securities Committee (ESC) and a European Securities Regulators Committee (ESRC) - (both yet to be created at the time).
- Level 3 referred to national implementation and co-operation and involves the ESRC and the Member States.
- Level 4 referred to enforcement and involves the Commission and the Member States.

The Report stated that the proposed ESC would be set up following the regulatory ‘comitology’ procedure suggested for implementing powers conferred on the Commission. It would be composed of high-ranking officials – State Secretaries in the Finance Ministries of the Member States or their personal representatives – and would be chaired by the European Commissioner responsible for the Internal Market in Financial Services. The ESRC would be set up as an independent advisory group to the Commission (outside the comitology process) and would be composed of national securities regulators.

== Members ==
- Alexandre Lamfalussy
- Cornelius Herkströter
- Luis Ángel Rojo
- Bengt Ryden
- Luigi Spaventa
- Norbert Walter
- Nigel Wicks
- Reporter: David Wright
- Secretary: Pierre Delsaux

== See also ==
- Lamfalussy process
