= Szentpétery =

Szentpétery is a Hungarian surname. Notable people with the surname include:

- Adam Szentpétery (born 1956), Slovak-Hungarian artist
- Aranka Szentpétery (1933–2023), Slovak-Hungarian actress
- Csaba Szentpétery (born 1968), Hungarian ice dancer
