= Stephen Busby =

British biochemist and academic

Stephen Busby FRS
- Education: University of Cambridge (B.A. 1972), University of Oxford (D.Phil. 1975)
- Known for: Molecular mechanisms controlling gene expression in bacteria
- Scientific career
- Fields: Biochemistry
- Institutions: Pasteur Institute, University of Birmingham
- Doctoral advisor: George Radda
- Other academic advisors: Rex Richards

Stephen Busby FRS is a British biochemist, and professor at the University of Birmingham. His research is concerned with the molecular mechanisms controlling gene expression in bacteria, especially regulation of transcription initiation in Escherichia coli.

== Career ==
Stephen Busby started his career working for several years at the Pasteur Institute in Paris, where he remained until moving to the University of Birmingham in 1983.

After obtaining his doctorate at Oxford, he worked in the laboratory of George Radda, in collaboration with Rex Richards, on nuclear magnetic resonance of metabolites. Subsequently his interest moved towards regulatory mechanisms and transcription in bacteria, participating in making recommendations about transcription initiation, and developing new methods for studying recombinant protein production.

== Administrative activities ==
Busby was appointed as Professor of Biochemistry at the University of Birmingham in 1995 and was Dean of Science and then Life & Health Science from 2000 to 2004. He was Head of the School of Biosciences from 2012 to 2016. Over much of the same period he was vice-chair and then chair of the Biochemical Society (2011–2016). Busby has continued to serve as Professor of Biochemistry at the University of Birmingham, taking on a variety of roles, including acting head of Biosciences in 2025.
