= Hungarian Space Office =

Hungarian government body for space activities

Hungarian Space Research Office

Agency overview
- Formed: January 1992
- Jurisdiction: Government of Hungary
- Headquarters: Budapest, Hungary
- Agency executive: -
- Website: hso.hu

The Hungarian Space Research Office (HSO; Hungarian: Magyar Űrkutatási Iroda) is the official Government of Hungary agency responsible for the civilian space program as well as aeronautics and aerospace research, which was integrated in the Ministry of National Development in 2018. It is the organization whose purpose is to coordinate Hungarian space exploration-related activities, both national programs and European Space Agency related programs, where Hungary is a member state.

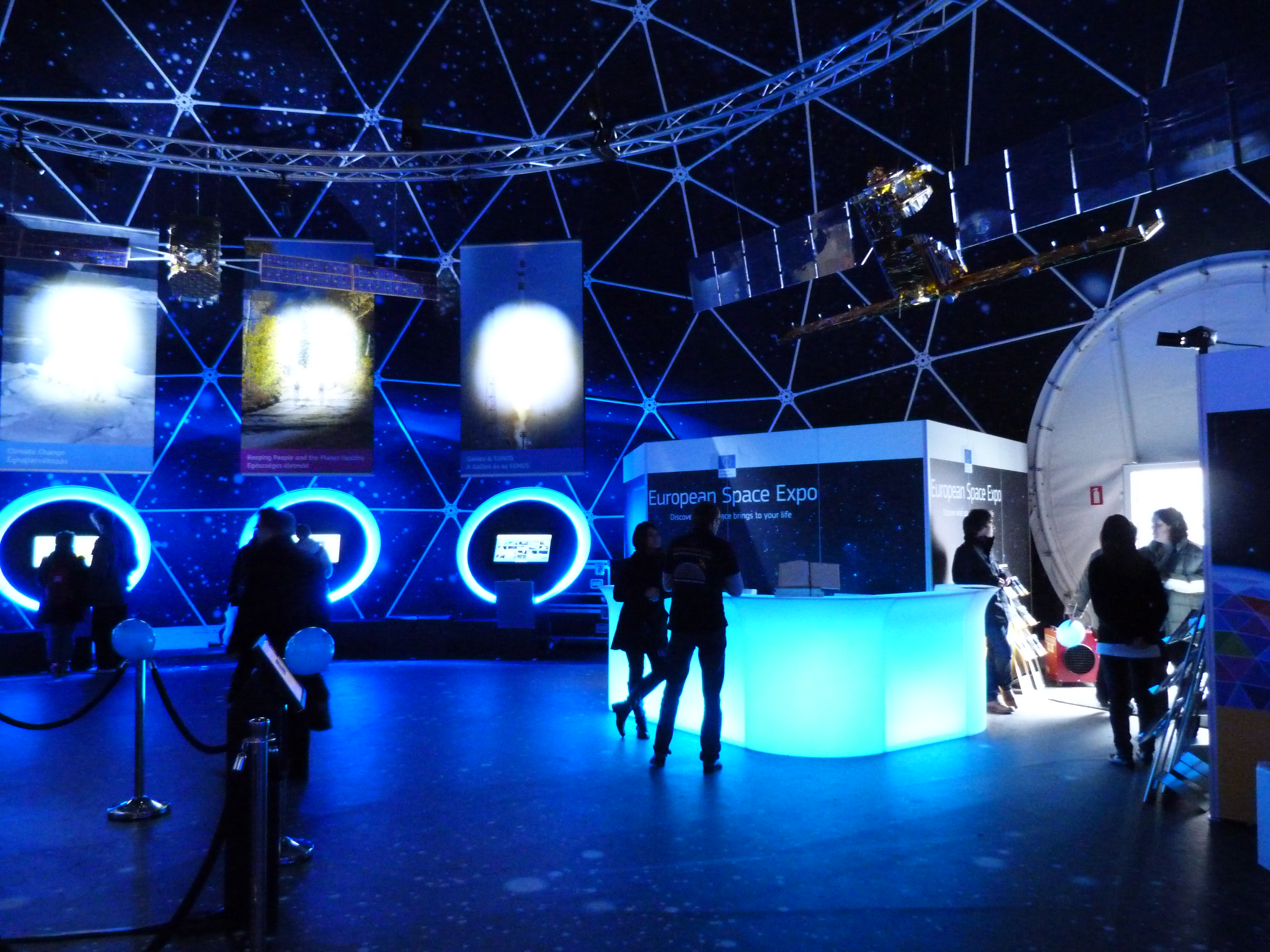
European Space Expo in Budapest

The Hungarian Space Board (HSB), headed by Dr. Kálmán Kovács (former Minister for Informatics and Communications), helps the work of the Government in strategic cases. The government advisory body in technical matters is the Scientific Council on Space Research (SCSR). The SCSR provides the scientific background of all Hungarian space activities. The research and application activities have been carried out in about 25 scientific institutes and university departments. Their personnel, involved in space-related work consists of more than 250 scientists and engineers. The Hungarian government established it in January 1992. The former directors are Előd Both (1997-2015) and Fruzsina Tari (2015-2018).

In 2003, the Hungarian Space Office signed the ECS Agreement in 2003 with the ESA to become a cooperative state. On 24 February 2015, the office signed to become part of the ESA, and deposited their ratification on 4 November 2015.

Hungarian Space Office is integrated in the Ministry of National Development. Nowadays, it works in the Hungarian Ministry of Foreign Affairs and Trade. Leader: Dr. Orsolya Ferenc, Ministerial Commissioner for Space Research.

== HUNOR ==
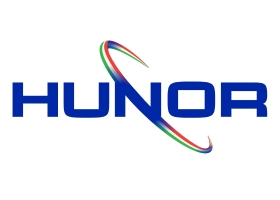
Logo of the HUNOR program

In July 2022, the Hungarian foreign ministry signed a memorandum of understanding with Axiom Space to develop the HUNOR or the Hungarian to Orbit Program. In September 2023 it was announced that the two parties signed a spaceflight framework agreement facilitate the launch of a Hungarian astronaut to the International Space Station. On August 5, 2024, it was announced that Tibor Kapu would be the Hungarian Astronaut to be launched on-board Axiom Mission 4 (Ax-4).

Heavy Tools, which also provided uniforms for Hungarian Olympic and Paralympic Team, sponsored Kapu.

Kapu, a recreational skydiver with a master of mechanical engineering, was selected out of a pool of 247 applicants to be Hungary's astronaut and underwent rigorous training. Gyula Cserényi, an electrical engineer and amateur steeplechase racer was selected as the backup and the second active Hungarian astronaut.

With the launch of Ax-4 on 25 June 2025, Kapu became the third Hungarian to reach space. Ax-4 also includes the first Polish and Indian astronauts since the fall of the Soviet Union, with the Polish astronaut flying as part of the ESA/POLSA Ignis mission.

== See also ==
- List of government space agencies
