= Hungarian Order of Honour =

Awarded by President of Hungary
- Type: State decoration
- Established: 2011; 14 years ago
- Status: Currently constituted

Statistics
- First induction: 2012

Precedence
- Next (higher): Hungarian Corvin Chain
- Next (lower): Hungarian Order of Merit
- Ribbon of the Hungarian Order of Honour

The Hungarian Order of Honour (Hungarian: Magyar Becsület Rend) was established in 2011 by Act CCII of 2011. Although the law does not mention the hierarchy, it proposes that the Hungarian Order of Honour is the third highest state award in the Hungarian honours system, after the Hungarian Order of Saint Stephen and the Hungarian Corvin Chain.

According to the text of the law, "the Hungarian Order of Honour is awarded in recognition of outstanding service or heroism in the interests of Hungary and the nation." A maximum of thirty medals may be awarded each year. In all cases, the honours are awarded by the President of the Republic on the recommendation and countersignature of the Prime Minister or the Minister concerned. The medal is usually awarded on a special occasion, usually a national holiday such as 15 March or 23 October, to commemorate a significant event in Hungary's history. A maximum of 30 awards are permitted to be awarded to Hungarians per year.

== Insignia ==
The Order of Hungarian Honour is a badge of the Order of the Holy Crown, suspended from the Holy Crown and decorated with swords crossed at the ears. The insignia is worn on the neck. Oval gold medal, slightly convex design, 47 x 39mm, with enamelled decoration on the edge. On the obverse, the heraldic image of the coat of arms of Hungary on the left in an oval field. Double cross resting on a triple pile, with an open leafy crown at the base. On the obverse, a wreath of triple laurel leaves with a 13 mm gold border. Above and below, and in the centre of each side, a gold ribbon laid crosswise on top of each other.

== List of members ==
Year	Name	Notes
2020	Richárd Hardi (1958– )	
2016	Szilvia Lubics (1974– )	
2016	László Tőkés (1952– )	
2016	Placid Olofsson (1916–2017)	
2012	Ilona Szűcs (1912–2016)	
