= Gyulaháza =

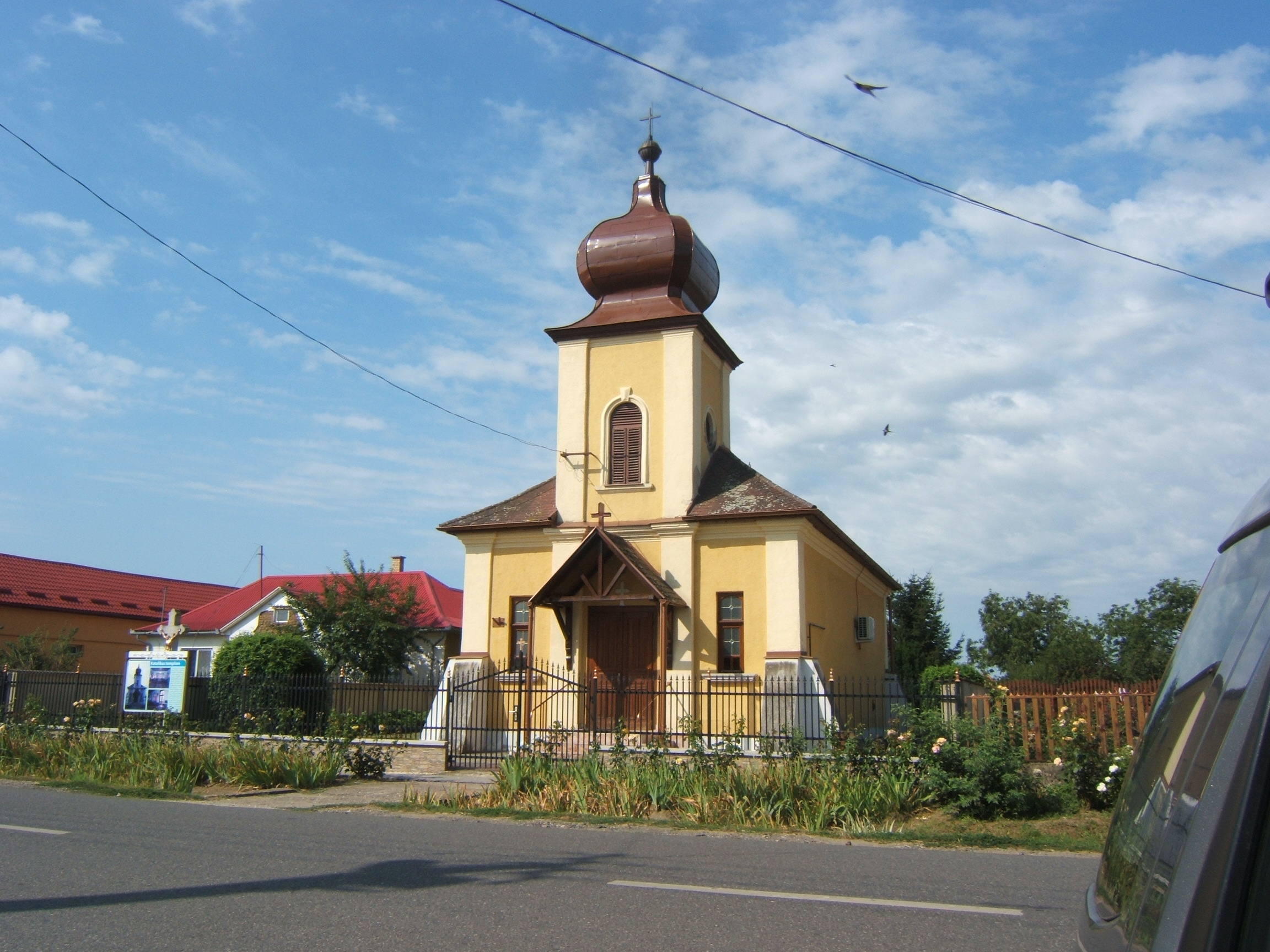
- Church of the Sacred Heart

- Flag Coat of arms

- Location within Hungary
- Coordinates: 48°08′22″N 22°06′35″E
- Country: Hungary
- County: Szabolcs-Szatmár-Bereg

Area
  - Total: 22.09 km^{2} (8.53 sq mi)

Population (2001)
  - Total: 2,082
  - Density: 94.25/km^{2} (244.1/sq mi)
- Time zone: UTC+1 (CET)
  - Summer (DST): UTC+2 (CEST)
- Postal code: 4545
- Area code: 45
- Website: https://www.gyulahaza.hu/

Gyulaháza is a village in Szabolcs-Szatmár-Bereg county, in the Northern Great Plain region of eastern Hungary.

== Geography ==
It covers an area of 22.09 km^{2} (9 sq mi) and has a population of 2082 people (2001).

== Notable people ==
- Bertalan Farkas, Hungarian astronaut
