= Stock market equivalence =

Stock market equivalence is granted by the European Union to those countries whose stock markets are deemed to be 'equivalent' to those of the EU countries. On 3 January 2018, the EU implemented the "Markets in Financial Instruments Directive II" (colloquially known as "MiFID II") which required all European investment firms & traders to trade the shares of a company listed in the EU on a stock exchange within the EU or an equivalent third country exchange. In order to gain equivalence, the trading venues of the concerned country should have a high level of investor protection and sound mechanisms to deal with insider trading. The main purpose of this measure is to protect the interests of investors based in the EU. Analysts have called it a pioneer in financial regulation with the potential to restructure the global financial system. As of 17 November 2023, only three jurisdictions had been granted equivalence: the United States of America, Australia and Hong Kong. Switzerland too was granted equivalence, but only temporarily, and the EU announced in early May 2019 that it would not renew equivalence for Switzerland after 1 July 2019. This was part of the wider Swiss-EU trade dispute.

== Background and purpose ==
Due to the 2008 financial crisis, the vulnerabilities in the transparency of financial markets around the world were exposed. MifID I, which was implemented in 2007, proved inadequate in ensuring the security of EU's investors. After the 2008 financial crisis, the European Commission wanted to hold stock markets, investment firms, banks, brokers and various investment funds around the world to the same standards of transparency and accountability which were set up for the entities operating within the EU. Many analysts believed that the 2008 financial crisis was precipitated because of the wide discrepancies that existed in the regulatory frameworks of different jurisdictions. Therefore, governments, central banks and financial regulatory authorities around the world decided to harmonise their rules and regulations in order to prevent unscrupulous organisations and individuals from gaming the financial system, and thus ensure investor protection. MifiD II was drafted with the purpose of eliminating these loopholes, and stock market equivalence has an important role in achieving this goal.

The European Commission formally adopted proposals for MiFID II on 20 October 2011. This piece of legislation consisted of a number of measures to update and strengthen the financial regulatory framework of the EU. Article 23 of this directive contains the provision for stock market equivalence.

== Overview ==
MiFID II Article 23 made it mandatory for European investment firms and traders to trade shares of a company listed in any of the EU member countries on a stock market within the EU or an equivalent third country trading venue. This is also known as the 'trading mandate' or 'Share Trading Obligation'. This mandate covers all stocks admitted to trading on a regulated market or traded on an exchange within the EU. This obligation also applies to Multilateral Trading Facilities (MTFs). Similar equivalence decisions have been made by the European Commission on insurance, credit rating and auditing, among other areas.

== Procedure for Granting Equivalence ==
The European Commission assesses a third country's legal and supervisory framework to determine an equivalence decision. It does this with advice from the three European Supervisory Authorities. The Commission bases this assessment process on a proportionality and risk-based approach. It then authenticates the third-country's compliance with the equivalence criteria. These criteria are applied in a proportionate way to the identified risks. Although the risks are the focus of the equivalence decision, other factors are also considered.

== Criteria for Granting Equivalence ==
In order to render an equivalence decision, the EC considers four factors. First, whether the markets have effective authorization, supervision, and enforcement on an ongoing basis. Second, whether the markets have clear and transparent rules for securities so the securities are traded fairly, efficiently, and are freely negotiable. Third, whether security issuers are subject to information requirements to ensure a high level of investor protection. Fourth, whether there is prevention of market abuse from insider dealing and market manipulation.

== Concerns and Criticism ==
The requirement that stocks, bonds, debentures, derivatives etc. only be traded on venues permitted by the EU poses a potential problem for traders and investment firms. For example, if the European and American authorities did not reach an equivalence decision, European investment firms would not be able to participate in American markets even though they are far more liquid than European ones. Without any equivalence decision, fund managers in the EU would be forced to trade shares of companies like Google parent Alphabet and Amazon through their less liquid listing in Frankfurt, rather than their main listing on the Nasdaq in New York. This regulation thus led to greater complexity which had to be resolved by equivalence decisions before MifiD II was implemented. Moreover, in the wake of the formulation of MifiD II, many investment firms decided to stop offering trading in EU based markets due to the low levels of liquidity. This led to reduced trading volumes. The European Commission put an end to most of these concerns by granting equivalence to the stock exchanges in the US, Hong Kong and Australia. These equivalence decisions permitted European investment firms to tap liquidity in dual listed shares outside the EU. A strong opponent of MifiD II was the government of the United Kingdom. This opposition stemmed from political considerations. One problem is that only countries and not individual firms are deemed equivalent by the European Commission. Following Brexit, the UK would become a third country, needing to be granted equivalence in order to continue to trade with the EU. Due to the uncertainty that surrounds Brexit, UK financial services firms would have to wait for the UK to receive a positive assessment from the Commission before they could utilize the equivalence mechanism.

== Swiss-EU dispute ==
In December 2017, while determining equivalence decisions for various countries, the EC decided that Swiss exchanges would be deemed equivalent for only one year, unlike the unlimited equivalence that the US, Hong Kong and Australia received. This was further extended by six months in December 2018. But in May 2019, the EU announced that it would not be renewing equivalence for Switzerland. As the stocks of the largest Swiss companies are traded in Switzerland as well as on European exchanges, the revoking of Switzerland's equivalence status would have effectively banned EU investment firms from trading these shares on Swiss stock markets. This could have caused a collapse in the participation of European investors on the Swiss stock exchange. To prevent this, the Swiss government banned the shares of Swiss companies listed within Switzerland from being traded on any EU exchange. Now that they are not traded on exchanges in the EU, the restriction under Mifid II is no longer applicable to Swiss stocks. This simply means that EU investment firms are no longer required to trade them on EU markets. All this is part of a bigger issue between the two sides. Swiss-EU economic relations are governed by about 120 different bilateral agreements. These make most of the EU's single market accessible to Swiss businesses. But the EU wants to replace this arrangement with a new framework agreement. The purpose is to simplify the relations between Switzerland and the EU. A draft of the new agreement exists but the Swiss side first decided to go for public consultation and have more recently asked for clarification. Frustrated by the delay, the EU allowed the equivalence status for Swiss stock markets to lapse.
