= George Radda =

Hungarian-British chemist (1936–2024)

Sir George Radda CBE FRS
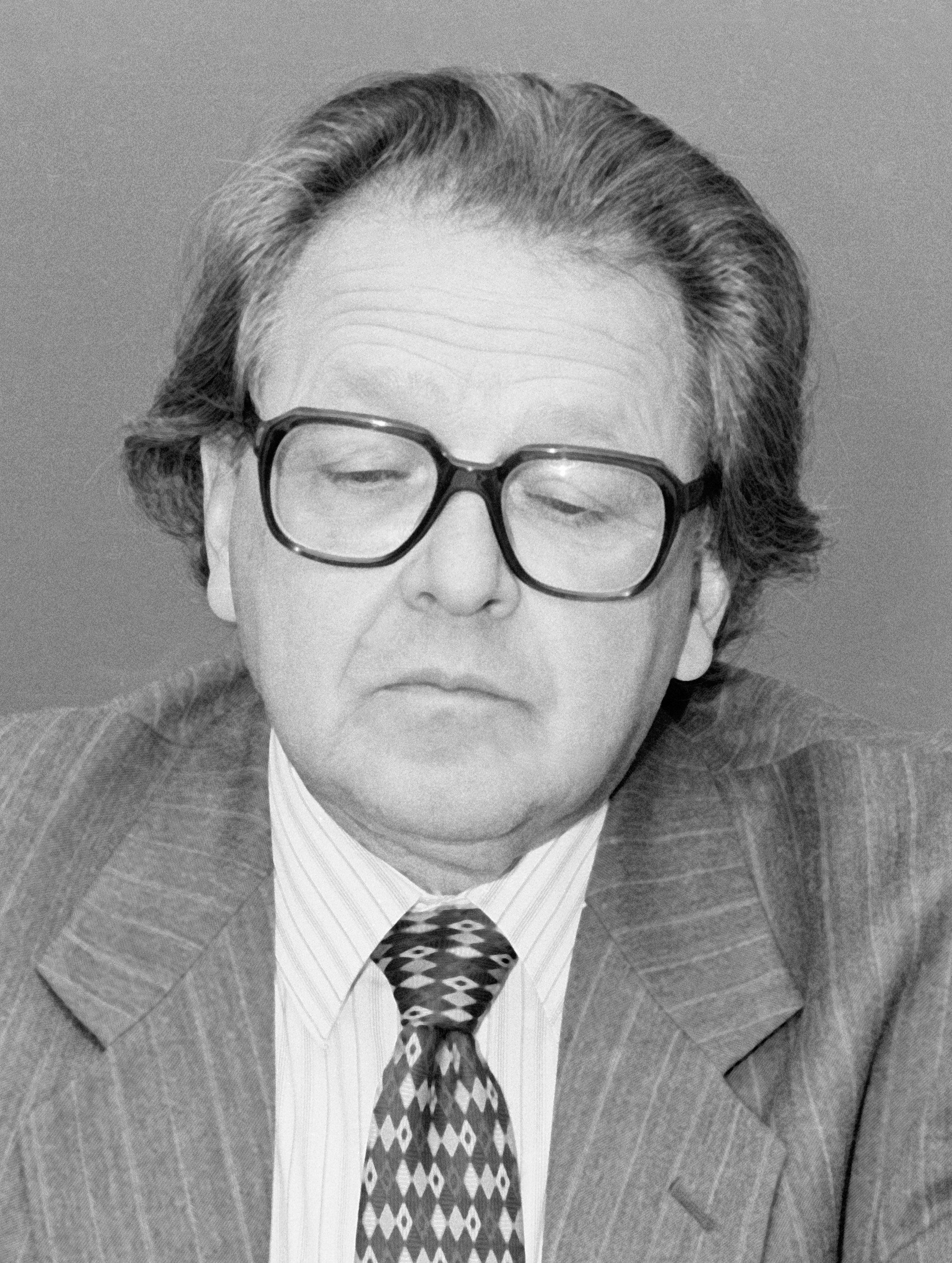
- Radda in 1996
- Born: Radda György Károly; 9 June 1936; Győr, Hungary
- Died: 13 September 2024 (aged 88)
- Citizenship: British citizenship and Hungarian citizenship - Dual citizenship
- Education: University of Oxford
- Known for: Molecular imaging of heart metabolism and function
- Awards: Colworth Medal (1956); British Heart Foundation Gold Medal (1982); Buchanan Medal (1987); CBE (1993); Knight Bachelor (2000); International Academy of Cardiovascular Sciences Medal of Merit (2007)
- Scientific career
- Workplaces: University of Oxford; UK Medical Research Council; A*-STAR
- Doctoral students: Stephen Busby; Alister McGrath; George H. Dodd
- Website: imaging.ox.ac.uk/network-members/gradda/

Sir George Charles Radda CBE FRS (Hungarian: Radda György Károly; 9 June 1936 – 13 September 2024) was a Hungarian-British chemist.

== Biography ==
Radda was born in Hungary on 9 June 1936. In 1957, he attended Merton College, Oxford, to study chemistry and worked on electrophilic aromatic substitution with Richard Norman and Jeremy Knowles, having set aside an earlier interest in literary criticism. His early work was concerned with the development and use of fluorescent probes for the study of structure and function of membranes and enzymes. He became interested in using spectroscopic methods including nuclear magnetic resonance (NMR) to study complex biological material. In 1974, his research paper was the first to introduce the use of NMR to study tissue metabolites. In 1981, he and his colleagues published the first scientific report on the clinical application of his work. This resulted in the installation of a magnet large enough to accommodate the whole human body for NMR investigations in 1983 at the John Radcliffe Hospital in Oxford.

In 1982 Radda published work concerning the relationship between deoxygenated haemoglobin and the NMR signal.

From 1996 until his retirement in 2003, Radda was Chief Executive of the Medical Research Council in the UK. In 2009 he was appointed chairman of the Biomedical Research Council in Singapore.

Radda died on 13 September 2024, at the age of 88.

== Awards ==
Radda received numerous prestigious awards and honours for his pioneering efforts in using spectroscopic techniques for metabolic studies, including a Buchanan Medal in 1987. He was appointed a Commander of the Order of the British Empire (CBE) in the 1993 Birthday Honours for services to science, and knighted in the 2000 Birthday Honours for services to biomedical science.

In addition, he was a Fellow of Merton College, Oxford, a Fellow of the Royal Society and was a British Heart Foundation Professor of Molecular Cardiology. In 1998, he was an inaugural Fellow of the Academy of Medical Sciences. He was also awarded many distinguished prizes throughout his scientific career. He was an Honorary Member of the American Heart Association and was awarded the Citation for International Achievement.

In 2015, he was conferred an award as an Honorary Citizen of Singapore.

In 2018 he was awarded the Hungarian Corvin Chain. This is the second highest Hungarian state decoration and is awarded to persons who have made an outstanding contribution to the improvement of Hungarian public thought, science and culture.
