= List of Hungarian astronauts =

The following is a list of Hungarian astronauts who have traveled into space, sorted by date of first flight.

As of 2025, three Hungarian nationals have been in space. The first Hungarian national in space was Bertalan Farkas on Soyuz 36 in 1980.

Philanthropist Charles Simonyi was the second Hungarian national in space, the first Hungarian spaceflight tourist, and the overall fifth spaceflight tourist to the ISS.

Tibor Kapu became the third Hungarian national in space, and the second Hungarian national to visit the ISS, when he launched on Crew Dragon for Axiom Mission 4 in June 2025.

== List ==
Image	Name	Mission	Mission start	Mission duration	Space station	Mission objectives	Ref.
	Bertalan Farkas	Soyuz 36/35	May 26, 1980	7 days, 20 hours, 45 minutes	Salyut 6	Interkosmos space program	
	Charles Simonyi	Soyuz TMA-10/9	April 7, 2007	13 days, 18 hours, 59 minutes and 51 seconds	ISS	Fifth spaceflight tourist	
	Charles Simonyi	Soyuz TMA-14/13	March 26, 2009	12 days, 19 hours, 26 minutes and 42 seconds	ISS		
	Tibor Kapu	Axiom Mission 4	June 25, 2025	20 days, 2 hours and 59 minutes	ISS		

== See also ==
- Hungarian Space Office#HUNOR
