= Andrew Crockett (banker) =

British banker (1943–2012)

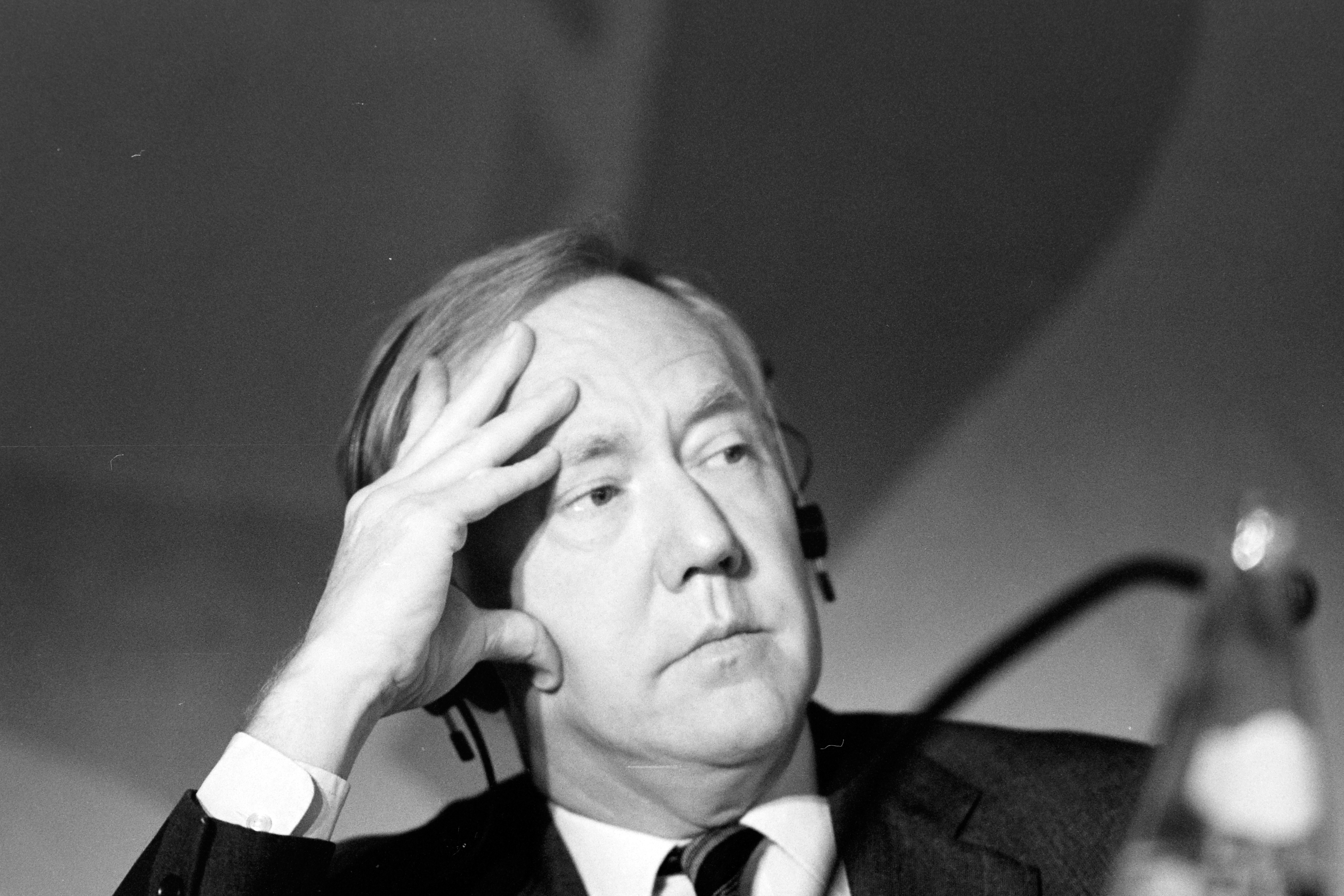
Andrew Crockett in 1994

Sir Andrew Duncan Crockett (23 March 1943 – 3 September 2012) was a British banker, economist and public servant. He was the general manager of the Bank for International Settlements (BIS).

== Early life and education ==
Born in Glasgow, Crockett was educated at Queens' College, Cambridge and Yale University.

== Career ==
Crockett joined the Bank of England in 1966, and the International Monetary Fund in 1972. He was an executive director of the Bank of England from 1989 to 1993, before becoming General Manager of the Bank for International Settlements (BIS) in 1994. After retiring from the BIS in 2003, he joined JPMorgan Chase, the U.S. banking firm, where he was Special Advisor to the chairman and a member of the executive committee until shortly before his death.

Crockett was also a member of the Group of Thirty. He authored several books on economic and financial subjects, as well as numerous articles in scholarly publications.

=== Honours ===
He was knighted in 2003 and named European Banker of the Year in 2000

== Personal life ==
He died in San Francisco, California, aged 69, following a long battle with pancreatic cancer.

Crockett was survived by his wife of 46 years, Marjorie (née Hlavacek), and their three children. He was also survived by his mother and two brothers.

Preceded by Alexandre Lamfalussy	General manager of the Bank for International Settlements; 1994–2003	Succeeded by Malcolm Knight
