= Aranka Szentpétery =

Slovak actress (1968–2019)

- Born: 9 December 1933; Kráľovský Chlmec, Czechoslovakia
- Died: 19 January 2023 (aged 89)
- Occupations: Stage and television actress

Aranka Szentpétery (9 December 1933 – 19 January 2023) was a Slovak theatre and television actress of Hungarian ethnicity. She spent nearly her entire career at the Jókai theatre in Komárno.

== Biography ==
Szentpétery was born on 9 December 1933 in Kráľovský Chlmec to a family of former aristocrats. As a young girl, she competed in gymnastics. In 1953 she joined the State Theater in Bratislava. In 1960 she moved to the Hungarian regional theatre in Komárno, where she acted until her retirement in 1991. Following her retirement, she occasionally acted in the Jókai theatre until her death.

In addition to her theater work, she starred in TV Shows Mafstory and Susedia.

In 2020 she received the Golden Hungarian Cross of Merit from the president János Áder for her contribution to preservation of Hungarian identity in Slovakia. She died on 19 January 2023 at the age of 89.
