= Medal of Bravery (Hungary) =

Medal given for valor or military bravery

The Hungarian Medal of Bravery (Vitézségi Érem) was a medal given for military bravery or valor.

== Background ==
Hungary became independent in 1920 following the dissolution of the Austro-Hungarian Empire after the First World War. As a consequence of its new independence, Hungary had to develop a national system of honors and awards.

The Hungarian Medal for Bravery was inspired by the Austro-Hungarian Medal for Bravery, which came is several versions depending upon the importance of the action and the rank of the recipient.

Initially the award was instituted in 1922 in silver only. By 14 April 1939 gold, large silver, small silver and bronze awards were issued to non-commissioned officers and men and on 12 September 1942 the gold medal for bravery award (Magyar Tiszti Arany Vitézségi Érem) for officers was added. It served a Hungary's primary award for recognizing combat heroism during World War II.

The medal features on its obverse the profile of Hungarian Regent Vice Admiral Miklós Horthy. Horthy lead Hungary from 1920 until he was deposed in 1944. On the reverse of the medal is the coat of arms of Hungary with crossed swords added.

== Recipients of the Gold Medal of Bravery for Officers ==
- 1. Tibor Massányi, Captain, September 1942.
- 2. vitéz dr. László Merész, Ensign, August 6. 1942. Uman
- 3. vitéz Sándor Horváth, 2nd Lieutenant, December 1942. Don
- 4. vitéz László Duska, Captain, January 20. 1943. Ostrogozhsk
- 5. vitéz József Barankay de Baranka, Captain, 1944. Galícia
- 6. vitéz László Molnár, 2nd Lieutenant, August 7. 1944. for his 27th aerial victory
- 7. János Bozsóki, Ensign, September 22. 1944. Torda
- 8. László Spirák, Major, May 16–17. 1944. Hluboká nad Vltavou
- 9. Gyula Ágner, 1st Lieutenant, April 27. 1944. Perecseny
- 10. vitéz Ákos Székely, Staff Captain, April - July 1944. Bridgehead of Lukva
- 11. Zoltán Álgya-Papp de Alsókomána, Major general, October 23–26. 1944. Munkács–Szolyva
- 12. Árpád Rechtzügel, Captain, September 16. 1944. Torda
- 13. György Vastagh de Alsótarja, Colonel, October 3. 1944. Szentes
- 14. vitéz György Debrődi, 1st Lieutenant, May 1944. for his 25th aerial victory
- 15. Miklós Jónás, Ensign, January 20. - February 9. 1943. Don
- 16. Dániel Lővei, Ensign, March 28. 1944. Niwiska Obertyn
- 17. Ferenc Mező, Ensign, October 3. 1944. Kászonjakabfalva
- 18. Vilmos Vértes, Captain, September 5–15, 1944. Torda
- 19. Edömér Tassonyi, Major, October–November 1944. Soroksár
- 20. Tamás Marjai, 2nd Lieutenant, January 1945. Vértes Hills
- 21. Hans-Ulrich Rudel, German Luftwaffe Colonel, 1st foreign recipient
- 22. Helmut Lipfert, German fighter ace, 2nd foreign recipient
- 23. Rudolf Ernst Max Pannier, SS-Standartenführer, 3rd and last known foreign recipient
- 24. vitéz Dezső Szentgyörgyi, Ensign, March 1945. for his 25th aerial victory
- 25. Imre Pataki, Captain

== Gallery ==
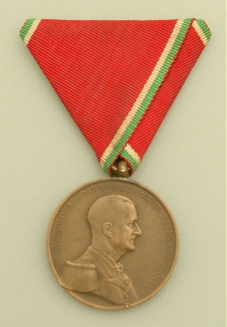
Bronze medal

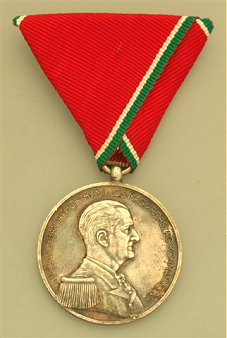
Little Silver medal

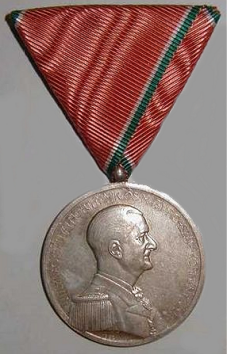
Great Silver medal

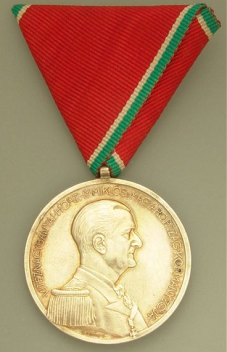
Golden medal

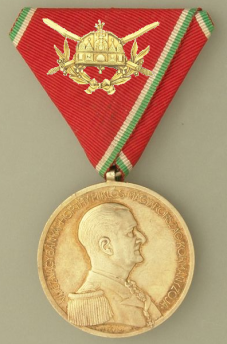
Golden medal for officers

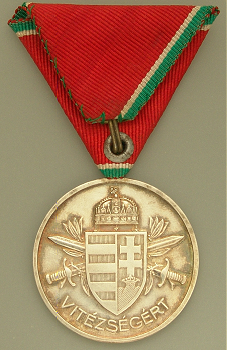
Reverse of the Golden medal for officers
