= Hungarian Corvin Chain =

Award in Hungary

Awarded by President of Hungary
- Type: State decoration
- Established: 2001; 25 years ago
- Motto: Pro scientia - litteris - et artibus (For science, literature and the arts)
- Status: Currently constituted

Statistics
- First induction: 2001
- Last induction: 2018

Precedence
- Next (higher): Hungarian Order of Saint Stephen
- Next (lower): Hungarian Order of Honour

The Hungarian Corvin Chain (Hungarian: Magyar Corvin-lánc) is the second highest Hungarian state decoration, after the Hungarian Order of Saint Stephen, and is awarded to persons who have made an outstanding contribution to the improvement of Hungarian public thought, science and culture. Unlike other medal holders, the recipients form a body which meets periodically to discuss the state of Hungary.

The Corvin Chain Medal was originally established in 1930 by Miklós Horthy, Regent of Hungary. The award was re-established by the Hungarian government in 2001, but after the change of government in 2002, no one was awarded the Corvin chain, the reason given being that it was reminiscent of the Horthy era and the way it was awarded was criticised. Two years after the change of government in 2010, the award was re-issued in 2012.

According to Annex 2 of Act CCII of 2011 on the Use of the Coat of Arms and Flag of Hungary and State Honours, the number of recipients of the Corvin chain may not exceed fifteen at any one time. In 2012, five people were awarded the award, bringing the total number of recipients to 13, and since 2013 it has fallen to 12.

According to Government Decree No. 86/2012 (26.4.2012), the award is the property of the State.

== History ==
The original Corvin Chain was founded by Miklós Horthy in 1930. It was awarded to those who had made outstanding contributions to Hungarian science, literature and art, and to the promotion of Hungarian culture. The number of living recipients of the Corvin Chain could not exceed twelve at any one time. Later, after the reannexation of Northern Transylvania, this quota was increased by another three. This brought the total number of wearers to fifteen. Other decorations were also established: the Corvin badge, which could also be worn by 12 people, and the Corvin wreath, which could be worn by 60 people. The Corvin badge was also awarded to foreigners.

== Establishment ==
Extract from the text of the current regulation:

"Decree 2/2001 (VIII. 14.) ME on the foundation and statutes of the Hungarian Corvin Chain of Honour.

On the basis of the authorisation granted by Article 6/B of Act XXXI of 1991 on the Honours of the Republic of Hungary, I hereby decree the following:

§ I hereby establish the Hungarian Corvin Chain Medal (hereinafter referred to as "the Medal") in recognition of outstanding merit in the field of Hungarian science and art, and in the promotion of Hungarian education and culture.

§ I hereby establish the procedure and conditions for the awarding of the Medal, the description of the Medal, the rights and obligations associated with the Medal, and the basic rules for the establishment and operation of the Hungarian Corvin Chain Board, as set out in the Statutes of the Medal. The Statutes are annexed to this Regulation.

§ The Ministry of National Cultural Heritage shall ensure the coverage of the costs related to the implementation of this Decree from 1 January 2002."

"Act CCII of 2011 on the Use of the Coat of Arms and Flag of Hungary and on State Honours

Article 15 (1) The Hungarian Corvin Chain (hereinafter referred to as "Corvin Chain") shall be awarded in recognition of outstanding merit in the field of Hungarian science and art, and in the promotion of Hungarian education and culture. Keyword

(2) The recipients of the Corvin Chain shall constitute the Hungarian Corvin Chain Board (hereinafter referred to as the Corvin Chain Board).

(3)* The tasks related to the Corvin Chain shall be performed by the Hungarian Corvin Chain Office (hereinafter referred to as the Corvin Chain Office), which shall be located in the Ministry headed by the Minister responsible for the coordination of government activities.

Article 18 (1) State decorations of Hungary shall be awarded by the President of the Republic on the proposal of the Prime Minister."

== Insignia ==
The pendant on the chain is a copy of a 35 millimetre-thick medal made by a 15th century Italian Renaissance artist. The obverse is framed on the right and left by female figures standing on dolphins. It features a bust of King Matthias in profile on the right, surrounded by the Latin inscription "Mathias Rex Hungariae" (Matthias, King of Hungary). Above the ornate medal is the enamelled coat of arms of Matthias in a golden wreath. The whole hangs on a gold-plated silver necklace 510 millimetres long with a berry decoration. The medal is linked to the chain by a fruit basket and the enamelled coat of arms of King Matthias in a golden wreath. The chain is 510 millimetres long, made of silver and enamel.

The reestablished medal is identical to the original 1930 one, except that it is inscribed "Pro scientia - litteris - et artibus" (For science, literature and the arts).

== Statutes ==
The Hungarian Corvin Chain (hereinafter: the award) is conferred by the President of the Republic on the occasion of national holidays to Hungarian and foreign citizens who have made outstanding contributions to Hungarian science and art, education and culture. The award may be conferred only once on the same person.

The number of recipients may not exceed fifteen at any one time. Once the number of recipients reaches fifteen, no further award may be made unless the number of recipients is reduced by at least one.

The medal entitles its recipient to participate as an invited guest at central state ceremonies held on national and state holidays of the Republic of Hungary, as well as at events of outstanding importance not considered national and state holidays. He is also entitled to hold the medal for the rest of his life and to be known as the holder of the Hungarian Corvin chain.

The right to hold the medal shall cease if the donor dies, if a decision prohibiting the donor from exercising public office becomes final, or if the donor renounces the medal.

The donation shall be recorded by engraving the name of the donor and the date of the donation on the reverse of the medal.

If more than one name can no longer be engraved on the reverse of the same medal, the medal may not be presented more than once, and the words "Closed" shall be engraved on the reverse and handed over to the Hungarian National Museum as the institution entitled to keep and exhibit the medal.

== Board of the Hungarian Corvin Chain ==
The Hungarian Corvin Chain Board (hereinafter referred to as the Board) is a public body consisting of the members defined in Article 15 (2) of Act CCII of 2011 on the use of the coat of arms and flag of Hungary and on state decorations. Membership of the Public Body shall be established upon the award of the Hungarian Corvin Chain Medal and shall terminate upon the termination of the right to hold the Hungarian Corvin Chain Medal.

The supreme body of the Board is the General Assembly consisting of the members of the Board. The General Assembly shall elect a President and a vice president from among the members of the Board. The Board shall be represented by its president. The President shall exercise the rights of employer over the persons employed by the Board. The basic rules for the operation of the Board are laid down in the Statutes. The secretariat of the Hungarian Corvin Chain Board, acting as the Chairman's office, shall perform the official tasks related to the operation of the Board.

The Board shall work for the promotion of the sciences and arts, Hungarian national education and culture, and shall guard the prestige of the award, and shall give an opinion on the question whether the person proposed for consideration for the award of the Hungarian Corvin Chain is worthy and deserving of the award. On special request, it shall express its opinion on draft State decisions concerning Hungarian science, literature, art, education, culture and any other field of activity it considers important. In addition to the above, it monitors the situation of Hungarian science, art, education and culture and may make proposals of public interest and publish public statements. The Board may operate a scholarship programme to support persons of outstanding talent in their field.

== Office of the Hungarian Corvin Chain ==
The functions of the Hungarian Corvin Chain Office (hereinafter referred to as the Office) are carried out by the Cabinet of the Prime Minister. The Bureau is responsible for the administrative work related to the awarding of the medal, the production, replacement and repair of the medal, and the secretariat tasks related to the operation of the Board.

Chair:

- 2001-2002: Mária Schmidt
- 2011-2016: György Granasztói
- 2017–present : István Klinghammer

== List of members ==
Year	Name	Notes
2018	Péter Huszti (1944– )	
2018	Miklós Maróth (1943– )	
2018	János Martonyi (1944– )	
2018	Miklós Melocco (1935– )	
2018	György Radda (1936–2024 )	
2018	Zsigmond Ritoók (1929– )	
2018	Péter Sótonyi (1938– )	
2012	Zsolt Bor (1949– )	
2012	István Jelenits (1932– )	
2012	Zoltán Kocsis (1952–2016)	
2012	Éva Márton (1943– )	
2012	Szilveszter E. Vizi (1936– )	
2001	János Balógh (1913–2002)	
2001	Zoltán Kallós (1926–2018)	
2001	Alexandre Lámfalussy (1929–2015)	
2001	László Lovász (1948– )	
2001	János Lukács (1924–2019)	
2001	Imre Makovecz (1935–2011)	
2001	István Nemeskürty (1925–2015)	
2001	Gyögy Oláh (1927–2017)	
2001	Magda Szabó (1917–2007)	
2001	Sándor Szokolay (1931–2013)	
2001	Edward Teller (1908–2003)	
2001	Vilmos Zsigmond (1930–2016)	
