= Decoration of the Hungarian Red Cross =

Decoration of the Hungarian Red Cross Magyar Vöröskereszt Díszjelvénye
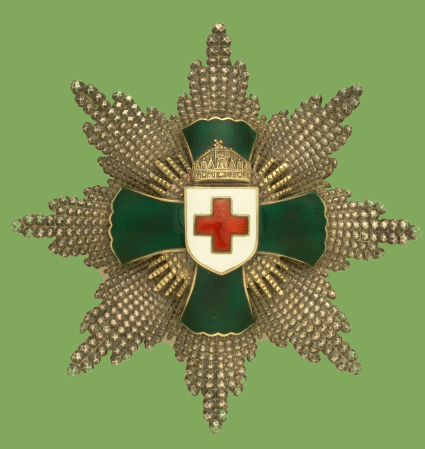
- Star of the Hungarian Red Cross
- Type: Military decoration
- Presented by: Hungary
- Eligibility: Individuals who worked in the voluntary emergency services of the Red Cross
- Established: 30. March 1922.
- Ribbon of Merit Medal, with war decoration

The Decoration of the Hungarian Red Cross (Magyar Vöröskereszt Díszjelvénye) was a Hungarian award instituted on 30 March 1922 by Regent Miklós Horthy to mark the 50th anniversary of the Geneva Convention. It was intended to honour individuals who had worked in the voluntary emergency services of the Red Cross, either in peacetime or in war. In 7. January 1938 the original 3 decorations were augmented with 2 medals, the Silver and the bronze medal. Because war was inevitable all classes received a war decoration sub-class.

The order consists of three classes, as well as an associated medal in two classes:

1st: Star, with and without war decoration
2nd: Merit Cross, with and without war decoration
3rd: Merit Medal, with and without war decoration
4th: Silver Medal, with and without war decoration
5th: Bronze Medal, with and without war decoration

Merit Cross of the Hungarian Red Cross	Merit Medal of the Hungarian Red Cross with war decoration	Silver Medal of the Hungarian Red Cross	Silver Medal of the Hungarian Red Cross with and without war decoration
