= George Dodd (footballer) =

English footballer

Personal information
- Full name: George Francis Dodd
- Date of birth: 16 December 1881 or 7 February 1885
- Date of death: 1 January 1960 (aged 78) or 1 January 1960 (aged 74)
- Height: 1.70 m (5 ft 7 in)
- Position: Forward

Senior career*
Years	Team	Apps	(Gls)
- Wallasey Village
- Liscard C.E.M.S.
- Birkenhead
1905–1907	Stockport County		
- Workington
- Notts County
1911–1913	Chelsea	29	(7)
- Millwall
- Brighton & Hove Albion
- Darlington
- Queens Park Rangers
- West Ham United
1919–1920	Luton Town	10	(4)
- Treherbert
- Charlton Athletic

Managerial career
- Catford South End
- * Club domestic league appearances and goals

George Francis (Note: Also possibly Frederick) Dodd (16 December 1881 – 1 January 1960) was an English footballer who played as a forward.

== Club career ==
Dodd played for a number of amateur clubs in England before joining Stockport County in 1905. While at the club, he scored the first goal ever against newly formed Chelsea; after Joseph Schofield's penalty was saved by William Foulke, Dodd scored the rebound. After two seasons with Stockport County, he moved on to Workington and then Notts County, before joining Chelsea in 1911. Having played for a number of professional clubs during the First World War, and also serving as a private in the British Army, he joined Luton Town in 1919, going on to score five goals in fourteen appearances in all competitions.

Following his retirement, he managed amateur side Catford South End.
