= Financial Services Action Plan =

The Financial Services Action Plan (FSAP) is a key component of the European Union's attempt to create a single market for financial services. Created in 1999 and lasting for six years, it contained 42 articles related to harmonising the financial services markets within the European Union. It was scheduled to be completed by the end of 2004.

== Description ==
The European Council held in Cardiff in June 1998 requested the European Commission "to table a framework for action....to improve the single market in financial services, in particular examining the effectiveness of implementation of current legislation and identifying weaknesses which may require amending legislation".

The European Commission responded with five imperatives for action, that were agreed upon at the Vienna European Council in December 1998. On 11 May 1999, the Commission issued the Financial Services Action Plan.

The Markets in Financial Instruments Directive (MIFID) is the cornerstone of the action plan's achievement.
