= Hungarian War Commemorative Medal =

- Type: Military commemorative medal
- Country: Kingdom of Hungary
- Eligibility: Veterans of World War I; war widows and orphans; civilians who served the war effort; foreign allied nationals
- Status: No longer awarded
- Established: 26 May 1929

The Hungarian War Commemorative Medal (Hungarian: Magyar Háborús Emlékérem) was a commemorative medal of the Kingdom of Hungary, established on 26 May 1929 by Miklós Horthy, Regent of Hungary, in a personal rescript addressed to Prime Minister Count István Bethlen. The statutes of the medal were approved by a further High Rescript dated 14 November 1929.

The medal was awarded to Hungarian military veterans of World War I, as well as to war widows, war orphans, civilians who contributed to the war effort, and, exceptionally, to individuals who demonstrated loyal service to the nation during and after the revolutionary period that followed the war. It existed in two classes, distinguished by the presence or absence of a steel helmet and crossed swords, denoting combatant and non-combatant service respectively.

The founding rescript was issued on the day of the dedication of the Heroes' Memorial (Hősi Emlékkő) in Budapest, at a ceremony commemorating Hungarian soldiers who died in defence of the country's historical borders during the 1914–1918 war.

The medal was designed by the Hungarian sculptor Zsigmond Kisfaludi Stróbl (1 July 1884 – 14 August 1975), who was himself a veteran of the First World War.

== History ==
Hungary's participation in World War I as part of Austria-Hungary resulted in approximately 660,000 military deaths and more than 700,000 prisoners of war. Following the war, the revolutions of 1918–1919 and the punitive terms of the Treaty of Trianon (1920) left Hungary greatly diminished in territory and population. The Horthy regime that consolidated power in the early 1920s promoted a conservative-nationalist ideology that emphasised loyalty to the pre-war kingdom and disdain for the revolutionary interlude.

In this context, Regent Horthy established the war commemorative medal as both a tribute to veterans and an explicit acknowledgement of loyalty during what the founding rescript described as the "mournful anti-national and anti-religious revolutionary times" following the war. The founding document made clear that the medal was intended not only for those who served militarily but also for those who had resisted the revolutionary movements.

The statutes were published simultaneously in the Budapesti Közlöny (Official Gazette) No. 262 of 1929 and in the Honvédségi Közlöny (Army Gazette) No. 30 of 1929.

== Description ==
=== Medal ===
The medal is a silvered and oxidised badge made of tombac, 37 mm (1.5 in) in diameter.

The obverse of the combatants' class depicts the Anjou-era coat of arms of Hungary, surmounted by the Holy Crown of Hungary. Below the escutcheon, two swords of the era of Saint Stephen are laid crosswise. The coat of arms is surrounded on the left by a wreath of laurel leaves, and on the right by a wreath of oak leaves.

The reverse bears, in the centre, a rohamsisak (assault helmet), below which appear the dates 1914–1918. Above, in a semicircular arc, is the Latin inscription PRO DEO ET PATRIA ("For God and Fatherland"). Below the helmet and dates, two palm branches are placed.

The obverse of the non-combatants' class is identical except that the crossed swords are omitted. The reverse likewise omits the helmet, retaining only the dates, the inscription, and the palm branches.

The medal is worn on the left breast, after the Karl Troop Cross or the Wound Medal, and before the military service badge.

A miniature version for wearing in the buttonhole was also issued, priced at 1 pengő for all recipients. Recipients were supplied with a certificate (*igazolvány*) of entitlement, issued by the Országos Vitézi Szék (National Order of Vitéz), which acted as the administrative office for the medal.

=== Ribbon ===
The medal is suspended from a triangular ribbon (*háromszögletű szalag*), in the Austrian tradition also used for the Karl Troop Cross.

The ribbon of the combatants' class is described in the statutes as the *piros-fehér-zöld színű hadi érem szalag* ("red-white-green coloured war medal ribbon"). It is white with two wide vertical red stripes near the edges, with thin horizontal green stripes placed between them.

The ribbon of the non-combatants' class is described as the *piros-fehér-zöld szegélyű szalag* ("ribbon with red-white-green edging"). It is white with two wide red stripes and two wide green stripes, without the thin horizontal green stripes of the combatants' version.

Recipients of the combatants' class could wear a special combat clasp in the form of two silvered crossed swords on the ribbon bar.

Combatants' class	Non-combatants' class

== Eligibility ==
The statutes established six categories of eligible recipients, divided between two classes of the medal.

The combatants' class (with sword and helmet) was awarded to:

(a) Those who performed actual military service with the field army or in the rear areas of the country in the 1914–18 war up to and including 30 October 1918.

The non-combatants' class (without sword and helmet) was awarded to:

(b) Those who received a high distinction for particularly effective work on behalf of the wounded, sick, and prisoners of war of the 1914–18 war, or to whom the decoration established "for merits around the Red Cross" was awarded.

(c) War widows and war orphans (eldest son only), as well as relatives whose breadwinner or direct lineal descendant died as a result of injury or damage to health arising from services closely connected with the 1914–18 war.

(d) Civilian persons who, in the 1914–18 war up to and including 30 October 1918, performed state or equivalent service with the field army or in rear areas, and by their activities promoted the interests of the armed forces — including administration, post, telegraph, railway, shipping, and war industry.

(e) Exceptionally, those who during and after the war and revolutionary period were ardent champions of national ideals rooted in Hungary's thousand-year traditions, with steadfast faith in God and self-sacrificing loyalty to the homeland.

(f) Citizens of states allied with Hungary in the 1914–18 war who participated in the war, awarded upon submission by the Royal Hungarian Minister of Foreign Affairs.

Where a person was eligible under both classes, only the combatants' class could be claimed. The Head of State was declared a holder of the medal by virtue of office.

=== Application process ===
Applications were fee-exempt (*illetékmentes*). Veterans and active military personnel submitted applications through military channels to the Minister of Defence; civilians applied through local administrative authorities, with applications passing through county (*vármegye*) offices and the relevant vitézi szék (Order of Vitéz captaincy) before reaching the Országos Vitézi Szék in Budapest.

The medal and certificate of entitlement were issued only after payment of the prescribed production and handling fee (*előállítási és kezelési költség*):

- Officers and equivalent: 6 pengő
- Other ranks and equivalent: 3 pengő
- War widows, war orphans, and those eligible under category (c): 2 pengő
- Other non-combatant categories, including foreign nationals: 15 pengő
- Miniature buttonhole version (all categories): 1 pengő

In exceptional cases the Minister of Defence could, on the recommendation of the Országos Vitézi Szék, waive the fee.

== See also ==
- War Commemorative Medal (Austria)
- Karl Troop Cross
- Wound Medal (Austria-Hungary)
- Order of Vitéz
- Zsigmond Kisfaludi Stróbl
- Kingdom of Hungary (1920–1946)
- Miklós Horthy
- István Bethlen
