= Orders, decorations, and medals of the Hungarian People's Republic =

The following is a list of Orders, decorations, and medals of the Hungarian People's Republic. The state awards may be awarded only by the Chairmen of the Presidential Council. The following honours were in order of precedence.

List of wear Orders, decorations, and medals of the Hungarian People's Republic in 1989.

Ribbon	Name of orders and medals	Description	Established
	Hero of Socialist Labour of Hungary	It represented the highest degree of distinction in the Hungarian People's Republic and was awarded for exceptional achievements in the industry and culture.	1953
	Hero of Socialist Labour of Hungary	It represented the highest degree of distinction in the Hungarian People's Republic and was awarded for exceptional achievements in the industry and culture.	1964
	Order of the Flag of the Hungarian People's Republic with Diamonds	Awarded for "work done in the fight for peace or in building the country, as well as in the development of cooperation and friendly relations between Hungary and foreign states, and for the consolidation of international peace and friendship". The Order originally had five Classes, the 4th and 5th being abolished in 1963.	1956
	Hero of the Hungarian People's Republic	In recognition of outstanding heroic conduct in the armed service of the homeland and merit achieved through space flight.	1979
	Order of Merit of the People's Republic of Hungary		1953
	Order of Merit of the People's Republic of Hungary		1957
	Peace and Friendship Order of Merit		1957
	Order the Labour of the Red Banner		1953
	Order of the Flag of the Hungarian People's Republic with Rubies	Awarded for "work done in the fight for peace or in building the country, as well as in the development of cooperation and friendly relations between Hungary and foreign states, and for the consolidation of international peace and friendship". The Order originally had five Classes, the 4th and 5th being abolished in 1963.	1956
	Order of the Flag of the Hungarian People's Republic with Laurel Wreath	Awarded for "work done in the fight for peace or in building the country, as well as in the development of cooperation and friendly relations between Hungary and foreign states, and for the consolidation of international peace and friendship". The Order originally had five Classes, the 4th and 5th being abolished in 1963.	1956
	Order of the Flag of the Hungarian People's Republic with Gold-Wreath	Awarded for "work done in the fight for peace or in building the country, as well as in the development of cooperation and friendly relations between Hungary and foreign states, and for the consolidation of international peace and friendship". The Order originally had five Classes, the 4th and 5th being abolished in 1963.	1956
	Order of Merit for Socialist Homeland		1953
	Order of Merit of the Hungarian People's Republic 1st class		24 October 1949
	Order of Kossuth; 1st Class		1946
	Order the Red Star		1957
	Order of Merit of the Hungarian People's Republic 2nd class		24 October 1949
	Order of Merit of Hungarian Freedom Silver class		1946
	Order of Merit of Hungarian Freedom Silver class		1957
	Order of Kossuth; 2nd Class		1946
	For the Worker-Peasant Power Memorial Medal		1957
	Order of Merit for Socialist Hungary		1976
	Order of the Star of the Hungarian People's Republic with Golden Wreath		1984
	Order of the Star of the Hungarian People's Republic with Swords		1984
	Fourth of April Order of Merit		1984
	Gold class of the Order of Labour		1953
	Order of Merit of the Hungarian People's Republic 3rd class		24 October 1949
	Order of Kossuth; 3rd Class		1946
	Order of the Star of the Hungarian People's Republic		1984
	Order of Merit of the Hungarian People's Republic 4th class		24 October 1949
	Order of Merit of Hungarian Freedom Silver class		1946
	Order of Merit of Hungarian Freedom Silver class		1957
	Silver class of the Order of Labour		1953
	Order of Merit of the Hungarian People's Republic 5th class		24 October 1949
	Medal of Merit of the Hungarian People's Republic Silver class		1949
	Bronze class of the Order of Labour		1953
	Meritorious Service Medal		1957
	Merit Medal of Labour		1954
	Hungarian People's Republic Medal of Sports Merit Gold class		1949
	Medal of Merit of the Order of Labour		1953
	Medal of Merit of the Hungarian People's Republic Silver class		1949
	Hungarian People's Republic Medal of Sports Merit Silver class		1949
	Medal of Merit of the Hungarian People's Republic Bronze class		1949
	Hungarian People's Republic Medal of Sports Merit Bronze class		1949
	Honorary Medal of the 48th		1948
	Commemorative Medal of the Hungarian Soviet Republic		1959
	Liberation Jubilee Commemorative Medal		1969
	Medal of Merit for Armed Service to the Homeland 4000 parachute jumps		12 October 1964
	Medal of Merit for Armed Service to the Homeland 4000 hours of flying		12 October 1964
	Medal of Merit for Armed Service to the Homeland 45 years service		12 October 1964
	National Defense Merit Medal 45 years service		12 October 1964
	Medal of Merit for Armed Service to the Homeland 3500 parachute jumps		12 October 1964
	Medal of Merit for Armed Service to the Homeland 3500 hours of flying		12 October 1964
	Medal of Merit for Armed Service to the Homeland 40 years service		12 October 1964
	National Defense Merit Medal 40 years service		12 October 1964
	Gold Medal of Merit for Service to the Country		12 October 1964
	Medal of Merit for Armed Service to the Homeland 3000 parachute jumps		12 October 1964
	Medal of Merit for Armed Service to the Homeland 3000 hours of flying		12 October 1964
	Medal of Merit for Armed Service to the Homeland 35 years service		12 October 1964
	National Defense Merit Medal 35 years service		12 October 1964
	Silver Medal of Merit for Service to the Country		12 October 1964
	Medal of Merit for Armed Service to the Homeland 2500 parachute jumps		12 October 1964
	Medal of Merit for Armed Service to the Homeland 2500 hours of flying		12 October 1964
	Medal of Merit for Armed Service to the Homeland 30 years service		12 October 1964
	National Defense Merit Medal 30 years service		12 October 1964
	Bronze Medal of Merit for Service to the Country		12 October 1964
	Medal of Merit for Armed Service to the Homeland 2000 parachute jumps		12 October 1964
	Medal of Merit for Armed Service to the Homeland 2000 hours of flying		12 October 1964
	Medal of Merit for Armed Service to the Homeland 25 years service		12 October 1964
	National Defense Merit Medal 25 years service		12 October 1964
	Medal of Merit for Armed Service to the Homeland 1500 parachute jumps		12 October 1964
	Medal of Merit for Armed Service to the Homeland 1500 hours of flying		12 October 1964
	Medal of Merit for Armed Service to the Homeland 20 years service		12 October 1964
	National Defense Merit Medal 20 years service		12 October 1964
	Medal of Merit for Armed Service to the Homeland 1000 parachute jumps		12 October 1964
	Medal of Merit for Armed Service to the Homeland 1000 hours of flying		12 October 1964
	Medal of Merit for Armed Service to the Homeland 15 years service		12 October 1964
	National Defense Merit Medal 15 years service		12 October 1964
	Medal of Merit for Armed Service to the Homeland 500 parachute jumps		12 October 1964
	Medal of Merit for Armed Service to the Homeland 500 hours of flying		12 October 1964
	Medal of Merit for Armed Service to the Homeland 10 years service		12 October 1964
	National Defense Merit Medal 10 years service		12 October 1964
	Public Security Service Gold class		1951
	Fire Service Medal Gold class		1951
	Fire Service Medal Silver class		12 October 1956
	Fire Service Medal Silver class		1974
	Public Security Service Silver class		1951
	Fire Service Medal Silver class		1951
	Fire Service Medal Silver class		12 October 1956
	Fire Service Medal Silver class		1974
	Public Security Service Bronze class		1951
	Fire Service Medal Bronze class		1951
	Fire Service Medal Bronze class		12 October 1956
	Fire Service Medal Bronze class		1974
	Service Medal for Flood Protection		

== See also ==
- History of Hungary
- List of military decorations
- Orders, decorations, and medals of Hungary

== Sources ==
- Dr. Besnyő, Károly (1979). A Magyar Népköztársaság kitüntetései. lektorálta: Dr. Czilczer György. Budapest: Közgazdasági és Jogi Könyvkiadó.
- A Magyar Népköztársaság Elnöki Tanácsának kitüntetései. Budapest: Kossuth Könyvkiadó. 1979.
- The Journal of the Orders & Medals Research Society · Volumes 3-5, page 2. and 5. University of Michigan. 1964.
