= Hungarian Order of Merit =

Honorary order of Hungary (1991–)

- Knight's Cross of the Hungarian Order of Merit (Civil)

Awarded by President of Hungary
- Type: State decoration
- Established: 1991; 35 years ago
- Status: Currently constituted

Statistics
- First induction: 1991

Precedence
- Next (higher): Hungarian Order of Honour
- Next (lower): Hungarian Cross of Merit
- Grand Cross with Chain Grand Cross Commander's Cross with Star Commander's Cross Officer's Cross Knight's Cross; Ribbon bars and classes of the Hungarian Order of Merit (Civil)

The Hungarian Order of Merit (Hungarian: Magyar Érdemrend) is the fourth highest State Order of Hungary. Founded in 1991, the order is a revival of an original order founded in 1946 and abolished in 1949. Its origins, however, can be traced to the Order of Merit of the Kingdom of Hungary which existed from 1922 until 1946.

In 2011 its official name changed from Order of Merit of the Republic of Hungary to Hungarian Order of Merit in accordance with the new Hungarian Constitution. It is awarded in either civilian or military divisions.

Since 2011, the Hungarian Order of Saint Stephen is the highest State honour of Hungary.

== Grades ==
The civil division is divided into six grades, whilst the military division is divided into five. The highest grade, the Grand Cross with Chain, is exclusive to the civilian division and is only awarded to heads of state and the President of Hungary ex-officio. The maximum number of awards which are permitted to be made to Hungarian citizens per year is subject to the grade in the following fashion:

Grand Cross: 5

Commander's Cross with Star: 20

Commander's Cross: 40

Officer's Cross: 140

Knight's Cross: 300

=== Guide on how to wear different classes of the order ===
Grades
Knight's Cross	Officer's Cross	Commander's Cross	Commander's Cross with Star	Grand Cross	Grand Cross with Chain

== Insignia ==
=== Civil Division ===
Grand Cross with Chain			
Grand Cross with Chain	Chain	Star	Alternative Medal
Grand Cross			
Grand Cross	Sash	Star	Alternative Medal
Commander's Cross with Star			
Commander's Cross with Star	Cross	Star	Alternative Medal
Commander's Cross			
Commander's Cross	Cross	Alternative Medal	
Officer's Cross			
Officer's Cross	Cross		
Knight's Cross			
Knight's Cross	Cross		

=== Military Division ===
Grand Cross			
Grand Cross	Sash	Star	Alternative Medal
Commander's Cross with Star			
Commander's Cross with Star	Cross	Star	Alternative Medal
Commander's Cross			
Commander's Cross	Cross	Alternative Medal	
Officer's Cross			
Officer's Cross	Cross		
Knight's Cross			
Knight's Cross	Cross		

- The medal of the Order is made on the features of the ancient Royal Order of Saint Stephen of Hungary: it consists of a white-enamelled cross edged with green, showing a central circular medallion enamelled in red showing the coat of arms of Hungary, surrounded by a wreath of green enamel.
- The star takes up the shape of the medal but is mounted on a golden radiant star.
- The ribbon is green with a red stripe and a white stripe for the civil class, while it is red with a green stripe and a white stripe for the military class.

== Sources ==
- State Decorations, Office of the President of Hungary
- Hungary: Hungarian Order of Merit (Civilian), Medals of the World
- 1991 XXXI law enacting the order
- 2011 CCII. law enacting the order
