= Lamfalussy process =

Legislative process

The Lamfalussy process is an approach to the development of financial service industry regulations used by the European Union. Originally developed in March 2001, the process is named after the chair of the EU advisory committee that created it, Alexandre Lamfalussy. It is composed of four "levels", each focusing on a specific stage of the implementation of legislation.

At the first level, the European Parliament and Council of the European Union adopt a piece of legislation, establishing the core values of a law and building guidelines on its implementation. The law then progresses to the second level, where sector-specific committees and regulators advise on technical details, then bring it to a vote in front of member-state representatives. At the third level, national regulators work on coordinating new regulations with other nations. The fourth level involves compliance and enforcement of the new rules and laws.

The Lamfalussy process has provided a significant impetus in delivering successful agreements on four key measures of the Financial Services Action Plan: the Market Abuse Directive, adopted on 3 December 2002; the Prospectus Directive, adopted on 15 July 2003; the Markets in Financial Instruments Directive (MiFID), adopted on 27 April 2004 and the Transparency Directive, adopted in 2004.

The Lamfalussy Process is intended to provide several benefits over traditional lawmaking, including more-consistent interpretation, convergence in national supervisory practices, and a general boost in the quality of legislation on financial services.

Nevertheless, the Lamfalussy Process has provoked controversy as it allows some element of bypassing accountable oversight by the Council of the European Union and the elected European Parliament, thereby embodying a further move away from representative democracy towards technocracy.

The creation of the European System of Financial Supervision (ESMA, EIOPA and EBA), which took over from the Advisory Committees on 1 January 2011, has resulted in some changes regarding how the four level legislative procedure operates, with that system being given a greater role and more powers.
