= George H. Dodd =

Biochemist

- Born: About 1942; Dublin
- Died: 14 December 2020
- Education: Trinity College Dublin, University of Oxford (D.Phil.)
- Known for: Studies of olfaction
- Scientific career
- Fields: Biochemistry
- Institutions: Unilever, University of Warwick
- Doctoral advisor: George Radda

George H Dodd was a biochemist who specialised in the study and production of perfumes and pheromones. He died on 14th December 2020.

== Career ==
George Dodd studied at Trinity College Dublin, and obtained his D.Phil. at Oxford under the supervision of George Radda; his thesis described studies structural transitions of the enzyme glutamate dehydrogenase using new methods based on fluorescence spectroscopy. He worked at Unilever before joining the University of Warwick in 1971. There he returned to his lifelong interest in olfaction, writing, for example, on the effect of odorants on enzyme activity. After leaving Warwick in 1994 he founded a smell biotechnology company, Kiotech and later opened “The Perfume Studio”.
