= George Dodd (English writer) =

English journalist and writer

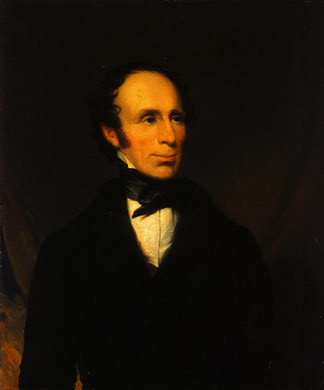
Portrait of George Dodd by John Neagle (circa 1852)

George Dodd (18 September 1808 – 21 January 1881) was an English journalist and writer. His best known work was The Food of London (1856).

== Works ==
Dodd worked as assistant to Charles Knight, particularly on the presentation of statistics.

=== Encyclopedias ===
Dodd wrote articles on industrial art in the Penny Cyclopædia, the English Cyclopædia and supplements. He edited and wrote in the Cyclopædia of the Industry of all Nations (1851).

=== Periodicals ===
Dodd contributed to Knight's serial publications: the Penny Magazine, London, The Land we live in, and others. When Knight retired as a general publisher, Dodd became associated with Messrs. Chambers, and contributed to their serial publications. For over thirty years he contributed one or more papers to the Companion to the Almanac.

Another periodical to which Dodd contributed was Household Words, run by Charles Dickens. Dickens found Dodd useful, but at times close to a hack writer. Some recycling of his article material as books, and vice versa, has been shown.

=== Books ===
For Knight's Weekly Volumes Dodd wrote The Textile Manufactures of Great Britain (British Manufactures. Chemical.—Metals. —British Manufactures, Series 4–6), (6 vols. 1844–6). The work by which he was probably best known was The Food of London; a sketch of the chief varieties, sources of supply … and machinery of distribution, of the food for a community of two millions and a half (1856).

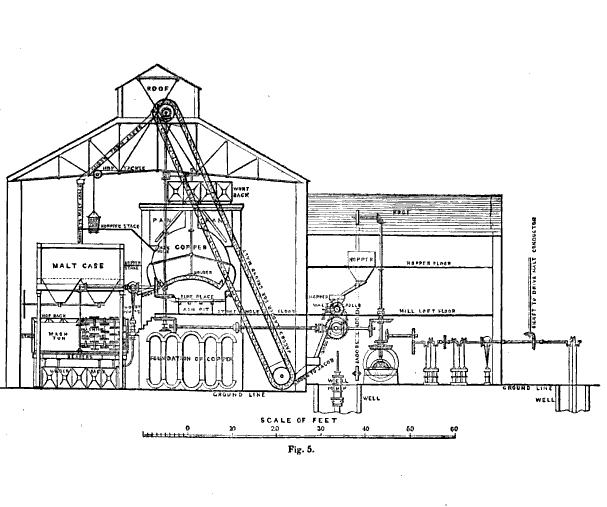
Illustration of a brewery from George Dodd's Days at the Factories (1843)

Some of Dodd's articles were collected and published in volumes, under the titles of Days at the Factories (1843) and Curiosities of Industry (1852). He also compiled Chambers's Handy Guide to London (1862) and Chambers's Handy Guide to the Kent and Sussex Coasts (1863). His other books were:

- Rudimentary Treatise on the Construction of Locks, from materials furnished by Alfred Charles Hobbs; compiled by Dodd, edited by Charles Tomlinson, 1853.
- Pictorial History of the Russian War, 1854–5–6.
- A Chronicle of the Indian Revolt and of the Expeditions to Persia, China, and Japan, 1856–7–8.
- Where do we get it, and how is it made? A familiar account of the mode of supplying our every-day wants, comforts, and luxuries. … With illustrations by W. Harvey [1862].
- Railways, Steamers, and Telegraphs; a glance at their recent progress and present state, Edinburgh, 1867.
- Dictionary of Manufactures, Mining, Machinery, and the Industrial Arts, [1871].
