= Hungarian Cross of Merit =

5th highest state order of Hungary

Awarded by President of Hungary
- Type: State decoration
- Established: 1991; 35 years ago
- Status: Currently constituted
- Classes: Gold Cross; Silver Cross; Bronze Cross

Statistics
- First induction: 1991

Precedence
- Next (higher): Hungarian Order of Merit
- Next (lower): none

The Hungarian Cross of Merit (Hungarian: Magyar Érdemkereszt) is the fifth highest state decoration of Hungary. Until 2011, the order was called the Cross of Merit of the Republic of Hungary. A maximum of 250 awards from each class are permitted to be awarded to Hungarians per year.

== Classes ==
The decoration comes in civil and military divisions, both of which are divided into three classes.

Ribbon bars of the Hungarian Cross of Merit
Class	Civil	Military
Gold Cross		
Silver Cross		
Bronze Cross		

== Insignia ==
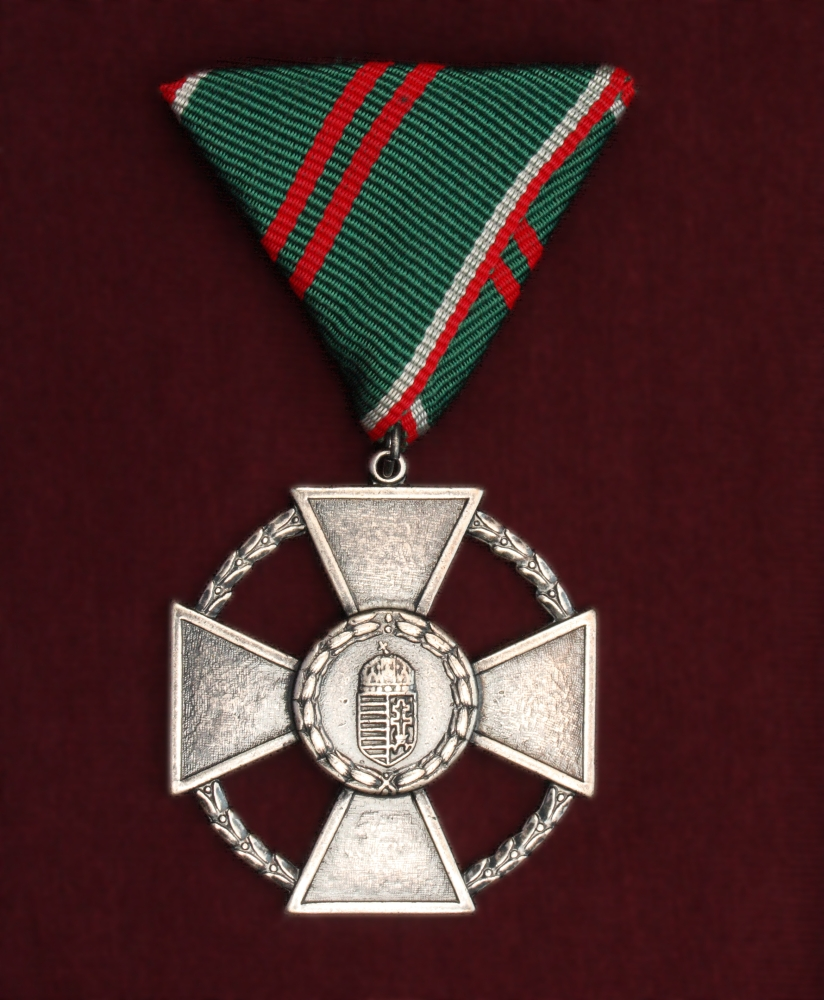
Silver Cross of the Hungarian Cross of Merit

The order's insignia is composed of a 42mm diameter widening banded cross with a stylised laurel wreath between the stems (2mm). Its central field, also surrounded by a laurel wreath, bears the coat of arms of the Hungarian Republic of 1990 on the obverse and the years "1946/1991" on the reverse. The cross is plated in gold, silver or bronze according to the grade.

== Sources ==
- State Decorations, Office of the President of Hungary
- Hungary: Hungarian Order of Merit (Civilian), Medals of the World
- 1991 XXXI law enacting the order
