= Hungarian Order of Saint Stephen =

Hungarian state honour

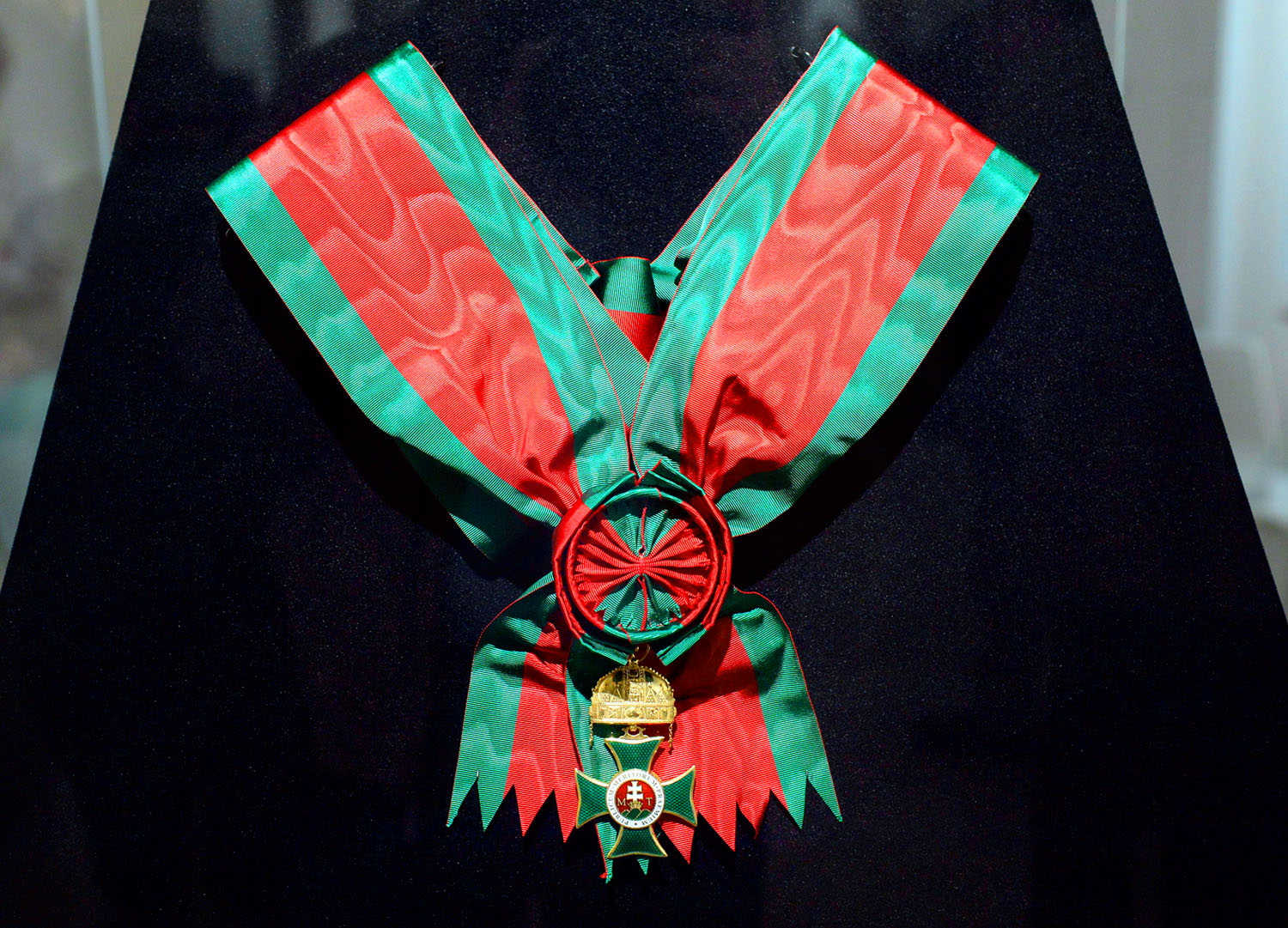
- Sash of the Hungarian Order of Saint Stephen

Awarded by President of Hungary
- Type: State decoration
- Established: 2011; 15 years ago
- Motto: Publicum meritorum praemium (Award for public service)
- Eligibility: Awarded in recognition of the most special merits, outstanding life's work and significant international achievements in the service of Hungary.
- Status: Currently constituted

Statistics
- First induction: 2013

Precedence
- Next (higher): none
- Next (lower): Hungarian Corvin Chain
- Ribbon bar of the Hungarian Order of Saint Stephen

The Hungarian Order of Saint Stephen (Hungarian: Magyar Szent István Rend) is the highest state honour bestowed by the President of Hungary. The order is made up of one grade and is awarded in recognition of the most special merits, outstanding life's work and significant international achievements in the service of Hungary. A maximum of 3 awards are permitted to be awarded to Hungarians per year.

== History ==
The order's origins can be traced back to an order of chivalry founded in 1764 by Queen Maria Theresa which lasted until the dissolution of Austria-Hungary in 1918. The order was subsequently revived in 1938 following a decree by Hungary's Regent Miklós Horthy, thereby renaming the order as the Royal Hungarian Order of Saint Stephen (German: Königlich Ungarischer Sankt-Stephans-Orden, Latin: Ordo Equitum Sancti Stephani Regis (Hungariae) Apostolici) and acting as its Grand Master. Following the proclamation of the Second Hungarian Republic in 1946, the order was terminated. Finally, in 2011, the order was revived by Presidential decree as the Hungarian Order of Saint Stephen.

== Insignia ==
The insignia included in the presentation box, from left-to-right & top-to-bottom, feature:

1. Breast star
2. Sash
3. Ribbon bar
4. Miniature
5. Alternative medal
6. Rosette
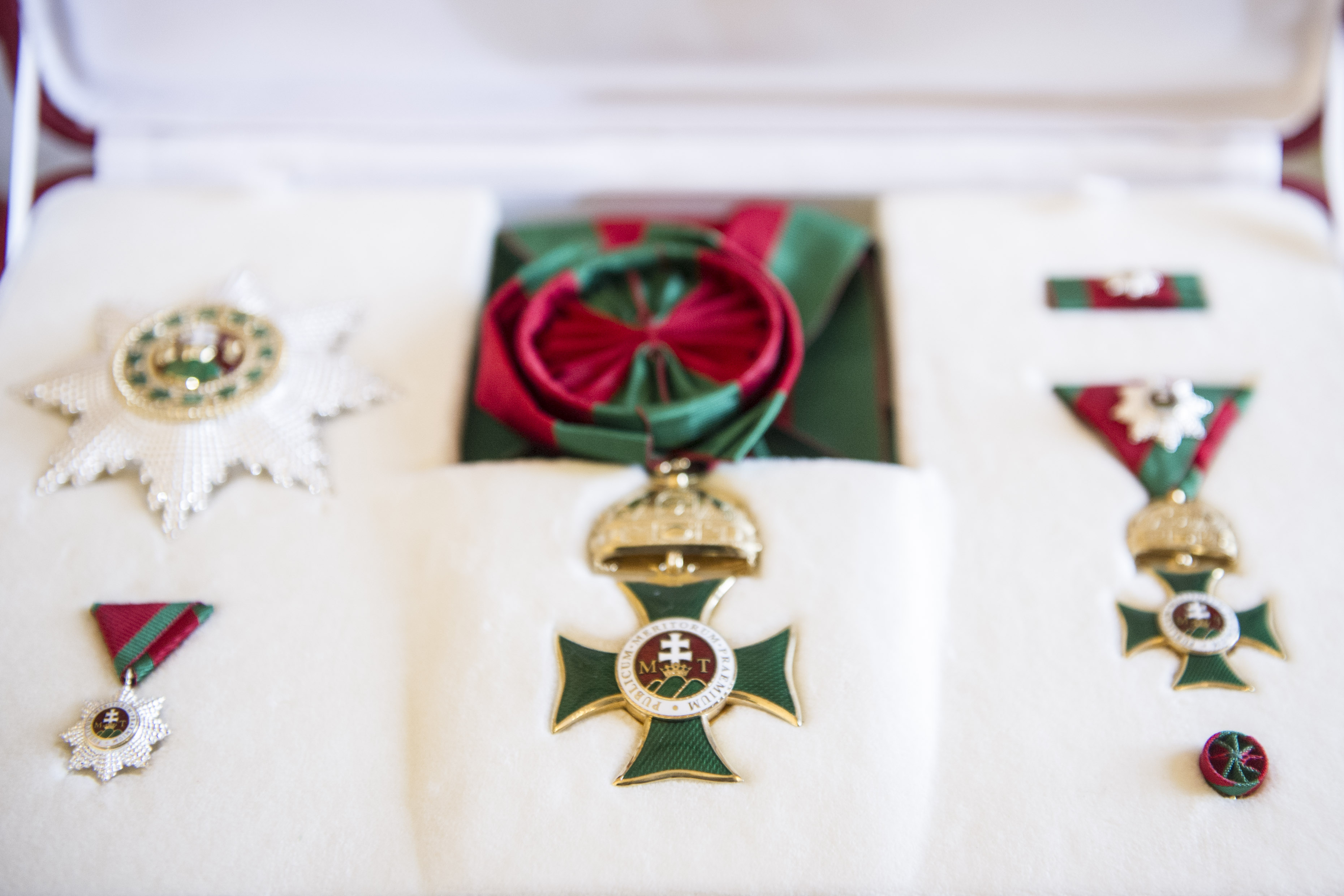
Male insignia of the order

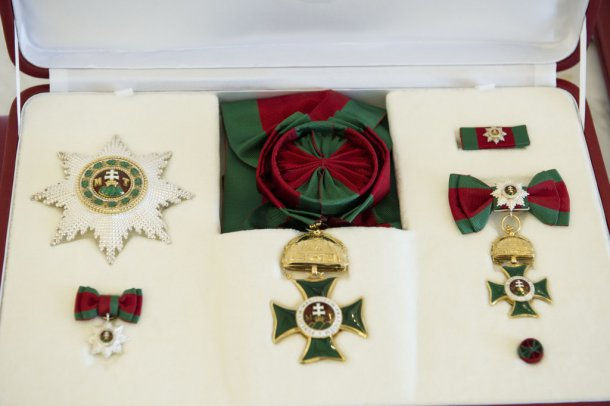
Female insignia of the order

== List of members ==
Year	Name	Notes
2026	András Baka	President of Hungary. According to the Constitution of Hungary's CCII/2011 law the president of Hungary receives the Hungarian Order of Saint Stephen ex-officio.
2025	Bertalan Farkas	Hungarian cosmonaut (Soyuz 35 and 36) and the first Hungarian in space.
2025	Tibor Kapu	Hungarian astronaut (Axiom 4).
2024	Ferenc Krausz	Hungarian physicist awarded the 2023 Nobel Prize in Physics.
2024	Tamás Sulyok	President of Hungary. According to the Constitution of Hungary's CCII/2011 law the president of Hungary receives the Hungarian Order of Saint Stephen ex-officio.
2023	Sándor Csányi	Hungarian billionaire businessman and banker. He is the chairman and chief executive officer (CEO) of OTP Bank Group
2023	Áron Szilágyi	Hungarian right-handed sabre fencer. He is a three-time individual Olympic champion and 2021 team Olympic bronze medalist.
2023	Katalin Karikó	Hungarian-American biochemist who won also the Széchenyi Prize in 2021. As a result of her pioneering work, she was awarded the Nobel Prize in Physiology or Medicine in 2023, along with American immunologist Drew Weissman.
2022	Ferenc Rofusz	Hungarian animator. He is known for the 1980 Academy Award-winning animated short The Fly.
2022	Erika Miklósa	Hungarian coloratura soprano.
2022	Katalin Novák	President of Hungary. According to the Constitution of Hungary's CCII/2011 law the president of Hungary receives the Hungarian Order of Saint Stephen ex-officio.
2021	László Lovász	Hungarian mathematician and professor emeritus at Eötvös Loránd University, best known for his work in combinatorics. Kyoto Prize 2010, Abel Prize 2021
2021	Szilveszter E. Vizi	Hungarian physician, neuroscientist, pharmacologist and university professor who served as President of the Hungarian Academy of Sciences between 2002 and 2008.
2020	Endre Szemerédi	Hungarian-American mathematician and computer scientist, working in the field of combinatorics and theoretical computer science.
2019	Botond Roska	Hungarian neurobiologist. He and his team discovered the basic principles of visual information processing and the development of therapeutic strategies, such as gene therapy, to restore vision in retinal disorders.
2018	Paul Demeny	Hungarian demographer. He invented the concept of the Demeny voting system.
2017	Tamás Vásáry	Hungarian concert pianist and conductor. He was the artistic director of the Royal Northern Sinfonia from 1979 to 1982, sharing the post with Iván Fischer. He was later Principal Conductor of the Bournemouth Sinfonietta, from 1989 to 1997. Between 1993 and 2004: Principal Conductor of the Hungarian Radio Symphony Orchestra.
2017	Péter Erdő	Hungarian cardinal, Roman Catholic Archdiocese of Esztergom-Budapest professor and former rector of the Pázmány Péter Catholic University.
2016	Ádám Makkai	Two-time recipient of the Kossuth Prize, poet, linguist, translator, retired professor emeritus of the University of Illinois.
2016	Éva Marton	Hungarian dramatic soprano, known for her operatic portrayals of Puccini's Turandot and Tosca, and Wagnerian roles.
2015	Péter Eötvös	Hungarian composer and conductor.
2015	Judit Polgár	Hungarian chess grandmaster.
2014	Ernő Rubik	Hungarian inventor, architect and professor of architecture. He is best known for the invention of mechanical puzzles including Rubik's Cube (1974), Rubik's Magic, Rubik's Magic: Master Edition, and Rubik's Snake.
2014	Imre Kertész	Hungarian author, Holocaust concentration camp survivor, and recipient of the 2002 Nobel Prize in Literature.
2013	Alexandre Lamfalussy	Hungarian-born Belgian economist and central banker.
2013	Krisztina Egerszegi	Hungarian former world record holding swimmer. She is a three-time Olympian (1988, 1992 and 1996) and five-time Olympic champion.
2012	János Áder	President of Hungary. According to the Constitution of Hungary's CCII/2011 law the president of Hungary receives the Hungarian Order of Saint Stephen ex-officio.
