= European Securities Committee =

The European Securities Committee (ESC) advises the European Commission in the field of securities.

The ESC held its first meeting in September 2001. It is run by the European Commission and usually meets each month. It assists the Commission in adopting implementing measures for EU Directives and provides advice on policy issues in the securities field, so it fulfils both comity (the informal and voluntary recognition by courts of one jurisdiction of the laws and judicial decisions of another) and advisory functions.

== See also ==
- European Union
