= Alexandre Lamfalussy =

Central banker, economist

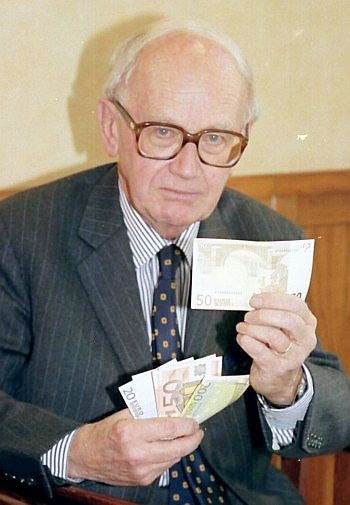
- Lamfalussy in 2003

President of the European Monetary Institute
- In office 12 January 1994 – 1 July 1997
- Preceded by: Position established
- Succeeded by: Wim Duisenberg

General Manager of the Bank for International Settlements
- In office 1 May 1985 – 31 December 1993
- President: Jean Godeaux; Wim Duisenberg; Bengt Dennis
- Preceded by: Gunther Schleiminger
- Succeeded by: Andrew Crockett

Personal details
- Born: Sándor Lámfalussy; 26 April 1929; Kapuvár, Hungary
- Died: 9 May 2015 (aged 86); Ottignies, Belgium
- Education: Catholic University of Leuven; Nuffield College, Oxford

Alexandre, Baron Lamfalussy (Hungarian: báró Lámfalussy Sándor; 26 April 1929 – 9 May 2015) was a Hungarian-born Belgian economist who served as President of the European Monetary Institute (EMI) from 1994 to 1997, which was the forerunner to the European Central Bank (ECB).

== Biography ==
Born in Kapuvár, Hungary, Lamfalussy's grandfather was born in Topolya, in present-day Slovakia. Lamfalussy left his native country in 1949. He studied at the Catholic University of Leuven and Nuffield College, Oxford, where he received his doctorate in economics. He later taught at the University of Louvain (UCLouvain) and Yale. From 1955 to 1975 he worked at the Banque de Bruxelles.

In 1963 he was among the founders of SUERF – an association originally set up as a group to promote financial research among academics, and served as the Association's first Honorary Treasurer. In honour of his contribution to European monetary and financial issues, he was made an honorary member of SUERF at the association's 40th anniversary meeting held at the Banque de France in Paris.

From 1976 he was an economic adviser to the Bank for International Settlements in Basel and held the post of assistant general manager from 1981 to 1985. He was then general manager of the bank, where he remained until 1993.

From 1994 to 1997 he was founding president of the European Monetary Institute in Frankfurt, forerunner to the European Central Bank.

From 2000 to 2001 he chaired the Committee of Wise Men on the Regulation of European Securities Markets, whose proposals were adopted by the Council of the European Union in March 2001. As chair of the committee, he oversaw the creation of the Lamfalussy process, an approach to the development of financial service industry regulation used most famously in MiFID - the Markets in Financial Instruments Directive. In 2013 he was decorated with Hungary's highest decoration, the Hungarian Order of Saint Stephen. He died on 9 May 2015 in Ottignies, Belgium.

== See also ==
- Delors Committee

Diplomatic posts
Preceded by Gunther Schleiminger	General Manager of the Bank for International Settlements; 1985–1994	Succeeded by Andrew Crockett
Government offices
New office	President of the European Monetary Institute; 1994–1997	Succeeded by Wim Duisenberg
