= Egmont Group of Financial Intelligence Units =

Network of financial intelligence units

- Formation: 1995; 31 years ago
- Founded at: Egmont Palace, Brussels, Belgium
- Headquarters: Ottawa, Ontario, Canada
- Members: See below
- Chair: Elżbieta Franków- Jaśkiewicz
- Website: egmontgroup.org

The Egmont Group of Financial Intelligence Units is an international organization that facilitates cooperation and intelligence sharing between national financial intelligence units (FIUs) to investigate and prevent money laundering and terrorist financing. National FIUs collect information on suspicious or unusual financial activity and are responsible for processing and analyzing the information received. FIUs are normally not law enforcement agencies themselves, findings are shared with appropriate law enforcement or prosecution bodies if sufficient evidence of unlawful activity is found. The Egmont Group is headquartered in Ottawa, Ontario, Canada.

== History ==
The Egmont Group was formed in 1995 as an informal network of 24 national FIUs, taking its name from the Egmont Palace in Brussels where the group's founding meeting took place. The Egmont Group Secretariat established its permanent headquarters in Ottawa on 15 February 2008.

== Purpose ==
The goal of the Egmont Group is to provide a forum for FIUs around the world to improve cooperation in the fight against money laundering and financing of terrorism and to foster the implementation of domestic programs in this field. The Egmont Group provides support to member FIUs by:

- expanding and systematizing international cooperation in the reciprocal exchange of information
- increasing the effectiveness of FIUs by offering training and promoting personnel exchanges to improve the expertise and capabilities of personnel employed by FIUs
- fostering better and secure communication among FIUs through the application of technology, such as the Egmont Secure Web (ESW)
- fostering increased coordination and support among the operational divisions of member FIUs
- promoting the operational autonomy of FIUs
- promoting the establishment of FIUs in conjunction with jurisdictions with an AML/CFT program in place, or in areas with a program in the early stages of development

== Member FIUs ==
The US Treasury Department defines an FIU as "a central, national agency responsible for receiving (and, as permitted, requesting), analyzing and disseminating to the competent authorities, disclosures of financial information: concerning suspected proceeds of crime and potential financing of terrorism, or required by national legislation or regulation, in order to counter money laundering and terrorism financing."

The current member FIUs of the group are:

- Albania – General Directorate for the Prevention of Money Laundering (GDPML)
- Algeria – Financial Intelligence Processing Unit (CTRF)
- Andorra – Financial Intelligence Unit–Andorra (FIUAND)
- Angola – Unidade de Informação Financeira (UIF-Angola)
- Anguilla – Money Laundering Reporting Authority (MLRA)
- Antigua and Barbuda – Office of National Drug and Money Laundering Control Policy (ONDCP)
- Argentina – Financial Information Unit Argentina (UIF)
- Armenia – Financial Monitoring Center (FMC)
- Aruba – Financial Intelligence Unit Aruba (former Reporting Center for Unusual Transactions- MOT-Aruba) (FIU-Aruba)
- Australia – Australian Transaction Reports and Analysis Centre (AUSTRAC)
- Austria – Austrian Financial Intelligence Unit (A-FIU) (A-FIU)
- Azerbaijan – Financial Monitoring Service (MMX)
- (The Bahamas) Bahamas – Financial Intelligence Unit Bahamas (FIU-Bahamas)
- Bahrain – Financial Intelligence Directorate (FID)
- Bangladesh – Bangladesh Financial Intelligence Unit (BFIU)
- Barbados – Financial Intelligence Unit (FIU-Barbados)
- Belarus – Department of Financial Monitoring of the State Control Committee of the Republic of Belarus (DFM)
- Belgium – Belgian Financial Intelligence Processing Unit (CTIF-CFI)
- Belize – Financial Intelligence Unit Belize (FIU-Belize)
- Benin – Cellule Nationale de Traitement des Informations Financières du Bénin (CENTIF)
- Bermuda – Financial Intelligence Agency – Bermuda (FIA)
- Bolivia – Unidad de Investigaciones Financieras (UIF)
- (Bosnia and Herzegovina) Bosnia & Herzegovina – Financial Intelligence Department (FID)
- Brazil – Council for Financial Activities Control (COAF )
- British Virgin Islands – Financial Investigation Agency British Virgin Islands (FIA)
- Brunei – Financial Intelligence Unit Brunei Darussalam (FIE, AMBD)
- Bulgaria – Financial Intelligence Directorate – State Agency for National Security (FID-SANS)
- Burkina Faso – National Financial Information Processing Unit (CENTIF-BF)
- Cambodia – Cambodia Financial Intelligence Unit (CAFIU)
- Cameroon – National Agency for Financial Investigation (NAFI)
- Canada – Financial Transactions and Reports Analysis Centre of Canada (FINTRAC-CANAFE)
- Cape Verde – Cape Verde UIF (UIF)
- Cayman Islands – Financial Reporting Authority (FRA)
- Chad – Agence Nationale d Investigation Financière du Tchad (ANIF)
- Chile – Unidad de Análisis Financiero (UAF)
- Colombia – Unidad de Informacion y Analisis Financiero (UIAF)
- (Republic of the Congo) Congo, Republic of – Agence Nationale D'Investigation Financiere (ANIF)
- Cook Islands - Cook Islands Financial Intelligence Unit (CIFIU)
- Costa Rica – Unidad de Análisis Financiero (UAF) Instituto Costarricense sobre Drogas (ICD)
- Croatia – Anti-Money Laundering Office (AMLO)
- Curaçao – FIU Curaçao – Meldpunt Ongebruikelijke Transacties (MOT)/Unusual Transactions Reporting Centre
- Cyprus – Unit for Combating Money Laundering (MOKAS)
- Czech Republic – Financní analytický útvar (FAU – CR)Financial Analytical Unit
- Denmark – Hvidvasksekretariatet Stadsadvokaten for Særlig Økonomisk Kriminalitet / Hvidvasksekretariatet (HVIDVASK) State Prosecutor for Serious Economic Crime / Money Laundering Secretariat
- Dominica – Financial Intelligence Unit
- Egypt – Egyptian Money Laundering Combating Unit (EMLCU)
- El Salvador – Unidad de Investigacion Financiera
- Estonia – Estonian Financial Intelligence Unit
- Fiji – Financial Intelligence Unit, Reserve Bank of Fiji
- Finland – RAP Keskusrikospoliisi / Rahanpesun selvittelykeskus National Bureau of Investigation / Financial Intelligence Unit
- France – Traitement du renseignement et action contre les circuits financiers clandestins (TRACFIN)
- (Georgia (country)) Georgia – Financial Monitoring Service of Georgia (FMS)
- Germany – Financial Intelligence Unit (FIU) at the Central Customs Authority – Zentralstelle für Finanztransaktionsuntersuchungen bei der Direktion VIII (Zollkriminalamt) der Generalzolldirektion
- Gibraltar – Gibraltar Co-ordinating Centre for Criminal Intelligence and Drugs – Gibraltar Financial Intelligence Unit (GCID GFIU)
- Greece – Hellenic Anti-Money Laundering and Anti-Terrorism Financing Commission (HAMLC)
- Grenada – Financial Intelligence Unit (FIU)
- Guatemala – Intendencia de Verificación Especial (IVE) Special Verification Intendency
- Guernsey – Financial Intelligence Service (FIS)
- Honduras – Unidad de Informacion Financiera (UIF)
- Hong Kong – Joint Financial Intelligence Unit (JFIU)
- Hungary – Central Criminal Investigations Bureau of the Hungarian Customs & Finance Guard Hungarian Financial Intelligence Unit
- Iceland – Ríkislögreglustjórinn (RLS) Unit of Investigation and Prosecution of Economic and Environmental Crime
- India – Financial Intelligence Unit (FIU-IND)
- Indonesia – Pusat Pelaporan dan Analisis Transaksi Keuangan (PPATK) / Indonesian Financial Transaction Reports and Analysis Center (INTRAC)
- (Republic of Ireland) Ireland – FIU-Ireland / National Economic Crime Bureau (FIU-Ireland)
- Isle of Man – Financial Intelligence Unit (FIU–IOM)
- Israel – Israel Money Laundering Prohibition Authority (IMPA)
- Italy – Banca d’Italia — Unità di Informazione Finanziaria (UIF)
- Japan – Japan Financial Intelligence Center (JAFIC)
- Jersey – Jersey States of Jersey Police – Joint Financial Crimes Unit
- Kyrgyzstan – Financial Intelligence Service of the Kyrgyz Republic (FIS)
- Latvia - Financial Intelligence Unit of Latvia (FIU Latvia)
- Lebanon – Special Investigation Commission (SIC) Fighting Money Laundering
- Liechtenstein – Einheit für Finanzinformationen (EFFI)
- Lithuania – Financial Crime Investigation Service (FCIS)
- Luxembourg – Cellule de Renseignement Financier (FIU-LUX)
- Macau – Gabinete de Informação Financeira (GIF) Financial Intelligence Office
- Malawi – Financial Intelligence Unit (FIU-Malawi)
- Malaysia – Unit Perisikan Kewangan, Bank Negara Malaysia (UPWBNM)
- Malta – Financial Intelligence Analysis Unit (FIAU)
- Marshall Islands – Domestic Financial Intelligence Unit (DFIU)
- Mauritius - Financial Intelligence Unit (FIU)
- Mexico – Unidad de Inteligencia Financiera (UIF)
- Moldova – Office for Prevention and Combating of Money Laundering (SPCSB)
- Monaco – Service for Information and Monitoring of Financial Networks (SICFIN)
- Mongolia – Financial Information Unit of Mongolia (FIU-Mongolia)
- Montenegro – Administration for the Prevention of Money Laundering
- Netherlands – Financial Intelligence Unit – Nederland (FIU-Netherlands)
- New Zealand – New Zealand Police Financial Intelligence Unit
- Nigeria – Nigerian Financial Intelligence Unit (NFIU)
- Niue – Niue Financial Intelligence Unit
- North Macedonia – Ministerstvo za Finansii-Direkcija za Sprecuvanje na Perenje Pari/Money Laundering Prevention Directorate (MLPD)
- Norway – ØKOKRIM / EFE – Enheten for finansiell etteretning The National Authority for Investigation and Prosecution of Economic and Environmental Crime – The Money Laundering Unit
- Pakistan – Financial Monitoring Unit
- Paraguay – Unidad de Análisis Financiero (UAF-SEPRELAD)
- Peru – Unidad de Inteligencia Financiera del Peru (UIF)
- Philippines – Anti-Money Laundering Council (AMLC)
- Poland – Generalny Inspektor Informacji Finansowej (GIIF) General Inspector of Financial Information
- Portugal – Unidade de Informação Financeira (UIF)
- Qatar – Qatar Financial Information Unit (QFIU)
- South Korea – Korea Financial Intelligence Unit
- Serbia – Administration for the Preventing of Money Laundering
- Panama – Unidad de Analisis Financiero (UAF)
- Romania – National Office for the Prevention and Control of Money Laundering
- Russia – Federal Service for Financial Monitoring
- San Marino – Agenzia di Informazione Finanziaria (AIF) Financial Intelligence Agency (FIA)
- Saudi Arabia – Saudi Arabia Financial Investigation Unit (SAFIU)
- Senegal – Cellule Nationale de Traitement des Informations Financières National Financial Intelligence Processing Unit (CENTIF)
- Seychelles – Seychelles Financial Intelligence Unit
- Singapore – Suspicious Transaction Reporting Office (STRO)
- Slovakia – Spravodajská jednotka finacnej polície Úradu boja proti organizovanej kriminalite (SJFP UBPOK) Financial Intelligence Unit of the Bureau of Organised Crime
- Slovenia – Urad RS za Preprecevanje Pranja Denarja Ministrstvo za Finance/Office for Money Laundering Prevention (OMLP)
- South Africa – Financial Intelligence Centre (FIC)
- Spain – Servicio Ejecutivo de la Comisión de Prevención de Blanqueo de Capitales e Infracciones Monetarias (SEPBLAC)
- Sri Lanka – Financial Intelligence Unit
- Saint Kitts and Nevis – Financial Intelligence Unit
- Saint Lucia – Financial Intelligence Agency
- Saint Vincent and the Grenadines – Financial Intelligence Unit
- Sweden – Finanspolisen Rikskriminalpolisen (FIPO) National Criminal Intelligence Service, Financial Unit (NFIS)
- Switzerland – Meldestelle für Geldwäscherei, Bureau de communication en matière de blanchiment d'argent, Ufficio di comunicazione in materia di riciclaggio di denaro Money Laundering Reporting Office (MROS)
- Syria – Combating Money Laundering and Terrorism Financing Commission (CMLC)
- Taiwan – Money Laundering Prevention Center
- Thailand – Anti-Money Laundering Office (AMLO)
- Togo – Togo Financial Intelligence Unit
- Trinidad and Tobago – Trinidad and Tobago Financial Intelligence Unit
- Turkey – Mali Suçlari Arastirma Kurulu (MASAK) Financial Crimes Investigation Board
- Turks and Caicos Islands – Royal Turks and Caicos Islands Police Force Financial Crime Unit
- Ukraine – State Committee for Financial Monitoring
- United Arab Emirates – United Arab Emirates Financial Intelligence Unit
- United Kingdom – National Crime Agency (NCA)
- United States – Financial Crimes Enforcement Network (FinCEN)
- Vanuatu – Financial Intelligence Unit (FIU)
- Vatican City – Autorità di Informazione Finanziaria (AIF)
- Venezuela – Unidad Nacional de Inteligencia Financiera (UNIF)

== Notable non-member observers ==
The Egmont Groups admits governmental or intergovernmental organizations as non-member observers whose roles relate to preventing money-laundering and/or the financing of terrorism. Several notable organizations are observers, including:

- Common Market for Eastern and Southern Africa
- Cooperation Council for the Arab States of the Gulf
- European Commission
- Europol
- International Monetary Fund
- Organization for Security and Co-operation in Europe
- United Nations Office on Drugs and Crime
- World Bank
- World Customs Organization
