= Anti-Money Laundering Authority =

EU agency in Frankfurt

Agency overview
- Formed: 26 June 2024
- Type: Decentralized agency
- Jurisdiction: European Union
- Headquarters: Frankfurt, Germany
- Agency executives: Bruna Szego, Chair; Nicolas Vasse, Executive Director
- Key document: Regulation (EU) 2024/1620
- Website: www.amla.europa.eu

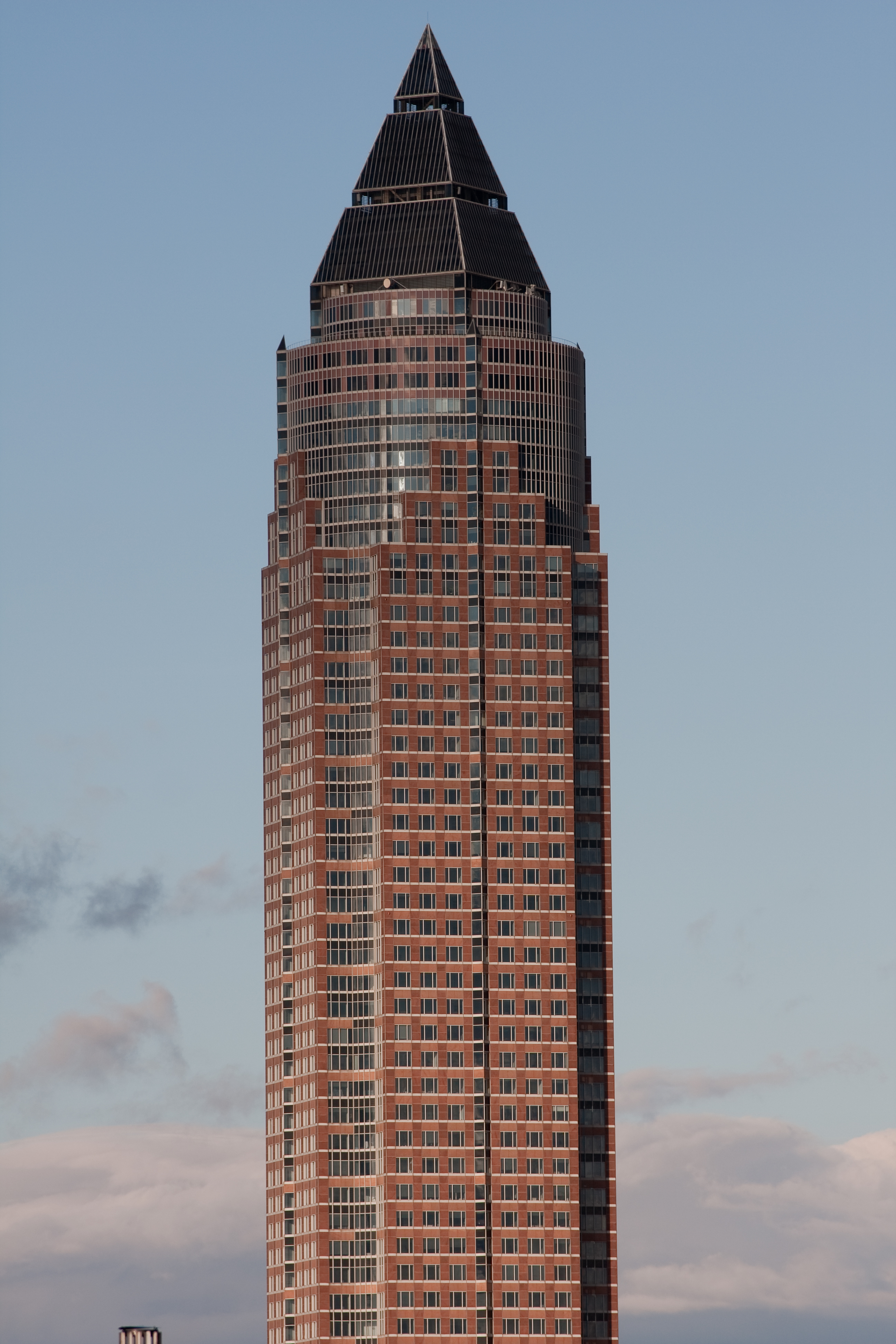
Messeturm in Frankfurt, seat of AMLA since 2025

The Anti-Money Laundering Authority (AMLA), formally known as the Authority for Anti-Money Laundering and Countering the Financing of Terrorism, is an agency of the European Union, established in 2024 in Frankfurt.

AMLA's establishment has been characterized as "much-needed" by major EU political forces, and it has been described as transformational by a wide range of observers. It is expected to strengthen the policy framework to ensure the integrity of the EU financial system, as the central component of the EU's anti–money laundering efforts.

== History ==
In February 2018, the demise of ABLV Bank in Latvia triggered a debate on the structure of Anti-Money Laundering (AML) supervision in the European Union. A few weeks later, ECB Supervisory Board chair Danièle Nouy declared that it is "very embarrassing to depend on the United States to do the [AML] job. This has to change [...] We need a European institution that is implementing in a thorough, deep, consistent fashion this [AML] legislation in the euro area". In October 2018, the think-tank Bruegel published a study recommending the creation of a European AML Authority and providing a blueprint for its key features.

The European Commission first proposed AMLA in July 2021 after a series of financial scandals further exposed significant flaws in AML supervision. Described as a "game-changer in cracking down on dirty money in the EU," AMLA is intended to curb illicit financial flows while improving coordination between governmental intelligence authorities within the EU.

The selection AMLA's host city followed a new procedure after a European Court of Justice ruling in 2022 in relation to establishment of the European Labour Authority and relocation of the European Medicines Agency. The court had ruled that under the EU treaties it is a joint competence of the European Parliament and the Council of the European Union to designate the seats of EU agencies, while the previous practice had been that such decisions were taken by representatives of member state governments alone.

Member states submitted nine application for the seat of AMLA – Brussels, Frankfurt, Dublin, Madrid, Paris, Rome, Riga, Vilnius and Vienna – that were presented in a public hearing at the Parliament and assessed by the Commission. On 22 February 2024, MEPs and member state representatives held an informal meeting to decide on AMLA's seat by a vote where the Parliament and the Council each had 27 votes. Frankfurt received a majority of votes cast on the first round of voting and was thus selected to host AMLA.

The EU regulation establishing AMLA entered into force on 26 June 2024. That same day, the newly established agency advertised an open position for its chair. AMLA announced in January 2025 that it would have its offices in Frankfurt's Messeturm building, and formally started operations on 1 July 2025.

AMLA was expected to have a headcount of around 80 at the end of 2025, and is expected to start direct supervision of relevant entities in 2028. On 1 January 2026, the European Banking Authority (EBA) completed the transfer to AMLA of all its mandates related to anti-money laundering and countering the financing of terrorism. In February 2026, AMLA issued a statement confirming that it would be fully operational by 2028. The agency intends to finalise its methodology for its risk assessment in 2026 and start the selection process in 2027.

== General Board membership ==
AMLA's General Board meets in two different so-called compositions: "supervisory composition" for AML supervision matters, and "FIU composition" for Financial Intelligence Unit matters.

=== Supervisory composition ===
As of 13 November 2025, 127 national authorities from 27 countries were members of the General Board's supervisory composition. Two countries, Germany and the Netherlands, were represented each by a single authority, whereas Portugal had as many as ten different authorities represented. By that date, 23 of the 27 countries (all but Denmark, Poland, Portugal, and Slovenia) had nominated a permanent single common representative, from the following authorities:

- Austria: Financial Market Authority (FMA)
- Belgium: National Bank of Belgium (NBB)
- Bulgaria: Bulgarian National Bank (BNB)
- Croatia: Croatian National Bank (HNB)
- Cyprus: Central Bank of Cyprus (CBC)
- Czech Republic: Czech National Bank (CNB)
- Estonia: Finantsinspektsioon
- Finland: Finnish Financial Supervisory Authority (FIN-FSA)
- France: Prudential Supervision and Resolution Authority (ACPR)
- Germany: Bundesanstalt für Finanzdienstleistungsaufsicht (BaFin)
- Greece: Bank of Greece
- Hungary: Hungarian National Bank (MNB)
- Ireland: Central Bank of Ireland (CBI)
- Italy: Bank of Italy
- Latvia: Bank of Latvia
- Lithuania: Bank of Lithuania (LB)
- Luxembourg: Commission de Surveillance du Secteur Financier (CSSF)
- Malta: Financial Intelligence Analysis Unit (FIAU)
- Netherlands: De Nederlandsche Bank (DNB)
- Romania: National Bank of Romania (BNR)
- Slovakia: National Bank of Slovakia (NBS)
- Spain: SEPBLAC
- Sweden: Finansinspektionen

=== FIU composition ===
By contrast to the supervisory composition, the FIU composition of the AMLA General Board includes only one member per country, namely the national Financial Intelligence Unit. As of November 2025, the FIUs of 7 of the 27 EU member states (Czechia, Estonia, Lithuania, Malta, Poland, Romania, and Spain) were also represented in the AMLA General Board's supervisory composition.

== Leadership ==
Bruna Szego, formerly an official at the Bank of Italy, has been chair of AMLA since January 2025. Simonas Krėpšta (previously at the Bank of Lithuania), Rikke-Louise Ørum-Peterson (previously at the Danish Financial Supervisory Authority), Derville Rowland (formerly at the Central Bank of Ireland), and Manuel Vega Serrano (formerly at the Spanish Ministry of the Economy) took up their role as Executive Board members in early June 2025. In July 2025, Nicolas Vasse was appointed as the first executive director of AMLA.

== See also ==
- European Anti-Fraud Office
- Agencies of the European Union
