= Italy's Financial Intelligence Unit =

Government agency of Italy

Italy's Financial Intelligence Unit (FIU; Italian - Unità di Informazione Finanziaria per l'Italia) is the national authority responsible for combating money laundering and terrorist financing. It was established on January 1, 2008, under Legislative Decree No. 231/2007. It independently operates within the Bank of Italy, succeeding the former Italian Foreign Exchange Office.

The FIU collects and analyzes data on financial transactions. It primarily receives suspicious transaction reports (STRs) from financial institutions, professionals, and other obligated parties.These reports serve as a crucial tool for identifying suspicious or illicit financial activities.

The Unit works closely with national supervisory authorities and law enforcement agencies. It is also a member of the Egmont Group, an international network that supports cooperation among financial intelligence units worldwide.
