= Financial Reporting Center =

Administrative agency in Somalia

Financial Reporting Center (Somalia)
- Financial intelligence Unite (FIU)

Agency overview
- Formed: May 18, 2016; 10 years ago
- Type: Independent
- Jurisdiction: Federal government of Somalia
- Headquarters: Mogadishu, Somalia
- Motto: "No Money for Terror"
- Agency executive: Amina Mohamed Ali, Director
- Website: www.frc.gov.so

The Financial Reporting Center (FRC) in Somalia was established by the Anti-Money Laundering and Countering the Financing of Terrorism Act, 2016 to operate as a National Central Agency that is responsible for the receipt, analysis and appropriate dissemination of all information relating to money-laundering and terrorism financing.
The FRC serves as Somalia's Financial Intelligence Unit (FIU), an independent center of expertise in the analysis of suspicious financial activity and the investigation of financial crimes.

== Purpose ==
When the FRC was established, its purpose was to serves as a national center for the receipt and analysis of (a) suspicious transaction reports, and (b) other information relevant to money laundering, associated predicate offences and financing of terrorism, and for the dissemination of the results of that analysis.

== Organizational structure ==
The National Anti-Money Laundering and Countering the Financing of Terrorism Committee NAMLC is responsible for appointing the Director of the FRC, setting strategic priorities for the FRC, articulating a national anti-money laundering and countering the financing of terrorism (AML/CFT) strategy,.s.

The FRC has five major divisions:

- Analysis & Enforcement Division
- Supervisory Review Division
- Regulatory Policy Division
- Data Security Division
- Administration Division
