= Ahmad bin Eid al-Thani =

Qatari government official

Ahmad bin Eid al-Thani (عيد آل ثاني) is a cabinet-level Qatari government official. He serves as the head of Qatar’s Financial Information Unit (QFIU), a national body established under the “Law No.(4) of Year 2010 on Combating Money Laundering and Terrorism Financing” which is responsible for monitoring and analysis of suspected money laundering and potential terrorist financing operations in the country.

Al-Thani has spoken out in clear opposition to money laundering and terror financing. At the Ahmed Bin Muhammed Military College in Doha, Qatar, in 2009, he said:

"The money laundering and financing terrorism is one of the most dangerous financial crimes which have negative impacts on the society as it can dominate on most of the financial crimes and illegal activities. For this reason, the State of Qatar drafted many rules and legislations to fight this crime to keep all institutions of the country far from this evil."

He is the son of Sheikh Eid bin Mohammed bin Thani. He is one of the four founding members and Vice President of the Qatar National Company for Medical Projects.
