= Claudia Maria Buch =

German economist

Claudia Buch

Chair of the ECB Supervisory Board
- Designate
- Assuming office 1 January 2024
- Succeeding: Andrea Enria

Personal details
- Born: March 1966 (age 60) Paderborn, West Germany (now Germany)
- Education: University of Bonn (BA, MA); University of Wisconsin, Eau Claire (MBA); University of Kiel (PhD, Dr. habil.)

Academic background
- Doctoral advisor: Horst Siebert

Academic work
- Discipline: Political economics
- Institutions: Otto-von-Guericke University Magdeburg; Halle Institute for Economic Research
- Website: Information at IDEAS / RePEc

Claudia Maria Buch (also Claudia-Maria Buch; born March 1966) is a German economist who serves as Chair of the ECB Supervisory Board since 2024. She was a Vice President of the Bundesbank from 2014 to 2023.

Earlier in her career, Buch worked as professor at the University of Tübingen and was a member of the German Council of Economic Experts.

She worked as scientific director at the Institut für Angewandte Wirtschaftsforschung (Institute of Applied Economic Studies) in Tübingen and as chairperson of the economic council at the Federal Ministry of Economics and Technology. She still teaches at the Otto-von-Guericke-Universität Magdeburg. Her research focuses on regulation and supervision of banking.

== Early life and education ==
Buch was born in March 1966 in Paderborn. She attended the Gymnasium Theodorianum in Paderborn and subsequently studied economics at the University of Bonn from 1985 to 1991, graduating with a degree as Diplom-Volkswirtin. She was also granted a Master of Business Administration at the University of Wisconsin–Eau Claire after studying there between 1988 and 1989. During 1991 and 1992 she passed the Advanced Studies-Program in International Economic Policy Research at the Kiel Institute for the World Economy (IfW).

== Career ==
From 1992, Buch worked at IfW Kiel as a scientific assistant in the research group "Central and Eastern Europe". Since 1996 she has worked in the research group "Financial Markets". In 1996 she received a doctoral degree from the University of Kiel and was promoted to professor in 2002. For the IfW she was in charge of the research field "Financial Markets" between 2001 and 2003. She was a visiting scholar at the Salomon Center for the Study of Financial Institutions (New York University), at the University of Michigan (Ann Arbor), at the National Bureau of Economic Research (Cambridge MA), and at the Research Center of the Deutsche Bundesbank (Frankfurt).

In 2004 Buch was appointed professor at the University of Tübingen, holding the chair for International Macroeconomics and Finance with a focus on money and currency. She became director of the Institute of Applied Economic Research in 2005. She does research on regulation and supervision of banking. Since 2004, she has been a member of the economic council of the German Federal Ministry of Economics and Technology, since 2008 as its chair. From 2007 on Buch worked as research professor in the Centre for European Economic Research in Mannheim. In 2011 she was appointed to the scientific council of the European Systemic Risk Board.

Between July and December 2010, Buch served as member of the Expert Council for Exit Strategies in the Financial Sector at the German Federal Ministry of Finance.

=== German Council of Economic Experts, 2012–2014 ===
In February 2012, at the suggestion of the Federal Minister of Economics and Technology Philipp Rösler, the German government decided to make Buch a member of the German Council of Economic Experts (Sachverständigenrat zur Begutachtung der gesamtwirtschaftlichen Entwicklung) from 1 March 2012. She succeeded Beatrice Weder di Mauro and is the second female member of the council since its foundation in 1963.

In a 2012 interview with Frankfurter Allgemeine Zeitung, Buch held that “Eurobonds in the framework of a political union, with joint control and a surrendering of fiscal powers, would be theoretically an alternative in the long term.” While calling such as solution “politically unrealistic,” she promoted the debt-redemption fund as an alternative to European Central Bank monetization of sovereign debt. The fund, which would mutualize euro-area debt exceeding 60 percent of member states’ economic output in return for strict conditions, would offer a temporary solution until the bloc stabilize its finances, Buch told the newspaper.

Later that year, Buch warned: "If the ECB were to buy even more government bonds, it would assume a redistribution function. The ECB lacks both the mandate and the democratic authority to do so."

In 2013, Buch and Elke König, who headed the Federal Financial Supervisory Authority (BaFin) at the time, were cited by German media as contenders for a post on the Executive Board of the European Central Bank that eventually went to Sabine Lautenschläger.

Between July 2013 and March 2014, Buch served as member of the European Commission’s expert group on debt redemption fund and eurobills, led by Gertrude Tumpel-Gugerell. The expert group was set up with a mandate to deepen the analysis on the possible merits, risks, requirements and obstacles of partial substitution of national issuance of debt through joint issuance in the form of a redemption fund and eurobills.

=== Vice President of Bundesbank, 2014–2023 ===
In February 2014, the German government nominated Claudia Buch as vice president of the Bundesbank, succeeding Sabine Lautenschläger as the only woman on the central bank's board; Isabel Schnabel was named Buch's successor on the Council of Economic Experts shortly after. In her capacity as vice president, Bucher oversaw the bank's activities on Financial Stability, Internal Audit and Statistics. She also accompanied President Jens Weidmann to the sessions of the Governing Council of the European Central Bank.

At the time, German news media like Der Spiegel considered Buch's nomination a victory for Finance Minister Wolfgang Schäuble and Chancellor Angela Merkel’s Christian Democratic-led bloc in a power struggle with their Social Democratic coalition partners; Vice Chancellor Sigmar Gabriel, led the SPD at the time, reportedly wanted to give the job to Bundesbank board member Joachim Nagel.

From May 2014, Buch was a member of the Financial Stability Commission at the Federal Ministry of Finance, representing the Bundesbank.

=== Chair of the European Central Bank Supervisory Board, 2024–present ===
In March 2023, Buch was appointed to the ECB Supervisory Board, as the Bundesbank's representative. In July 2023, the ECB shortlisted Buch and Margarita Delgado as candidates to succeed Andrea Enria as the board's chair. In September, the ECB finally chose to appoint Buch as SSM chair, the European Parliament approved this nomination on 3 October and on October 19, the European Council appointed Claudia Buch as chair of the SSM, with her five-years term starting from 1 January 2024.

== Other activities ==
=== Regulatory agencies ===
- Bank for International Settlements (BIS), Ex-Officio Chairwoman of the Irving Fisher Committee on Central Bank Statistics (since 2016), Ex-Officio Member of the Committee on the Global Financial System (since 2014)
- Financial Stability Board (FSB), Ex-Officio Member of the Standing Committee on Assessment of Vulnerabilities (since 2014)
- Economic and Financial Committee, Ex-Officio Member (since 2014)
- Federal Financial Supervisory Authority (BaFin), Ex-Officio Member of the Financial Stability Commission (since 2014)

=== Scientific institutions ===
- Center for Economic and Policy Research (CEPR), Distinguished Fellow (since 2019)
- Goethe University Frankfurt, Member of the University Council (since 2015)
- Halle Institute for Economic Research (IWH), Member of the Scientific Advisory Board (since 2015)
- Rheinisch-Westfälisches Institut für Wirtschaftsforschung (RWI), Member of the Scientific Advisory Board (2011–2013), Member of the supervisory board (since 2015)
- International Banking Research Network (IBRN), co-director (since 2012)
- Verein für Socialpolitik, Member of the executive board (since 2011)
- Max Planck Institute for Tax Law and Public Finance, Member of the Board of Trustees (2014–2016)
- Association of German Economic Research Institutes (ARGE), deputy chair of the Board (2013–2014)
- European Systemic Risk Board (ESRB), Member of the Advisory Scientific Committee (2011–2014)
- German Research Foundation (DFG), Member of the Senate (2008–2014)
- Kiel Institute for the World Economy (IfW), Member of the Scientific Advisory Board (2008–2013)
- German National Library of Economics (ZBW), Member of the Scientific Advisory Board (2004–2007)

=== Editorial boards ===
- German Economic Review, Member of the editorial board (since 2012)
- Comparative Economic Studies, Member of the editorial board (2013–2014)
- Applied Economics Quarterly, Member of the Editorial Board
- Empirica, Member of the Editorial Board

== Selected publications ==
- ———; Eickmeier, Sandra; Prieto, Esteban (2014). "Macroeconomic Factors and Microlevel Bank Behavior". Journal of Money, Credit and Banking. 46 (4): 715–751. doi:10.1111/jmcb.12123.
- Blank, Sven; ———; Neugebauer, Katja (2009). "Shocks at large banks and banking sector distress: The Banking Granular Residual". Journal of Financial Stability. 5 (4): 353–373. doi:10.1016/j.jfs.2008.12.002. hdl:10419/27687. S2CID 15967645.
- ———; Toubal, Farid (2009). "Openness and Growth: The Long Shadow of the Berlin Wall" (PDF). Journal of Macroeconomics. 31 (3): 409–422. doi:10.1016/j.jmacro.2008.07.004.
- ——— (2005). "Distance and International Banking". Review of International Economics. 13 (4): 787–804. doi:10.1111/j.1467-9396.2005.00537.x. hdl:10419/17726.
- ———; Doepke, Joerg; Pierdzioch, Christian (2004). "Business Cycle Volatility in Germany". German Economic Review. 5 (4): 451–479. doi:10.1111/j.1465-6485.2004.00117.x. hdl:10419/17797. S2CID 53453008.
