= Sabine Lautenschläger =

German jurist

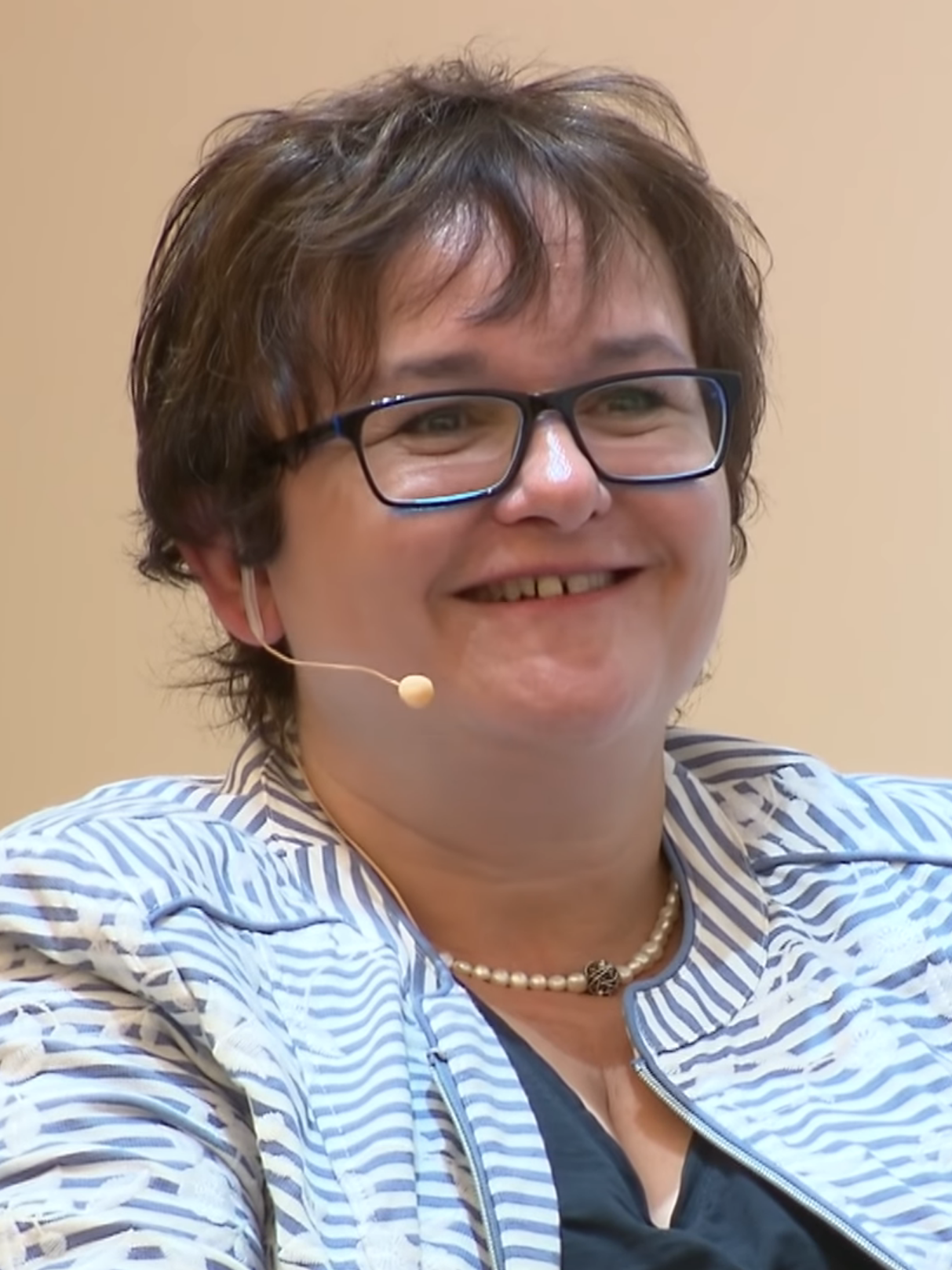
- Lautenschläger in 2018

Member of the Executive Board of the European Central Bank
- In office 27 January 2014 – 31 October 2019
- Preceded by: Jörg Asmussen
- Succeeded by: Isabel Schnabel

Personal details
- Born: 3 June 1964 (age 61) Stuttgart, West Germany (now Germany)
- Education: University of Bonn

Sabine Lautenschläger (born 3 June 1964) is a German jurist who served as a member of the Executive Board of the European Central Bank from 2014 to 2019. She previously served as vice-president of the Deutsche Bundesbank from 2011 to 2013.

In 2022, Lautenschläger joined law firm Covington’s Frankfurt office as Senior Advisor.

== Education and early career ==
Lautenschläger graduated with a Staatsexamen from the University of Bonn in 1990. She began her career on banking supervision in 1995 at the Federal Banking Supervisory Office, the predecessor to today's Federal Financial Supervisory Authority (BaFin). She served there as a member of the Basel Committee on Banking Supervision between 2008 and early 2014.

=== Vice President of Bundesbank, 2011–2013 ===
Lautenschläger was appointed as vice president of the Bundesbank in 2011, the first woman to hold that position. In that capacity, she was in charge of banking and financial supervision. She also served as member of the Financial Stability Committee of the European System of Central Banks between 2012 and early 2014.

During her time at Bundesbank, Lautenschläger pushed for the ECB's stress tests on bank assets to be tough and credible, while calling for the euro region's prospective bank resolution mechanism to have a strong legal basis. She has been among those who have warned about potential conflicts of interest when the ECB has responsibility for both monetary policy and banking supervision. She has argued against treating government bonds as risk-free assets on banks' books. She was also known for her warnings on the risks of keeping interest rates too low for too long.

In line with the Bundesbank board, Lautenschläger consistently opposed the ECB's bond-buying plan, known as Outright Monetary Transactions (OMT).

=== Member of the Executive Board of the ECB, 2014–2019 ===
Lautenschläger was nominated by the German government as a member of the Executive Board of the European Central Bank in December 2013, succeeding Jörg Asmussen. At the time, Claudia Maria Buch and Elke König were cited by German media as contenders for the post. The eurozone governments were under pressure from MEPs to appoint a woman to the board, which had been all-male after Austria's Gertrude Tumpel-Gugerell left midway through 2011.

Unlike her predecessor, Jörg Asmussen, she has no formal party affiliation. Lautenschläger's nomination was welcomed by policymakers across the political spectrum. Her candidacy was endorsed by the European Parliament Committee on Economic and Monetary Affairs on 13 January and by the full assembly three days later, on 16 January. Early on, commentators noted that Lautenschläger's regulatory experience could also make her an option for the deputy chair of the ECB's Supervisory Board, which must be filled by an executive board member.

Since her appointment as Vice-Chair of the ECB Supervisory Board in February 2014, Lautenschläger has – alongside Chair Danièle Nouy – also been responsible for European Banking Supervision. She represented the ECB in that capacity in the Basel Committee on Banking Supervision.

In early September 2014, Danièle Nouy and Lautenschläger were mentioned in media ahead of the results of sweeping stress tests that probed the balance sheets of the eurozone's largest lenders.

By November 2014, Lautenschläger signaled she would oppose having the ECB purchase government bonds of eurozone countries unless there was a clear threat of persistent consumer price declines. This is a contradiction to an earlier message conveyed by ECB President Mario Draghi and his top deputy Vítor Constâncio to bring inflation higher. Alongside Bundesbank president Jens Weidmann, she later led the opposition in the Governing Council against the decision on 22 January 2015 to start large-scale bond-buying, amid concerns that it removes pressure from euro-area countries to reform their economies and boost competitiveness. By April 2015, she publicly called into question the effectiveness of the bond-buying program and also warned that low interest rates could lead to asset price bubbles.

In November 2015, Lautenschläger again broke the normal etiquette by her public criticism of the bank's scheme of quantitative easing. She said that a more loose monetary policy had its limits and that money printing had yet to stabilize sinking price inflation, its formal goal.

In September 2019, Lautenschläger quit the Executive Board of the ECB. The ECB did not say why Lautenschläger had quit, though speculation includes her opposition to loose monetary policy, the ending of her role on the Supervisory Board and the impending changes at the top the ECB. She became the third consecutive German board member to resign before the end of their full term.

== Other activities ==
- Commerzbank, Member of the Supervisory Board (since 2025)
- Alfried Krupp von Bohlen und Halbach Foundation, Member of the Board of Trustees
- Financial Stability Board (FSB), Ex-Officio Member of the Standing Committee on Supervisory and Regulatory Cooperation (2015-2019)

Government offices
Preceded by Jörg Asmussen	Member of the Executive Board of the European Central Bank; 2014–2019	Succeeded by Isabel Schnabel
