= COAF =

COAF may refer to:

- Children of Armenia Fund, a non-profit, non-governmental organization with headquarters in Armenia and the United States, focused on child-centered development of rural Armenia
- Council for Financial Activities Control, Brazil's national financial intelligence unit, responsible for analyzing information on financial transactions linked to money laundering
- Capital One Auto Finance, former name of a bank company

== See also ==
- Coif
- Coff
