= French Prudential Supervision and Resolution Authority =

Banking and insurance regulatory agency

ACPR logo

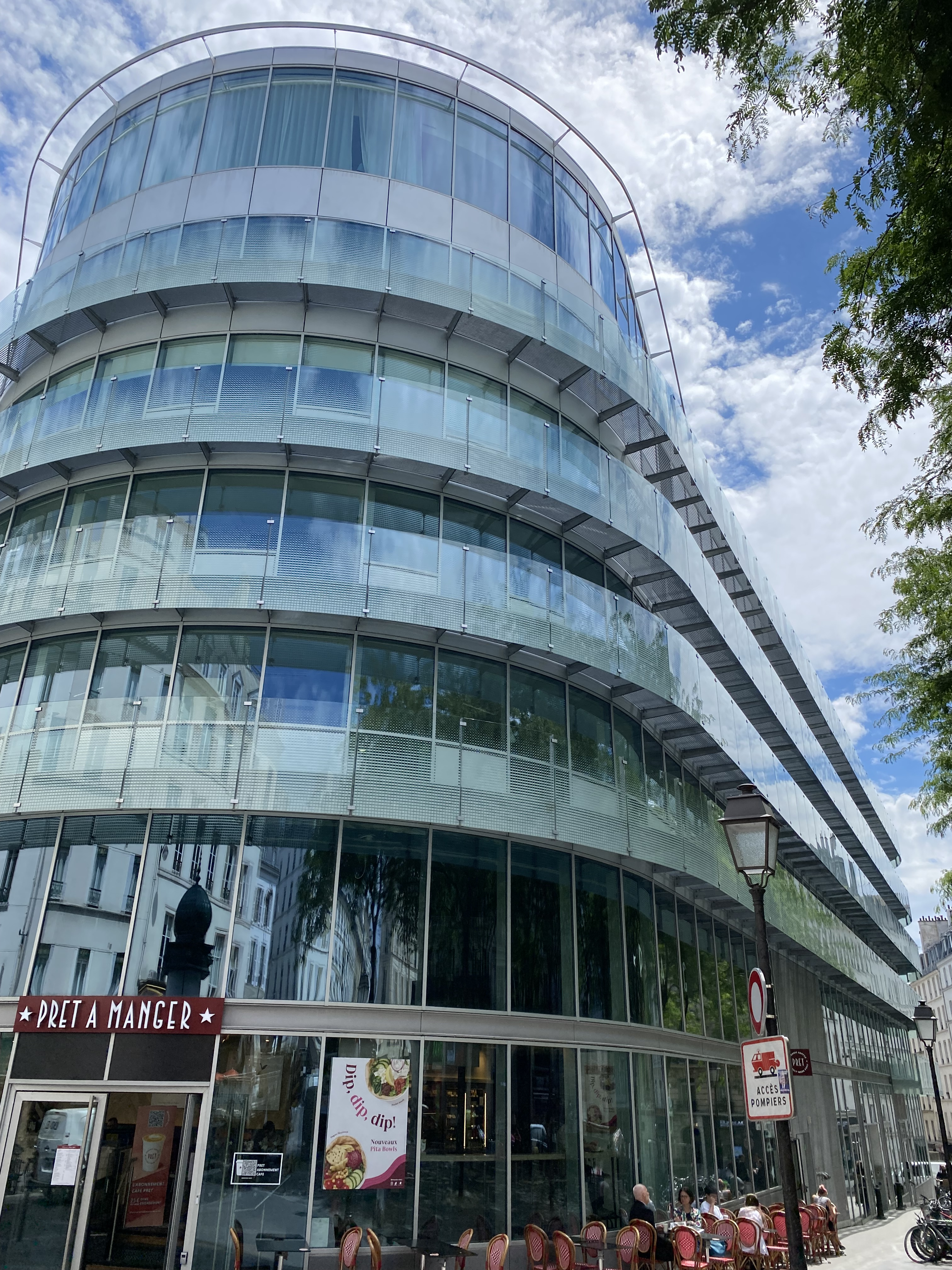
The ACPR head office has been located since 2018 at 4, place de Budapest in Paris

The French Prudential Supervision and Resolution Authority (French: Autorité de contrôle prudentiel et de résolution, ACPR), formerly known as Prudential Supervision Authority (French: Autorité de contrôle prudentiel, ACP), is a financial supervisory authority within the Bank of France, which exercises prudential supervision of regulated French financial firms such as banks and insurance companies.

Under European Union policy frameworks, the ACPR is the national competent authority for France within European Banking Supervision. It is a voting member of the respective Boards of Supervisors of the European Banking Authority (EBA) and European Insurance and Occupational Pensions Authority (EIOPA), It is France's designated National Resolution Authority and plenary session member of the Single Resolution Board (SRB). It provides the permanent single common representative for France in the Supervisory composition of the General Board of the Anti-Money Laundering Authority (AMLA). It is also a member of the European Systemic Risk Board (ESRB).

== History ==
=== Background ===
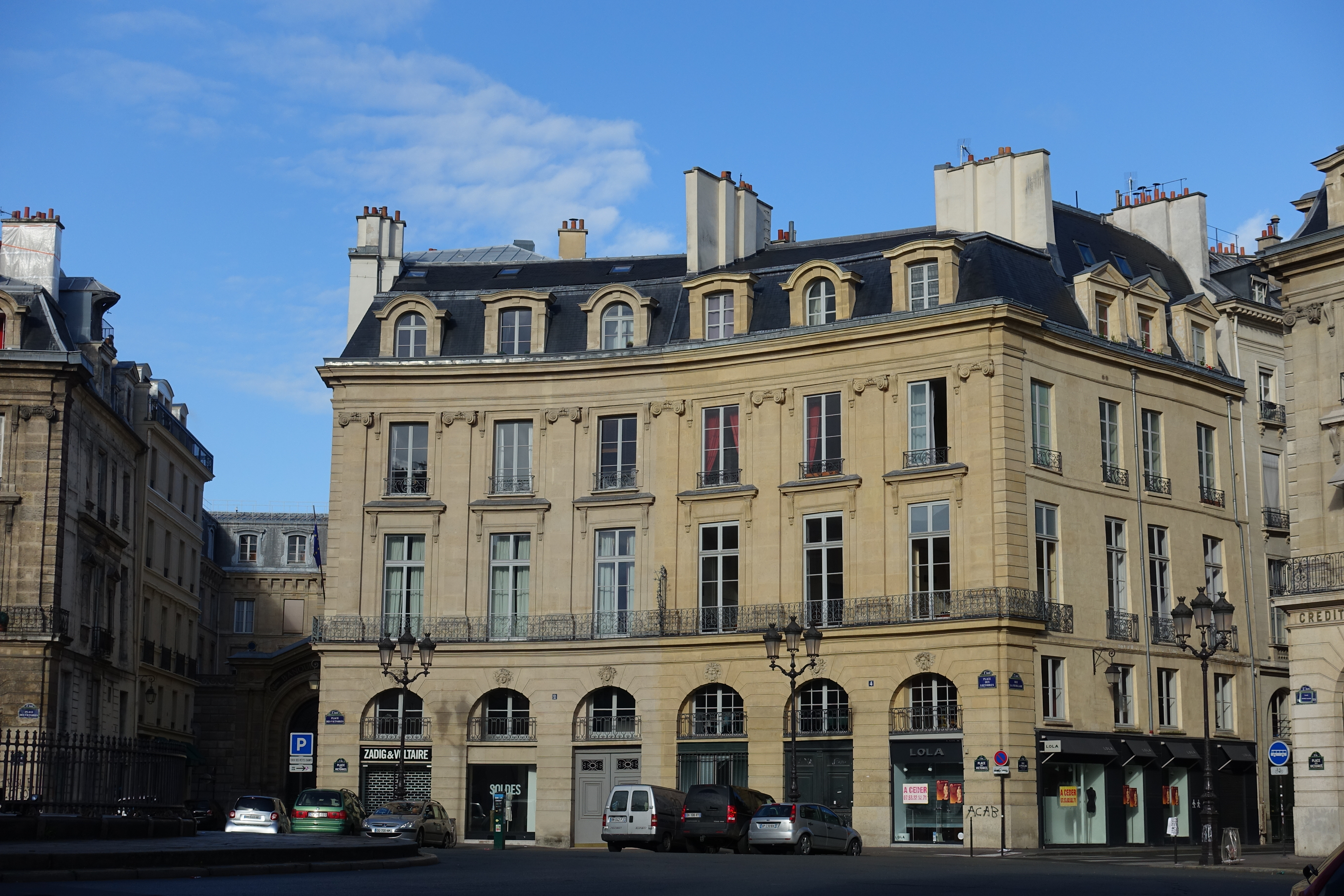
Building at 4 place des Victoires in Paris (right), where the Commission de Contrôle des Banques was located in the 1970s; with the Bank of France in the background

A number of financial supervisory authorities were created in France over the years and with various mandates. These included:

- the Bank Supervisory Commission (French: Commission de Contrôle des Banques, CCB), established in 1941 and renamed in 1984 the Banking Commission (French: Commission bancaire)
- the Insurance Supervisory Commission (French: Commission de contrôle des assurances, CCA, est. 1990) and the Mutual Insurance and Health Care Supervisory Commission (French: Commission de contrôle des mutuelles et des institutions de prévoyance, CCMIP, est. 1990), merged by law of 1 August 2003 to form the Commission de contrôle des assurances, des mutuelles et des institutions de prévoyance (CCAMIP), renamed in 2005 as Autorité de Contrôle des Assurances et des Mutuelles (ACAM, lit. 'Insurance and Mutuals Supervisory Authority')
- the Committee for Credit Institutions and Investment Companies (French: Comité des établissements de crédit et des entreprises d'investissement, CECEI, est. 1984) and Committee for Insurance Companies (French: Comité des entreprises d'assurance, CEA, est. 2003), separate licensing authorities, respectively, for credit institutions and investment services providers and for insurers

=== Formation and development ===
In January 2010, the ACP was formed by executive order through the merger of the Banking Commission, ACAM, and CECEI.

A new executive order in July 2013 granted it resolution authority, in the context of the formation of the European Single Resolution Mechanism, and correspondingly changed its name from ACP to ACPR.

In 2017, the ACPR lost its previous status of independent administrative authority (Article 24 of Law 2017-55 of 20 January 2017), and thus became more directly integrated into the Bank of France.

From July 2020 to April 2021, the ACPR conducted the first assessment of financial risks resulting from climate change, which included 22 insurance organizations and 9 banking groups.

== Operations ==
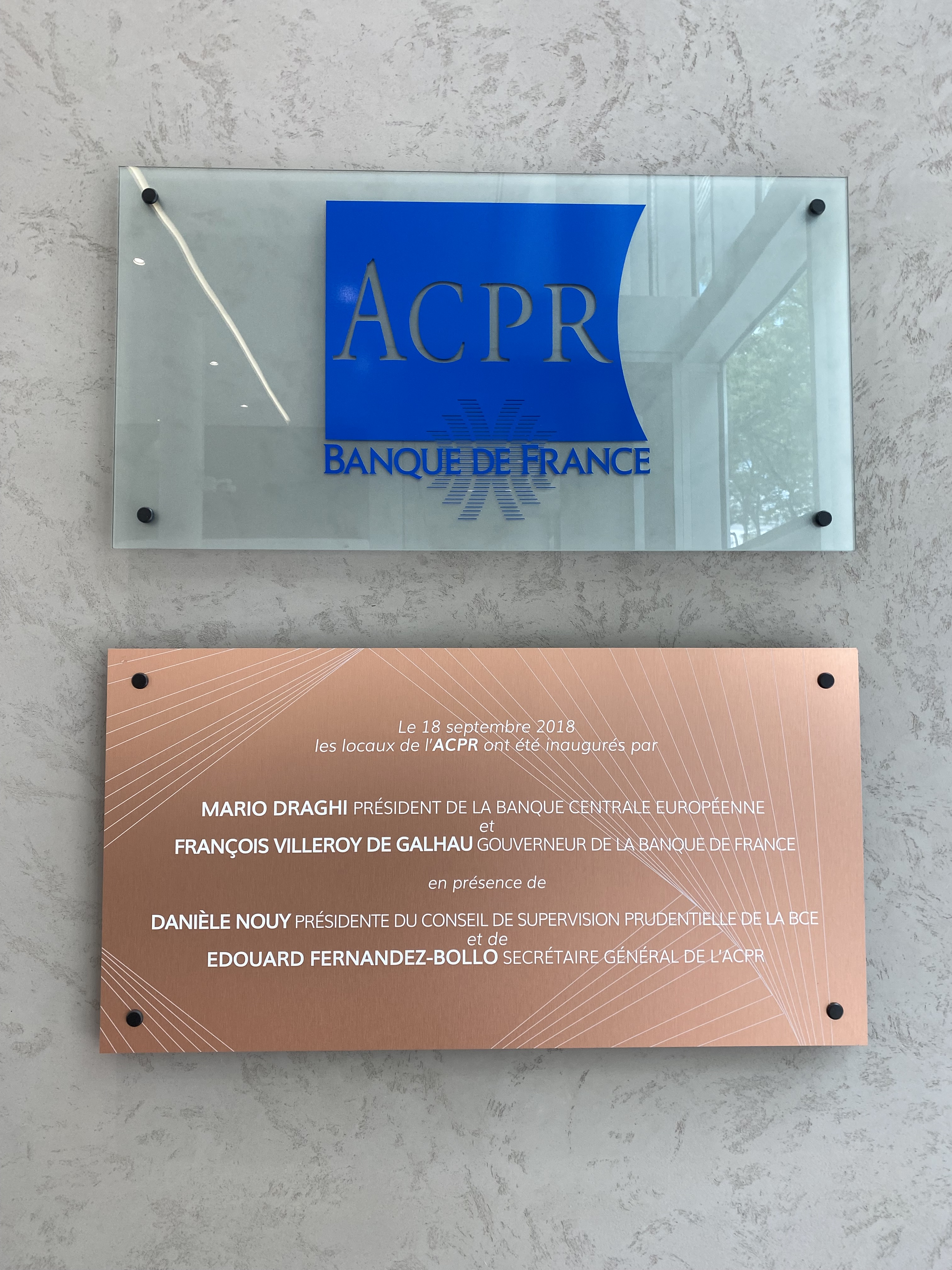
A plaque in the ACPR's lobby emphasizes the authority's embeddedness in European Banking Supervision by memorializing the presence of European Central Bank President Mario Draghi and ECB Supervisory Board Chair Danièle Nouy at the building's inauguration ceremony, together with the ACPR's own chair and Secretary-General

The ACPR's stated purposes include supervision and control, preservation of the stability of the financial system and protection of clients, insured participants and beneficiaries who are subject to its control. The ACPR have supervisory powers, the power to impose administrative enforcement measures, and disciplinary powers with respect to entities under its jurisdiction. It may also make public any information that it deems necessary to discharge its duties.

The ACPR has three different decision-making bodies: the Supervisory College, the Resolution College and the Sanctions Committee, as well as some consultative bodies, such as the Audit Committee and the Scientific Consultative Committee. It occasionally launches public consultations on different issues, as was the case in 2013, when it drafted the regulations for crowdfunding following a public consultation launched alongside the Autorité des marchés financiers and the French Ministry of the Economy and Finance.

== Leadership ==
The ACPR's chairman is the Governor of the Bank of France. The Secretary-General (French: secrétaire général) is the ACPR's chief executive officer. The successive Secretaries-General of ACP, then ACPR have been:

- Danièle Nouy (March 2010 - December 2013), previously Secretary-General of the Banking Commission since 2003
- Edouard Fernandez-Bollo (January 2014 - September 2019)
- Dominique Laboureix (October 2019 - January 2023)
- Nathalie Aufauvre (January 2023 – January 2026)
- Emmanuelle Assouan (since January 2026)

== See also ==
- Autorité des marchés financiers (France)
- Tracfin
- List of financial supervisory authorities by country
