= Andrea Enria =

Italian economist (born 1961)

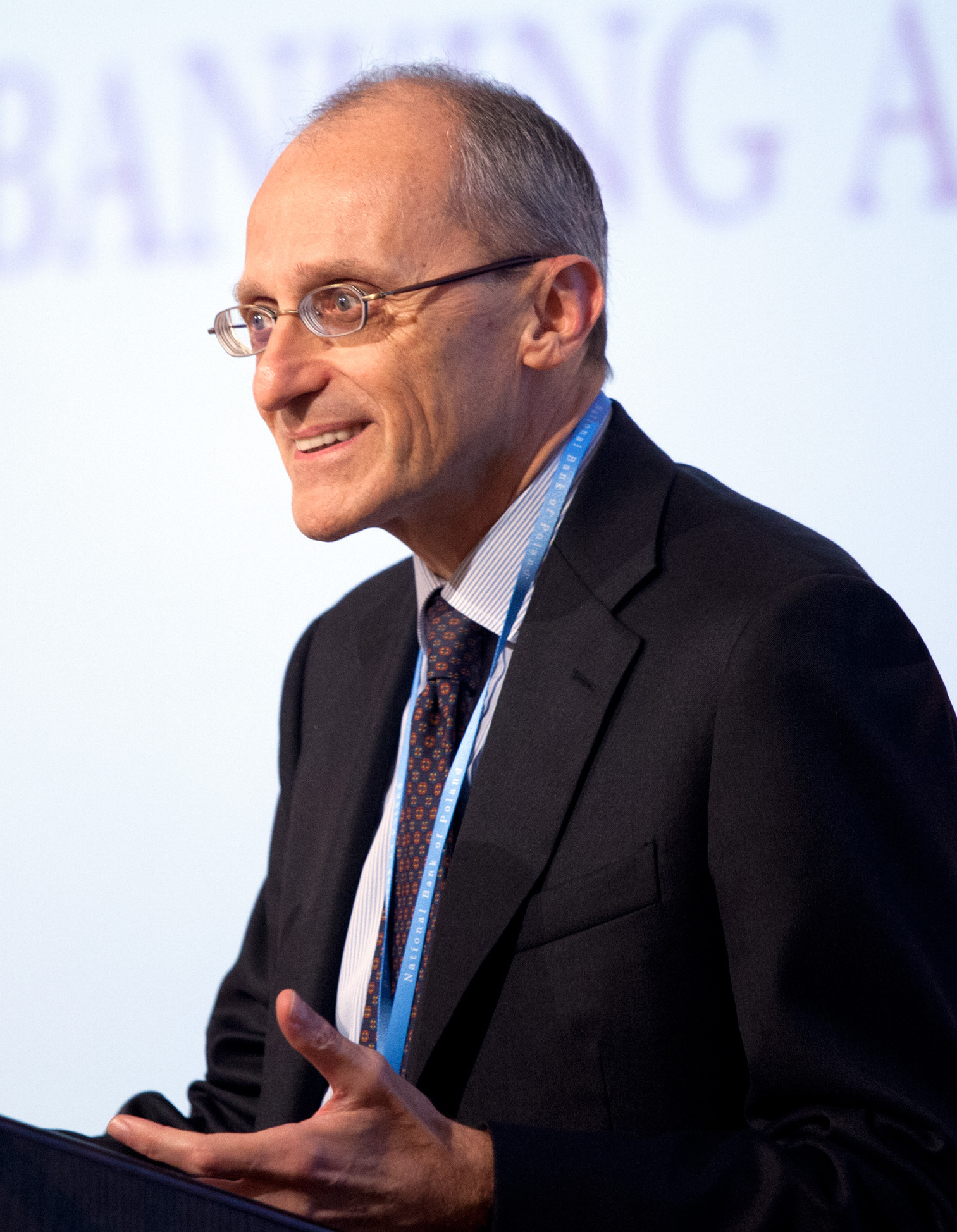
- Enria in 2012

Chair of the ECB Supervisory Board
- In office 1 January 2019 – 1 January 2024
- Preceded by: Danièle Nouy
- Succeeded by: Claudia Buch

Chair of the European Banking Authority
- In office 1 January 2011 – 1 January 2019
- Preceded by: Position established
- Succeeded by: José Manuel Campa

Personal details
- Born: 3 July 1961 (age 64) La Spezia, Italy
- Education: Bocconi University (BA); University of Cambridge (MPhil)
- Occupation: Economist

Andrea Enria (born 3 July 1961) an Italian economist who served as Chair of the ECB Supervisory Board from 2019 to 2023. He previously served as the chairperson of the European Banking Authority (EBA) between 2011 and 2019.

== Early life and education ==
Enria was born in the port of La Spezia and was raised by his father and grandparents after his mother's early death. He studied economics at Bocconi University and holds a M.Phil. degree in economics from the University of Cambridge.

== Career ==
After his studies, Enria joined the Bank of Italy as an economist specialising in banking analysis, competition and regulation. In 1995, he briefly served as adviser to Italian Prime Minister Lamberto Dini.

From 1999 until 2004, Enria worked on banking supervision at the European Central Bank in Frankfurt. In 2004, he became the first secretary general of the newly established Committee of European Banking Supervisors (CEBS), based in London. From 2008 to 2010, he served as head of bank supervision at the Bank of Italy, under the leadership of governor Mario Draghi.

On 16 December 2015 Enria had his post at EBA renewed (until February 2021) after confirmation by the European Parliament previous public hearing held at the Committee on Economic and Monetary Affairs (ECON).

By mid-2018, news media reported that the Italian government would nominate Enria to replace Danièle Nouy as chair of the supervisory board at the European Central Bank; by September 2018, the ECB shortlisted him as one of only three candidates for the position. He was appointed Chair of the ECB Supervisory Board by the Council of the European Union on 6 December 2018 for a five-year term as of 1 January 2019.
