= Jörg Asmussen =

German economist (born 1966)

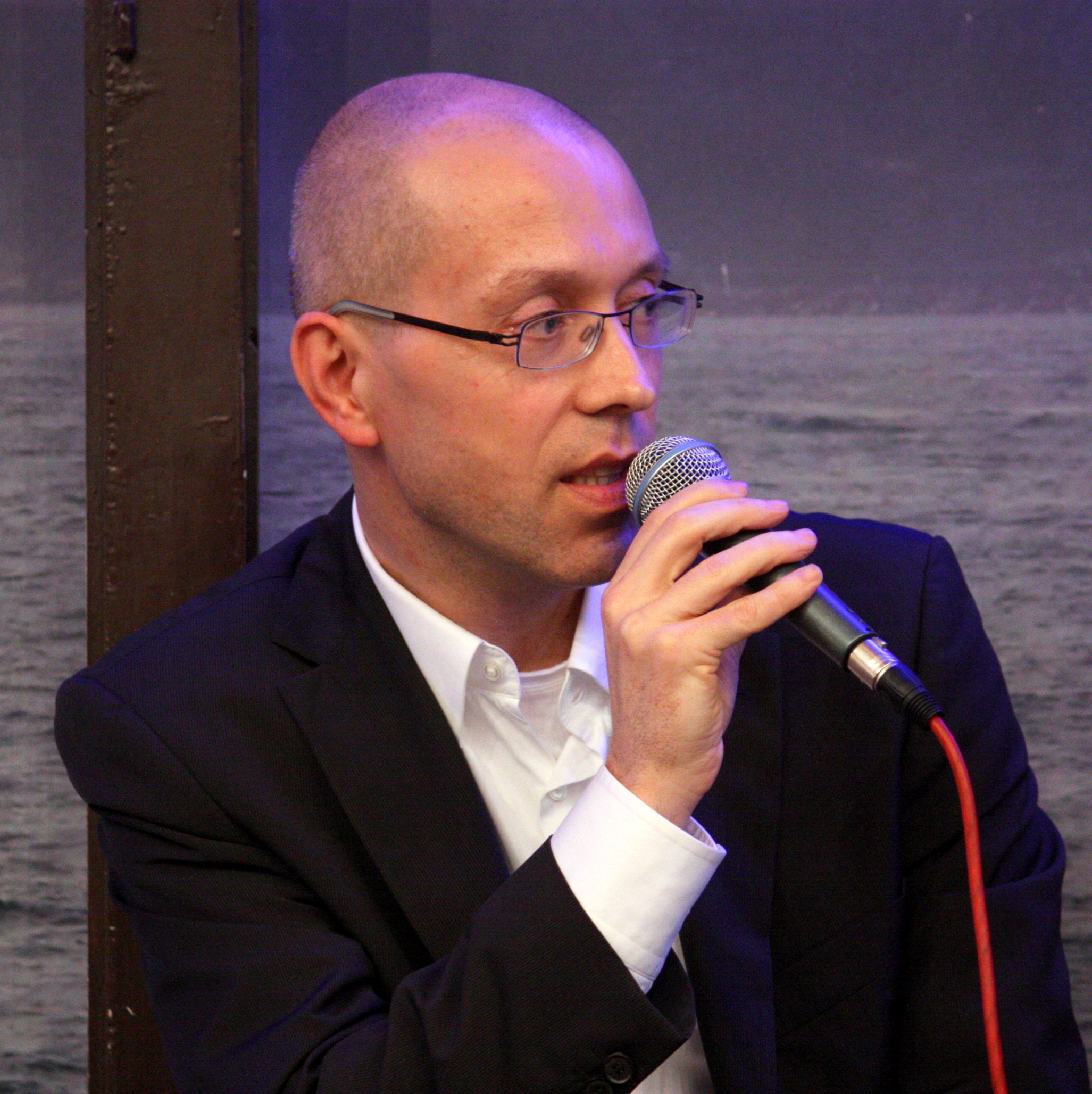

Permanent State Secretary for the Federal Ministry of Labour and Social Affairs
- In office 8 January 2014 – 2018

Member of the Executive Board of the European Central Bank
- In office 1 January 2012 – 8 January 2014
- Preceded by: Jürgen Stark
- Succeeded by: Sabine Lautenschläger

State Secretary of the Federal Ministry of Finance
- In office 2008–2011

Personal details
- Born: 31 October 1966 (age 60) Flensburg, West Germany (now Germany)
- Party: Social Democratic Party
- Education: Bocconi University; University of Bonn

Jörg Asmussen (born 31 October 1966) is a German economist and politician who was State Secretary of the Federal Ministry of Finance from 2008 to 2011 and Parliamentary State Secretary for the Federal Ministry of Labour and Social Affairs from 2014 to 2016. He has been Chief Executive Officer of the German Insurance Association (GDV) since 2020.

Asmussen was a member of the Executive Board of the European Central Bank (ECB) from 2012 to 2014. He also served in the German federal government, most prominently as State Secretary at the Federal Ministry of Labour and Social Affairs from 2014 to 2016 and the Federal Ministry of Finance from 2008 to 2011. Asmussen has been a member of the Social Democratic Party of Germany (SDP) since 1987.

After leaving the government, Asmussen joined the investment bank Lazard in 2016 as managing director in financial advisory and rose to head of M & A for Europe and head of the Financial Institutions Group for Continental Europe.

== Early life and education ==
Asmussen earned a master's degree in business administration, Bocconi University in 1992 and a Diplom degree in economics, University of Bonn in 1994. In Bonn, he studied under Manfred J. M. Neumann and Axel A. Weber alongside Jens Weidmann, among others.

== Career in the public sector ==
After two years (1994–96) at the Institut für Sozialforschung und Gesellschaftspolitik in Cologne, Asmussen held a succession of positions in the German Federal Ministry of Finance.

As a financial advisor of the coalition government 2005–2009 and as the Finance Ministry's representative for True Sale International, an association of banks and financial service interest groups in Germany, Asmussen supported bank deregulation and an extension of the market of asset-backed securities (ABSs). Some sources highlighted his role before the 2008 financial crisis. Whilst at the Ministry, Asmussen was responsible for the German Federal Financial Supervisory Authority (Bafin) at the time when the Düsseldorf based IKB Deutsche Industriebank had to be restructured – mainly due to ABS investments. Asmussen was member of the supervisory board of that bank at that time (2007).

=== State Secretary at the German Federal Ministry of Finance, 2008–11 ===
From 2008 to 2011, Asmussen was State Secretary at the Ministry led by Wolfgang Schäuble, responsible for the Directorate's fiscal policy and macroeconomic affairs, financial market policy and European policy. He led the country's crisis management team following the bankruptcy of Lehman Brothers in 2008. He later became a central figure in negotiations with other euro zone countries on how to deal with the sovereign debt crisis.

During his time in office, Asmussen also was chairman of the Administrative Council of Germany's Federal Financial Supervisory Authority (BaFin); chairman of the inter-ministerial steering committee of the Financial Market Stabilisation Authority (FMSA); member of the Financial Stability Board (FSF); and board member of the European Financial Stability Facility (EFSF). In addition, he was on the supervisory boards of Deutsche Telekom and Deutsche Gesellschaft für Internationale Zusammenarbeit (GIZ).

In May 2011, Asmussen – acting on behalf the German government – endorsed deploying the European Bank for Reconstruction and Development through loans to business in the Middle East, under the condition that countries make "a firm commitment to the core principles of democracy, political pluralism and the market economy." At the time, the EBRD was led by fellow German Social Democrat Thomas Mirow and pushing to extend its mandate to North Africa as part of a larger effort by Europe and the United States to help countries in the region during the Arab Spring.

On 7 June 2011 Asmussen attended the state dinner hosted by President Barack Obama in honor of Chancellor Angela Merkel at the White House.

In November 2011, Asmussen was Chancellor Merkel's acting Sherpa to the G20 summit.

=== Executive Board of the European Central Bank, 2012–14 ===
In January 2012, Asmussen was appointed to the Executive Board of the European Central Bank under the leadership of President Mario Draghi, succeeding Jürgen Stark who had resigned because of his dismay over central bank bond-buying. The selection of Asmussen was announced at the meeting of Group of 7 countries in Marseille, France. At the time, his nomination was controversial in the German parliament, where members of the parties in chancellor Angela Merkel's center-right coalition – Christian Democratic Union, the Christian Social Union and the Free Democratic Party – expressed skepticism because he was known to be a member of the then-opposition Social Democratic party.

Originally rumoured to be appointed as chief economist of the ECB,—a position for which French ECB board member Benoît Cœuré was also a candidate—Asmussen was instead given responsibility for International and European Relations on the board, which Draghi has expanded to include attending, alongside himself, meetings of Eurozone government leaders and finance ministers. Belgian Peter Praet was given responsibility for the Economics department. Some saw the debate around this appointment as highly controversial, when questions were asked about the North-South balance in the ECB's governing structure.

Throughout his tenure, Asmussen often helped communicate policy to – as New York Times described it – a German public fearful that the ECB was a conduit for transferring their wealth to stricken countries like Greece. In German media, he was publicly supportive of bank measures to subdue the euro zone crisis that were unpopular in Germany. In doing so, he presented a counterweight to officials like Jens Weidmann, president of the Bundesbank, who were highly critical of the ECB.

In June 2013, Asmussen defended ECB policies in testimony to the Federal Constitutional Court of Germany after citizens' groups challenged their constitutionality. Asmussen and Weidmann gave opposing evidence to the German Constitutional Court this year in a hearing to determine the legality of the Outright Monetary Transactions program. Countering Weidmann's testimony, Asmussen argued the OMT program did not relieve countries of the need to reform their own economies as they would have to sign up to rescue plans monitored by the EU's bailout fund, the International Monetary Fund and the European Commission. While Weidmann argued that bond markets exert discipline on countries' finances, Asmussen said the euro area faced break-up last year as investors began to price in an end to the currency.

In early 2013, Asmussen represented the ECB in talks with the European Commission and the International Monetary Fund over aid to Cyprus, a member of the euro zone. They worked out a plan that would have forced depositors to finance much of a bailout of the country's banks. After an outcry, they revised the plan. Draghi later called the plan "not smart," an implicit rebuke to Asmussen.

Asmussen's term at the ECB was scheduled to run until 2019. However, he resigned from his post to join German Chancellor Merkel's government in December 2013, saying he wanted to spend more time with his partner and two young children in Berlin. At the time, he was mentioned in the media as a possible finance minister if the SPD had managed to grasp control of the ministry from incumbent Wolfgang Schäuble in the negotiations on a coalition government following the 2013 elections.

=== State Secretary at the Federal Ministry of Labour and Social Affairs, 2014–16 ===
In his position as State Secretary under Labor Minister Andrea Nahles, Asmussen oversaw the introduction of a national minimum wage.

During a 2015 conference in Berlin, Asmussen held that "the core of European integration for the future is the eurozone" and argued in favor of "a deeper federal integration of the eurozone, which would mean gradually creating new institutions such as an EU finance ministry or a eurozone budget."

In late 2015, Economy Minister Sigmar Gabriel and Finance Minister Wolfgang Schäuble reached agreement on Asmussen moving to a managerial position at Germany's state development bank KfW, which ultimately did not happen due to a disagreement with the KfW management.

== Career in the private sector ==
Upon leaving politics, Amussen has taken on numerous positions on corporate boards, including the following:

- Funding Circle, non-executive director of the board
- Generali Investments Europe, independent member of the board of directors (since 2016)
- Lazard, managing director in Financial Advisory (since 2016)

In 2020, Asmussen was appointed managing director of the German Insurance Association (GDV).

== Other activities ==
=== Corporate boards ===
- Deutsche Bahn, ex-officio member of the supervisory board (2008–2011)
- Deutsche Telekom, ex-officio member of the supervisory board (2008–2011)
- Deutsche Postbank AG, ex-officio member of the supervisory board (2005–2008)
- Euler Hermes Kreditversicherungs AG, ex-officio member of the supervisory board (2007–2008)
- IKB Deutsche Industriebank, ex-officio member of the supervisory board (2005–2008)

=== Non-profit organizations ===
- Grüner Wirtschaftsdialog, Member of the Advisory Board (since 2021)
- House of Finance, Goethe University Frankfurt, Member of the Board of Trustees
- Jacques Delors Institute Berlin, deputy chairman of the advisory board

== Controversy ==
In a September 2014 opinion piece for Berliner Zeitung and Les Échos, Asmussen and European Central Bank executive board member Benoît Cœuré wrote that "Germany can use some of its budgetary room of maneuver to support investment and reduce tax wedges – the difference between what employers pay in wages and the total take-home pay for workers – while preserving its sound fiscal position. In doing so, it would tackle some its own future economic challenges." The two officials also called on France to press ahead with labour market reforms while sticking to the budget deficit targets agreed with the European Commission. "The article does not reflect current government policy and we don't agree," a spokesperson for Germany's finance ministry said.

Amid the German debate on extending Greece's credit plan following the election of Alexis Tsipras in early 2015, tensions in Chancellor Merkel's coalition government emerged after the Sächsische Zeitung regional newspaper reported that Asmussen had secretly reached out to Finance Minister Yanis Varoufakis of Greece before an important parliamentary vote, keeping the CDU Finance Minister Wolfgang Schäuble out of the loop.

Government offices
Preceded by Jürgen Stark	Member of the Executive Board of the European Central Bank; 2012–2014	Succeeded by Sabine Lautenschläger
