= Nigerian Financial Intelligence Unit =

Federal Intelligence Unit of Nigeria

Agency overview
- Formed: 2004; 22 years ago
- Superseding agency: Central Bank of Nigeria, Economic and Financial Crimes Commission

Jurisdictional structure
- Operations jurisdiction: Nigeria
- Legal jurisdiction: Financial intelligence and reporting

Operational structure
- Headquarters: Ibrahim Taiwo Street, Asokoro, Abuja

Website
- nfiu.gov.ng

The Nigerian Financial Intelligence Unit (NFIU) is the financial intelligence unit of Nigeria, responsible for collecting and analyzing disclosures from reporting organizations, in order to produce financial intelligence to other agencies combating money laundering, terrorism financing, and other financial crimes. The agency serves as the secretariat of the National Sanctions Committee (NSC) and the Inter-ministerial Committee on Anti-Money Laundering and Counter-Terrorism Financing (IMC). The NFIU is one of the leading FIUs in Africa. The headquarters of the NFIU is located in close proximity to the Aso Villa demonstrating its pivotal role in supporting the Office of the President to gather financial intelligence.

== History ==
The NFIU was established in 2004 as an autonomous unit within the central coordinating body for the country's Anti-Money Laundering, Counter-Terrorist Financing, and Counter-Proliferation Financing (AML/CFT/CPF) framework of Central Bank of Nigeria. It also operates as part of Economic and Financial Crimes Commission.

In 2007, the NFIU joined the Egmont Group of Financial Intelligence Units, an international organization that facilitates cooperation and intelligence sharing between national financial intelligence units to investigate and prevent money laundering and terrorist financing.

In the first quarter of 2022, about N150 trillion worth of transactions in Nigeria were reported as “suspicious” by the NFIU.

In January 2023, NFIU issued a ban on the federal, state, and local governments from making cash withdrawals from their own accounts. According to the NFIU, this was implemented as a measure to curb financial abuses of government funds as state governments had withdrawn a total of N701 billion cash from 2015 till January 2023. This was criticized by the Nigerian Governors Forum which stated that the NFIU advisory and guidelines on cash transactions were outside the agency's mandate.
