= Supervisory Board of the European Central Bank =

Decision-making body within the European Central Bank

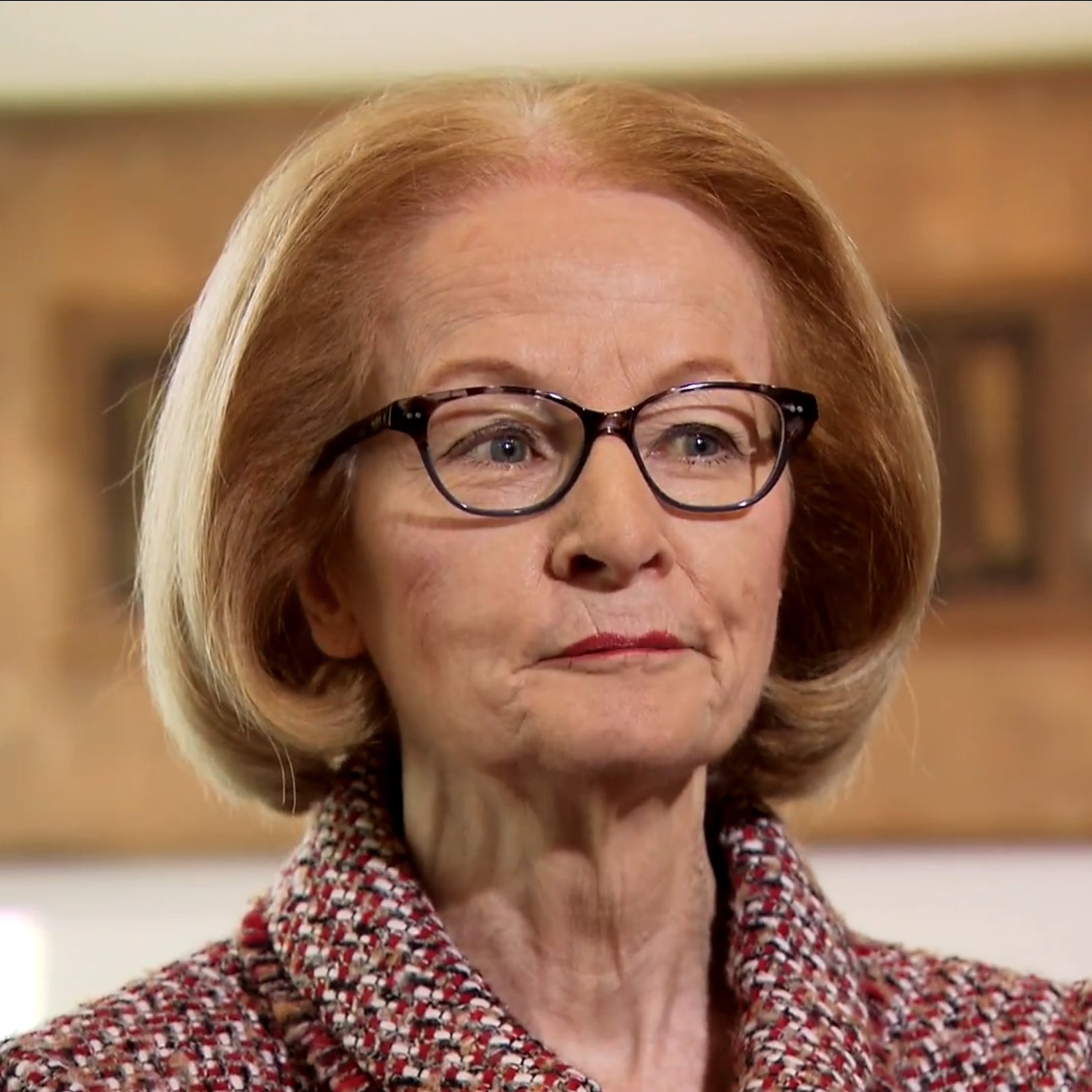
Danièle Nouy was the first chair of the ECB Supervisory Board

The Supervisory Board of the European Central Bank is the main operational decision-making body within the European Central Bank on bank supervision matters, within the framework of European Banking Supervision. It meets twice a month to discuss, plan and carry out the ECB's supervisory tasks. It is not, however, the ultimate decision-making body, as it only prepares draft decisions for the Governing Council under a no-objection procedure.

== Overview ==
The Supervisory Board is composed of a Chair, appointed for a non-renewable term of five years; a Vice Chair, chosen from among the members of the ECB's Executive Board; four members directly appointed by the ECB, known as ECB representatives; and representatives of national competent authorities. If the national supervisory authority designated by a Member State is not the country's national central bank, the representative of the competent authority can be accompanied by a representative from that national central bank. In such cases, the representatives are together considered as one member for the purposes of the voting procedure.

The Supervisory Board's Steering Committee supports its activities and prepares its meetings. It is composed of the Supervisory Board's Chair and Vice Chair, one of the ECB representatives, and five representatives of national competent authorities. The latter five representatives are appointed by the Supervisory Board for one year based on a rotation system that ensures a fair representation of countries.

== Membership ==
=== Chair ===
- Danièle Nouy (1 January 2014 - 31 December 2018)
- Andrea Enria (1 January 2019 - 31 December 2023)
- Claudia Buch (from 1 January 2024)

=== Vice Chair ===
- Sabine Lautenschläger (11 February 2014 - 11 February 2019)
- Yves Mersch (7 October 2019 - 14 December 2020)
- Frank Elderson (since February 2021)

=== ECB representatives ===
- Ignazio Angeloni (2014-2019)
- Sirkka Hämäläinen (2014-2016)
- Julie Dickson (2014-2017)
- Luc Coene (2015-2017)
- Pentti Hakkarainen (2017-2022)
- Edouard Fernandez-Bollo (2019-2024)
- Kerstin af Jochnick (2019-2024)
- Elizabeth McCaul (2019-2024)
- Anneli Tuominen (since 2022)
- Sharon Donnery (since 2024)
- Pedro Machado (since 2024)
- Patrick Montagner (since 2024)

=== National competent authorities ===
- Austria: Financial Market Authority accompanied by Oesterreichische Nationalbank (since 2014)
- Belgium: National Bank of Belgium (since 2014)
- Bulgaria: Bulgarian National Bank (since 2020)
- Croatia: Croatian National Bank (since 2020)
- Cyprus: Central Bank of Cyprus (since 2014)
- Estonia: Financial Supervisory Authority accompanied by Bank of Estonia (since 2014)
- Finland: Financial Supervisory Authority accompanied by Bank of Finland (since 2014)
- France: Prudential Supervision and Resolution Authority (since 2014)
- Germany: Federal Financial Supervisory Authority accompanied by Deutsche Bundesbank (since 2014)
- Greece: Bank of Greece (since 2014)
- Ireland: Central Bank of Ireland (since 2014)
- Italy: Bank of Italy (since 2014)
- Latvia: Bank of Latvia (since 2014)
- Lithuania: Bank of Lithuania (since 2015)
- Luxembourg: Commission de Surveillance du Secteur Financier accompanied by Central Bank of Luxembourg (since 2014)
- Malta: Malta Financial Services Authority accompanied by the Central Bank of Malta (since 2014)
- Netherlands: De Nederlandsche Bank (since 2014)
- Portugal: Banco de Portugal (since 2014)
- Slovakia: National Bank of Slovakia (since 2014)
- Slovenia: Bank of Slovenia (since 2014)
- Spain: Bank of Spain (since 2014)

=== Other national central banks ===
In addition to designated NCAs, the following National Central Banks are represented on the Supervisory Board despite not being financial supervisory authorities on their own: Austrian National Bank, Deutsche Bundesbank, Bank of Estonia, Bank of Finland, Bank of France, Central Bank of Luxembourg, and Central Bank of Malta.

== See also ==
- Executive Board of the European Central Bank
