= German Financial Intelligence Unit =

German government agency that examines suspicious transactions

The Central Office for Financial Transaction Investigations (Zentralstelle für Finanztransaktionsuntersuchungen) is the official name of the Financial Intelligence Unit (FIU) in Germany. It serves as the national central agency responsible for receiving, collecting, and analyzing reports of suspicious financial transactions that may be related to money laundering or the financing of terrorism (cf. § 89c of the German Criminal Code).

The Central Office for Suspicious Activity Reports was established after the September 11, 2001 attacks. Initially, the FIU was set up as a police unit within the Federal Criminal Police Office (Bundeskriminalamt). On June 26, 2017, it was reorganized as a division within Directorate VIII – Customs Investigation Office of the General Directorate of Customs (Generalzolldirektion), transferring its responsibilities to the German customs administration. On May 1, 2021, the FIU was reorganized as its own department—Directorate X—within the General Directorate of Customs.

Since Wirecard AG went bankrupt, the FIU has faced public criticism for how it dealt with suspicious activity reports linked to the company.

== Tasks ==
The Central Unit for Financial Transaction Investigations operates under the German Money Laundering Act (Geldwäschegesetz). According to Section 27 of the Act, the FIU is the central reporting office for preventing and detecting money laundering and terrorist financing. It also supports efforts to combat these crimes in line with the EU Anti-Money Laundering Directive. The FIU is an administrative authority, not a law enforcement or investigative agency. It acts without the need for formal suspicion and below the threshold required to launch criminal proceedings.

According to Section 28 of the German Money Laundering Act (GwG), the specific responsibilities include:

- Receiving and collecting suspicious activity reports,
- Conducting operational analyses, including the assessment of reports and other relevant information,
- Exchanging information and coordinating with domestic supervisory authorities,
- Cooperating and exchanging information with financial intelligence units in other countries,
- Prohibiting transactions and ordering other immediate measures,
- Sharing the results of operational analyses (as mentioned in item 2) and any additional relevant information with the appropriate domestic public authorities,
- Providing feedback to the reporting party who submitted a report under Section 43 (1),
- Conducting strategic analyses and preparing reports based on those analyses,
- Sharing information with the organizations that are required to report, as well as with local regulators and public authorities that deal with spotting, stopping, or investigating money laundering and terrorist financing—especially when it comes to common patterns and methods used,
- Gathering statistics as required by Article 44(2) of the EU's Anti-Money Laundering Directive (2015/849) and putting together a yearly report that brings all the numbers together,
- Releasing an annual report that sums up the operational analyses they've done,
- Taking part in national and international working group meetings,
- Handling any other tasks they're given under different legal rules.

In 2017, the Financial Intelligence Unit (FIU) was moved from the Federal Criminal Police Office (BKA) to the German Customs Authority (Bundeszollverwaltung). Along with that shift came some major changes: more types of businesses and professionals were now required to file reports, there was a stronger push to raise awareness among those who have to report, and the rules for when a suspicious activity report needs to be submitted under the Money Laundering Act were updated.

The Financial Intelligence Unit handles suspicious transaction reports. It reviews and filters these reports, passing on only the important ones to the right police or investigation agencies. Because it receives so many reports, the FIU uses a risk-based method to decide which ones to focus on. To help with its work, it also uses information from government databases, not just its own records.

Since 2017, the FIU's data access has been gradually expanded:

- INPOL, the police information network maintained by the German Federal Criminal Police Office (BKA);
- The Central Register of Prosecution Proceedings (ZStV);
- The Central Foreigners Register (AZR); and account data retrieval.

Since 2020, the FIU has additionally been able to access certain basic tax data and information from property acquisition notifications related to real estate transactions.

== Organisation ==
In 2017, the FIU was transferred from the Federal Criminal Police Office to the Customs Administration. On 4 March 2021, the Bundestag approved a legislative amendment. It came into force on 30 March 2021. The amendment transformed the FIU from Department VIII into an independent Directorate X within the General Customs Directorate. Within this structure, it functions as an operationally autonomous authority. Currently, the FIU consists of one department within the directorate (DX.A).

The department is divided into the following divisions:

- DX.A.1: Risk Management, Coordination and Steering
- DX.A.2: Policy and International Cooperation
- DX.A.3: National Cooperation and Coordination, PPP
- DX.A.4: Strategic Analysis
- DX.A.5: Operational Case Analysis
- DX.A.6: Case Inquiries and State Protection
- DX.A.7: Technology

The FIU is being restructured as more staff are added. In the future, it is expected to have two departments. On 1 December 2021, the FIU opened an additional office in Dresden for operational and strategic analysis tasks.
