= Indonesian Financial Transaction Reports and Analysis Center =

Government anti-money laundering agency

Indonesian Financial Transaction Reports and Analysis Centre
- Pusat Pelaporan dan Analisis Transaksi Keuangan
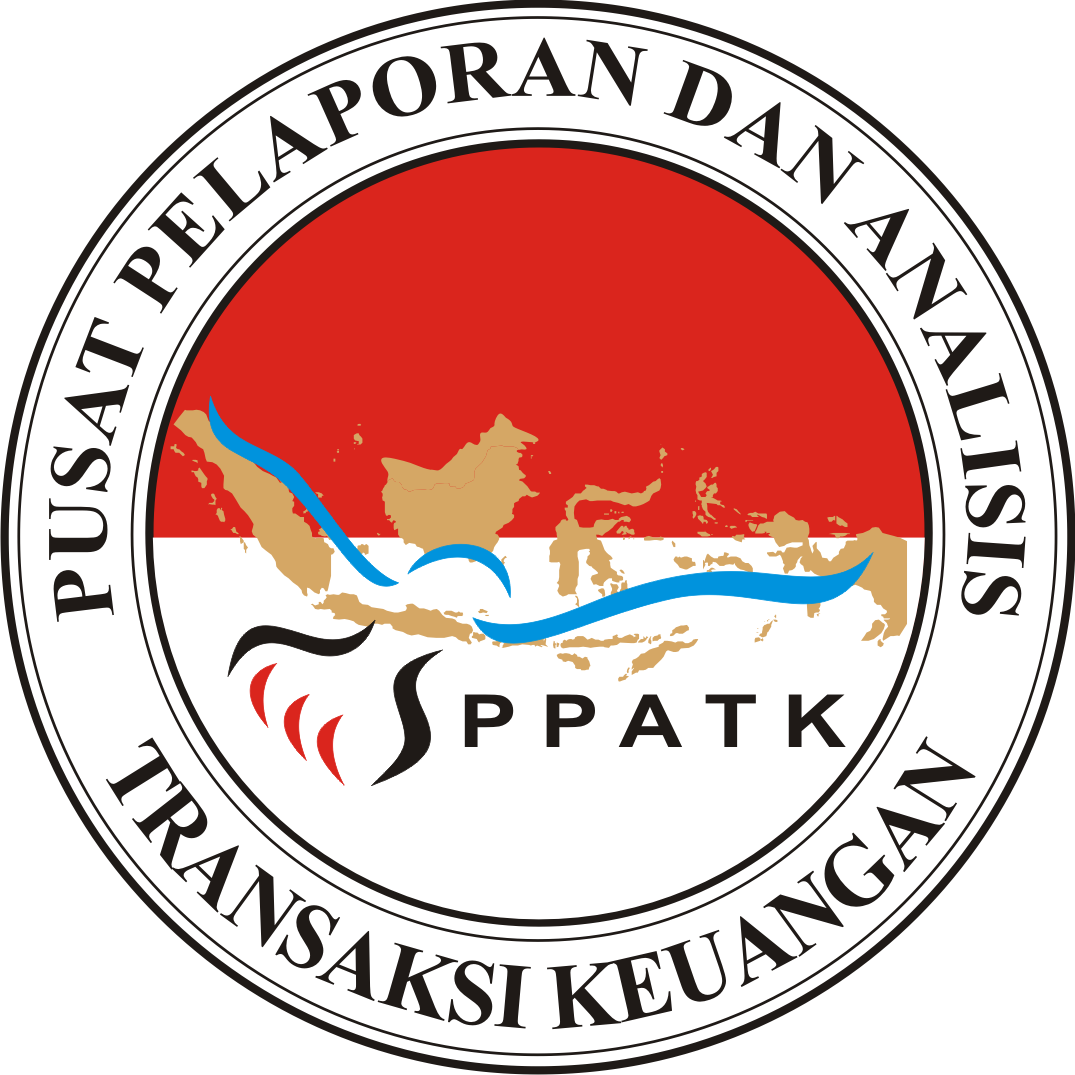

Agency overview
- Formed: 2002
- Type: Financial Intelligence Unit
- Jurisdiction: Government of Indonesia
- Headquarters: Jalan Ir. Haji Juanda No.35, Kb. Kelapa, Gambir, Central Jakarta, Jakarta, Indonesia
- Employees: 562 (2021)
- Agency executive: Ivan Yustiavandana, Head of PPATK/INTRAC
- Website: www.ppatk.go.id

The Indonesian Financial Transaction Reports and Analysis Centre or INTRAC (Indonesian: Pusat Pelaporan dan Analisis Transaksi Keuangan, PPATK) is a government agency of Indonesia responsible for financial intelligence. The agency was formed in 2002 to prevent and eradicate suspected illicit financial flows as money laundering and provide information on transnational organized crime and terrorist financing.

== History ==
In 1997, Indonesia officially signed and ratified United Nations Convention Against Illicit Traffic in Narcotic Drugs and Psychotropic Substances of 1988. As one of signatory countries, Indonesia obliged to consider money laundering as criminal act and required to have measure to identify, trace, or confiscate money in relation to illicit traffic in narcotics drugs. At the same year, Asia/Pacific Group on Money Laundering is also founded, which Indonesia officially joined in 2000.

The second Financial Action Task Force (FATF) report published in June 2001 and including a supplemental report in September, denoted Indonesia as one of non-cooperative countries. As response, Bank Indonesia issued Bank Indonesia Regulation No. 3/10/PBI/2001 on Know your customer principle, which requires financial institution to identify its customer and its transactional profile, and trace money source. And refer to this regulation, financial transaction reports and analysis is officially conducted by special investigation unit of Bank Indonesia.

On the next year, Law No. 15 Year 2002 regarding money laundering issued to further strengthen effort on combatting money laundering and PPATK was officially formed. Since 2010, PPATK is regulated by Law No. 8 Year 2010. PPATK's mandate was expanded in 2013 to provide information regarding terrorist financing by Law No. 9 Year 2013.

== Duty and function ==
Duty and Function of PPATK are as follows:

1. Prevention and eradication of money laundering crime
2. Data and information management
3. Supervision of the compliance of the reporting parties
4. Analyze or investigation of financial transactions that there are reasonable grounds to suspect are related to the commission of a money laundering offence or other crimes

PPATK, among other, is authorized to:

1. Obtain data and information from government agencies and/or private institutions which authorized to manage data and information
2. Define guidance to identify suspicious transaction
3. Coordinate with related parties to prevent money laundering
4. Recommend the government to prevent money laundering
5. Represent the government in international organization or forum related to financial intelligence
6. Provide training and education in money laundering prevention

== Structure ==
=== Organization structure ===
Based on Presidential Decree No. 10 Year 2022 and Head of PPATK Regulation No. 5 Year 2022, PPATK consists of:

1. Leadership Elements
  1. Office of the Head of PPATK
  2. Office of the Vice Head of PPATK
2. Main Secretariat
  1. General Affairs Bureau
    1. Division of Household Affairs and Equipments
      1. Sub-division of Procurement Service
    2. Division of Leadership Administration
      1. Sub-division of Leadership Protocol and Security
      2. Sub-division of Leadership Administration
  2. Planning and Finance Bureau
    1. Division of Accountancy Verification and Performance Accountability
  3. Human Resources, Organization, and Administration Bureau
    1. Division of Organization, Administration, and Risks Management
    2. Division of Human Resource Development
3. Deputy I (Strategy and Cooperation)
  1. Directorate of Domestic Strategy and Cooperation
  2. Directorate of International Strategy and Cooperation
  3. Directorate of Law and Regulations
  4. Division of Deputy I Administration Affairs
4. Deputy II (Reporting and Compliance Monitoring)
  1. Directorate of Financial Service Compliance Monitoring
  2. Directorate of Goods and/or Other Services and Profession Compliance Monitoring
  3. Directorate of Reporting
  4. Division of Deputy II Administration Affairs
5. Deputy III (Analysis and Investigation)
  1. Directorate of Analysis and Investigation I (Proactive Analysis and Investigation Related to Corruption, Fiscal Affairs, and Worthiness of State Officials or Other State Strategic Positions Posting)
  2. Directorate of Analysis and Investigation II (Proactive Analysis and Investigation of Money Laundry Related to Financial Crimes, Narcotics, Environmental Crimes, other Crimes, and Terrorism)
  3. Directorate of Analysis and Investigation III (Reactive Analysis and Investigation of Money Laundry Activities, Money Laundry related to Predicated Crimes, and Terrorism)
  4. Division of Deputy III Administration Affairs
6. General Inspectorate
7. Centers
  1. Center of Information and Technology
  2. Center of Education and Training for Anti Money Laundering and Terrorism Funding Prevention/Indonesian Financial Intelligence Institute
  3. Center of Partnership Strengthening for Anti Money Laundering and Terrorism Funding Prevention
8. Experts
  1. Expert for Reporting and Compliance Monitoring Field
  2. Expert for Analysis and Investigation Field

== Training ==
PPATK possessed a specialized center of excellence to train PPATK future operatives, law enforcements, academicians, and experts which interested to anti money laundering and counter terrorist financing as financial intelligence information. The institute called Center of Education and Training for Anti Money Laundering and Terrorism Funding Prevention (Pusat Pendidikan dan Pelatihan Anti Pencucian Uang dan Pencegahan Pendanaan Terorisme, Pusdiklat APU-PPT) or colloquially called as Indonesian Financial Intelligence Institute (Institut Intelijen Keuangan Indonesia, but the official abbreviation is IFII instead of IIKI). The school was founded by Kiagus Ahmad Badaruddin (Head of PPATK) in 2017 and inaugurated by Wiranto on behalf of Joko Widodo on 30 November 2017. Unlike the intelligence schools in Indonesia like PoltekSSN (National Cyber and Crypto Agency) or STIN (Indonesian State Intelligence Agency), IFII does not issue degree.

IFII is the only education institution focusing on financial intelligence in Indonesia and also the whole of Southeast Asia. IFII also housing institution of Center for Money Laundering and Predicated Crime Studies (Pusat Kajian Pencucian Uang dan Tindak Pidana Asal), a research institution dedicated for researching policies and strategies formulation and means to combat money laundering and predicated crimes.

== Gallery ==
Logo of PPATK (2002–2012)

Logo of PPATK (2012–2014)

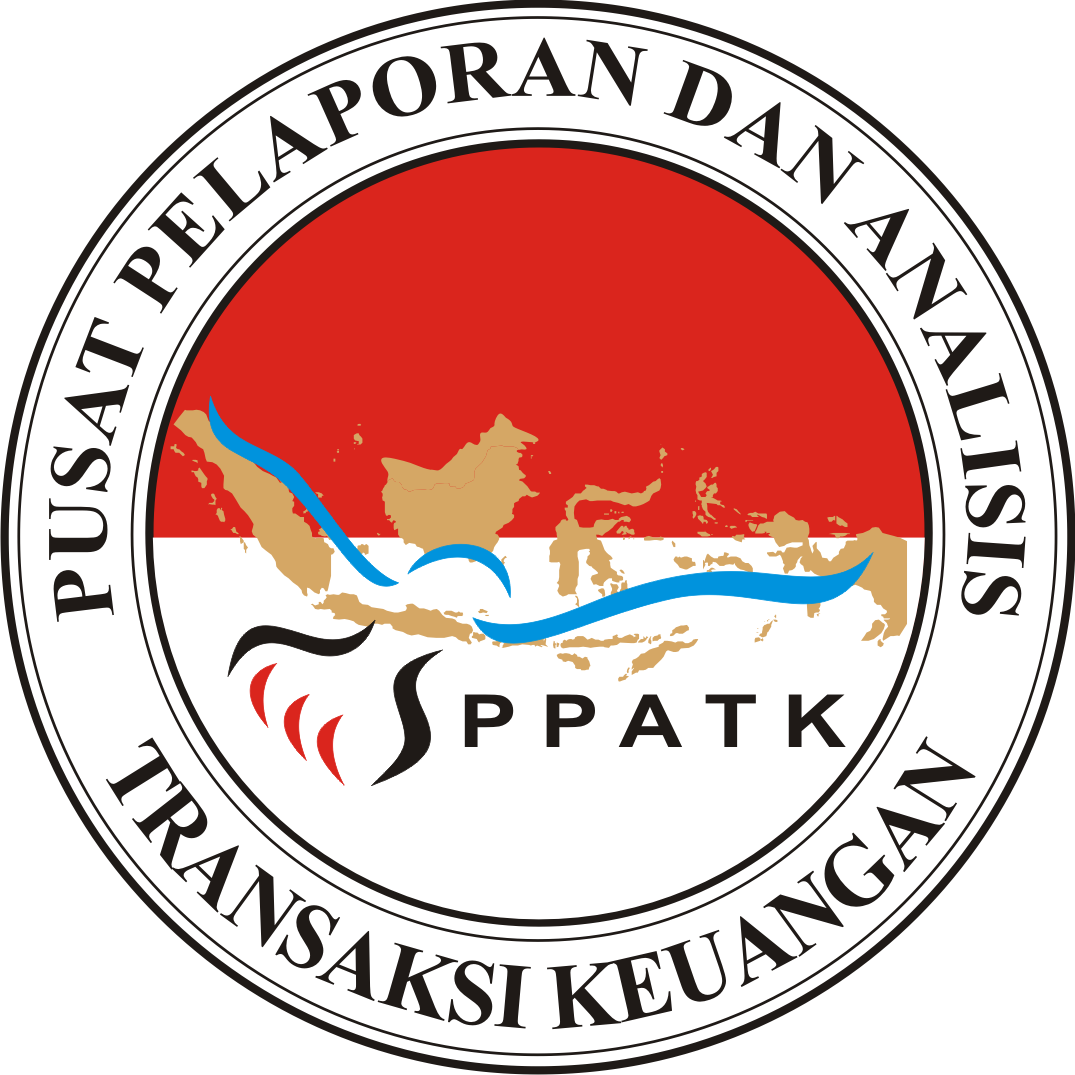
Logo of PPATK (2014–)
