= Anneli Tuominen =

Finnish lawyer and economist

Hilkka Liisa Anneli Tuominen (born 12 November 1954 in Hämeenkyrö) is a Finnish lawyer and economist. She has served in various positions at the Finnish Financial Supervisory Authority for 25 years, most recently as Director General of the Financial Supervisory Authority since 2009. The European Central Bank appointed Tuominen as a member of its Supervisory Board for a five-year term, and she started in her new position in the summer of 2022.

Tuominen has previously worked at Union Bank of Finland Ltd in London from 1986 to 1990 and at the Bank of Finland as a bank manager from 1991 to 1996. At the Financial Supervision Authority, she served as Deputy Director and Head of the Market Supervision Department from 1996 to 2007, and as Director from 2007 to 2008.

The term of office of the Director of the Financial Supervisory Authority is five years, and her third term began in February 2019 but ended in June 2022. Tero Kurenmaa was elected as successor.

Tuominen graduated in economics in 1976, obtained a Master of Laws in 1979, and was appointed deputy judge in 1981. She began her career as a legal advisor at the Tampere Court of Appeals in 1979, moved to Helsinki Bank in 1979, and the United Bank of Finland in 1986. She became Deputy Director of the Financial Supervisory Authority in 1996 and Director in 2007.
