= Elke König =

German MBA in Business and auditor (born 1954)

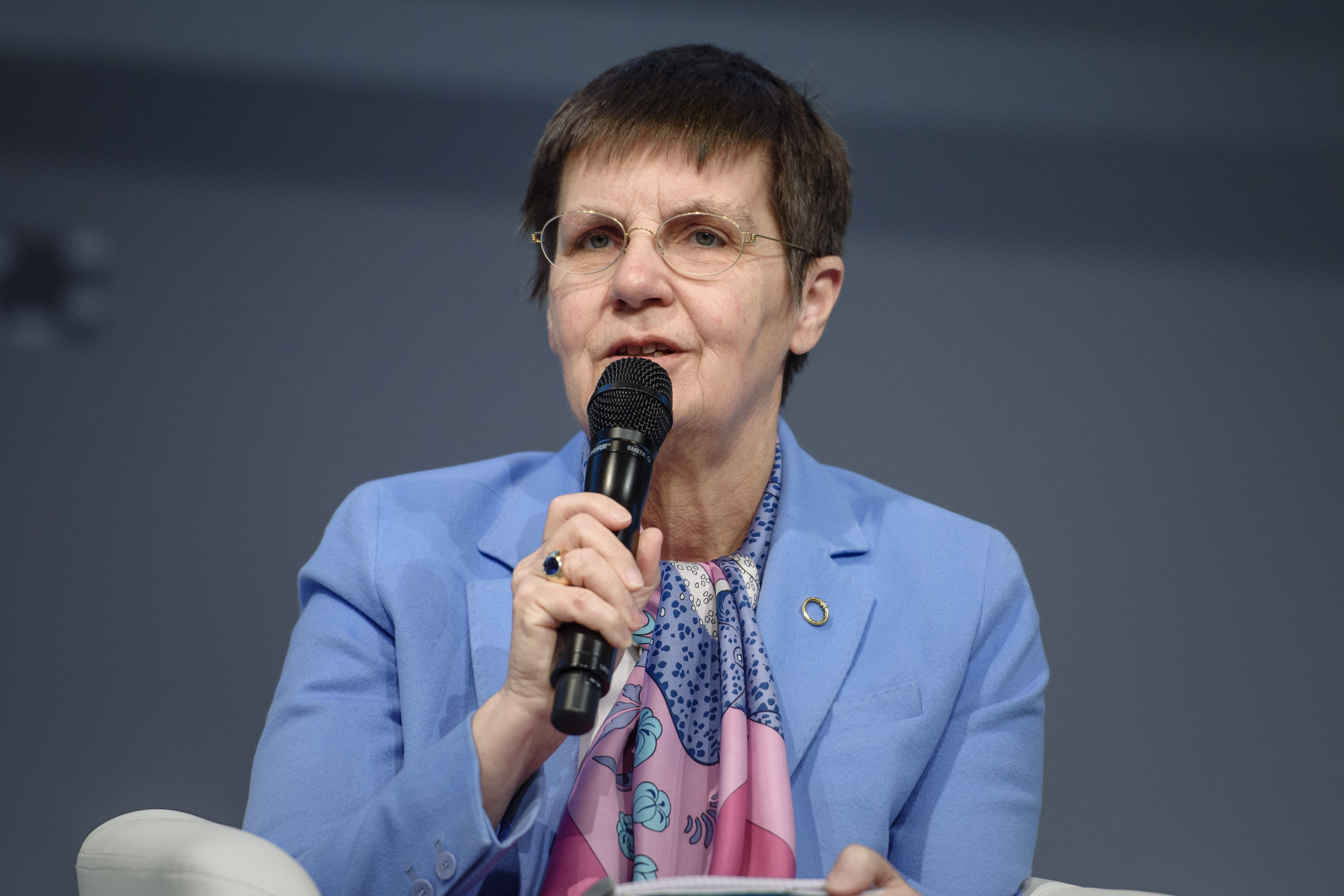
Image of Elke König

Elke König (born 28 January 1954) is a German MBA in Business and auditor. From January 2012, she was president of the Federal Financial Supervisory Authority (BaFin); in December 2014, she became the first Chair of the newly established Single Resolution Board (SRB) of the Single Resolution Mechanism headquartered in Brussels. She served as Chair of the SRB until January 2023, when her second term expired.

== Early life and education ==
König was born near Cologne (Rhineland). She studied Business Administration at the University of Cologne from 1972 to 1976, where she earned a doctoral degree (Dr rer. pol.) between 1976 and 1980.

== Career ==
From 1980 to 1990, König worked for KPMG Deutsche Treuhandgesellschaft in Cologne auditing and advising insurance undertakings, from 1986 as a holder of a special statutory authority (“Prokuristin”) and from 1988 as a director and partner. From 1990 to 2002, as a member of senior management of the Munich Re Group, König was Head of Accounting before moving to Hannover Rückversicherung AG, the world's third-biggest reinsurer at the time, as Chief Financial Officer. From 2010 to end-2011, König was a member of the International Accounting Standards Board (IASB) in London.

=== President of BaFin, 2012–2014 ===
In January 2012, König was the successor of Jochen Sanio as president of the Federal Financial Supervisory Authority (BaFin) in Bonn. The formal handover took place on 24 January 2012 in Frankfurt.

In her capacity as president of BaFin, König also served as a member of the Financial Stability Board. During her time in office, BaFin escalated an investigation into possible manipulation of the euro interbank offered rate (Euribor) to include a special probe of German banks.

In 2013, König and Claudia Buch were cited by German media as contenders for a post on the Executive Board of the European Central Bank that eventually went to Sabine Lautenschläger. In late 2014, König resigned from her post at BaFin; her successor was Felix Hufeld who took office in 2015.

=== Chair of the SRB, 2014–2023 ===
By late 2014, König was nominated by Finance Minister Wolfgang Schäuble for the top job at the SRM, a Eurozone fund designed to limit the fallout from a collapse of the banking system; at the time, Governor of the National Bank of Belgium Luc Coene as well as the former European Investment Bank head, Philippe Maystadt, were considered her contenders for the three-year mandate.

As Chair of the SRB, König is responsible for the management of the organisation, the work of the Board, the budget, all staff, and the Executive and Plenary sessions of the Board. The General Counsel, the Policy Coordination and International Relations Unit, the Communications office and the Internal Audit function report directly to her. In addition to her role in the EU Agency, she chairs the Resolution Steering Group of the Financial Stability Board (FSB).

During her first term in office, König oversaw the sale of Spain's ailing Banco Popular Español to rival Banco Santander, the first wind-down of a eurozone bank under new rules aimed at reducing taxpayers’ costs when lenders fail.

In November 2017, the European Commission proposed to extend König's mandate for five years. In January 2023, when König's second term expired, Dominique Laboureix succeeded her as the new chair of the SRB.

== Other activities ==
- Hannover Center of Finance, Honorary Member
- Institute for Law and Finance (ILF) at the Goethe University Frankfurt, Member of the Board of Trustees (-2015)

== Personal life ==
König is married and has two children. She lives in Hannover.

== Publications ==
- Targeted external accounting for public broadcasters in the Federal Republic of Germany: Reflections on an aligned to the information interests of the audience external accounting . Series of the Institute for Broadcasting Law at the University of Cologne, Vol. 35; simultaneously Dissertation Univ. Cologne 1981. C.H. Beck, Munich 1983, ISBN 3-406-09335-3.
