= Financial Intelligence Unit =

Public body that collects information about suspicious transactions

A financial intelligence unit (FIU) is a national agency that receives reports of suspicious transactions from financial institutions and other persons or entities, analyses them, and disseminates the resulting intelligence to local Law enforcement agencies and foreign agencies. The activities of FIUs are generally geared towards combating tax evasion, money laundering, terrorist financing, Illicit trade, organised crime, or white-collar crimes.

== Overview ==
FIUs are typically not law enforcement agencies; their mission is to process and analyze the information received. If sufficient evidence of unlawful activity is found, the matter is passed to the police or public prosecutors. They complement the apparatus of administrative anti-money laundering supervision, which ensures that obliged entities transmit relevant information to the FIU.

Financial Intelligence Units (FIUs) focus on financial crime. They work by collaborating with stakeholders, law enforcement, regulatory authorities, and international organisations.

National FIUs include:

- Angola – Unidade de Informação Financeira
- Argentina – Unidad de Inteligencia Financiera
- Aruba – Financial Intelligence Unit-Aruba (FIU-Aruba)
- Australia – Australian Transaction Reports and Analysis Centre (AUSTRAC)
- Austria – Geldwäschemeldestelle im Bundeskriminalamt (A –FIU)
- Brazil – COAF Conselho de Controle de Atividade Financeira
- Canada – Financial Transactions and Reports Analysis Centre of Canada (FINTRAC)
- Cyprus – Unit for Combating Money Laundering (MOKAS)
- France – Tracfin
- Germany – German Financial Intelligence Unit – Zentralstelle für Finanztransaktionsuntersuchungen (G-FIU)
- India – Financial Intelligence Unit—India (FIU-IND)
- Indonesia – Indonesian Financial Transaction Reports and Analysis Center (PPATK)
- Ireland – Garda National Economic Crime Bureau (GNECB)
- Italy – Italy's Financial Intelligence Unit (FIU)
- Malta – Financial Intelligence Analysis Unit (FIAU)
- Mexico – Unidad de Inteligencia Financiera (UIF)
- Mongolia – Financial Information Unit of Mongolia (FIU)
- Netherlands – Netherlands Financial Intelligence Unit
- Nigeria — Nigerian Financial Intelligence Unit
- Philippines – Anti-Money Laundering Council (AMLC)
- Russia – Federal Financial Monitoring Service of the Russian Federation (Rosfinmonitoring)
- Saudi Arabia – General Directorate of Financial Intelligence (GDOFI)
- Spain – SEPBLAC
- Turkey – Financial Crimes Investigation Board (MASAK)
- Ukraine – Financial Intelligence Unit
- United Kingdom – National Crime Agency
- United States – Financial Crimes Enforcement Network (FinCEN)

These units often work with each other, sharing information and coordinating efforts to tackle financial crimes on a global scale. They are part of a broader network of organisations and agencies committed to financial security and integrity. The Egmont Group of Financial Intelligence Units is an international network of FIUs. As of June 2026, it has 182 FIU members.

== European Financial Intelligence Unit Network ==
The Financial Intelligence Unit Network (FIU.NET) is a decentralised computer network that provides an information exchange between the financial intelligence units of the European Union. FIU.NET is a decentralised system with no central database where the information is collected. All the connected FIUs have their FIU.NET equipment within their own premises and manage their own information. Through FIU.NET the connected FIUs create bilateral or multilateral cases. Ma^{3}tch (autonomous, anonymous, analysis) is a matching tool within FIU.NET. Ma^{3}tch makes it possible for FIUs to match names in order to find relevant data that is possessed by other connected FIUs. As the data is anonymised, privacy and data protection rules are not breached.

=== Connected FIUs ===
FIU.NET is funded by the European Commission and participating FIUs. Currently, the connected EU member state FIUs are: Austria, Belgium, Bulgaria, Cyprus, Denmark, Estonia, Finland, France, Germany, Greece, Hungary, Ireland, Italy, Latvia, Lithuania, Luxembourg, Malta, Netherlands, Poland, Portugal, Romania, Sweden, Slovenia, Slovakia, Spain, and the United Kingdom.

=== Governing body ===
FIU.NET is governed by a board of partners (BoP) formed by connected FIUs that have volunteered for a seat. The board is chaired by an independent director.

=== Project management ===
Daily operation of the system is managed by the FIU.NET Bureau, a project bureau of the Dutch Ministry of Justice and Security, which is housed in the Europol International headquarters in The Hague.

== FIU reporting in the United States ==
The United States has several laws requiring the reporting to the Financial Crimes Enforcement Network (FinCEN). These include the Right to Financial Privacy Act (RFPA) of 1978, the Bank Secrecy Act of 1970 (and other names of revisions), and the Gramm–Leach–Bliley Act of 1999 (GLBA). Some reports also need to go to the Securities and Exchange Commission.

Representative reports required from US financial institutions
Report and definition	Authority	Receiving agency
Currency Transaction Report (CTR). Cash transactions in excess of $10,000 during the same business day. The amount over $10,000 can be either from one transaction or a combination of cash transactions.	Bank Secrecy Act	Internal Revenue Service
Negotiable Instrument Log (NIL). Cash purchases of negotiable instruments (e.g., money orders, cashiers checks, travelers cheques) having a face value of $3,000, or more.	Bank Secrecy Act	Internal Revenue Service
Suspicious Activity Report (SAR). Any cash transaction where the customer seems to be trying to avoid BSA reporting requirements (e.g., CTR, NIL). A SAR must also be filed if the customer's actions indicate that s/he is laundering money or otherwise violating federal criminal law. The customer must not know that a SAR is being filed.	Bank Secrecy Act	Financial Crimes Enforcement Network

Actions that can trigger a SAR include:

- Any kind of insider abuse of a financial institution, regardless of the amount involved;
- Federal crimes involving transactions through a financial institution if the institution detects the activity and it involves at least $5,000 with a known suspect, or at least $25,000 regardless of whether a suspect can be identified;
- Transactions of at least $5,000 that the institution knows, suspects, or has reason to suspect involve funds from illegal activities or are structured to attempt to hide those funds;
- Transactions of at least $5,000 that the institution knows, suspects or has reason to suspect are designed to evade any regulations promulgated under the Bank Secrecy Act;
- Transactions of at least $5,000 that the institution knows, suspects, or has reason to suspect lack lawful purpose or are inconsistent with the customer's usual behavior and no reasonable explanation is found after investigation. The language of the RFPA indicates that a SAR filed under this rule comes from an individual transaction, not a profile of activities that make the transaction stand out.

== See also ==
- Anti–money laundering
