= Qatar Financial Information Unit =

Qatari government regulatory agency

The Qatar Financial Information Unit (QFIU) is a Qatari government regulatory agency responsible for financial intelligence efforts to combat money laundering and financing of terrorism. Like other national Financial Intelligence Units (FIU) around the world, it requires banks, investment companies, insurers and other financial institutions to report suspicious financial transactions. QFIU then analyzes the information and disseminates the relevant data to law enforcement authorities for further investigation and action.

Founded in 2004, QFIU is led by Ahmad bin Eid al-Thani. Its mission is to “protect the integrity and economy of the State of Qatar through effective exchange of information, transparency enhancement and capacity building to help detect and deter money laundering and terrorism financing activities.” The QFIU is a “semiautonomous component” of Qatar’s National Anti-Money Laundering and Terrorism Financing Committee (NAMLC), and is housed in the Qatar Central Bank. Other national partners include the Qatar Financial Centre, State Security Bureau, Ministry of Interior, Criminal Investigation Department Section of Fighting Economic Crimes, Ministry of Justice, Ministry of Business and Trade, Public Prosecution, General Directorate of Customs, Financial Institutions, and Ministry of Social Affairs.

== International cooperation ==
QFIU also partners with FIUs in the region and worldwide. It is an active member of the Egmont Group, an “informal network” of international FIUs organized “to foster international cooperation and information exchange” among its 139 members. QFIU serves as co-chair of the Asia Group within Egmont, along with FIU-India. In order to promote cooperation and information sharing with international and regional FIU’s and provide professional development to its staff, QFIU is a regular participant in Egmont and other FIU and Anti-Money Laundering conferences and forums.

In 2009, QFIU signed a Statement of Cooperation with the Japan Financial Intelligence Center to expand financial intelligence sharing by “facilitating the exchange of information in assisting investigations concerning money laundering, terrorist financing and related crimes.”

== Effectiveness ==
A 2008 report produced by the Middle East and North African Financial Action Task Force and conducted by IMF officials raised several shortcomings in QFIU’s creation and operations. According to the report, “The main shortcoming is that the administrative order establishing the FIU and empowering it with a number of functions appears to be inconsistent with the provisions of the AML Law that gave such powers to the coordinator of NAMLC.” It also noted that “the quality of STR [Suspicious Transaction Reports] needs improving,” that information was not adequately protected, and that there was periodic review of its effectiveness in combatting terrorism finance and money laundering.

QFIU addressed these issues directly in its 2009 Annual Report, declaring, “The FIU attached high importance to amending Law No. (28) of 2008 on Anti-Money Laundering and its amendments, following the mutual evaluation report of the International Monetary Fund in 2007, which revealed many deficiencies and weaknesses in the legislative regulations related to anti-money laundering and terrorism financing.” To improve its operations, QFIU developed an eight-point, five-year strategic plan, which commenced in 2013.

Although Qatar has enacted several pieces of legislation to address gaps and inconsistencies in its anti-money laundering and terrorism finance laws in recent years, the country has been criticized for not fully implementing or enforcing these measures. Former US Treasury Department official Matthew Levitt has noted, “To date, implementation and enforcement have not been a component of Qatar’s approach to these issues. Instead, Qatar routinely stresses to investors and critics alike the passage of laws that, on paper, appear robust but are almost never implemented or enforced.” In March 2022, during the Fourth Level High Strategic Dialogue between the state of Qatar & the United Nations office of counter terrorism (UNOCT), strategic priorities and collaborations for effective United Nations support to member’s states on Counter terrorism were discussed by both bodies. Qatar is the second largest contributor to the United Nations trust funds for counter terrorism out of a total 35 donors. This was all reported in the article by The United Nations on 27th March 2022. Also it was revealed in the article by US Department of state that there were no terrorist attacks reported in Qatar in 2019.

In its 2013 Annual Report, QFIU reported record numbers of Suspicious Transaction Reports (313) and suspects (352), though these numbers may reflect better adoption of anti-money laundering and terrorism finance measures as opposed to an increase in suspicious activities. Only 112 cases were disseminated to judicial or law enforcement authorities. According to a 2014 U.S. State Department report, Qatar prosecuted only one money-laundering case in 2013, and had no convictions. The same report lists Qatar as a “Major Money Laundering Country” and a “country of concern.”

An Anti-Money Laundering and Terrorism Financing (AML/CFT) Section was established under the Companies Affairs Department at MOCI pursuant in Qatar to Decision No. (95) of 2019. The Section’s responsibilities included coordination with the National Anti-Money Laundering and Terrorism Financing Committee (NAMLC). Providing NAMLC with any relevant data and information, collaboration with NAMLC to complete the National Risk Assessment of risks of money laundering, terrorism financing and financing of proliferation of weapons of mass destruction and implement its outcomes. On March 31, 2023, FATF published its report on Qatar’s recent initiatives for anti-money laundering and claimed that Qatar has made substantive improvements to its system to combat money laundering and terrorism financing and its technical compliance with FATF requirements is strong. The report also stated that the country is effectively confiscating large sums, including proceeds and instrumentalities of crime, and property of equivalent value. Qatar has implemented a risk-based approach to the assessment of money laundering and terrorist financing risks and the supervision of the financial sector.

QFIU reported even larger numbers of Suspicious Transaction Reports (516) and suspects (787) in 2014, though the number of cases disseminated to national or foreign law enforcement agencies declined markedly.
