= Estonian Financial Supervisory Authority =

Government agency of Estonia

- Finantsinspektsioon

Agency overview
- Formed: January 1, 2002
- Jurisdiction: Estonia
- Headquarters: Tallinn, Estonia
- Agency executive: Kilvar Kessler, Chairman
- Website: https://www.fi.ee/en

Finantsinspektsioon (Estonian Financial Supervision and Resolution Authority) is a financial supervision and crisis resolution authority with autonomous responsibilities and budget that works on behalf of the state of Estonia and is independent in its decision-making.

Finantsinspektsioon carries out state supervision over banks, insurance companies, insurance intermediaries, investment firms, fund managers, investment and pension funds, payment institutions, e-money institutions, creditors and credit intermediaries, and the securities market that all operate under activity licences granted by Finantsinspektsioon.

Under European Union policy frameworks, Finantsinspektsioon is the national competent authority for Estonia within European Banking Supervision. It is a voting member of the respective Boards of Supervisors of the European Banking Authority (EBA), European Insurance and Occupational Pensions Authority (EIOPA), and European Securities and Markets Authority (ESMA). It is Estonia's designated National Resolution Authority and plenary session member of the Single Resolution Board (SRB). It provides the permanent single common representative for Estonia in the Supervisory composition of the General Board of the Anti-Money Laundering Authority (AMLA). It is also a member of the European Systemic Risk Board (ESRB).

== See also ==
- Economy of Estonia
- Bank of Estonia
- Government of Estonia
- List of financial supervisory authorities by country
