= Fiji Financial Intelligence Unit =

Government agency in Fiji

The Fiji Financial Intelligence Unit (FIU) is a Fijian government agency established in 2006 under the Financial Transaction Reporting Act of 2004. It is tasked with the collection and analysis of financial information and intelligence.
