= Isabel Schnabel =

German economist

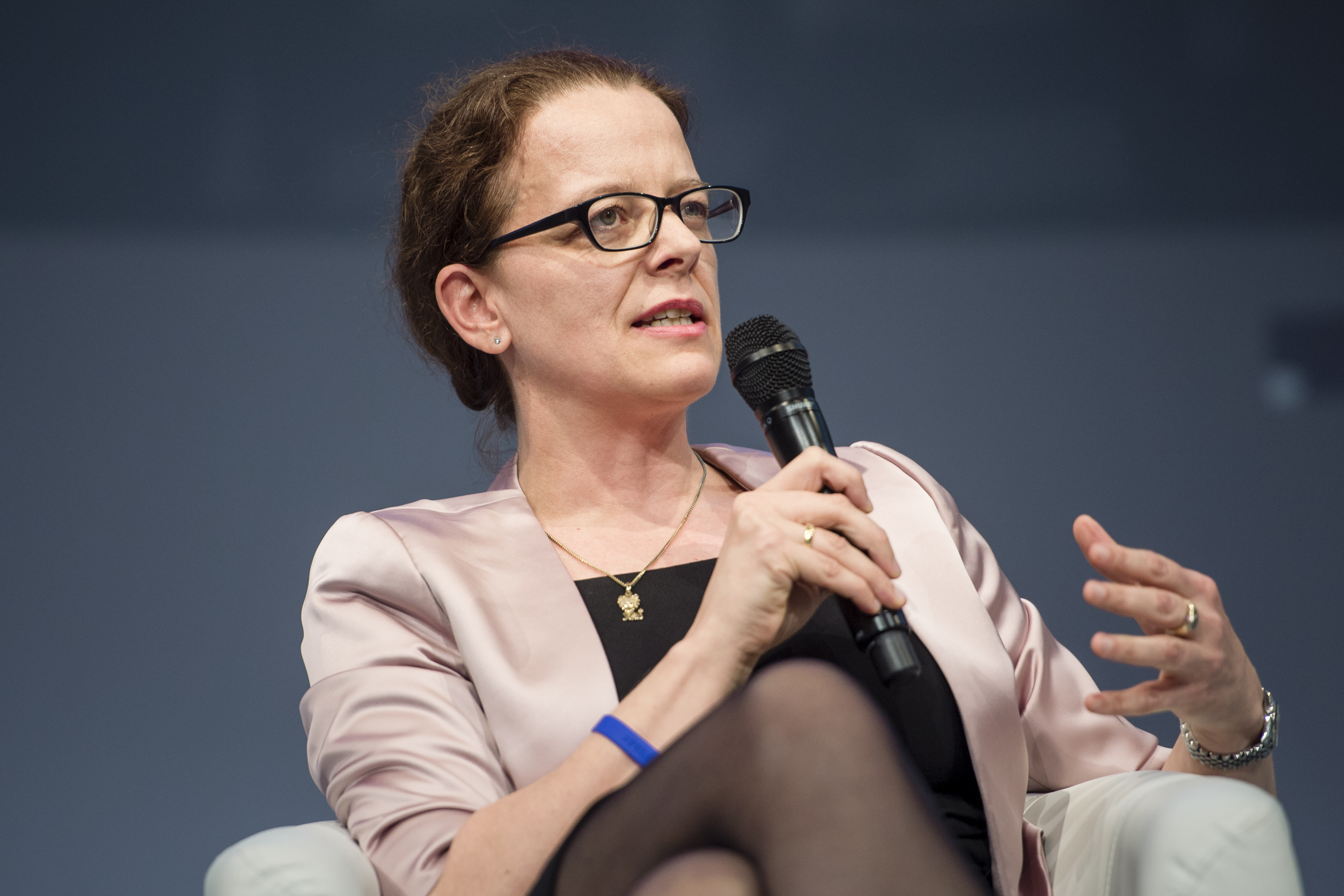
- Schnabel in 2017

Member of the Executive Board of the European Central Bank
- In office 1 January 2020 – 3 January 2027
- Preceded by: Sabine Lautenschläger

Personal details
- Born: Isabel Gödde; 9 August 1971 (age 55) Dortmund, West Germany (now Germany)
- Education: University of Mannheim; Paris 1 Panthéon-Sorbonne University; University of California, Berkeley

Isabel Schnabel (née Gödde, born 9 August 1971) is a German economist who has been serving as a member of the Executive Board of the European Central Bank since 2020, a position she will leave in January 2027 in order to join the International Monetary Fund.

She became professor of financial economics at the University of Bonn in 2015 and a member of the German Council of Economic Experts. She worked previously at the University of Mainz from 2007 to 2015.

== Early life and education ==
Schnabel was born in Dortmund. After completing her training as a bank clerk at Deutsche Bank in Dortmund, she began her studies in economics at the University of Mannheim in 1992. She continued her study of economics at the Paris I (Sorbonne) and the University of California, Berkeley before earning her diploma from the University of Mannheim in November 1998 as best in class. Schnabel studied as a doctoral student in economics at the University of Mannheim from 1998 to 2003, where she graduated summa cum laude after writing her dissertation titled “Macroeconomic Risks and Financial Crises – A Historical Perspective.”

== Career ==
=== Career in academia ===
After receiving her diploma in 1998, Schnabel started her doctorate studies in the graduate program "Allocation on financial markets" at the Department of Economics, University of Mannheim until 2003. That same year, she also wrote a dissertation, Macroeconomic Risks and Financial Crises – A Historical Perspective, under the supervision of Martin Hellwig. Following that, she then worked as a student research assistant to Axel Börsch-Supan while she completed internships at Deutsche Bank in Saint Petersburg and Frankfurt. For the next three years, she was a senior research fellow at the Max Planck Institute for Research on Collective Goods, Bonn.

In 2007 Schnabel became a professor of financial economics at Johannes Gutenberg University Mainz. In 2014 she was appointed as member of the German Council of Economic Experts (Sachverständigenrat zur Begutachtung der gesamtwirtschaftlichen Entwicklung) and started teaching financial economics at the University of Bonn in 2015.

In early 2019, she strongly advised against a possible merger of Deutsche Bank and Commerzbank.

=== Member of the executive board of the ECB, 2019–present ===
Following a proposal of Finance Minister Olaf Scholz, the German government nominated Schnabel to the European Central Bank’s executive board in October 2019, replacing Sabine Lautenschläger. Shortly after, the Eurogroup supported Schnabel's candidacy for a non-renewable 8-year term.

On the executive board, Schnabel is responsible for market operations. In this capacity, she oversees the ECB's 5.6 trillion-euro ($6.8 trillion) quantitative easing program.

On 24 September 2026, the ECB announced Schnabel's resignation, effective on 3rd January 2027. Schnabel leaves the ECB in order to join the IMF and succeed Tobias Adrian as Financial Counsellor and Director of the Monetary and Capital Markets Department of the IMF..

== Other activities ==
=== Regulatory agencies ===
- Deutsche Bundesbank, member of the scientific advisory board of the Research Data and Service Centre (RDSC) (since 2016)
- European Systemic Risk Board (ESRB), member of the advisory scientific committee (since 2015)
- Federal Financial Supervisory Authority (BaFin), chairman of the advisory board (member since 2008) and member of the administrative council (since 2013)

=== Research organizations ===
- Verein für Socialpolitik, member of the executive board (since 2015)
- Center for European Economic Research (ZEW), member of the scientific advisory board (since 2012)
- European Historical Economics Society, member of the board of trustees (2005–2009)

=== Editorial boards ===
- Review of Economics, member of the board of associate editors (since 2012)
- Financial History Review, member of the editorial advisory board (since 2009)
- Economics of Transition, co-editor (2008–2014)

== Recognition ==
- 2019 – North Rhine-Westphalian Academy of Sciences, Humanities and the Arts, Member
- 2018 – Berlin-Brandenburg Academy of Sciences and Humanities, Member
- 2018 – Gustav Stolper Prize

== Selected publications ==
- Schäfer, Alexander; ———; Weder di Mauro, Beatrice (2016). "Financial Sector Reform after the Subprime Crisis: Has Anything Happened?". Review of Finance. 20 (1): 77–125. doi:10.1093/rof/rfu055. hdl:10.1093/rof/rfu055.
- Gropp, Reint; Hakenes, Hendrik; ——— (2011). "Competition, Risk-shifting, and Public Bail-out Policies". Rev. Financ. Stud. 24 (6): 2084–2120. doi:10.1093/rfs/hhq114. hdl:11858/00-001M-0000-0028-6E46-2.
- Dell'Ariccia, Giovanni; ———; Zettelmeyer, Jeromin (2006). "How Do Official Bailouts Affect the Risk of Investing in Emerging Markets?". Journal of Money, Credit and Banking. 38 (7): 1689–1714. doi:10.1353/mcb.2006.0091. JSTOR 3838962. S2CID 17061634.
- ——— (2004). "The German Twin Crisis of 1931". Journal of Economic History. 64 (3): 822–871. doi:10.1017/S0022050704002980. S2CID 154503072.
- ———; Shin, Hyun Song (2004). "Liquidity and Contagion: The Crisis of 1763". Journal of the European Economic Association. 2 (6): 929–968. doi:10.1162/1542476042813887.

Government offices
Preceded by Sabine Lautenschläger	Member of the Executive Board of the European Central Bank; 2020–present	Incumbent
