= SEPBLAC =

Spanish Financial Intelligence Unit

Executive Service
- Servicio Ejecutivo
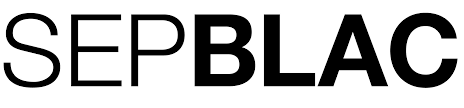
- Logotype

Agency overview
- Formed: November 7, 1980; 45 years ago
- Preceding agency: Executive Service of the Commission for Surveillance of Exchange Control Infractions
- Jurisdiction: Kingdom of Spain
- Headquarters: Madrid, Spain
- Annual budget: €21.8 million (2023)
- Agency executive: Pedro Manuel Comín Rodríguez, Director
- Parent department: Ministry of Economy
- Parent agency: Commission for the Prevention of Money Laundering and Monetary Offenses
- Website: www.sepblac.es

The Executive Service of the Commission for the Prevention of Money Laundering and Monetary Offenses (Spanish: Servicio Ejecutivo de la Comisión de Prevención del Blanqueo de Capitales e Infracciones Monetarias, SEPBLAC) is the financial intelligence unit (FIU) of the Spanish Ministry of Economy. As FIU, the Sepblac is the supervisory authority for the prevention of money laundering and the financing of terrorism and the execution of sanctions and financial countermeasures of the 2010 Prevention of Money Laundering and the Financing of Terrorism Act. Since 30 October 2020, the director of the Executive Service is Pedro Manuel Comín Rodríguez.

Under the European Union policy framework, SEPBLAC provides the permanent single common representative for Spain in both the Supervisory composition and the FIU composition of the General Board of the Anti-Money Laundering Authority (AMLA).

== Overview ==
SEPBLAC's main task is to fight against money laundering and the financing of terrorism and cooperating with the Financial Action Task Force (FATF) of which Spain has been a member since 1990.

Attached to SEPBLAC are the Central Financial Intelligence Brigade of the National Police Corps, the Investigation Unit of the Civil Guard and a financial intelligence unit of the Agencia Tributaria.

== The Commission ==
The Executive Service reports to the Commission for the Prevention of Money Laundering and Monetary Offenses (integrated in the Secretariat of State for Economy and Business Support), a collective body composed by representatives of the Ministry of Economy, the Ministry of Industry, the Ministry of Justice, the Ministry of Foreign Affairs, the Ministry of the Interior, the National Intelligence Centre, the Prosecution Ministry, the General Council of the Judiciary, the Bank of Spain, the Spanish Data Protection Agency, the Spanish Tax Agency and of the different law enforcement agencies.
