= Qatar National Company for Medical Projects =

Public Qatari company

The Qatar National Company for Medical Projects (شركة قطر الوطنية للمشاريع الطبية) is a public Qatari company established in 2005. According to the company’s statute, the Qatar National Company for Medical Projects’s main purpose is to contribute to Qatar’s healthcare system and economy by investing in the fields of healthcare and medical industry.

When the company was established by the Qatari Minister of Economy and Trade (decision n.63/2005), it started with 160 million riyals in capital.

== Financial information ==
The company is publicly traded on the Abu Dhabi Securities Exchange under the ticker symbol GMPC.

On July 3, 2015, the company announced that its net profit had increased by 20 percent for the first half of 2015, compared to the same period the previous year.

== Mission ==
The establishment of the company was publicly announced at the Intercontinental Hotel in Doha in March 2005. In his inaugural address, Sheikh Abdul Rahman bin Khalifa bin Abdul Aziz Al-Thani, Chairman of the Board of Directors, emphasized that the company aims to “be a pioneer in the field of the medical industry at the highest level” and to contribute to an inclusive healthcare system that benefits all segments of Qatari society.

The company intends to provide high-quality medical services, ranging from health insurance coverage to medical assistance, including support for medical research.

Article 3 of the Qatar National Company for Medical Projects’ charter defines the primary goal of the company as the establishment and management of hospitals and medical clinics, as well as diagnostic centers. The company also provides and manages infrastructural, medical, and pharmaceutical equipment and supplies. Moreover, according to the same article, the company engages with and supports other firms with analogous or subsidiary purposes in Qatar or abroad.

Under Article 4 of its statute, the company is committed to providing medical services in compliance with Islamic law.

== Board of directors ==
According to Article 28 of the company’s statute, the company is managed by a board of five elected members. The first board of directors was by the company’s founders:

- Sheikh Abdul Rahman bin Khalifa bin Abdul Aziz al-Thani, chairman of the board of directors;
- Sheikh Ahmed bin Eid bin Mohammed al-Thani, deputy chairman;
- Sheikh Mishaal bin Abdullah bin Jassim al-Thani, member;
- Mohammed Sultan Ali Abdullah al-Ali, member;
- Bader Abdul Rahim Yusuf, member.
