= Financial Crimes Investigation Board (Turkey) =

Financial intelligence agency in Turkey

The Financial Crimes Investigation Board (MASAK; in Turkish: Mali Suçlar Araştırma Kurulu) is a Turkish financial intelligence unit attached to the Ministry of Finance and Treasury. MASAK's main duties are to prevent money laundering crime, to conduct research on it, to develop measures, and to process the collected information and submit it to the necessary authorities.

== History ==
MASAK was established with the Law No. 4208 on the Prevention of Money Laundering, which entered into force on 19.11.1996, and started its activities on 17 February 1997. Its duties and powers were later rearranged by the Law No. 5549 on Prevention of Laundering Proceeds of Crime, which entered into force on 18.10.2006.
