= Danièle Nouy =

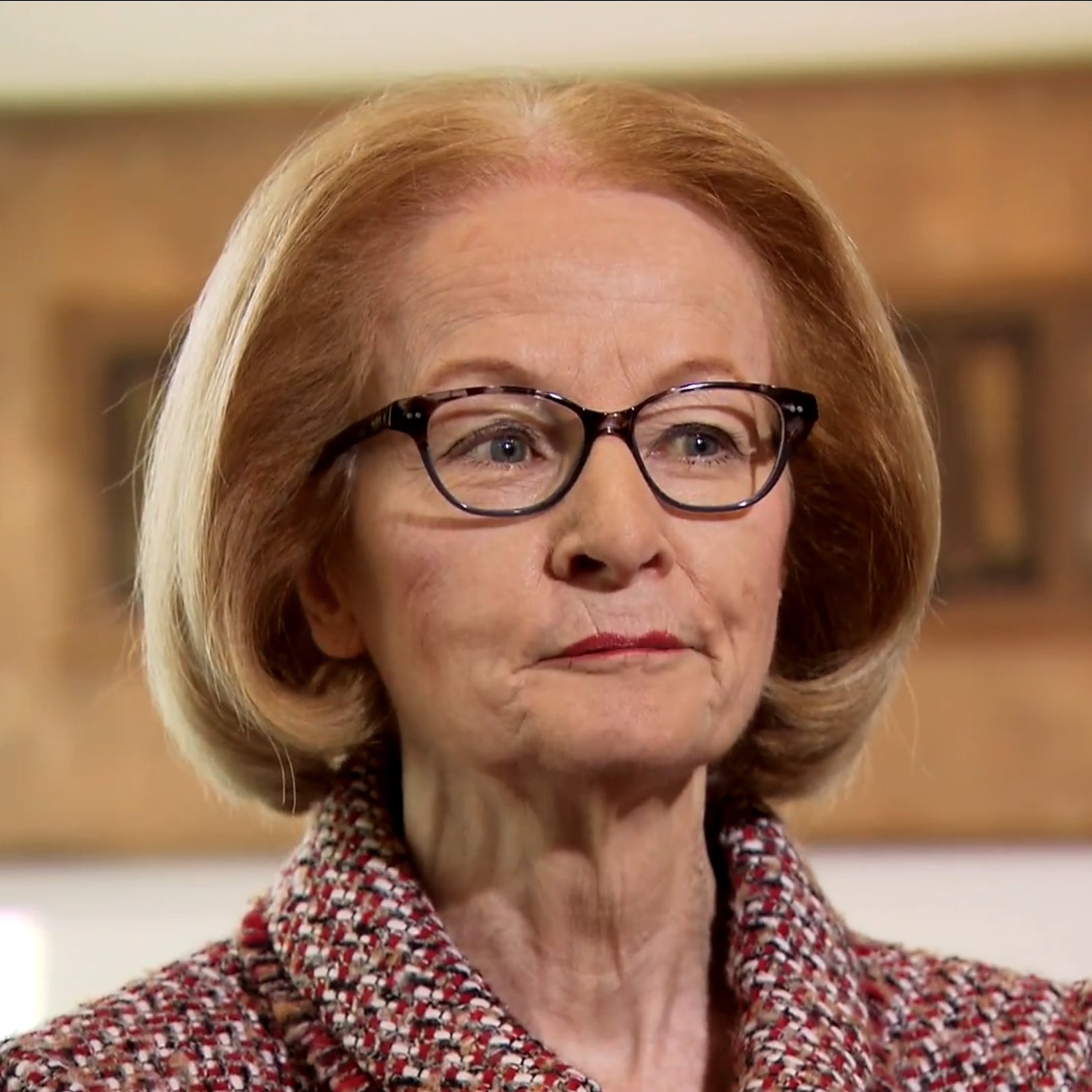
- Nouy in 2018

Chair of the ECB Supervisory Board
- In office 1 January 2014 – 1 January 2019
- Preceded by: Position established
- Succeeded by: Andrea Enria

Personal details
- Born: 30 July 1950 (age 76) Rennes, France
- Education: Sciences Po; Panthéon-Assas University

Danièle Nouy is a French public servant who served as Chair of the Supervisory Board at the European Central Bank from 1 January 2014 to 31 December 2018. She was regarded as the effective head of European Banking Supervision.

== Early life and education ==
Nouy grew up in Brittany. She studied political science at Sciences Po and holds a Bachelor's Degree in Law from Assas University. She came second at the nationwide Banque de France exam.

== Career ==
Nouy worked at Banque de France from 1976 to 1996. She later served as secretary general of the French Prudential Supervision and Resolution Authority from 9 March 2010 to 31 December 2013.

As head of the ECB Supervisory Board, Nouy later oversaw the implementation of European Banking Supervision. For her nomination, Mario Draghi, president of the European Central Bank, declared, “The appointment of the Supervisory Board Chair marks an important milestone as the ECB establishes a single supervisory mechanism for banks in the euro area. Mrs. Nouy brings almost 40 years of experience in banking supervision. Her appointment will allow the Supervisory Board to take up its work soon and put in place all organisational requirements to assume our supervisory responsibilities starting on 4 November 2014.”

== Other activities ==
- European Investment Bank (EIB), Member of the Appointment Advisory Committee
