= Council for Financial Activities Control =

National Financial Intelligence Unit of Brazil

- Conselho de Controle de Atividades Financeiras; COAF
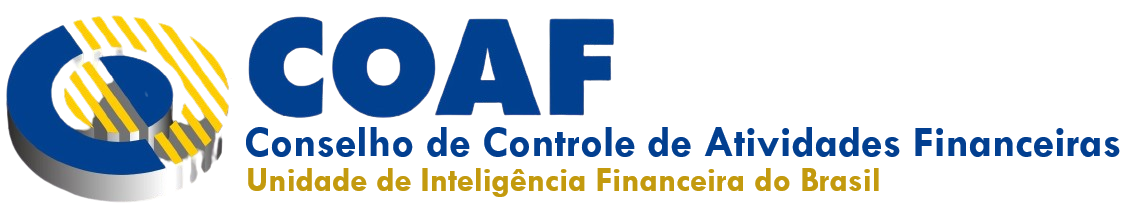

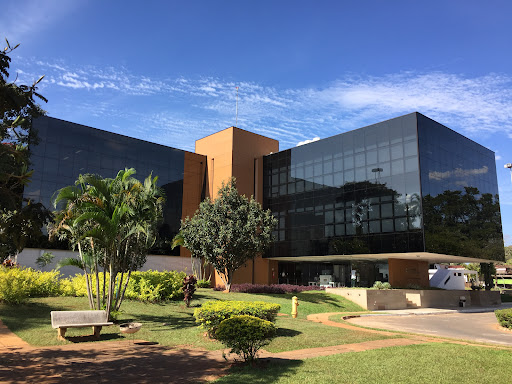

Administrative body overview
- Formed: March 3, 1998
- Jurisdiction: Brazil
- Headquarters: Brasília, Distrito Federal
- Parent administrative body: Central Bank of Brazil

The Council for Financial Activities Control (Portuguese: Conselho de Controle de Atividades Financeiras - COAF) is the national Financial Intelligence Unit of Brazil that is responsible for receiving and analyzing information on financial transactions which are considered to be linked to money laundering. The COAF disseminates the results of its analyses to the competent authorities where there are grounds to suspect money laundering or terrorist financing.

It was originally created in 1998 "under the jurisdiction of the Ministry of Finance, for the purpose of regulating, applying administrative sanctions, receiving pertinent information, examining and identifying suspicious occurrences of illicit activities related to money laundering." Its organization and structure, as well as its Internal Rules and Regulations, were also defined in a Decree and Administrative Rule respectively, both enacted between October and December 1998.

On 19 August 2019 the name of the COAF was changed to Financial Intelligence Unit (Unidade de Inteligência Financeira in Portuguese) by a provisional decree of the President Jair Bolsonaro, who transferred the newly created unit under the control of the Central Bank of Brazil. However, the National Congress of Brazil amended the text of the decree, sanctioned by Law No. 13,974 of 7 January 2020, and decided that the name of the Unit would remain Council for Financial Activities Control (COAF).

== See also ==
- Federal institutions of Brazil
