= Tracfin =

French financial intelligence agency

Tracfin (acronym for Traitement du renseignement et action contre les circuits financiers clandestins, "Intelligence Processing and Action Against Clandestine Financial Circuits") is a service of the French Ministry of Finance. It fights money laundering.

== Structure ==
Tracfin is a unit of the then French Ministry for Economy, Finance and Industry and the Ministry for the Budget, Public Accounts, the Civil Service and State Reform with a statewide reach. Since its foundation in 1990 its aim is to fight against illegal financial operations, money laundering and terrorism financing. It is now a financial intelligence service attached to the Ministry of the Economy, Finance and Industrial and Digital Sovereignty (Ministère de l’Économie, des Finances et de la Souveraineté industrielle et numérique) named Traitement du renseignement et action contre les circuits financiers clandestins (French financial Unit for Combating Money Laundering and the Financing of Terrorism). Tracfin works with various government bodies, such as the Central Office for Financial Crime (OCRGDF), the financial regulator (ACPR), the markets authority (AMF), and tax authorities (DGFiP), as well as local governments. It can also request information from any entity covered by AML laws. If it finds signs of criminal activity, Tracfin can report the case to the justice system under Article 40 of the French Code of Criminal Procedure.

Its mission is to collect, analyze and exploit financial intelligence with a triple focus:

- the fight against economic and financial crime;
- the fight against public finance fraud;
- the defence of the fundamental interests of the nation, notably in the fight against the financing of terrorism and criminal interference.

== See also ==
- Government of France
- List of intelligence agencies of France
