= European Central Bank =

Supranational central bank in Europe

European Central Bank (in other official languages): Bulgarian / Европейска централна банка; Czech / Evropská centrální banka; Danish / Den Europæiske Centralbank; German / Europäische Zentralbank; Greek / Ευρωπαϊκή Κεντρική Τράπεζα; Spanish / Banco Central Europeo; Estonian / Euroopa Keskpank; Finnish / Euroopan keskuspankki; French / Banque centrale européenne; Irish / An Banc Ceannais Eorpach; Croatian / Europska središnja banka; Hungarian / Európai Központi Bank; Italian / Banca centrale europea; Lithuanian / Europos Centrinis Bankas; Latvian / Eiropas Centrālā banka; Maltese / Bank Ċentrali Ewropew; Dutch / Europese Centrale Bank; Polish / Europejski Bank Centralny; Portuguese / Banco Central Europeu; Romanian / Banca Centrală Europeană; Slovak / Európska centrálna banka; Slovene / Evropska centralna banka; Swedish / Europeiska centralbanken

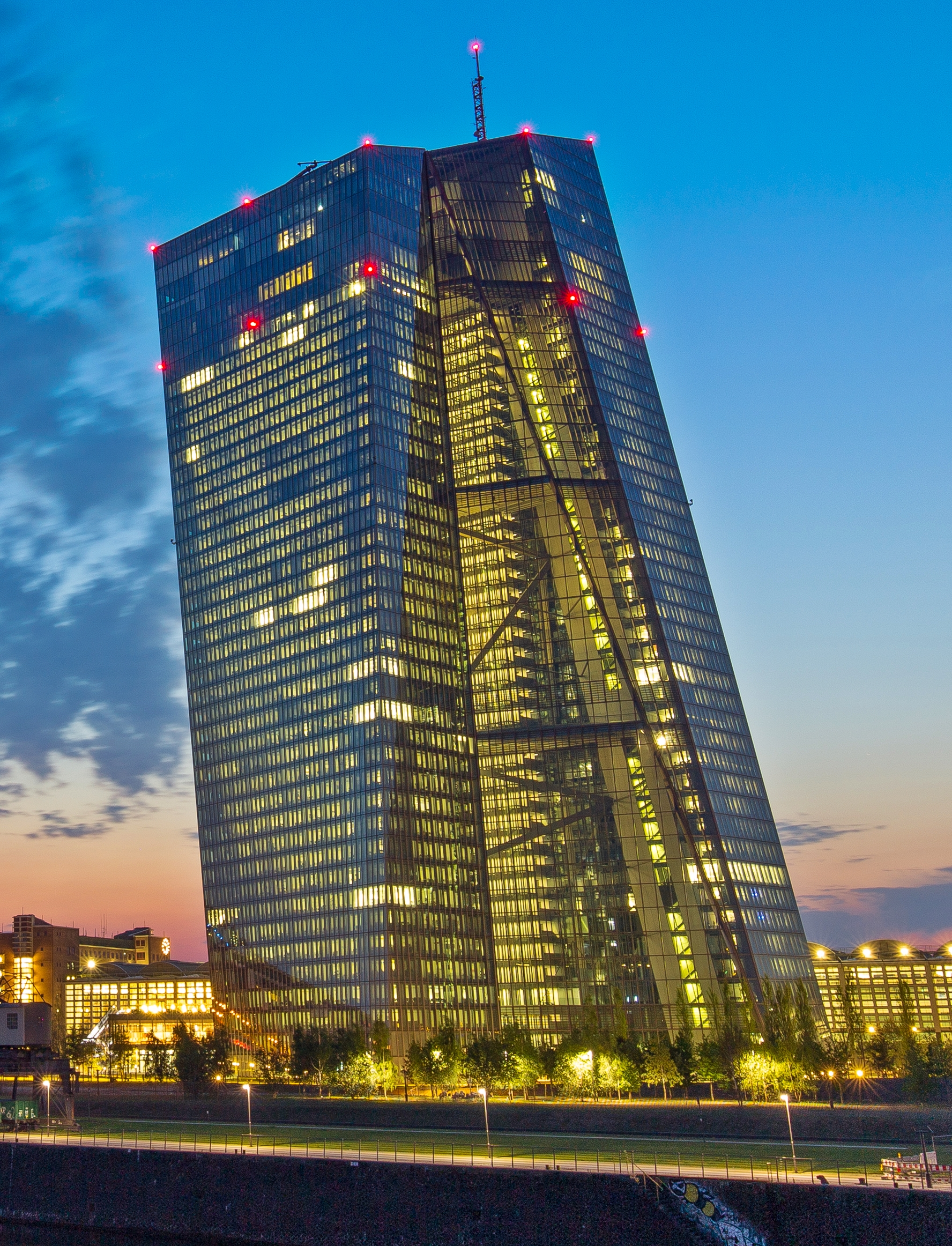
- Seat in Frankfurt
- Headquarters: Ostend district, Frankfurt, Germany
- Coordinates: 50°06′32″N 8°42′12″E
- Established: 1 June 1998 (28 years ago)
- Governing body: Governing Council; Executive Board
- Key people: Christine Lagarde (president); Boris Vujčić (vice president); Philip R. Lane (chief economist)
- Currency: Euro (€); EUR (ISO 4217)
- Reserves: €526 billion: €40 billion (directly); €340 billion (Eurosystem incl. gold); €150 billion (forex reserves)
- Bank rate: 2.15% (main refinancing operations); 2.40% (marginal lending facility)
- Interest on reserves: 2.00% (deposit facility)
- Preceded by: 21 central banks: Oesterreichische Nationalbank; National Bank of Belgium; Bulgarian National Bank; Croatian National Bank; Central Bank of Cyprus; Bank of Estonia; Bank of Finland; Banque de France; Deutsche Bundesbank; Bank of Greece; Central Bank of Ireland; Banca d'Italia; Latvijas Banka; Bank of Lithuania; Central Bank of Luxembourg; Central Bank of Malta; De Nederlandsche Bank; Banco de Portugal; Banka Slovenije; Národná banka Slovenska; Banco de España
- Website: ecb.europa.eu

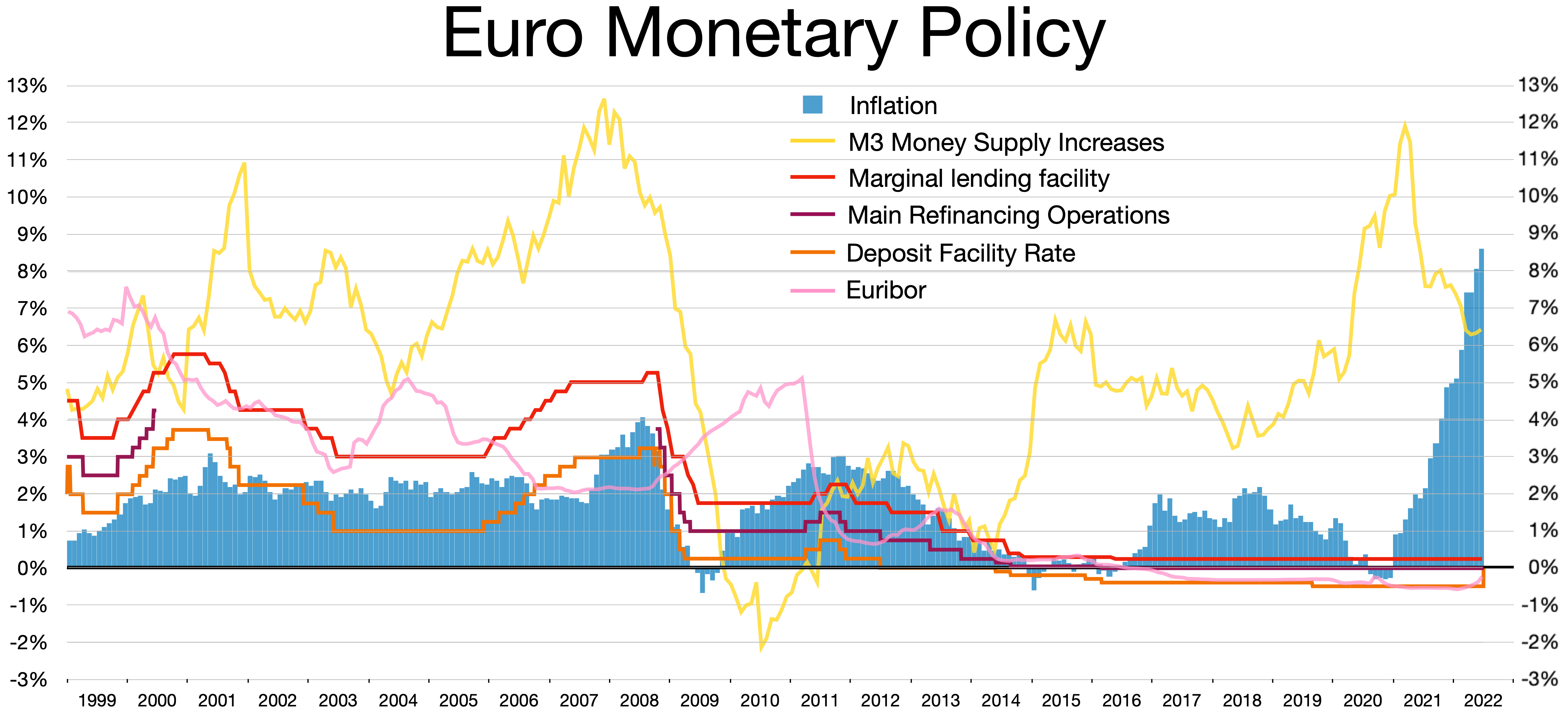
Euro monetary policy Euro zone inflation year/year M3 money supply increases Marginal Lending Facility Main Refinancing Operations Deposit Facility Rate Euribor

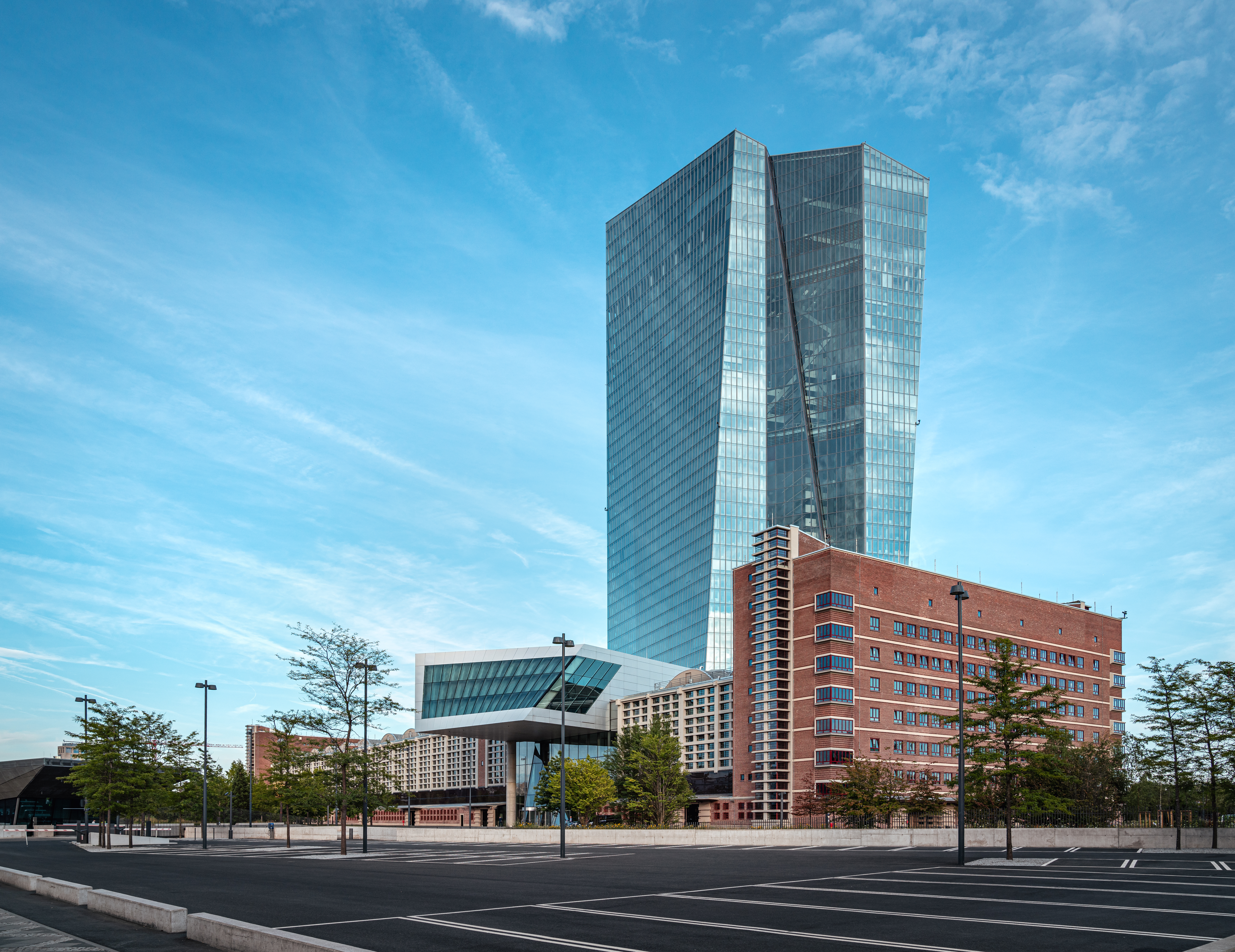
Seat of the European Central Bank

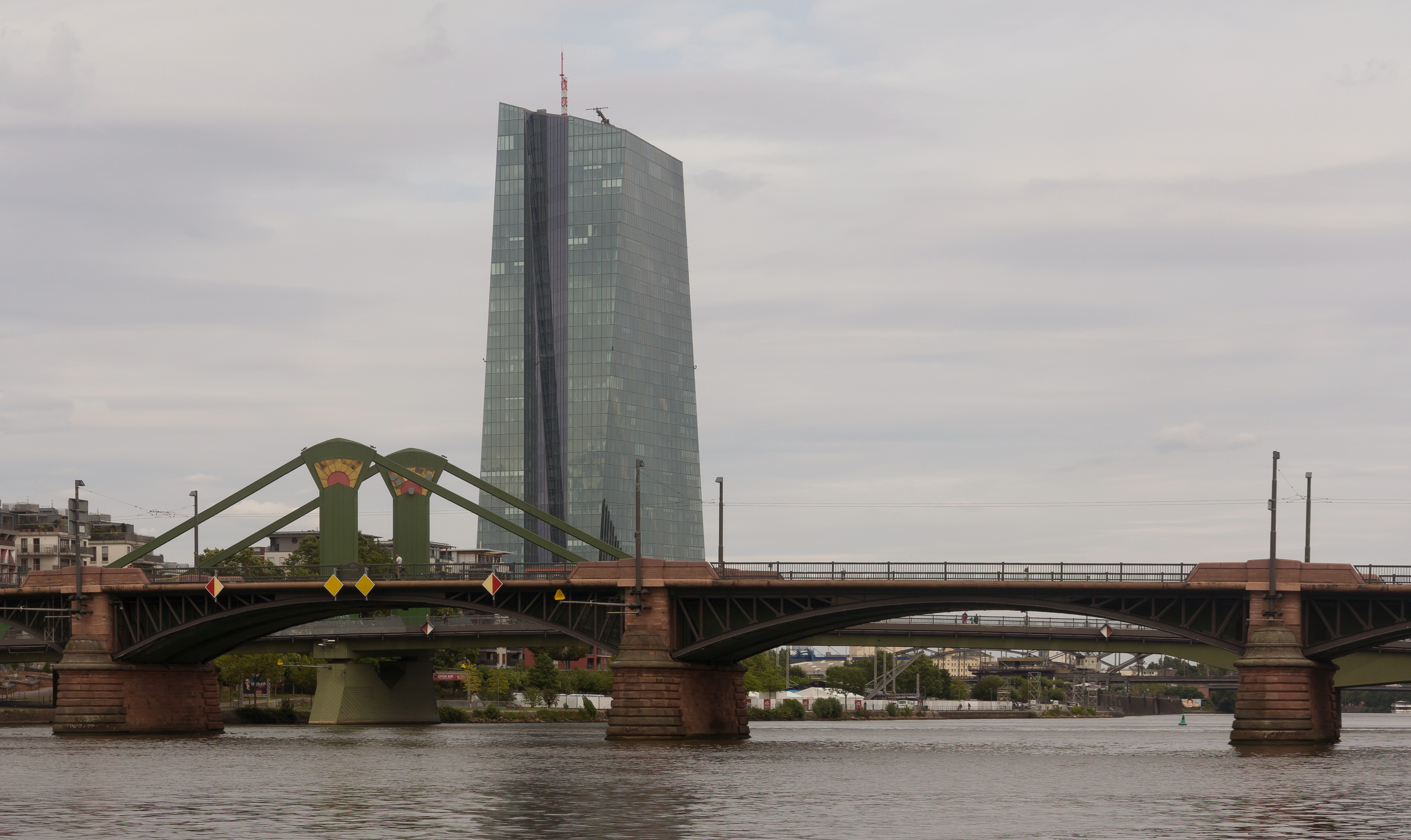
Frankfurt am Main, the European Central Bank from Alte Mainbrücke

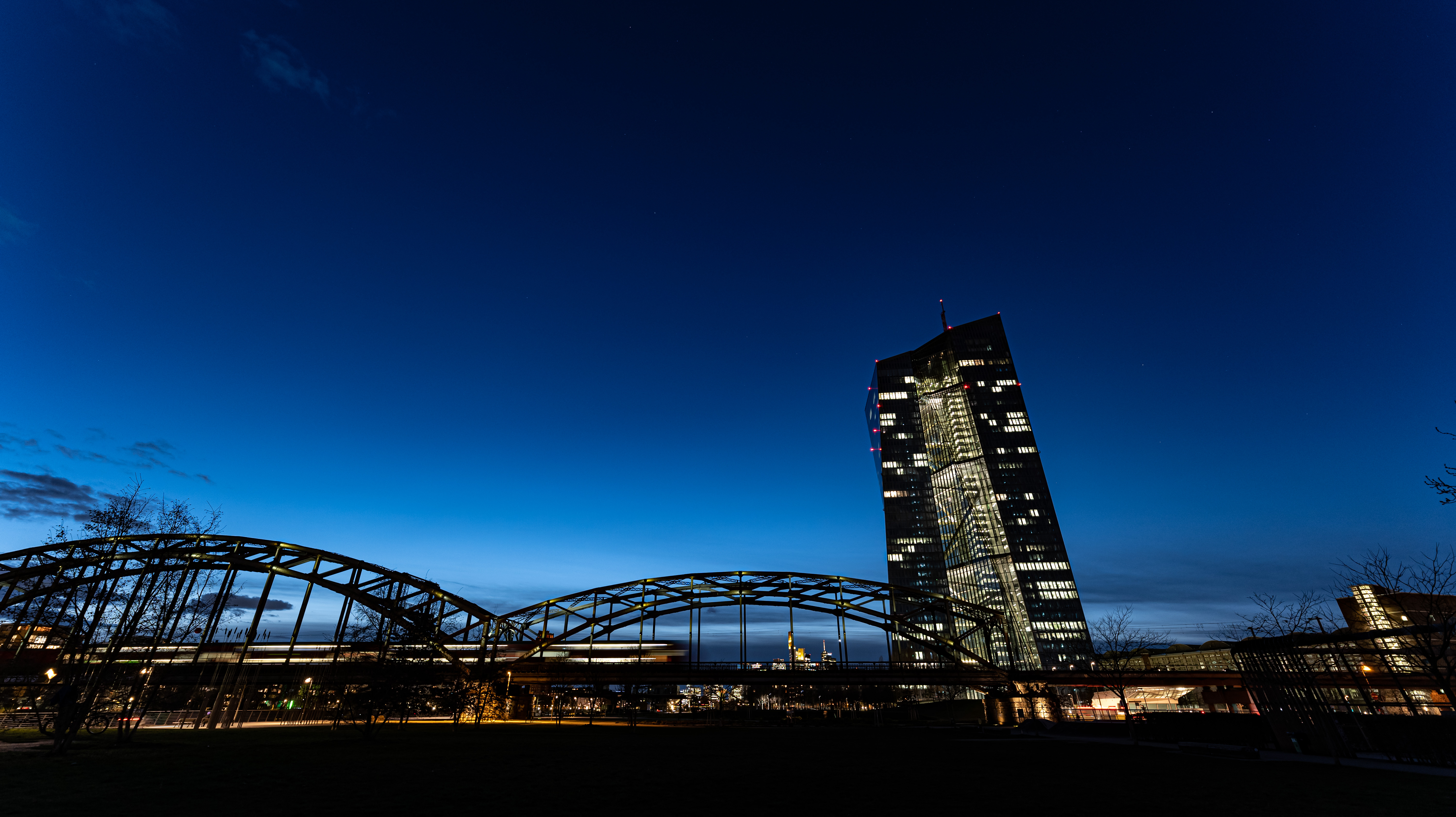
European Central Bank – Blue hour 2023

The European Central Bank (ECB) is the central component of the Eurosystem and the European System of Central Banks (ESCB) as well as one of seven institutions of the European Union. It is one of the world's most important central banks, heading a system with a combined balance sheet of close to €7 trillion.

The ECB Governing Council makes monetary policy for the Eurozone and the European Union, administers the foreign exchange reserves of EU member states, engages in foreign exchange operations, and defines the intermediate monetary objectives and key interest rate of the EU. The ECB Executive Board enforces the policies and decisions of the Governing Council, and may direct the national central banks when doing so. The ECB has the exclusive right to authorise the issuance of euro banknotes. Member states can issue euro coins, but the volume must be approved by the ECB beforehand. The bank also operates the T2 payments system.

The ECB was established by the Treaty of Amsterdam in May 1999 with the purpose of guaranteeing and maintaining price stability. On 1 December 2009, the Treaty of Lisbon became effective and the bank gained the official status of an EU institution. When the ECB was created, it covered a Eurozone of eleven members. Since then, Greece joined in January 2001, Slovenia in January 2007, Cyprus and Malta in January 2008, Slovakia in January 2009, Estonia in January 2011, Latvia in January 2014, Lithuania in January 2015, Croatia in January 2023, and Bulgaria in January 2026. The current president of the ECB is Christine Lagarde. Seated in Frankfurt, Germany, the bank formerly occupied the Eurotower prior to the construction of its new seat.

The ECB is directly governed by European Union law. Its capital stock, worth €11 billion, is owned by all 27 central banks of the EU member states as shareholders. The initial capital allocation key was determined in 1998 on the basis of the states' population and GDP, but the capital key has been readjusted since. Shares in the ECB are not transferable and cannot be used as collateral.

== History ==
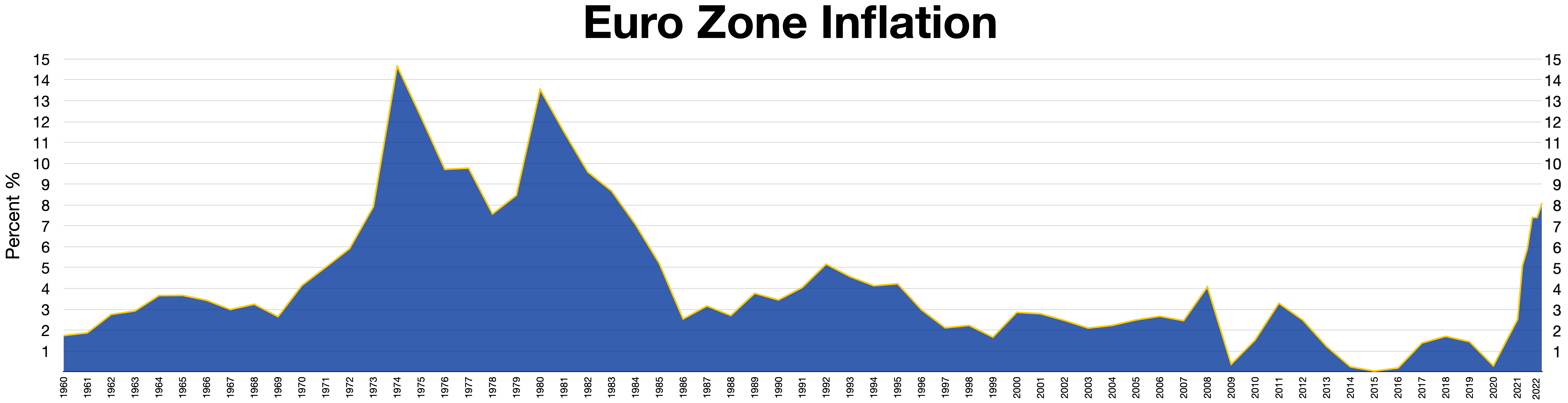
Euro zone inflation

=== Early years (1998–2007) ===
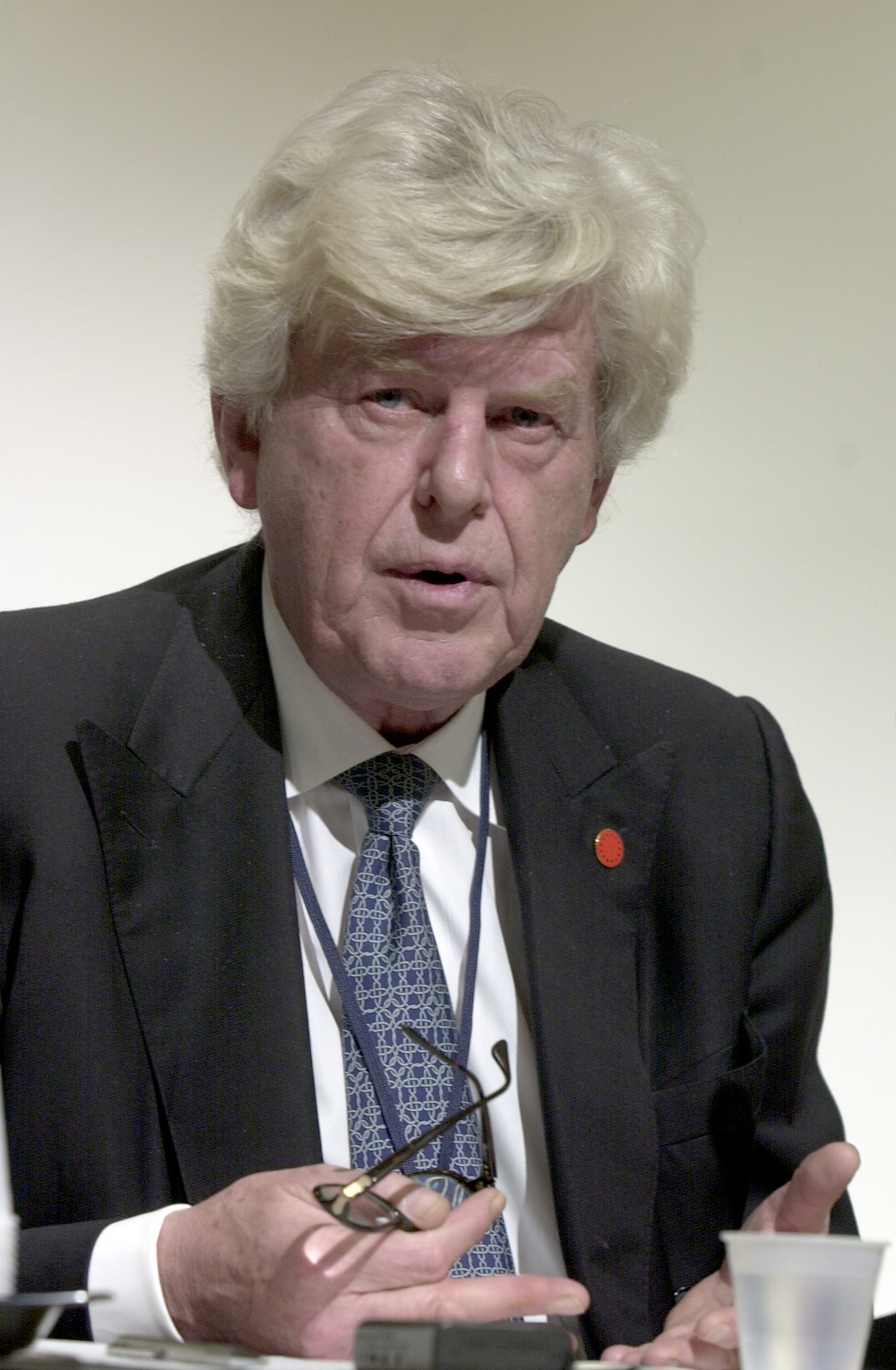
Wim Duisenberg, first President of the ECB

The European Central Bank is the de facto successor of the European Monetary Institute (EMI). The EMI was established at the start of the second stage of the EU's Economic and Monetary Union (EMU) to handle the transitional issues of states adopting the euro and prepare for the creation of the ECB and European System of Central Banks (ESCB). The EMI itself took over from the earlier European Monetary Cooperation Fund (EMCF).

The ECB formally replaced the EMI on 1 June 1998 by virtue of the Treaty on European Union (TEU, Treaty of Maastricht), however it did not exercise its full powers until the introduction of the euro on 1 January 1999, signalling the third stage of EMU. The bank was the final institution needed for EMU, as outlined by the EMU reports of Pierre Werner and President Jacques Delors. It was established on 1 June 1998 The first President of the Bank was Wim Duisenberg, the former president of the Dutch central bank and the European Monetary Institute. While Duisenberg had been the head of the EMI (taking over from Alexandre Lamfalussy of Belgium) just before the ECB came into existence, the French government wanted Jean-Claude Trichet, former head of the French central bank, to be the ECB's first president. The French argued that since the ECB was to be located in Germany, its president should be French. This was opposed by the German, Dutch and Belgian governments who saw Duisenberg as a guarantor of a strong euro. Tensions were abated by a gentleman's agreement in which Duisenberg would stand down before the end of his mandate, to be replaced by Trichet.

Trichet replaced Duisenberg as president in November 2003. Until 2007, the ECB had very successfully managed to maintain inflation close but below 2%.

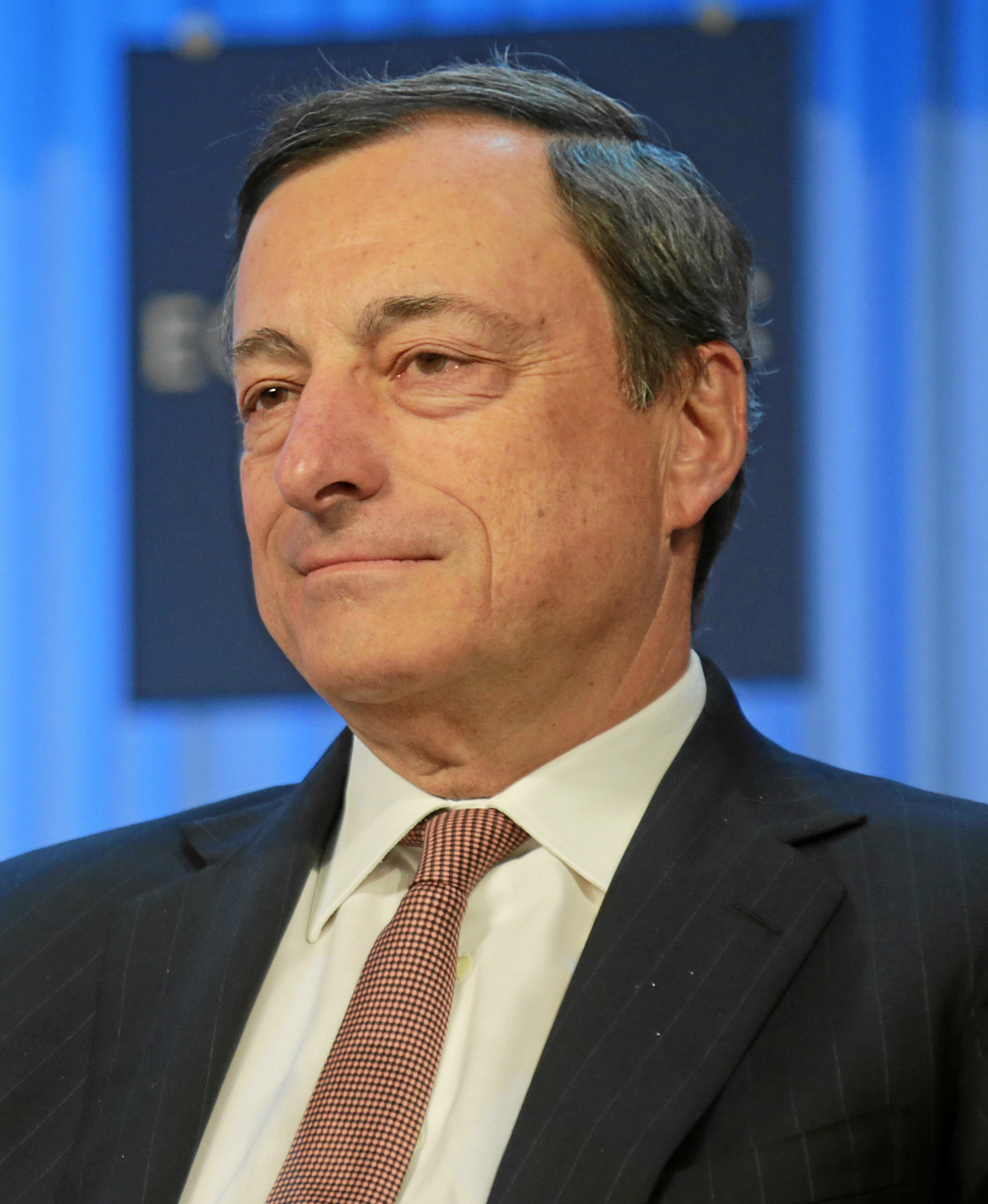
Mario Draghi, President of the ECB between 2011 and 2019

=== Response to the financial crises (2008–2014) ===
The European Central Bank underwent through a deep internal transformation as it faced the 2008 financial crisis and the Euro area crisis.

==== Early response to the Euro area crisis ====
The Euro area crisis began after Greece's new elected government uncovered the real level of indebtedness and budget deficit and warned EU institutions of the imminent danger of a Greek sovereign default.

Foreseeing a possible sovereign default in the eurozone, the general public, international and European institutions, and the financial community reassessed the economic situation and creditworthiness of some Eurozone member states. Consequently, sovereign bonds yields of several Eurozone countries started to rise sharply. This provoked a self-fulfilling panic on financial markets: the more Greek bonds yields rose, the more likely a default became possible, the more bond yields increased in turn.

This panic was also aggravated because of the reluctance of the ECB to react and intervene on sovereign bond markets for two reasons. First, because the ECB's legal framework normally forbids the purchase of sovereign bonds in the primary market (Article 123. TFEU), An over-interpretation of this limitation inhibited the ECB from implementing quantitative easing like the Federal Reserve and the Bank of England did as soon as 2008, which played an important role in stabilizing markets.

Secondly, a decision by the ECB made in 2005 introduced a minimum credit rating (BBB−) for all Eurozone sovereign bonds to be eligible as collateral to the ECB's open market operations. This meant that if private rating agencies were to downgrade a sovereign bond below that threshold, many banks would suddenly become illiquid because they would lose access to ECB refinancing operations. According to former member of the governing council of the ECB Athanasios Orphanides, this change in the ECB's collateral framework "planted the seed" of the euro crisis.

Faced with those regulatory constraints, the ECB led by Jean-Claude Trichet in 2010 was reluctant to intervene to calm down financial markets. Up until 6 May 2010, Trichet formally denied at several press conferences the possibility of the ECB to embark into sovereign bonds purchases, even though Greece, Ireland, Portugal, Spain and Italy faced waves of credit rating downgrades and increasing interest rate spreads.

==== Market interventions (2010–2011) ====
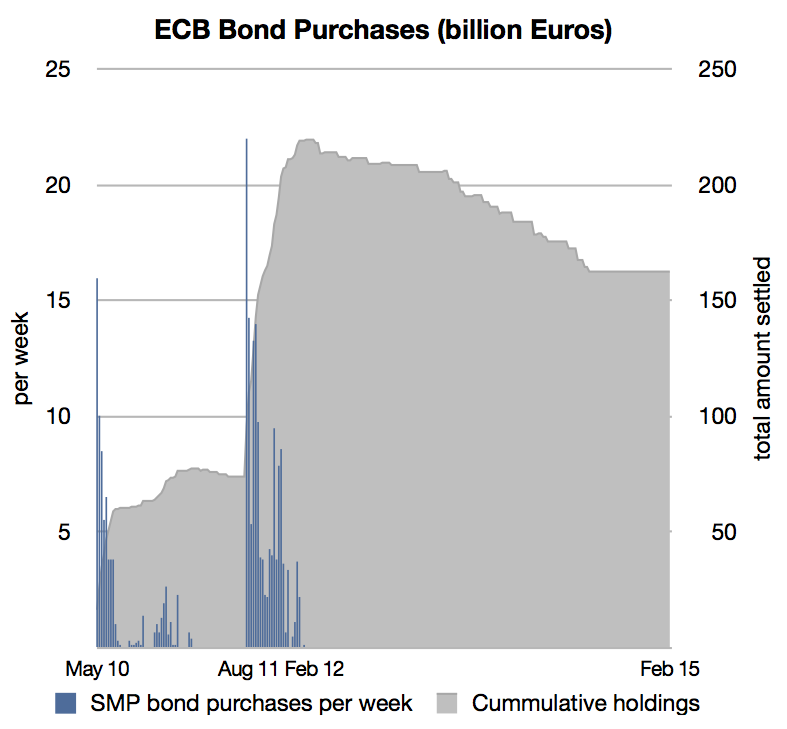
ECB Securities Markets Programme (SMP) covering bond purchases since May 2010

In a remarkable U-turn, the ECB announced on 10 May 2010 the launch of a "Securities Market Programme" (SMP) which involved the discretionary purchase of sovereign bonds in secondary markets. Extraordinarily, the decision was taken by the Governing Council during a teleconference call only three days after the ECB's usual meeting of 6 May (when Trichet still denied the possibility of purchasing sovereign bonds). The ECB justified this decision by the necessity to "address severe tensions in financial markets". The decision also coincided with the EU leaders' decision of 10 May to establish the European Financial Stabilisation mechanism, which would serve as a crisis fighting fund to safeguard the euro area from a future sovereign debt crisis.

Although at first limited to the debt of Greece, Ireland and Portugal, the bulk of the ECB's bond buying eventually consisted of Spanish and Italian debt. These purchases were intended to dampen international speculation against stressed countries, and thus avoid a contagion of the Greek crisis towards other Eurozone countries. The assumption—largely justified—was that speculative activity would decrease over time and the value of the assets increase.

Although SMP purchases did inject liquidity into financial markets, all of these injections were "sterilized" through weekly liquidity absorption. So the operation was net neutral in liquidity terms (though this was of little practical importance since normal monetary policy operations were ensuring unlimited supplies of liquidity at the main policy interest rate).

In September 2011, Jürgen Stark resigned as an ECB Board member in protest against the "Securities Market Programme" which involved the purchase of sovereign bonds from Southern member states, a move that he considered as equivalent to monetary financing, which is prohibited by the EU Treaty. The Financial Times Deutschland referred to this episode as "the end of the ECB as we know it", referring to its hitherto perceived "hawkish" stance on inflation and its historical Deutsche Bundesbank influence.

As of 18 June 2012, the ECB had spent €212.1 bn in total (equal to 2.2% of the Eurozone GDP) for bond purchases covering outright debt, as part of the Securities Markets Programme. Controversially, the ECB made substantial profits out of SMP, which were largely redistributed to Eurozone countries. In 2013, the Eurogroup decided to refund those profits to Greece; however, the payments were suspended from 2014 until 2017 over the conflict between Yanis Varoufakis and ministers of the Eurogroup. In 2018, profits refunds were reinstalled by the Eurogroup. However, several NGOs complained that a substantial part of the ECB profits would never be refunded to Greece.

==== Role in the Troika (2010–2015) ====
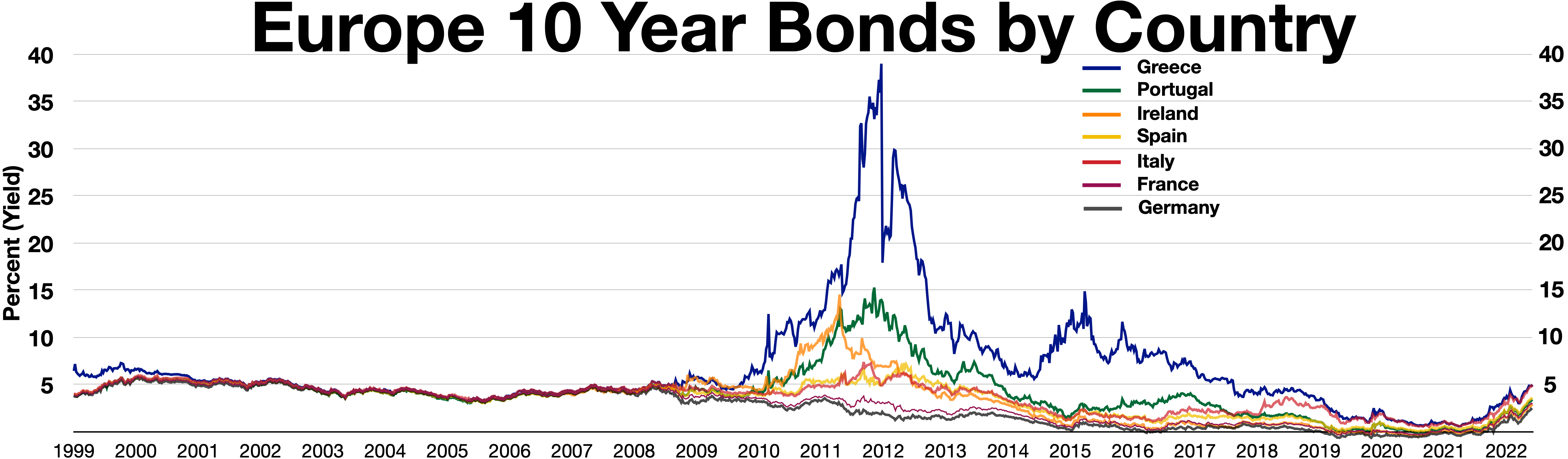
European 10 year bonds, before the Great Recession in Europe bonds floated together in parity Greece 10 year bond Portugal 10 year bond Ireland 10 year bond Spain 10 year bond Italy 10 year bond France 10 year bond Germany 10 year bond

The ECB played a controversial role in the "Troika" by rejecting most forms of debt restructuring of public and bank debts, and pressing governments to adopt bailout programmes and structural reforms through secret letters to Italian, Spanish, Greek and Irish governments. It has further been accused of interfering in the Greek referendum of July 2015 by constraining liquidity to Greek commercial banks.

In November 2010, reflecting the huge increase in borrowing, including the cover the cost of having guaranteed the liabilities of banks, the cost of borrowing in the private financial markets had become prohibitive for the Irish government. Although it had deferred the cash cost of recapitalising the failing Anglo Irish Bank by nationalising it and issuing it with a "promissory note" (an IOU), the Government also faced a large deficit on its non-banking activities, and it therefore turned to the official sector for a loan to bridge the shortfall until its finances were credibly back on a sustainable footing. Meanwhile, Anglo used the promissory note as collateral for its emergency loan (ELA) from the Central Bank. This enabled Anglo to repay its depositors and bondholders.

It became clear later that the ECB played a key role in making sure the Irish government did not let Anglo default on its debts, to avoid financial instability risks. On 15 October and 6 November 2010, the ECB President Jean-Claude Trichet sent two secret letters to the Irish finance Minister which essentially informed the Irish government of the possible suspension of ELA's credit lines, unless the government requested a financial assistance programme to the Eurogroup under the condition of further reforms and fiscal consolidation.

In addition, the ECB insisted that no debt restructuring (or bail-in) should be applied to the nationalized banks' bondholders, a measure which could have saved Ireland 8 billion euros.

During 2012, the ECB pressed for an early end to the ELA, and this situation was resolved with the liquidation of the successor institution IBRC in February 2013. The promissory note was exchanged for much longer term marketable floating rate notes which were disposed of by the Central Bank over the following decade.

In April 2011, the ECB raised interest rates for the first time since 2008 from 1% to 1.25%, with a further increase to 1.50% in July 2011. However, in 2012–2013 the ECB sharply lowered interest rates to encourage economic growth, reaching the historically low 0.25% in November 2013. Soon after the rates were cut to 0.15%, then on 4 September 2014 the central bank reduced the rates by two-thirds from 0.15% to 0.05%. Recently, the interest rates were further reduced reaching 0.00%, the lowest rates on record.

In a report adopted on 13 March 2014, the European Parliament criticized the "potential conflict of interest between the current role of the ECB in the Troika as 'technical advisor' and its position as a creditor of the four Member States, as well as its mandate under the Treaty". The report was led by Austrian right-wing MEP Othmar Karas and French Socialist MEP Liem Hoang Ngoc.

==== Response under Mario Draghi (2012–2015) ====
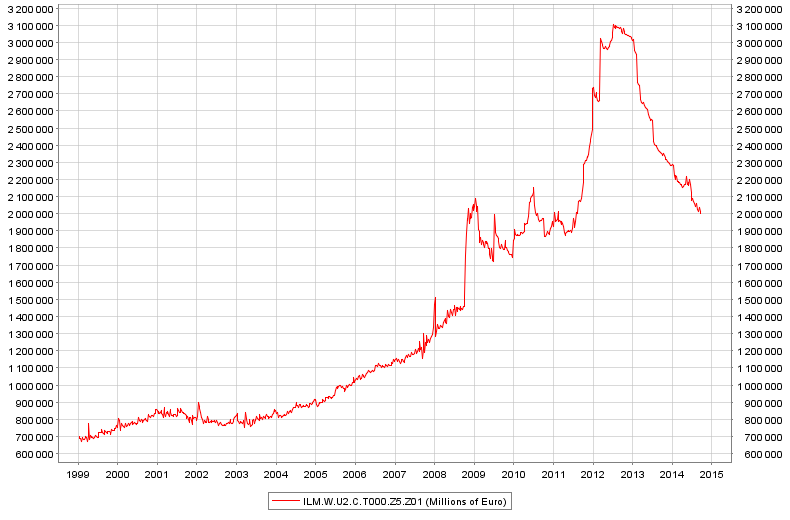
ECB balance sheet

ECB deposit facility

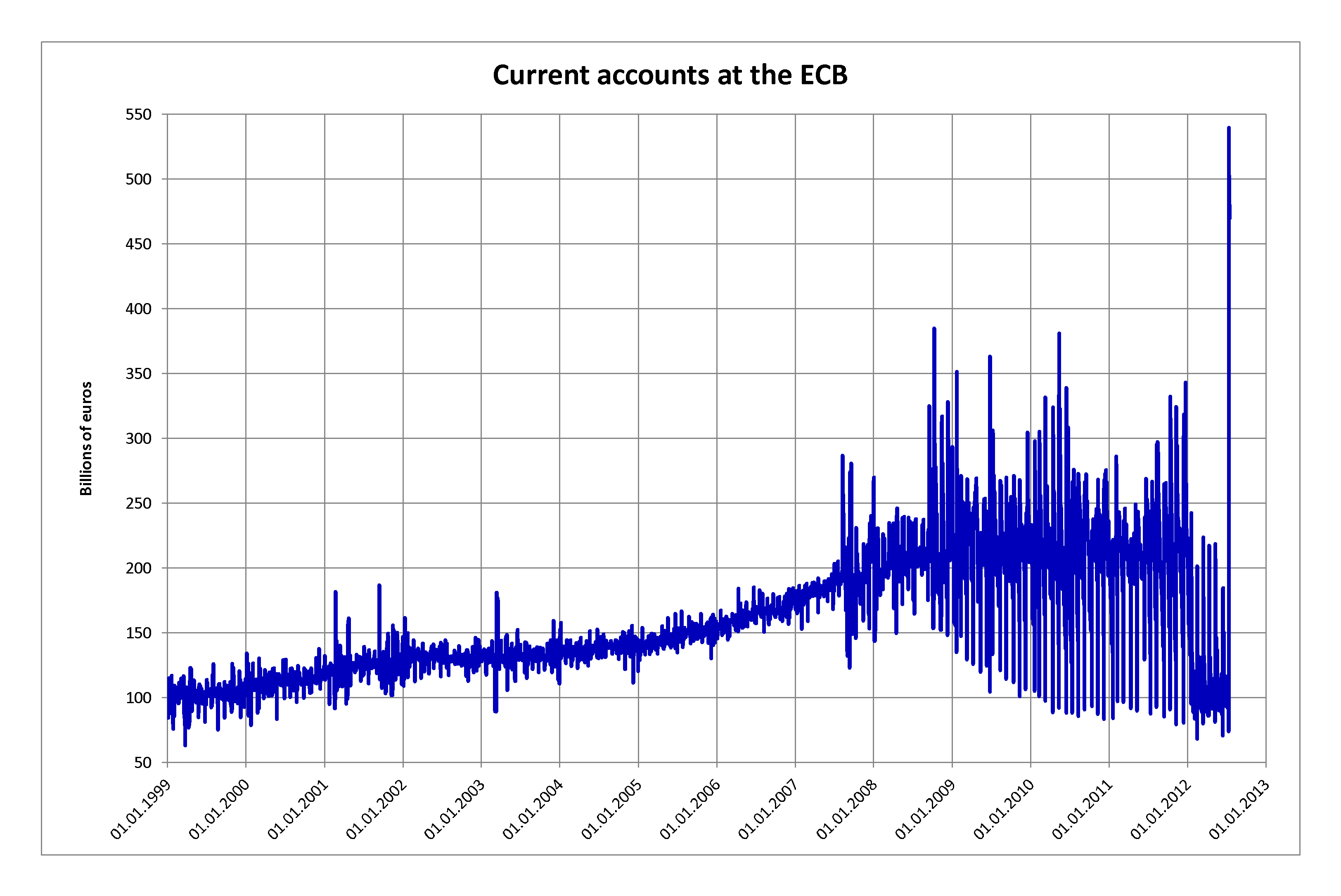
Current accounts at the ECB

On 1 November 2011, Mario Draghi replaced Jean-Claude Trichet as President of the ECB. This change in leadership also marks the start of a new era under which the ECB will become more and more interventionist and eventually ended the Euro area crisis.

Draghi's presidency started with the impressive launch of a new round of 1% interest loans with a term of three years (36 months) – the Long-term Refinancing operations (LTRO). Under this programme, 523 Banks tapped as much as €489.2 bn (US$640 bn). Observers were surprised by the volume of loans made when it was implemented. By far biggest amount of €325bn was tapped by banks in Greece, Ireland, Italy and Spain. Although those LTROs loans did not directly benefit EU governments, it effectively allowed banks to do a carry trade, by lending off the LTROs loans to governments with an interest margin. The operation also facilitated the rollover of €200bn of maturing bank debts in the first three months of 2012.

===== "Whatever it takes" (26 July 2012) =====
Facing renewed fears about sovereigns in the eurozone Mario Draghi made a decisive speech in London, by declaring that the ECB "...is ready to do whatever it takes to preserve the Euro. And believe me, it will be enough." In light of slow political progress on solving the eurozone crisis, Draghi's statement has been seen as a key turning point in the eurozone crisis, as it was immediately welcomed by European leaders, and led to a steady decline in bond yields for eurozone countries, in particular Spain, Italy and France.

Following up on Draghi's speech, on 6 September 2012 the ECB announced the Outright Monetary Transactions programme (OMT). Unlike the previous SMP programme, OMT has no ex-ante time or size limit. However, the activation of the purchases remains conditioned to the adherence by the benefitting country to an adjustment programme to the ESM. The program was adopted with near unanimity, the Bundesbank president Jens Weidmann being the sole member of the ECB's Governing Council to vote against it.

Even if OMT was never actually implemented until today, it made the "Whatever it takes" pledge credible and significantly contributed to stabilizing financial markets and ending the sovereign debt crisis. According to various sources, the OMT programme and "whatever it takes" speeches were made possible because EU leaders previously agreed to build the banking union.

=== Low inflation and quantitative easing (2015–2019) ===
In November 2014, the bank moved into its new premises, while the Eurotower building was dedicated to hosting the newly established supervisory activities of the ECB under European Banking Supervision.

Although the Euro area crisis was almost solved by 2014, the ECB started to face a repeated decline in the Eurozone inflation rate, indicating that the economy was going towards a deflation. Responding to this threat, the ECB announced on 4 September 2014 the launch of two bond buying purchases programmes: the Covered Bond Purchasing Programme (CBPP3) and Asset-Backed Securities Programme (ABSPP).

==== Asset Purchase programme (APP) ====
On 22 January 2015, the ECB announced an extension of those programmes within a full-fledge "quantitative easing" programme which also included sovereign bonds, to the tune of 60 billion euros per month up until at least September 2016. The programme was started on 9 March 2015.

On 8 June 2016, the ECB added corporate bonds to its asset purchases portfolio with the launch of the corporate sector purchase programme (CSPP). Under this programme, it conducted the net purchase of corporate bonds until January 2019 to reach about €177 billion. While the programme was halted for 11 months in January 2019, the ECB restarted net purchases in November 2019.

On 5 May 2020, the Court ordered the Bundestag and the Bundesregierung to ensure the ECB had carried out a proportionality assessment of the vast purchases of government debt in the Public Sector Purchase Programme (PSPP) to ensure the economic and fiscal policy effects do not outweigh its policy objectives. The PSPP-implementing decision has been considered an act ultra vires by the ECB as it was too arbitrary and lacks reasoning in ints proportionality assessment. This ruling by the German Constitutional Court comes at a difficult time for the ECB as it was at the time considering expanding the PEPP. The ruling also reflects the mistrust within some parts of Germany in the ECB, which is seen there as an institution that bails out profligate Southern European countries. Moreover, this ruling also highlights the vital problem on the euro area architecture, as the range of instruments can use to fulfil its mandate remains unclear.

As of 2021, the size of the ECB's quantitative easing programme had reached 2947 billion euros.

==== Long Term Refinancing Operations (LTRO) ====
The long term refinancing operations (LTRO) are regular open market operations providing financing to credit institutions for periods up to four years. They aim at favoring lending conditions to the private sector and more generally stimulating bank lending to the real economy, thereby fostering growth.

In December 2011 and January 2012, in the aftermath of the 2008 financial crisis, the ECB implemented two LTROs, injecting over €1000 billion of liquidity in the Eurozone financial system. They were later criticized for their inability to revive growth and to help truly revive the real economy, despite having stabilized the Eurozone's financial institutions. Further, these operations were devoid of monitoring from the ECB regarding the use made of these liquidities and it appeared that banks had significantly used these funds to pursue carry-trade strategies, purchasing sovereign bonds with higher rates and corresponding maturity to generate profits, instead of increasing private lending.

These critics and deficiencies brought the ECB to instigate targeted long term refinancing operations (TLTROs), first in September and later in December 2014. These complementary programs imposed conditionality on the LTROs. The TLTROs provided low cost financing to participating banks, under the condition that they reached certain targets in terms of lending to firms and households. The participating banks were thus more incited to lend to the real economy.

A third wave of TLTRO's was announced on 7 March 2019, namely the TLTRO III. Under TLTRO III, the interest rate was set at −0.5% below the deposit facility rate (DFR), under condition that banks reached a specific lending performance threshold. The TLTRO III programme was successful to stimulate credit growth.

=== Christine Lagarde's era (2019 – ) ===
In July 2019, EU leaders nominated Christine Lagarde to replace Mario Draghi as ECB President. Lagarde resigned from her position as managing director of the International Monetary Fund in July 2019 and formally took over the ECB's presidency on 1 November 2019.

Lagarde immediately signalled a change of style in the ECB's leadership. She embarked the ECB on a strategic review of the ECB's monetary policy strategy, an exercise the ECB had not done for 17 years. As part of this exercise, Lagarde committed the ECB to look into how monetary policy could contribute to address climate change, and promised that "no stone would be left unturned." The ECB president also adopted a change of communication style, in particular in her use of social media to promote gender equality, and by opening dialogue with civil society stakeholders.

==== The ECB's response to COVID-19 pandemic ====
The onset of the COVID-19 pandemic precipitated an unprecedented crisis, profoundly impacting global public health, economies, and societal structures on an unparalleled scale. The crisis led to renewed tensions in European sovereign bonds markets, marked by a growing spreads between the interest rates paid by Eurozone member states, which spurred concerns about the Euro area crisis.

On 12 March 2020, the ECB announced a set of policy measures such as an additional package of net asset purchases of €120 billion by the end of 2020 under the already existing APP, and more favorable terms on the TLTRO III. During the press conference, Christine Lagarde declared that the ECB "[...] is not here to close spreads." This particular statement triggered a sudden negative reaction on financial markets, with a widening of yield spreads in Spain, Italy and Greece.

===== Pandemic Emergency Purchase Programme (PEPP) =====
On 19 March 2020—less than one week after Lagarde's unfortunate statements on the spreads—the ECB made a surprise announcement about the launch of the Pandemic Emergency Purchase Programme (PEPP) worth €750 billion to boost liquidity in the European economy and to contain any sharp increases in sovereign yield spreads. This announcement led to an immediate reboot in stock prices and came one day after the spike in sovereign risk spreads.

The PEPP was designed as a typical "quantitative easing" policy, under which the ECB could flexibly purchase securities from the private and public sectors. The purpose of the PEPP was to stabilize sovereign bonds yields at low and stable levels, thus preventing self-fulfilling panics in financial markets such as occurred during the Euro area crisis.

The PEPP was established as a separate purchase programme alongside the pre-existing Asset Purchase Programme (APP) with the sole purpose to respond to the economic and financial consequences of the COVID-19 crisis, and in particular to prevent market fragmentations. While very similar, in contrast to the APP, the ECB decided to allow itself to deviate from the capital key. This temporary flexibility meant that the ECB could more effectively prevent the rise of Italian and Spanish yield spreads.

Assets meeting the eligibility criteria of the APP were also eligible under the PEPP. However, the pool of assets eligible under the PEPP was broader than the usual ECB collateral eligibility framework. For instance, the ECB could purchase Greek sovereign bonds, despite having credit ratings below the usual investment grade requirement. This waiver was given based on several considerations from the ECB: there was a need to alleviate the pressures stemming from the pandemic on the Greek financial markets; Greece was already and would be closely monitored by giving the waiver; and Greece regained market access. Non-financial commercial paper with a remaining maturity of at least 28 days was also eligible for purchase under the PEPP.

On 4 June 2020, the ECB announced that it would expand the PEPP by another €600 billion, as it became clear that the pandemic would continue to harm European economies. Half a year later, on 10 December 2020, the ECB announced its final expansion of the PEPP worth another €500 billion, making the final total PEPP €1.850 trillion, corresponding to 15.4% of the euro-area GDP of 2019.

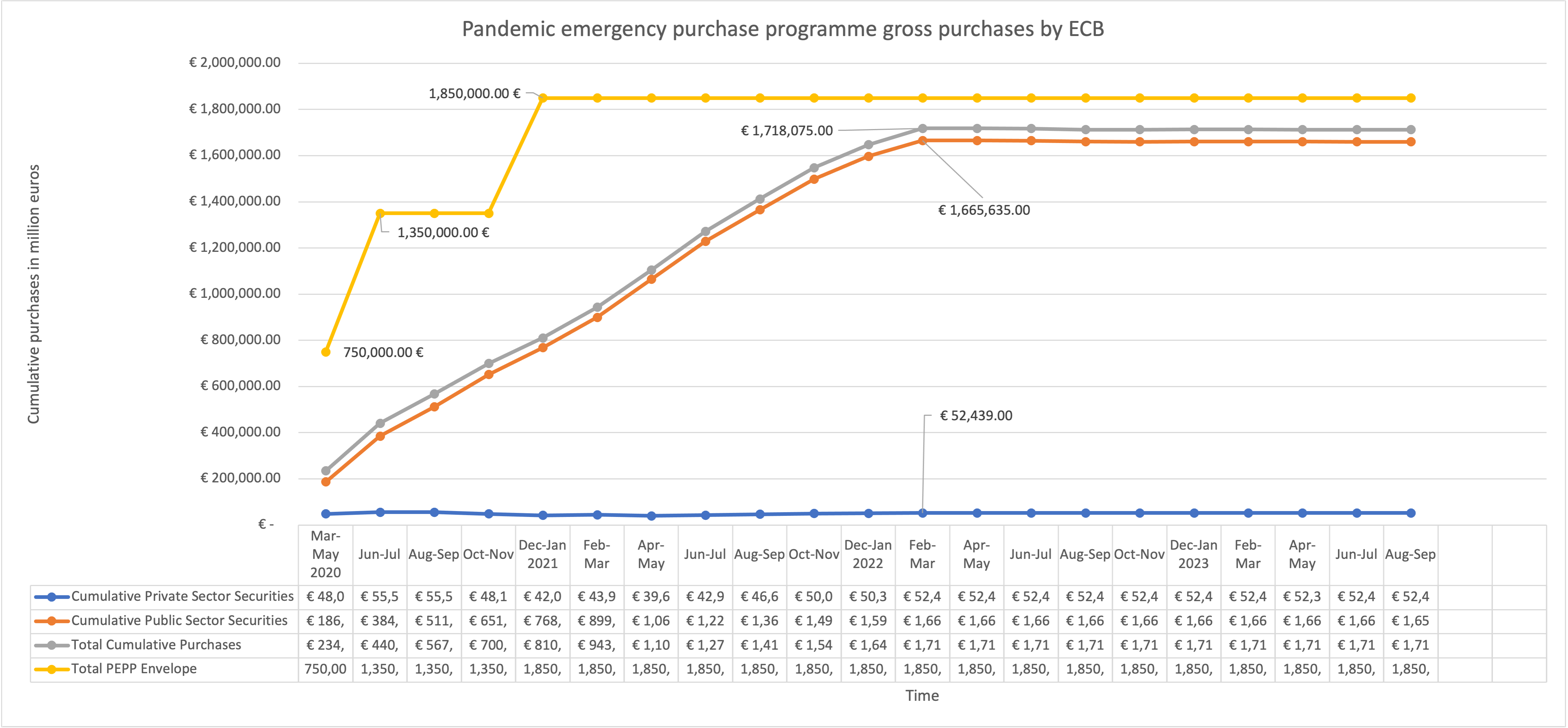
Gross securities purchases by the ECB under the PEPP

In December 2021, the ECB announced that it would discontinue net purchases under the PEPP as from the end of March 2022 and that it intended to reinvest the principal payments from maturing securities at least until the end of 2024.

On 31 March 2022, at the end of the net purchases, the accumulated total net purchases amounted to €1.718 billion, of which €1.665 billion was invested in public sector securities and €52 billion in private sector securities. Of the total €1.850 billion available under the PEPP, 93% of the full envelope wase used, due to indications of decreased financial stress in the Euro Area, mainly thanks to relaxation of COVID restrictions and the reopening of European markets.

Cumulative PEPP purchases in millions of euros
| Period | Securities | | | Commitment by ECB | |
| Period | Private sector | Public sector | Total | In period | Cumulative |
|---|---|---|---|---|---|
| Mar–May 2020 | 48,062 | 186,603 | 234,665 | 750,000 | 750,000 |
| Jun–Jul | 55,592 | 384,817 | 440,409 | 600,000 | 1,350,000 |
| Aug–Sep | 55,534 | 511,649 | 567,183 | – | 1,350,000 |
| Oct–Nov | 48,194 | 651,809 | 700,003 | – | 1,350,000 |
| Dec–Jan 2021 | 42,064 | 768,148 | 810,212 | 500,000 | 1,850,000 |
| Feb–Mar | 43,916 | 899,731 | 943,647 | – | 1,850,000 |
| Apr–May | 39,696 | 1,064,769 | 1,104,465 | – | 1,850,000 |
| Jun–Jul | 42,989 | 1,229,199 | 1,272,189 | – | 1,850,000 |
| Aug–Sep | 46,640 | 1,365,650 | 1,412,290 | – | 1,850,000 |
| Oct–Nov | 50,089 | 1,498,100 | 1,548,189 | – | 1,850,000 |
| Dec–Jan 2022 | 50,384 | 1,597,293 | 1,647,677 | – | 1,850,000 |
| Feb–Mar | 52,439 | 1,665,635 | 1,718,075 | – | 1,850,000 |
| Apr–May | 52,441 | 1,665,618 | 1,718,061 | – | 1,850,000 |
| Jun–Jul | 52,437 | 1,664,913 | 1,717,352 | – | 1,850,000 |
| Aug–Sep | 52,440 | 1,660,593 | 1,713,035 | – | 1,850,000 |
| Oct–Nov | 52,440 | 1,660,312 | 1,712,753 | – | 1,850,000 |
| Dec–Jan 2023 | 52,440 | 1,661,204 | 1,713,645 | – | 1,850,000 |
| Feb–Mar | 52,440 | 1,661,077 | 1,713,518 | – | 1,850,000 |
| Apr–May | 52,393 | 1,660,634 | 1,713,028 | – | 1,850,000 |
| Jun–Jul | 52,443 | 1,660,307 | 1,712,752 | – | 1,850,000 |
| Aug–Sep | 52,464 | 1,659,969 | 1,712,435 | – | 1,850,000 |

==== Criticism of PEPP ====
Overall, the PEPP programme was widely welcomed by market participants and European policy makers. However, in March 2021, a group of German economists and lawyers filed a lawsuit against the PEPP at the German Federal Constitutional Court.

===== New TLTRO III and PELTROs =====
On 30 April 2020, the ECB Governing council introduced additional measures to support the economy during the COVID-19 pandemic, including PELTROs and new modalities for the TLTROs.

First, the ECB made several adjustments to the framework of its TLTRO III. A key change was that the ECB also reduced the interest rate applied to these open market operations to a rate going as low as −1% for the banks meeting the lending threshold of 0%. With the TLTRO III, the participating banks were thus enabled to borrow at lower interest rates than those paid on their excess reserve. Another key change was that ECB's decision to expand bank's borrowing allowance under TLTRO III from 30% to 50%, then up to 55% of their portfolio of loans to firms and households.

Second, the ECB introduced pandemic emergency long-term refinancing operations (PELTROs). The market operations are similar to the TLTRO III, but are conduced in a more frequent basis in order to ensure smooth liquidity provision to the market.

During the pandemic, these monetary responses proved essential. In their absence, a credit crunch would normally have taken place. Indeed, increase in demand traditionally translates in a rise of borrowing costs. Reports from various member states central banks on the matter indicate that loans supply by participating banks has indeed expanded, in line with the ECB policy. Accordingly, thorough academic studies have confirmed the actual enhancement of financing conditions and the avoidance of credit scarcity. In fact, the credit to firms attained unprecedented levels when from March to May 2020, it increased by €250 billion on aggregate. Furthermore, analysts observed that even non-participating banks (to the TLTROs and PELTROs) benefited from it in parallel manners.

==== Transmission Protection instrument (TPI) ====
The Transmission Protection Instrument (TPI) is a tool the ECB could use to ensure monetary policy decisions are smoothly transmitted across all euro area countries, introduced on 21 July 2022. Under the TPI, the ECB would be able to purchase securities in the secondary market, to counter against "unwanted, disorderly market dynamics", self fulfilling crises market expectations that do not reflect reality, thus not justified by "country specific fundamentals." The TPI thus enables the ECB to control the difference between borrowing costs across the euro area, thereby reducing fragmentation risk across the euro area. By not letting interfere market dynamics that do not reflect economic reality, the ECB fulfils its secondary mandate under the TFEU, namely "to support the general economic policies of the Union." Although PEPP would remain the first line of defence to counter for transmission risks, the TPI should be seen as an addition to the ECB's toolkit.

===== Eligible securities under the TPI =====
Contrary to the PEPP and the APP, the TPI does not have an ex ante upper limit on the purchase of securities. Although the ECB has stated it would primarily buy only government bonds on the secondary market maturing between 1 and 10 years, the bonds purchased fall under the complete discretion of the ECB and does not necessarily follow the capital key, and private securities could be considered as well. However, there are four conditions that need to be met before securities are eligible for purchasing under TPI:

1. Compliance with the fiscal framework of the EU and not be involved in the excessive deficit procedure;
2. Absence of macroeconomic imbalances and not being involved in an excessive macroeconomic imbalance procedure, demonstrating that it is in compliance with the commission's recommendations;
3. Sovereign debt trajectory must be sustainable, assessed by the ECB and other relevant bodies;
4. Stick to commitments made under the Recovery and Resilience Facility, proving that the government follows sound and sustainable macroeconomic policies.

The conditions for government bonds to be eligible under the TPI draw heavily on the macroeconomic governance, and making sure that politicians do not take decisions that facilitate speculation. The decision by the ECB to support a country by using the TPI will depend on the severity of the risks a country faces. Government debt should thus be sustainable to be eligible for TPI purchases.

If the aforementioned conditions are met, the ECB could decide to activate the TPI. Purchases will be ended under the TPI either due to increased transmission of monetary policy or the risks have proven to be country-specific. By September 2026 TPI had never been used.

===== Effects of and critiques on the TPI =====
The TPI enables the Governing Council to a more rapid increase in interest rate, the first raise in interest rates by the ECB in 11 years. and the unpredictable nature of market sentiment could justify the reason for ECB-intervention to stabilise the monetary union, more or less the same reasoning as for the PEPP.

However, the relationship between the PEPP and the TPI raises questions as the PEPP would remain the first line of defence against transmission risks. The creation of the TPI seems legally vulnerably: problems in the Euro Area are common and recurring, but it is not automatically the argument to invent a whole new anti-fragmentation tool. With the TPI, the ECB can put pressure on countries by assessing publicly if they are eligible for the TPI, that is assessing whether the government has conducted adequate fiscal policies and structural reforms to deserve the support of the ECB. This endangers the politic neutrality of the ECB. If ever deployed, the usage of the TPI will spark controversy as the conditions to be deployed are not watertight.

===== Strategy Review (2020-2021) =====
As a consequence of the COVID-19 crisis, the ECB extended the duration of the strategy review until September 2021. On 13 July 2021, the ECB presented the outcomes of the strategy review, with the main following announcements:

- The ECB announced a new inflation target of 2% instead of its "close but below two per cent" inflation target. The ECB also made it clear it could overshoot its target under certain circumstances.
- The ECB announced it would try to incorporate the cost of housing (imputed rents) into its inflation measurement
- The ECB announced an action plan on climate change

The ECB also said it would carry out another strategy review in 2025.

=== Inflation surge of 2021 ===
In the summer of 2021, coinciding with the European Central Bank's announcement of its revised monetary policy framework and its initiative for climate action, the eurozone witnessed a notable inflationary surge. This resurgence of inflation continued to escalate over the following year, culminating in inflation rates reaching double digits for the first time since the 1970s, a year after the ECB's strategic updates. The inflation rate reached an unprecedented peak of 4.9% in November 2021, marking the highest level since the introduction of the euro.

==== Framing of the crisis ====
The new era of inflation prompted a significant shift in the European Central Bank's framing compared to its stance in the 2000s. Initially, from its inception until the 2008 financial crisis, the ECB's primary objective was price stability, adhering to strict institutional rules that minimized policy trade-offs with other goals beyond price stability. This approach was rooted in the "Central Bank Independence template", advocating that central bank's limited role to price stability and its independence were optimal.

However, the post-financial crisis landscape, especially during the Euro area crisis and subsequent economic stagnation era, necessitated a substantial revision in the ECB's strategy. The ECB moved away from its original Central Bank Independence template, leading to a blurring of its objective hierarchy. It adopted new strategies such as acting as a lender of last resort for the banking system and fostering growth through very low interest rates and extensive asset purchase programs, which were designed to help stabilize specific market segments and in the end revive growth.

In 2021, the European Central Bank embraced a significant strategic pivot by adopting its Climate Action Plan along with a new monetary policy strategy. This shift aimed to institutionalize the ECB's evolving role, moving beyond the singular focus on price stability—a policy shaped largely by the aftermath of the Euro area crisis. Instead, the ECB began acknowledging its multifaceted responsibilities, which now include maintaining financial stability, supporting economic growth, and addressing climate-related objectives. However, with the surging of inflation in 2021, some wondered as to whether the European Central Bank would revert to its foundational role, predominantly focused on chasing the "inflation monsters". The term "inflation monsters'' echoes the 2010 video of the ECB where two young people are facing a blue inflation monster unleashing banknotes and threatening to wreck the economy. Nevertheless, ECB policymakers effectively drew connections between the Central Bank Independence (CBI) framework and the experiences of the stagflation era to rationalize their decision to increase interest rates, avoiding the need for a discourse on regime change. In doing so, they recognized the complex trade-offs inherent in balancing various macroeconomic objectives and the challenging decisions they had to face.

It was with this new monetary strategy that the eurozone found itself facing rising inflation in 2021. Recent studies stated that key debate among policymakers centered on whether this inflationary trend would be transitory or permanent. Paul Krugman argued that the current inflationary surge would prove to be transitory, whereas other economists such as Olivier Blanchard and Larry Summers had issued warnings regarding the possible persistence of this inflation. Initially, both the European Central Bank and the Federal Reserve misjudged the situation, assuming the inflation spike to be temporary and expecting a swift return to their inflation target. This misperception led to the ECB's initial inaction regarding its monetary policy.

==== Response to the 2021 inflation crisis ====
After big increases in the inflation rates throughout 2021 and 2022, the European Central Bank and the FED finally decided to raise their interest rates and abandon their very low interest rates, for the first time since the Euro area crisis and the end of the CBI era, as it had become clear the inflationary trend was not temporary. This decision came in late July 2022 for the ECB, when the inflation rate in the eurozone was already at 8.9% and had been higher than the 2% target for more than a year, and in March 2022 for the FED. The European Central Bank's response to the Federal Reserve's actions can partly be attributed to concerns about imported inflation from the USA. Specifically, if the FED increases its policy rates while the ECB remains static, it could lead to a depreciation of the euro against the dollar. Such a scenario would likely result in higher import costs for the eurozone, as many global trade goods are priced in dollars. On the other hand, this would benefit the US economy by making imports from the eurozone cheaper.

Furthermore, the impact of US dollar appreciation, following the FED's policy rate hikes, tends to be more pronounced in the international inflation rates of energy and food. These commodities are commonly priced in US dollars, making their inflation rates more sensitive to exchange rate variations. In the European Union, public inflation expectations are significantly influenced by the prices of energy and food. Thus, this form of imported inflation can further exacerbate overall inflation levels of the eurozone.

The ECB also declared its intention to systematically diminish net asset purchases within their asset purchase program (APP) and end them under the pandemic emergency purchase program (PEPP) launched during the COVID crisis by the first trimester of 2022. On the other hand, the Federal Reserve initiated the reduction of its asset purchase program in November 2021, to finally stop it by March 2022. The Asset Purchase Programs of the ECB initially boosted asset values on bank balance sheets and led to expectations of lower future short short-term interest rates. These programs also raised inflation expectations, eventually reanchoring long-term inflation expectations. Phasing out the Asset Purchase Programs thus signals alignment with the different policy rate hikes in an attempt to cool down the economy and demonstrates a commitment to combating inflation.

Research indicates that the European Central Bank responded to the escalating inflation more slowly and cautiously than the FED, showing hopes that a moderate tightening of monetary policy would suffice. The ECB was notably slower in acknowledging the mistaken nature of its initial assumption that the inflationary trend would be transitory. The transition away from extremely low interest rates was soon accompanied by various rate increases, culminating in the ECB's main rate reaching 4% by the end of September. In contrast, the FED's latest rate hike elevated the Effective Federal Funds Rate to 5.33% in August, underscoring a more aggressive and rapid tightening of monetary policy compared to the ECB's approach. However, the global monetary tightening cycle turned out to be the most synchronized one in the past half-century. By February 2023, more than 90% of economies had hiked their policy rates. The latest peak of highly synchronized action by central banks was during the 1970s and the oil prices shocks where 70% of them had raised their interest rates.

==== Critics regarding the new monetary policy ====
Criticism first emerged regarding the methodologies used for inflation estimation and their failure to anticipate the inflation surge. A primary critique focused on the inadequacy of traditional tools like the Phillips Curve, which examines the relationship between inflation and certain economic activity indicators, for accurately forecasting inflation. During the 1970s, the Phillips Curve also faced significant criticism for its inability to accurately predict the inflation experienced in that decade. This period marked a critical reassessment of the curve's predictive capacity, particularly in the context of the economic phenomena of the time. Traditional indicators used for forecasting economic dynamics, such as the output and unemployment gaps, were found to be inadequate in signaling the overheating of the economy and the prevailing tight labor market conditions. Moreover, the important belief among central banks that sustained inflationary increases are a consequence of unanchored long-term inflation expectations was challenged during 2021–2022. During this period, inflation expectations remained relatively stable, leading to the misinterpretations by the European Central Bank and other monetary authorities regarding the inflationary trend's nature. Both the FED and the ECB argued that the rise in inflation was only temporary and was the sole result of post-pandemic supply disruptions on a few selected goods and services (food and energy). The FED and the ECB then maintained their expansionary monetary policy, keeping interest rates low.

Some critics have also emerged saying that it was complicated for independent central banks, including the ECB, to accurately assess during a synchronized policy rate hike the potential spillovers of cross-countries monetary policy on the inflation. This might lead to excessive monetary tightening (higher interest rates) in unusual circumstances.

Concerns have also been raised about the European Central Bank's effectiveness in addressing the recent surge in energy prices. Some experts suggest that the eurozone should be viewed as a small open economy, implying that changes in its demand may not significantly impact global prices. Moreover, they argue that monetary policy might have minimal influence on the global demand for energy. This is because household demand for essentials like heating and transportation is believed to be relatively insensitive to price changes. Additionally, while a stronger euro could theoretically lead to lower import prices, it's uncertain whether these savings would be effectively passed on to consumers.

However, recent studies contradict these views by highlighting the significant role of energy prices in the transmission of monetary policy within the eurozone. An increase in the ECB's policy rates tends to appreciate the euro against the dollar. This appreciation can lead to higher local energy costs but may also reduce demand, potentially lowering global energy prices. These studies support the ECB's decision to follow the Federal Reserve's lead in raising policy rates, which appears to have been a strategic move to curb imported inflation and address the spike in energy prices.

==== Effects of the monetary tightening ====
The implementing a of tighter monetary policy has emerged as the eurozone solution to fight the latest inflationary pressure. However, this approach bears the risk of hindering the progress of the economic revival post-COVID.

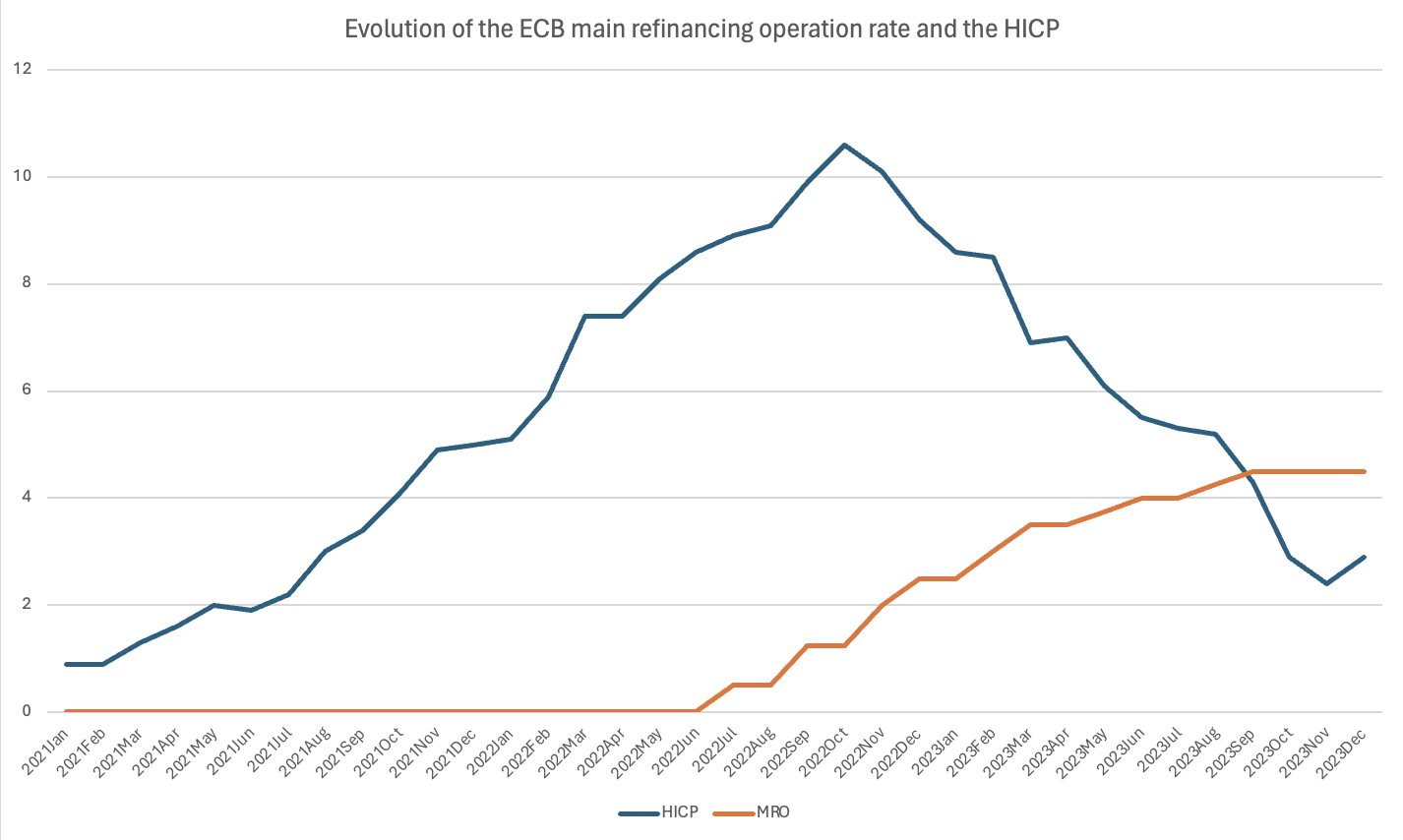
Evolution of the MRO rate and the HICP for the EU

Raising interest rates is a strategic move by the ECB with specific aims: to decelerate economic activity, stabilize inflation expectations, and steer towards lower inflation levels. Studies have shown that as interest rates rise, the price on the world market does not really change. However, the Euro becomes more attractive to investors, leading to its appreciation against other currencies. This change benefits households paying for gas in Euros, as it translates into lower prices for dollar-traded oil.

On the other hand, the increase in interest rates, while helping to suppress prices, also places strains on the manufacturing sector and the labor market. The aftermath of this shock sees tighter financing conditions and a dip in demand, resulting in a slight uptick in unemployment rates, going beyond 0.1 percentage points. Although the study shows that manufacturing sector quickly rebounds, returning to its pre-shock state within about three months, the impact on unemployment rates lingers for a longer period.

=== 2025 ===
In May 2025, the European Central Bank launched a platform involving around 70 market participants to test digital euro payment functionalities and use cases. The initiative includes banks, fintechs, and merchants, aiming to simulate a digital euro ecosystem and support the development of future payment solutions. As of August 2025, enabling legislation has not been passed by European lawmakers to enable the digital euro to become operational. Bank president Lagarde has urged lawmakers to "seize the 'euro moment'" and rapidly put in place a legislative framework to "pave the way for the potential introduction of a digital euro," in order to address the considerable risk posed by U.S. dollar-linked stablecoins.

== Mandate and inflation target ==
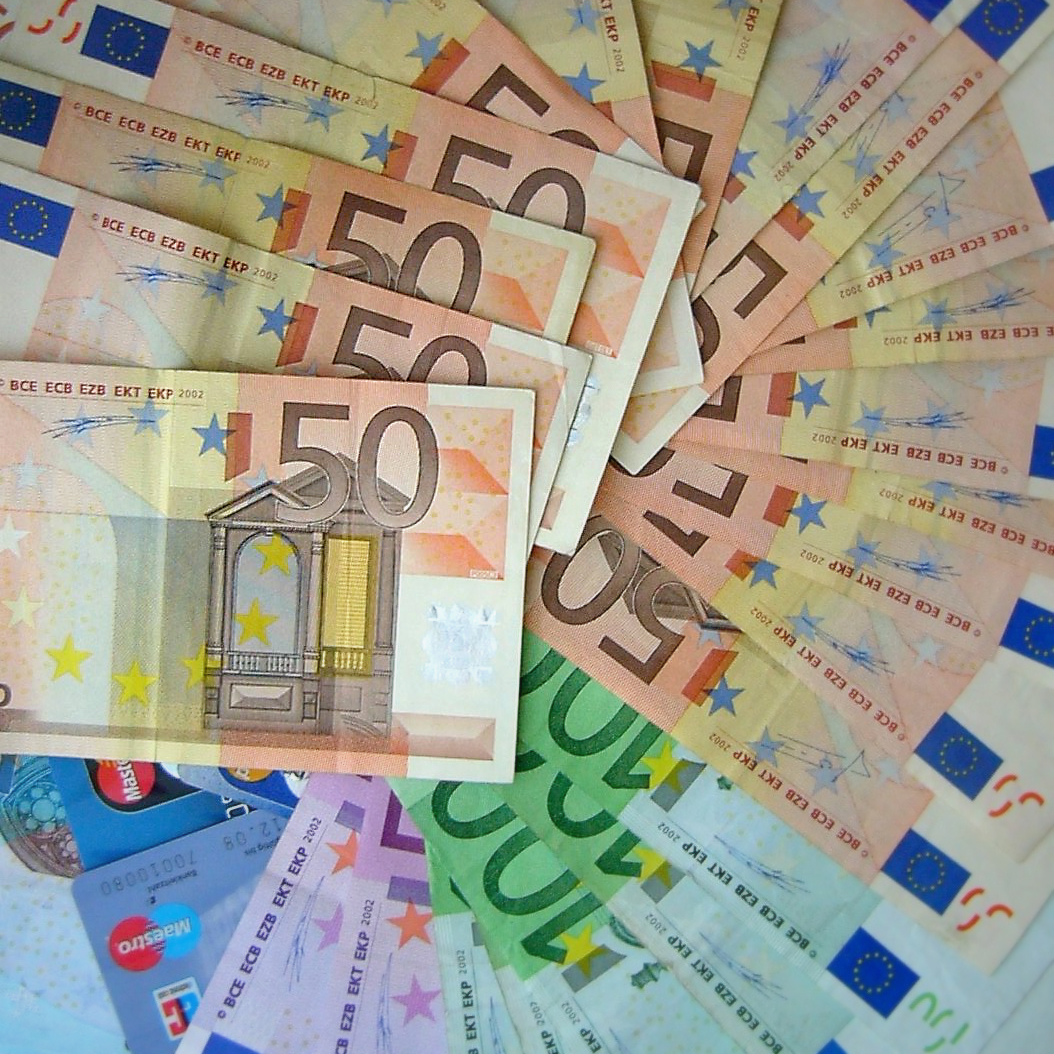
Euro banknotes

The ECB has one primary objective – price stability – subject to which it may pursue secondary objectives.

=== Primary mandate ===
The primary objective of the European Central Bank, set out in Article 127(1) of the Treaty on the Functioning of the European Union, is to maintain price stability within the Eurozone. However the EU Treaties do not specify exactly how the ECB should pursue this objective. The European Central Bank has ample discretion over the way it pursues its price stability objective, as it can self-decide on the inflation target, and may also influence the way inflation is being measured.

The precise formulation of the price stability objective has changed over the years: The Governing Council in October 1998 defined price stability as inflation of under 2%, "a year-on-year increase in the Harmonised Index of Consumer Prices (HICP) for the euro area of below 2%" and added that price stability "was to be maintained over the medium term". In May 2003, following a thorough review of the ECB's monetary policy strategy, the Governing Council clarified that "in the pursuit of price stability, it aims to maintain inflation rates below, but close to, 2% over the medium term". In 2016, the European Central Bank's president has further adjusted its communication, by introducing the notion of "symmetry" in its definition of its target, thus making it clear that the ECB should respond both to inflationary pressures and to deflationary pressures. As Draghi once said "symmetry meant not only that we would not accept persistently low inflation, but also that there was no cap on inflation at 2%."

On 8 July 2021, as a result of the strategic review led by the new president Christine Lagarde, the ECB officially abandoned the "below but close to two per cent" definition and adopted instead a 2% symmetric inflation target over the medium term.

=== Secondary mandate ===
Without prejudice to the objective of price stability, the Treaty (127 TFEU) also provides room for the ECB to pursue other objectives:

Without prejudice to the objective of price stability, the ESCB shall support the general economic policies in the Union with a view to contributing to the achievement of the objectives of the Union as laid down in Article 3 of the Treaty on European Union.

This legal provision is often considered to provide a "secondary mandate" to the ECB and offers ample justifications for the ECB to also prioritize other considerations such as full employment or environmental protection, which are mentioned in the Article 3 of the Treaty on the European Union. At the same time, economists and commentators are often divided on whether and how the ECB should pursue those secondary objectives, in particular the environmental impact. ECB official have also frequently pointed out the possible contradictions between those secondary objectives. To better guide the ECB's action on its secondary objectives, it has been suggested that closer consultation with the European Parliament would be warranted. In 2023, the ECB recognised the possible role of the European Parliament in the prioritisation of its secondary objectives.

=== Tasks ===
To carry out its main mission, the ECB's tasks include:

- Defining and implementing monetary policy
- Managing foreign exchange operations
- Maintaining the payment system to promote smooth operation of the financial market infrastructure under the T2 payments system and being currently developed technical platform for the settlement of securities in Europe (TARGET2-Securities).
- Consultative role: by law, the ECB's opinion is required on any national or EU legislation that falls within the ECB's competence.
- Collection and establishment of statistics
- International cooperation
- Issuing banknotes: the ECB holds the exclusive right to authorise the issuance of euro banknotes. Member states can issue euro coins, but the amount must be authorised by the ECB beforehand (upon the introduction of the euro, the ECB also had exclusive right to issue coins).
- Financial stability and prudential policy
- Banking supervision: since 2013, the ECB has been put in charge of supervising systemically relevant banks.

=== Monetary policy tools ===
The principal monetary policy tool of the European central bank is collateralised borrowing or repo agreements. The collateral used by the ECB is typically high quality public and private sector debt.

All lending to credit institutions must be collateralised as required by Article 18 of the Statute of the ESCB.

The criteria for determining "high quality" for public debt have been preconditions for membership in the European Union: total debt must not be too large in relation to a gross domestic product, for example, and deficits in any given year must not become too large. Though these criteria are fairly simple, a number of accounting techniques may hide the underlying reality of fiscal solvency—or the lack of the same.

Monetary policy instruments of the ECB (November 2024)
| Type of instrument | Name of instrument | Maintenance period | Rate | Volume (€ millions) |
|---|---|---|---|---|
| Standing facilities (rate corridor) | Marginal lending facility | Overnight | 3.65% | |
| Standing facilities (rate corridor) | Deposit facility | Overnight | 3.25% | |
| Refinancing operations (collateralized repos) | Main refinancing operations (MROs) | 7 days | 3.4% | 6,660 |
| Refinancing operations (collateralized repos) | Long-term refinancing operations (LTROs) | 3 months to 3 years | Average MRO rate | 12,990 |
| Refinancing operations (collateralized repos) | Targeted-Long Term Refinancing Operations (TLTROs) | Up to 4 years | DFR | 29,160 |
| Asset purchases | Asset-backed securities purchase programme (ABSPP) | n/a | n/a | 7,428 |
| Asset purchases | Covered bonds purchase programme (CBPP) | n/a | n/a | 254,896 |
| Asset purchases | Corporate sector purchase programme (CSPP) | n/a | n/a | 292,299 |
| Asset purchases | Public sector purchase programme (PSPP) | n/a | n/a | 2,143,646 |
| Asset purchases | Pandemic emergency purchase programme (PEPP) | n/a | n/a | 1,619,343 |
| Asset purchases | Securities markets programme (SMP) – Terminated | n/a | n/a | 1,330 |
| Reserve requirements | Minimum reserves | 6 weeks | 1% | 161,936 |

=== Difference with US Federal Reserve ===
In the United States Federal Reserve, the Federal Reserve buys assets: typically, bonds issued by the Federal government. There is no limit on the bonds that it can buy and one of the tools at its disposal in a financial crisis is to take such extraordinary measures as the purchase of large amounts of assets such as commercial paper. The purpose of such operations is to ensure that adequate liquidity is available for the functioning of the financial system.

The Eurosystem, on the other hand, uses collateralized lending as a default instrument. There are about 1,500 eligible banks which may bid for short-term repo contracts. The difference is that banks in effect borrow cash from the ECB and must pay it back; the short durations allow interest rates to be adjusted continually. When the repo notes come due the participating banks bid again. An increase in the number of notes offered at auction allows an increase in liquidity in the economy. A decrease has the contrary effect. The contracts are carried on the asset side of the European Central Bank's balance sheet and the resulting deposits in member banks are carried as a liability. In layman's terms, the liability of the central bank is money, and an increase in deposits in member banks carried as a liability by the central bank, means that more money has been put into the economy. (Note: The process is similar, though on a grand scale, to an individual who every month charges $10,000 on his or her credit card, pays it off every month, but also withdraws (and pays off) an additional $10,000 each succeeding month for transaction purposes. Such a person is operating "net borrowed" on a continual basis, and even though the borrowing from the credit card is short-term, the effect is a stable increase in the money supply. If the person borrows less, less money circulates in the economy. As people borrow more, the money supply increases. An individual's ability to borrow from his or her credit card company is determined by the credit card company: it reflects the company's overall judgment of its ability to lend to all borrowers, and also its appraisal of the financial condition of that one particular borrower. The ability of member banks to borrow from the central bank is fundamentally similar.)

To qualify for participation in the auctions, banks must be able to offer proof of appropriate collateral in the form of loans to other entities. These can be the public debt of member states, but a fairly wide range of private banking securities are also accepted. The fairly stringent membership requirements for the European Union, especially with regard to sovereign debt as a percentage of each member state's gross domestic product, are designed to ensure that assets offered to the bank as collateral are, at least in theory, all equally good, and all equally protected from the risk of inflation.

== Organisation ==
The ECB has four decision-making bodies, that take all the decisions with the objective of fulfilling the ECB's mandate:

- the Executive Board,
- the Governing Council,
- the General Council,
- the Supervisory Board.

=== Decision-making bodies ===
==== Executive Board ====
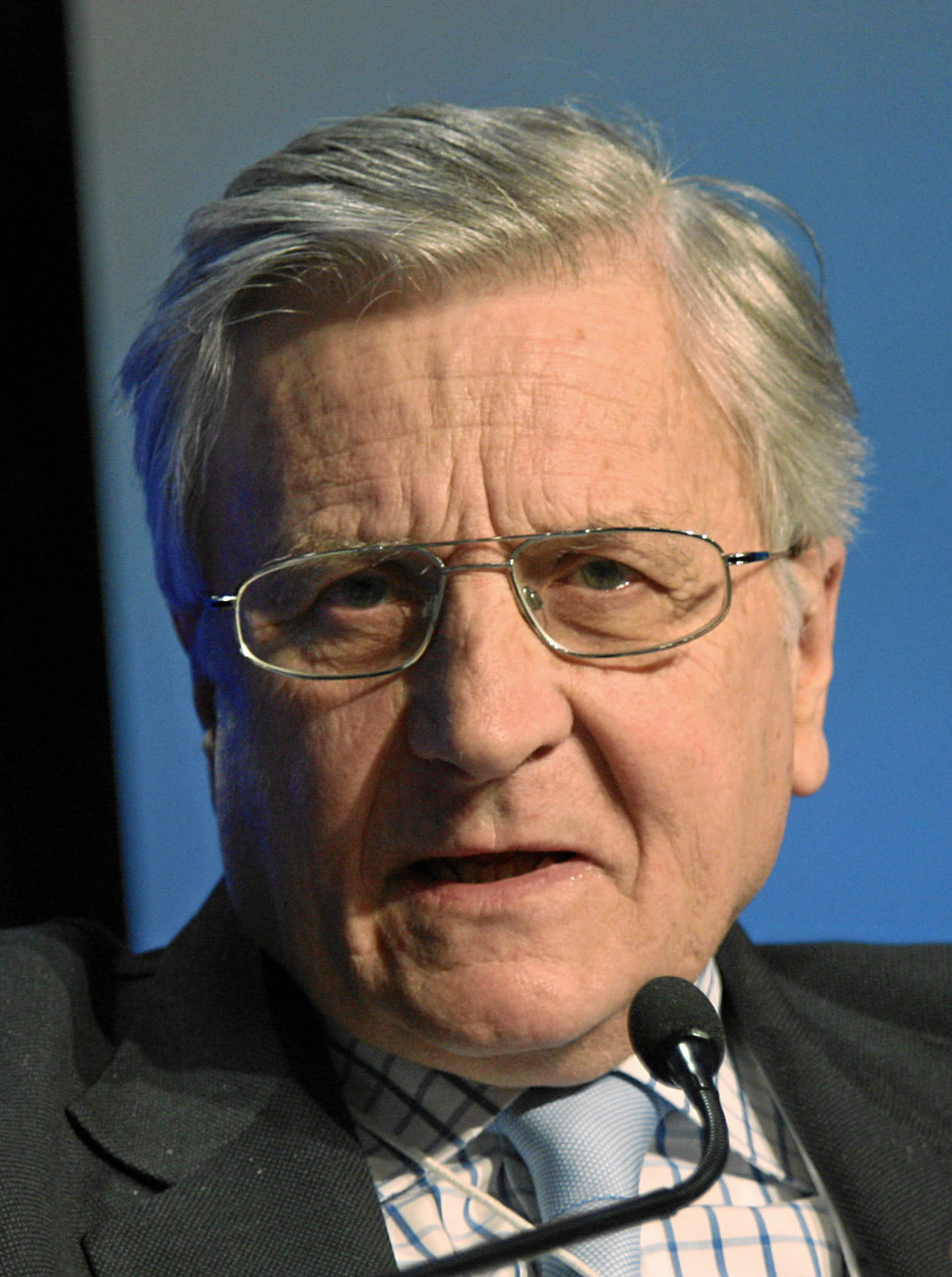
Jean-Claude Trichet, the second President of the European Central Bank

The Executive Board is responsible for the implementation of monetary policy (defined by the Governing Council) and the day-to-day running of the bank. It can issue decisions to national central banks and may also exercise powers delegated to it by the Governing Council. Executive Board members are assigned a portfolio of responsibilities by the President of the ECB. The executive board normally meets every Tuesday.

It is composed of the President of the Bank (currently Christine Lagarde), the Vice-president (currently Boris Vujčić) and four other members. They are all appointed by the European Council for non-renewable terms of eight years. Members of the executive board of the ECB are appointed "from among persons of recognised standing and professional experience in monetary or banking matters by common accord of the governments of the Member States at the level of Heads of State or Government, on a recommendation from the Council, after it has consulted the European Parliament and the Governing Council of the ECB".

José Manuel González-Páramo, a Spanish member of the executive board since June 2004, was due to leave the board in early June 2012, but no replacement had been named as of late May. The Spanish had nominated Barcelona-born Antonio Sáinz de Vicuña – an ECB veteran who heads its legal department – as González-Páramo's replacement as early as January 2012, but alternatives from Luxembourg, Finland, and Slovenia were put forward and no decision made by May. After a long political battle and delays due to the European Parliament's protest over the lack of gender balance at the ECB, Luxembourg's Yves Mersch was appointed as González-Páramo's replacement.

In December 2020, Frank Elderson succeeded to Yves Mersch at the ECB's board.

==== Governing Council ====
The Governing Council is the main decision-making body of the Eurosystem. It comprises the members of the executive board (six in total) and the governors of the National Central Banks of the euro area countries (21 as of 2026).

According to Article 284 of the TFEU, the President of the Economic and Financial Affairs Council (ECOFIN) and a representative from the European Commission may attend the meetings as observers, but they lack voting rights.

Since January 2015, the ECB has published on its website a summary of the Governing Council deliberations ("accounts"). These publications came as a partial response to recurring criticism against the ECB's opacity. However, in contrast to other central banks, the ECB still does not disclose individual voting records of the governors seating in its council.

In December 2025, the ECB proposed a simplification of EU banking rules to simplify the European regulatory, supervisory and reporting framework. The proposal was introduced and endorsed by the Governing Council.

Members of the Governing Council (as of June 2026)
| | Name | Role | Terms of office | |
|---|---|---|---|---|
| Executive Board | (France) Christine Lagarde | President | 1 November 2019 | 31 October 2027 |
| Executive Board | (Croatia) Boris Vujčić | Vice-president | 1 June 2026 | 31 May 2034 |
| Executive Board | (Italy) Piero Cipollone | Member of the Executive Board | 1 November 2023 | 31 October 2031 |
| Executive Board | (Netherlands) Frank Elderson | Member of the Executive Board; Vice-chair of the Supervisory board | 15 December 2020 | 14 December 2028 |
| Executive Board | (Republic of Ireland) Philip R. Lane | Member of the Executive Board & Chief Economist | 1 June 2019 | 31 May 2027 |
| Executive Board | (Germany) Isabel Schnabel | Member of the Executive Board | 1 January 2020 | 31 December 2027 |
| National Governors | (Austria) Martin Kocher | | 1 September 2025 | 31 August 2031 |
| National Governors | (Belgium) Pierre Wunsch | | 2 January 2019 | January 2029 |
| National Governors | (Bulgaria) Dimitar Radev | | 14 July 2015 | 14 July 2027 |
| National Governors | (Croatia) Ante Žigman | | 19 June 2026 | 19 June 2032 |
| National Governors | (Cyprus) Christodoulos Patsalides | | 11 April 2024 | April 2029 |
| National Governors | (Estonia) Ülo Kaasik | | 7 June 2026 | 7 June 2033 |
| National Governors | (Finland) Olli Rehn | | 12 July 2018 | 12 July 2032 |
| National Governors | (France) Emmanuel Moulin | | 2 June 2026 | June 2032 |
| National Governors | (Germany) Joachim Nagel | | 1 January 2022 | January 2030 |
| National Governors | (Greece) Yannis Stournaras | | June 2014 | June 2032 |
| National Governors | (Republic of Ireland) Gabriel Makhlouf | | 1 September 2019 | 1 September 2033 |
| National Governors | (Italy) Fabio Panetta | | 1 November 2023 | 31 October 2028 |
| National Governors | (Latvia) Mārtiņš Kazāks | | 21 December 2019 | 21 December 2029 |
| National Governors | (Lithuania) Gediminas Šimkus | | 7 April 2021 | 6 April 2031 |
| National Governors | (Luxembourg) Gaston Reinesch | | January 2013 | January 2031 |
| National Governors | (Malta) Alexander Demarco | | 1 January 2026 | 31 December 2030 |
| National Governors | (Netherlands) Olaf Sleijpen | | 1 July 2025 | May 2032 |
| National Governors | (Portugal) Álvaro Santos Pereira | | 17 September 2025 | 17 September 2030 |
| National Governors | (Slovenia) Primož Dolenc | | February 2026 | February 2032 |
| National Governors | (Slovakia) Peter Kažimír | | 1 June 2019 | 1 June 2025 |
| National Governors | (Spain) José Luis Escrivá | | 6 September 2024 | 5 September 2030 |

==== General Council ====
The General Council is a body dealing with transitional issues of euro adoption, for example, fixing the exchange rates of currencies being replaced by the euro (continuing the tasks of the former EMI). It will continue to exist until all EU member states adopt the euro, at which point it will be dissolved. It is composed of the President and Vice-president together with the governors of all of the EU's national central banks.

==== Supervisory Board ====
The ECB Supervisory Board meets twice a month to discuss, plan and carry out the ECB's supervisory tasks. It proposes draft decisions to the Governing Council under the non-objection procedure. It is composed of Chair (appointed for a non-renewable term of five years), Vice-chair (chosen from among the members of the ECB's executive board) four ECB representatives and representatives of national supervisors. If the national supervisory authority designated by a Member State is not a national central bank (NCB), the representative of the competent authority can be accompanied by a representative from their NCB. In such cases, the representatives are together considered as one member for the purposes of the voting procedure.

It also includes the Steering Committee, which supports the activities of the supervisory board and prepares the Board's meetings. It is composed by the chair of the supervisory board, Vice-chair of the supervisory board, one ECB representative and five representatives of national supervisors. The five representatives of national supervisors are appointed by the supervisory board for one year based on a rotation system that ensures a fair representation of countries.

=== Capital subscription ===
The ECB is governed by European law directly, but its setup resembles that of a corporation in the sense that the ECB has shareholders and stock capital. Its initial capital was supposed to be €5 billion and the initial capital allocation key was determined in 1998 on the basis of the member states' populations and GDP, but the key is adjustable. The euro area NCBs were required to pay their respective subscriptions to the ECB's capital in full. The NCBs of the non-participating countries have had to pay 7% of their respective subscriptions to the ECB's capital as a contribution to the operational costs of the ECB. As a result, the ECB was endowed with an initial capital of just under €4 billion. The capital is held by the national central banks of the member states as shareholders. Shares in the ECB are not transferable and cannot be used as collateral. The NCBs are the sole subscribers to and holders of the capital of the ECB.

Today, ECB capital is about €11 billion, which is held by the national central banks of the member states as shareholders. The NCBs' shares in this capital are calculated using a capital key which reflects the respective member's share in the total population and gross domestic product of the EU. The ECB adjusts the shares every five years and whenever the number of contributing NCBs changes. The adjustment is made on the basis of data provided by the European Commission.

All national central banks (NCBs) that own a share of the ECB capital stock as of 1 February 2020 are listed below. Non-Euro area NCBs are required to pay up only a very small percentage of their subscribed capital, which accounts for the different magnitudes of Euro area and Non-Euro area total paid-up capital.

| NCB | Capital Key (%) | Paid-up Capital (€) |
|---|---|---|
| National Bank of Belgium | 2.9630 | 276,290,916.71 |
| Bulgarian National Bank | 0.9832 | 3,991,180.11 |
| Croatian National Bank | 0.6595 | 71,390,921.62 |
| Deutsche Bundesbank | 21.4394 | 1,999,160,134.91 |
| Bank of Estonia | 0.2291 | 21,362,892.01 |
| Central Bank of Ireland | 1.3772 | 128,419,794.29 |
| Bank of Greece | 2.0117 | 187,585,027.73 |
| Bank of Spain | 9.6981 | 904,318,913.05 |
| Bank of France | 16.6108 | 1,548,907,579.93 |
| Bank of Italy | 13.8165 | 1,288,347,435.28 |
| Central Bank of Cyprus | 0.1750 | 16,318,228.29 |
| Bank of Latvia | 0.3169 | 29,549,980.26 |
| Bank of Lithuania | 0.4707 | 43,891,371.75 |
| Central Bank of Luxembourg | 0.2679 | 24,980,876.34 |
| Central Bank of Malta | 0.0853 | 7,953,970.70 |
| De Nederlandsche Bank | 4.7662 | 444,433,941.0 |
| Oesterreichische Nationalbank | 2.3804 | 221,965,203.55 |
| Banco de Portugal | 1.9035 | 177,495,700.29 |
| Bank of Slovenia | 0.3916 | 36,515,532.56 |
| National Bank of Slovakia | 0.9314 | 86,850,273.32 |
| Bank of Finland | 1.4939 | 136,005,388.82 |
| Euro area total | 82.9713 | 7,614,412,273.05 |
| Czech National Bank | 1.8794 | 7,629,194.36 |
| Danmarks Nationalbank | 1.7591 | 7,140,851.23 |
| Hungarian National Bank | 1.5488 | 6,287,164.11 |
| National Bank of Poland | 6.0335 | 24,492,255.06 |
| National Bank of Romania | 2.8289 | 11,483,573.44 |
| Sveriges Riksbank | 2.9790 | 12,092,886.02 |
| Non-Euro area total | 17.0287 | 69,125,924.22 |
| Net total | 100.0000 | 7,683,538,197.27 |

=== Reserves ===
In addition to capital subscriptions, the NCBs of the member states participating in the euro area provided the ECB with foreign reserve assets equivalent to around €40 billion. The contributions of each NCB is in proportion to its share in the ECB's subscribed capital, while in return each NCB is credited by the ECB with a claim in euro equivalent to its contribution. 15% of the contributions was made in gold, and the remaining 85% in US dollars and, to a lesser extent, Japanese yen.

=== Languages ===
The internal working language of the ECB is English, and press conferences are held in English. External communications are handled flexibly: English is preferred (though not exclusively) for communication within the ESCB (i.e. with other central banks) and with financial markets; communication with other national bodies and with EU citizens is normally in their respective language, but the ECB website is predominantly English; official documents such as the Annual Report are in the official languages of the EU (generally English, German and French).

In 2022, the ECB publishes for the first time details on the nationality of its staff, revealing an over-representation of Germans and Italians along the ECB employees, including in management positions.

=== Independence ===
The European Central Bank (and by extension, the Eurosystem) is often considered as the "most independent central bank in the world". In general terms, this means that the Eurosystem tasks and policies can be discussed, designed, decided and implemented in full autonomy, without pressure or need for instructions from any external body. The main justification for the ECB's independence is that such an institutional setup assists the maintenance of price stability.

In practice, the ECB's independence is pinned by four key principles:

- Operational and legal independence: the ECB has all required competences to achieve its price stability mandate and thereby can steer monetary policy in full autonomy and by means of high level of discretion. The ECB's governing council deliberates with a high degree of secrecy, since individual voting records are not disclosed to the public (leading to suspicions that Governing Council members are voting along national lines.) In addition to monetary policy decisions, the ECB has the right to issue legally binding regulations, within its competence and if the conditions laid down in Union law are fulfilled, it can sanction non-compliant actors if they violate legal requirements laid down in directly applicable Union regulations. The ECB's own legal personality also allows the ECB to enter into international legal agreements independently from other EU institutions, and be the party of legal proceedings. Finally, the ECB can organise its internal structure as it sees fit.
- Personal independence: the mandate of ECB board members is purposefully very long (8 years) and Governors of national central banks have a minimum renewable term of office of five years. In addition, ECB board members are vastly immune from judicial proceedings. Indeed, removals from the office can only be decided by the Court of Justice of the European Union (CJEU), under the request of the ECB's Governing Council or the executive board (i.e. the ECB itself). Such a decision is only possible in the event of incapacity or serious misconduct. National governors of the Eurosystem's national central banks can be dismissed under national law (with a possibility to appeal) in case they can no longer fulfil their functions or are guilty of serious misconduct.
- Financial independence: the ECB is the only body within the EU whose statute guarantees budgetary independence through its own resources and income. The ECB uses its own profits generated by its monetary policy operations and cannot be technically insolvent. The ECB's financial independence reinforces its political independence. Because the ECB does not require external financing and symmetrically is prohibited from direct monetary financing of public institutions, this shields it from potential pressure from public authorities.
- Political independence: The Community institutions and bodies and the governments of the member states may not seek to influence the members of the decision-making bodies of the ECB or of the NCBs in the performance of their tasks. Symmetrically, EU institutions and national governments are bound by the treaties to respect the ECB's independence. It is the latter which is the subject of much debate.

=== Democratic accountability ===
In return to its high degree of independence and discretion, the ECB is accountable to the European Parliament (and to a lesser extent to the European Court of Auditors, the European Ombudsman and the Court of Justice of the EU (CJEU)). Although the accountability mechanisms are not enshrined in EU law, several practices were established following a resolution of the European Parliament adopted in 1998, which were informally agreed by the ECB, and incorporated into the Parliament's rule of procedure. In 2023, the European Parliament and the ECB made these accountability arrangements were made more formal by signing an exchange of letter.

The accountability framework involves five main mechanisms:

- Annual report: the ECB is bound to publish reports on its activities and has to address its annual report to the European Parliament, the European Commission, the Council of the European Union and the European Council . The report is presented to the European parliament at the occasion of a specific hearing with the ECB's vice-president at the ECON committee.
- Annual parliamentary resolution: in return, the European Parliament evaluates the past activities to the ECB via its own annual resolution on the European Central Bank's report (which is essentially a non-legally-binding list of resolutions). Since 2016, the ECB replies to the Parliament's suggestions in an annex to its annual report.
- Quarterly hearings (known as the "Monetary Dialogue"): the Economic and Monetary Affairs Committee of the European Parliament organises a hearing with the ECB every quarter, allowing members of parliament to question the ECB president and enter into a discussion with him or her.
- Written parliamentary questions: all Members of the European Parliament have the right to address written questions to the ECB president. The ECB president provides a written answer in about six weeks.
- Appointments: The European Parliament is consulted during the appointment process of executive board members of the ECB. However the Parliament's vote is only consultative, and in practice, the Parliament's opinion – when negative – can be ignored by the European Council.
- Legal proceedings: the ECB's legal personality allows civil society or public institutions to file complaints against the ECB to the Court of Justice of the EU.

In 2013, an interinstitutional agreement was reached between the ECB and the European Parliament in the context of the establishment of the ECB's Banking Supervision. This agreement sets broader powers to the European Parliament than the established practice on the monetary policy side of the ECB's activities. For example, under the agreement, the Parliament can veto the appointment of the chair and vice-chair of the ECB's supervisory board and may approve removals if requested by the ECB.

=== Transparency ===
In addition to its independence, the ECB is subject to limited transparency obligations in contrast to EU Institutions standards and other major central banks. Indeed, as pointed out by Transparency International, "The Treaties establish transparency and openness as principles of the EU and its institutions. They do, however, grant the ECB a partial exemption from these principles. According to Art. 15(3) TFEU, the ECB is bound by the EU's transparency principles "only when exercising [its] administrative tasks" (the exemption – which leaves the term "administrative tasks" undefined – equally applies to the Court of Justice of the European Union and to the European Investment Bank).

In practice, there are several concrete examples where the ECB is less transparent than other institutions:

- Voting secrecy: while other central banks publish the voting record of its decision makers, the ECB's Governing Council decisions are made in full discretion. Since 2014, the ECB has published "accounts" of its monetary policy meetings, but those remain rather vague and do not include individual votes.
- Access to documents: The obligation for EU bodies to make documents freely accessible after a 30-year embargo applies to the ECB. However, under the ECB's Rules of Procedure, the Governing Council may decide to keep individual documents classified beyond the 30 years.
- Disclosure of securities: The ECB is less transparent than the Fed when it comes to disclosing the list of securities being held in its balance sheet under monetary policy operations such as QE.

== Location ==
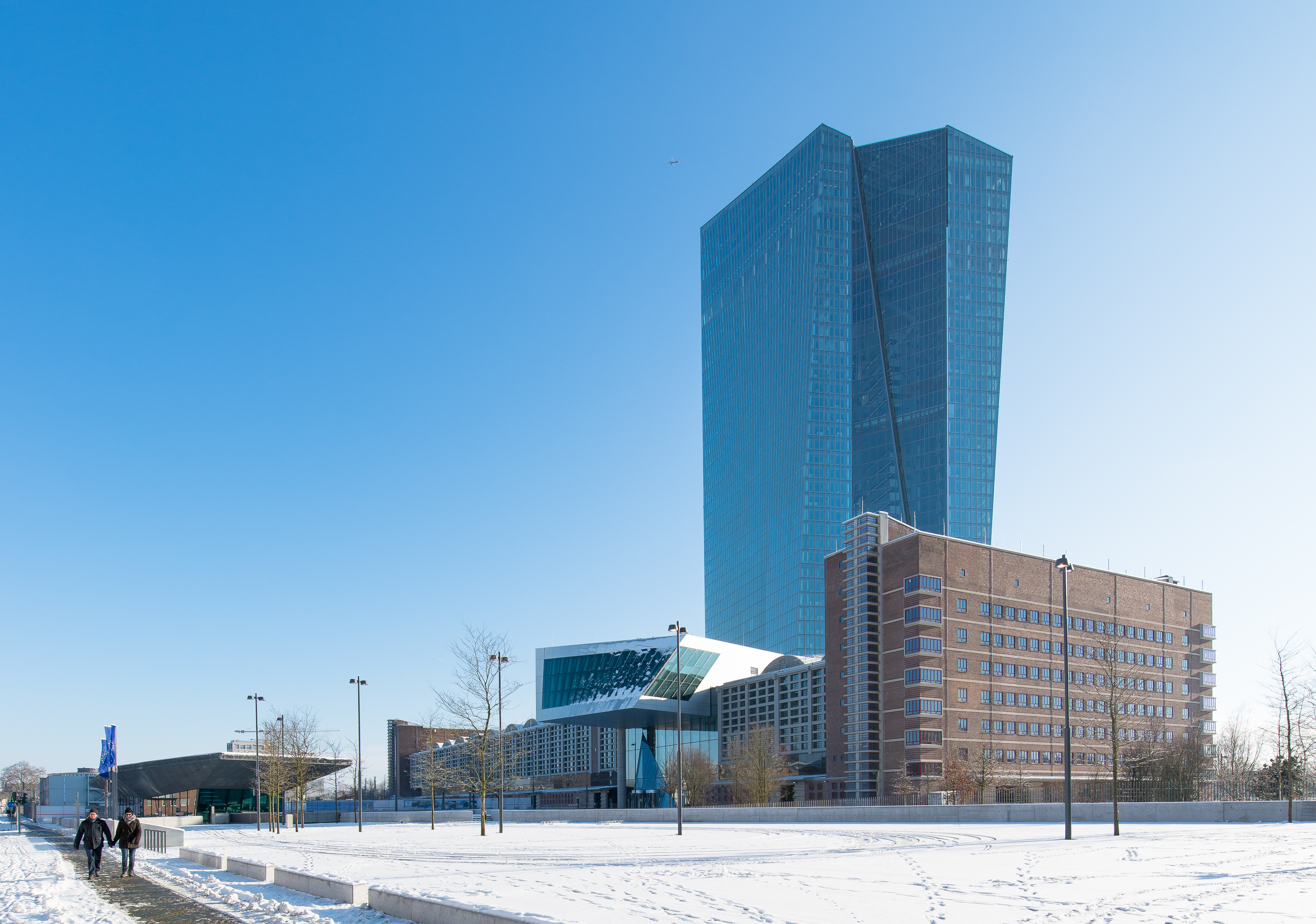
The new ECB headquarters, which opened in 2014

The bank is based in Ostend (East End), Frankfurt am Main. The city is the largest financial centre in the Eurozone and the bank's location in it is fixed by the Amsterdam Treaty. The bank moved to a new purpose-built headquarters in 2014, designed by a Vienna-based architectural office, Coop Himmelbau. The building is approximately 180 metres (591 ft) tall and is to be accompanied by other secondary buildings on a landscaped site on the site of the former wholesale market in the eastern part of Frankfurt am Main. The main construction on a 120,000 m^{2} total site area began in October 2008, and it was expected that the building would become an architectural symbol for Europe. While it was designed to accommodate double the number of staff who operated in the former Eurotower, that building has been retained by the ECB, owing to more space being required since it took responsibility for banking supervision.

== Debates surrounding the ECB ==
=== Debates on ECB independence ===
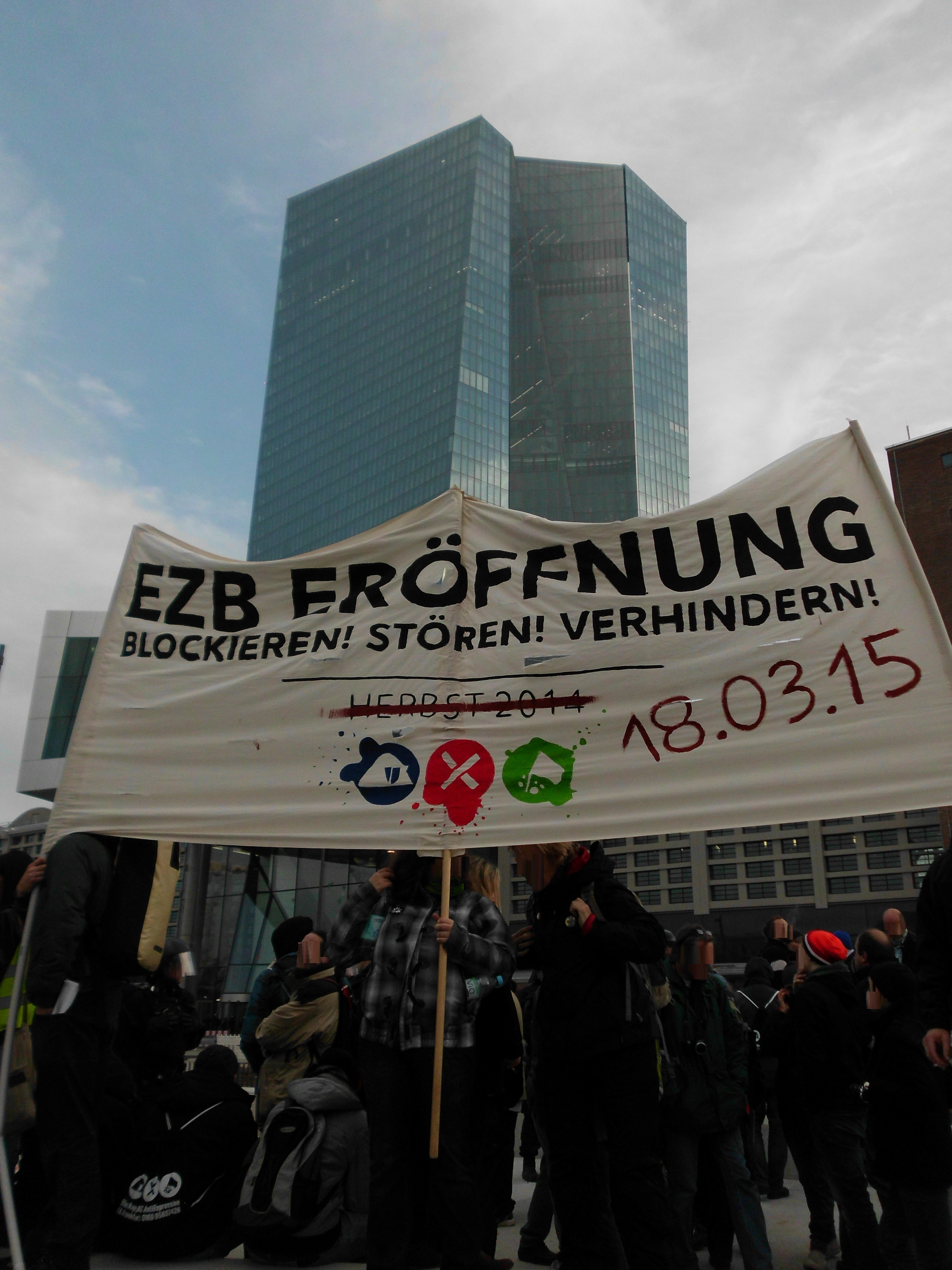
Demonstration of the Blockupy movement in front of the ECB (2014)

The debate on the independence of the ECB finds its origins in the preparatory stages of the construction of the EMU. The German government agreed to go ahead if certain crucial guarantees were respected, such as a European Central Bank independent of national governments and shielded from political pressure along the lines of the German central bank. The French government, for its part, feared that this independence would mean that politicians would no longer have any room for manoeuvre in the process. A compromise was then reached by establishing a regular dialogue between the ECB and the Council of Finance Ministers of the euro area, the Eurogroup.

==== Arguments in favour of independence ====
There is strong consensus among economists on the value of central bank independence from politics. The rationale behind are both empirical and theoretical. On the theoretical side, it's believed that time inconsistency suggests the existence of political business cycles where elected officials might take advantage of policy surprises to secure reelection. The politician up to the election will therefore be incentivized to introduce expansionary monetary policies, reducing unemployment in the short run. These effects will be most likely temporary. By contrast, in the long run, it will increase inflation, with unemployment returning to the natural rate negating the positive effect. Furthermore, the credibility of the central bank will deteriorate, making it more difficult to answer the market. Additionally, empirical work has been done that defined and measured central bank independence (CBI), looking at the relationship of CBI with inflation.

==== The arguments against too much independence ====
===== An independence that would be the source of a democratic deficit. =====
According to Christopher Adolph, the alleged neutrality of central bankers is only a legal façade and not an indisputable fact.

The crisis: an opportunity to impose its will and extend its powers:

– Its participation in the troika: Thanks to its three factors which explain its independence, the ECB took advantage of this crisis to implement, through its participation in the troika, the famous structural reforms in the Member States aimed at making, more flexible the various markets, particularly the labour market, which are still considered too rigid under the ordoliberal concept.

- Macro-prudential supervision : At the same time, taking advantage of the reform of the financial supervision system, the Frankfurt Bank has acquired new responsibilities, such as macro-prudential supervision, in other words, supervision of the provision of financial services.

-Take liberties with its mandate to save the Euro : Paradoxically, the crisis undermined the ECB's ordoliberal discourse "because some of its instruments, which it had to implement, deviated significantly from its principles. It then interpreted the paradigm with enough flexibly to adapt its original reputation to these new economic conditions. It was forced to do so as a last resort to save its one and only raison d'être: the euro. This Independent was thus obliged to be pragmatic by departing from the spirit of its statutes, which is unacceptable to the hardest supporters of ordoliberalism, which will lead to the resignation of the two German leaders present within the ECB: the governor of the Bundesbank, Jens WEIDMANN and the member of the executive board of the ECB, Jürgen STARK.

– Regulation of the financial system : The delegation of this new function to the ECB was carried out with great simplicity and with the consent of European leaders, because neither the Commission nor the Member States really wanted to obtain the monitoring of financial abuses throughout the area. In other words, in the event of a new financial crisis, the ECB would be the perfect scapegoat.

- Capturing exchange rate policy : The event that will most mark the definitive politicization of the ECB is, of course, the operation launched in January 2015: the quantitative easing (QE) operation. Indeed, the Euro is an overvalued currency on the world markets against the dollar and the euro zone is at risk of deflation. In addition, Member States find themselves heavily indebted, partly due to the rescue of their national banks. The ECB, as the guardian of the stability of the euro zone, is deciding to gradually buy back more than EUR 1 100 billion Member States' public debt. In this way, money is injected back into the economy, the euro depreciates significantly, prices rise, the risk of deflation is removed, and Member States reduce their debts. However, the ECB has just given itself the right to direct the exchange rate policy of the euro zone without this being granted by the Treaties or with the approval of European leaders, and without public opinion or the public arena being aware of this.

===== The arguments in favour of a counter power =====
In the aftermath of the euro area crisis, several proposals for a countervailing power were put forward, to deal with criticisms of a democratic deficit. For the German economist German Issing (2001) the ECB as a democratic responsibility and should be more transparent. According to him, this transparency could bring several advantages as the improvement of efficiency and credibility by giving the public adequate information. Others think that the ECB should have a closer relationship with the European Parliament which could play a major role in the evaluation of the democratic responsibility of the ECB. The development of new institutions or the creation of a minister is another solution proposed:

Towards democratic institutions ?

The absence of democratic institutions such as a Parliament or a real government is a regular criticism of the ECB in its management of the euro area, and many proposals have been made in this respect, particularly after the economic crisis, which would have shown the need to improve the governance of the euro area. For Moïse Sidiropoulos, a professor in economy: "The crisis in the euro zone came as no surprise, because the euro remains an unfinished currency, a stateless currency with a fragile political legitimacy".

French economist Thomas Piketty wrote on his blog in 2017 that it was essential to equip the eurozone with democratic institutions. An economic government could for example enable it to have a common budget, common taxes and borrowing and investment capacities. Such a government would then make the euro area more democratic and transparent by avoiding the opacity of a council such as the Eurogroup.

Nevertheless, according to him "there is no point in talking about a government of the eurozone if we do not say to which democratic body this government will be accountable", a real parliament of the eurozone to which a finance minister would be accountable seems to be the real priority for the economist, who also denounces the lack of action in this area.

The creation of a sub-committee within the current European Parliament was also mentioned, in the model of the Eurogroup, which is currently an under-formation of the ECOFIN Committee. This would require a simple amendment to the rules of procedure and would avoid a competitive situation between two separate parliamentary assemblies. The former President of the European Commission had, moreover, stated on this subject that he had "no sympathy for the idea of a specific Eurozone Parliament".

==== Debates on the role of central bank reserves in monetary policy ====
Paul de Grauwe and Yuemei Ji criticizes the prevailing role of central bank reserves in monetary policy. Due to past Quantitative Easing and refinancing operations (TLTROs), major central banks are currently operating in a regime of abundance of central bank reserves. As a result, when the ECB raised interest rates in response to the 2021–2023 inflation, it automatically led to a sharp increase in interest payments from the ECB to banks (while interest incomes from monetary portfolio remained stagnant leading to an unprecedented transfer of around 150 billions from the Eurosystem to commercial banks, which is nearly equivalent to the annual EU budget spending). Paul De Grauwe argues that these transfers lack economic rationale. Several Members of the European Parliament have also criticized the ECB for unduly boosting banks' profits.

==== Debates on the ECB's "Digital Euro" project ====
In November 2025, a group of large European banks publicly voiced resistance to the ECB's plan for a digital euro, arguing that it would duplicate existing payment infrastructures and incur excessive costs.

== See also ==
- European Banking Authority
- European Systemic Risk Board
- Open market operation
- Economic and Monetary Union
- Capital Markets Union
- European banking union
- List of central banks
- List of banks in Germany
- List of financial supervisory authorities by country
