= Priori =

Priori may refer to:

- Priori, members of the government of Renaissance Florence and other Italian cities, or Prioria, or Signoria, elected by picking eligible names out of a leather bag, or borse, -- at random, for a term of two months.
- A priori

== See also ==
- Priory, a monastery headed by a prior or prioress
