= A posteriori (disambiguation) =

A posteriori (Latin, 'from the later') is a term used in philosophy and epistemology.

A posteriori may refer to:

- A Posteriori, a 2006 music album by Enigma
- A posteriori knowledge, knowledge gained from empirical evidence
- A posteriori language, a type of constructed language
- A posteriori probability, a term with two uses in mathematics
- A posteriori (chess), a retrograde analysis convention

== See also ==
- A priori (disambiguation)
- Posterior (disambiguation)
- Ex post
- Ex post facto law
