= Yves Mersch =

Luxembourgish jurist and lawyer

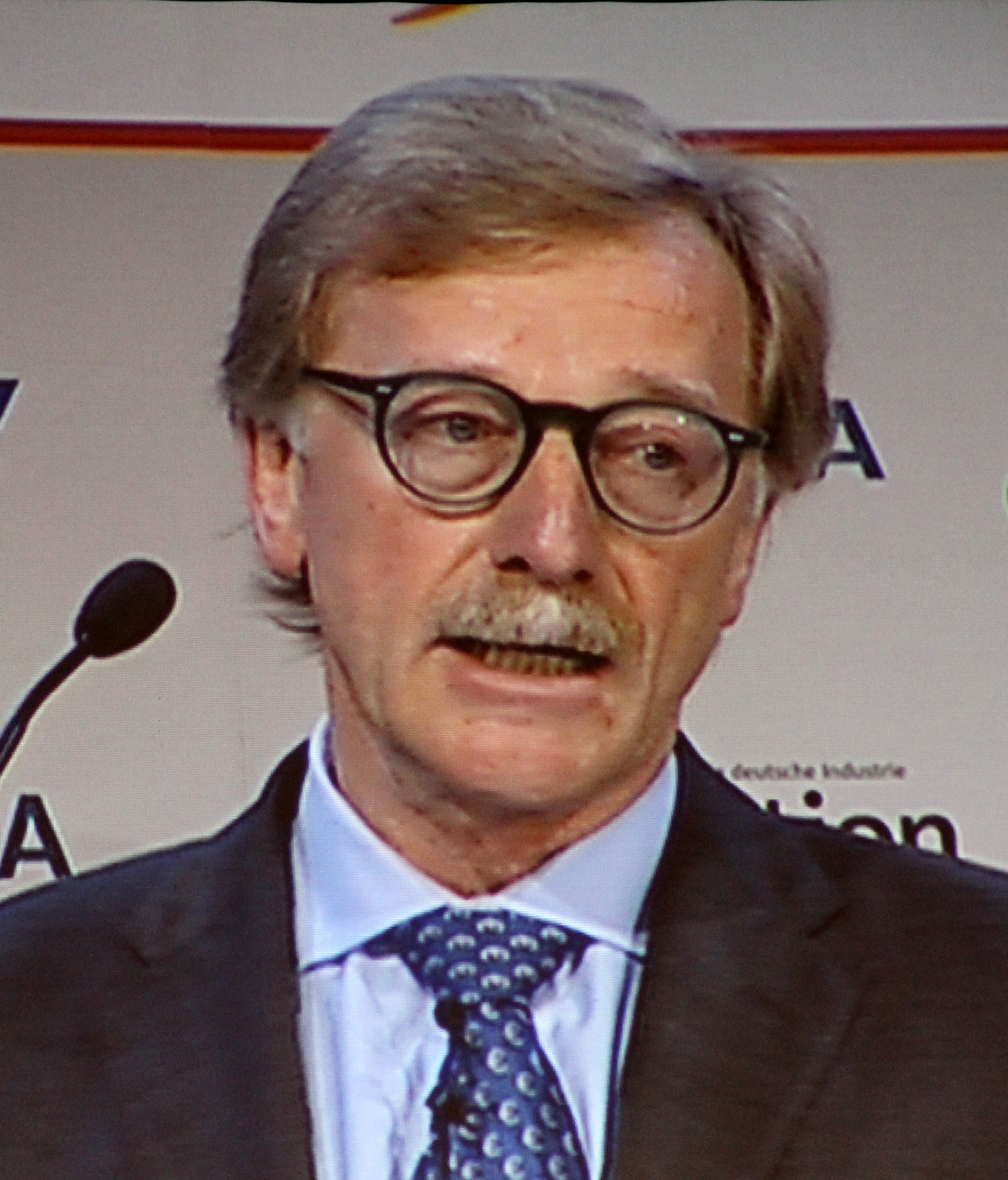

Member of the Executive Board of the European Central Bank
- In office 15 December 2012 – 14 December 2020
- Preceded by: José Manuel González-Paramo
- Succeeded by: Frank Elderson

Personal details
- Born: 1 October 1949 (age 75); Luxembourg City, Luxembourg
- Education: University of Paris 1 Pantheon-Sorbonne

Yves Mersch (born 1 October 1949 in Luxembourg City) is a Luxembourgish jurist and lawyer who served as a member of the Executive Board of the European Central Bank from 2012 to 2020. He previously served as first Governor of the Central Bank of Luxembourg from 1998 to 2012.

At his departure of the ECB in 2020, he was the longest ever serving member of the ECB's Governing council, and was also Vice Chair of the ECB Supervisory Board. Frank Elderson succeeded him.

== Early life and education ==
Mersch studied international law in Paris and is a member of the Luxembourgish bar. In 1973 he received his master's degree in Law from the University Paris 1 Panthéon-Sorbonne, in 1974 he finished his Postgraduate degree in International Public Law, Master of Political Science from the University Paris 1 Panthéon-Sorbonne, and in 1975 he earned his Postgraduate degree in Political Science, from the University Paris 1 Panthéon-Sorbonne.

== Career ==
Mersch served as assistant to the IMF’s Belgian executive director between 1976 and 1978 and later held a short-term position as financial counsellor at the Permanent Representation of Luxembourg in New York.

Between 1989 and 1998, Mersch served as Director of the Treasury and as personal representative in the Ministry of Finance for the negotiations leading to the Maastricht Treaty. He turned down an opportunity to run a European Commission Directorate-General under President Jacques Santer in 1995. He participated in the 1988 European Council meeting in Hannover that re-launched the monetary-union process.

In 2010, Mersch lost out against Vítor Constâncio who was appointed vice president of European Central Bank, for an eight-year mandate, in a banking supervision capacity.

=== European Central Bank, 2012–2020 ===
Mersch has been a member of the European Central Bank's Executive Board, succeeding José Manuel González Paramo, since December 2012. The Government of Spain under Prime Minister Mariano Rajoy had previously blocked Mersch’s appointment, instead putting forward ECB lawyer Antonio Sáinz de Vicuña for the role. The European Parliament had also opposed his appointment, arguing that the ECB board should contain at least one woman; the parliamentarians' refusal left the bank's executive board undermanned for six months.

The President of the European Central Bank, Jean-Claude Trichet, assigned Mersch to working jointly with Constâncio on the Eurozone banking union.

Since both Governors of National Central Banks and members of the Executive Board of the European Central Bank sit on its Governing Council, Mersch has been a member of the Governing Council since its beginnings.

== Public statements ==
On 19 March 2008, Mersch admonished banks for inappropriate risk management, but perhaps more unusually struck a doveish tone with regard to the future path of the European economy.

Mersch has been regarded as relatively hawkish on interest rate policy. While in May 2010 he voiced concerns over Jean-Claude Trichet’s unconditional debt-purchasing programme, he – unlike Jens Weidmann of Germany – supported Mario Draghi’s conditional plan to buy government bonds.

In late June, 2011, speaking while at the annual general meeting of the Bank for International Settlements in Basel, he said, "it is chaos," when asked what would happen if Greece were to default on its debts. He was described as "a key member" of the ECB Governing Council in the report.

== Other activities ==
=== International organizations ===
- European Bank for Reconstruction and Development (EBRD), Alternate Governor
- European Investment Bank (EIB), Member of the Management Committee
- Council of Europe Development Bank (CEB), Member of the Governing Board
- International Fund for Agricultural Development (IFAD), Governor
- Financial Stability Board, Elected Co-Chair of the Regional Consultative Group for Europe (2011–12)
- International Islamic Liquidity Management Corporation (IILM), Deputy Chair of the Governing Board (2010–12)

=== Non-profit organizations ===
- Institute for European Politics (IEP), Member of the Board of Trustees
- Fondation de la Banque centrale du Luxembourg (BCL’s Foundation), President (2011–12)
- Luxembourg School of Finance Foundation (FLSF), Member of the Board (2006–12)
- The Bridge Forum Dialogue a.s.b.l, President (2000–12)
- International Monetary Fund (IMF), Alternate Governor for Luxembourg on the Board of Governors(1998-2012)

== Personal life ==
Mersch is married to Malaysian economist Tengku Khatijah Ahmad and has two children. He was a competitive gymnast until the age of 45.

Government offices
Preceded by José Manuel González-Paramo	Member of the Executive Board of the European Central Bank; 2012–2020	Succeeded by Frank Elderson
