= Posterior =

Posterior may refer to:

- Posterior (anatomy), the end of an organism opposite to anterior
  - Buttocks, as a euphemism
- Posterior horn (disambiguation)
- Posterior probability, the conditional probability that is assigned when the relevant evidence is taken into account
- Posterior tense, a relative future tense
