= Frank Elderson =

Dutch lawyer (born 1970)

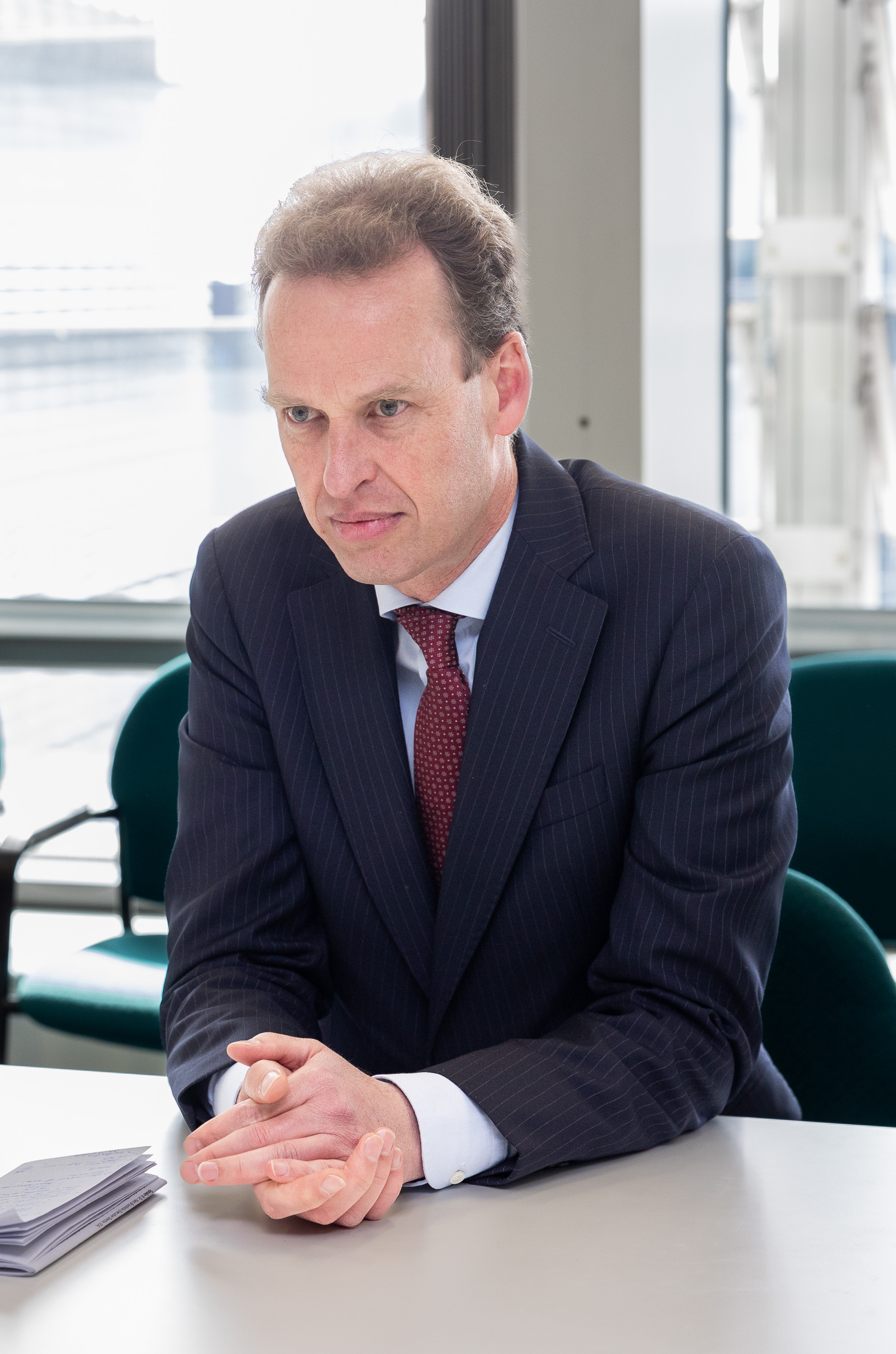

Member of the Executive Board of the European Central Bank
- Incumbent
- Assumed office 15 December 2020
- Preceded by: Yves Mersch

Personal details
- Born: 18 May 1970 (age 56) Utrecht, Netherlands
- Education: University of Amsterdam; Columbia University

Frank Elderson (born 18 May 1970 in Utrecht) is a Dutch lawyer who has been serving as a member of the Executive Board of the European Central Bank since 2020.

Before joining the ECB, Elderson has been an executive director of supervision at De Nederlandsche Bank since 1 July 2011, and was ex-officio member of the ECB Supervisory Board. Elderson played a key role in the creation of the Network for Greening the Financial System (NGFS) of which he is current chair.

== Education and career ==
Elderson completed the first year of the Dutch law university programme with honours in 1990 and studied at the University of Zaragoza, Spain, in 1993 and 1994. Elderson earned his degree in Dutch law at the University of Amsterdam in 1994.

In 1995, Elderson obtained an LLM degree from Columbia Law School, in the United States, and was sworn in as a lawyer in the Netherlands on the same year. Elderson subsequently started his professional career as a lawyer with Houthoff Advocaten & Notarissen.

=== Work at the Dutch central bank (1999–2020) ===
In 1999, Frank Elderson joined the Dutch National Bank (DNB) where he held various management positions in the Legal Services Division, as well as representing DNB on various working groups of the European System of Central Banks (ESCB). He was appointed Executive Director of Supervision in 2011, where he was responsible for supervision of banks, horizontal functions and integrity supervision, and legal affairs. In this capacity, he is also member of the Supervisory Board of the European Central Bank.

=== European Central Bank (2020–present) ===
In October 2020, he was proposed by the Dutch finance minister Wopke Hoekstra to succeed Yves Mersch as executive board member of the European Central Bank.

In competition with the Slovenian candidate Boštjan Jazbec, the Eurogroup approved Elderson's nomination. Despite concerns by MEPs over the lack of female members in the ECB's governing council, Elderson's nomination was eventually approved by the European Parliament's ECON Committee and by the plenary chamber of the European Parliament (by 319 votes in favour, 202 against and 171 abstentions). His appointment was subsequently confirmed by the European Council.

In December 2020, he was appointed by the Eurogroup as one of the six members of the Executive Board of the European Central Bank to succeed Yves Mersch Elderson officially became the Vice-chair of the ECB Supervisory Board in February 2021, and he was re-confirmed for this role in January 2026.

== Climate finance ==
Frank Elderson has been playing a leading role in the debate on the role of central banks for addressing climate change. In November 2024, he was listed by the Time magazine as one of the world’s most influential climate leaders.

Elderson's leadership on green finance started when he was director for financial stability at the Dutch National Bank. In 2016, he founded and chaired the Sustainable Finance Platform, a forum hosted by the Dutch national bank gathering central bankers, government officials and civils society groups.

In 2017, Elderson was appointed first chair of the Network for Greening the Financial System, a forum launched by 8 central banks (including the DNB) and financial authorities at the “One Planet Summit” in December 2017. The NGFS aims to "help strengthening the global response required to meet the goals of the Paris agreement and to enhance the role of the financial system to manage risks and to mobilize capital for green and low-carbon investments in the broader context of environmentally sustainable development. To this end, the Network defines and promotes best practices to be implemented within and outside of the Membership of the NGFS and conducts or commissions analytical work on green finance."

Since its creation, the NGFS has since grown its membership to 89 members, and include the IMF and the Bank for International Settlements as observers, and the US Federal Reserve. Elderson was re-appointed chair for another two years term in September 2020.

== Personal life ==
Elderson is married and has two daughters.

Government offices
Preceded by Yves Mersch	Member of the Executive Board of the European Central Bank; 2020–present	Incumbent
