= Anterior horn =

The term anterior horn (also frontal horn, anterior cornu, frontal cornu) may refer to either of two separate anatomical structures within the central nervous system:

- anterior horn of lateral ventricle in the brain, which passes forward, laterally, and slightly downward from the interventricular foramen into the frontal lobe
- anterior horn of spinal cord, the ventral (front) grey matter section of the spinal cord which contains motor neurons that affect the skeletal muscles

== See also ==
- Posterior horn (disambiguation)
