= A priori (disambiguation) =

A priori (Latin, 'from the earlier') is a term used in philosophy and epistemology.

A priori or apriori may also refer to:

- A priori language, a type of constructed language
- A priori estimate, in the theory of partial differential equations
- A priori probability, a probability derived by deductive reasoning
- Apriori algorithm, an algorithm used with databases
- aPriori Capital Partners, a private equity investment firm

== See also ==
- A posteriori (disambiguation)
- Priory, a monastery headed by a prior or prioress
- Ex-ante, a Latin phrase meaning 'before the event'
