= Ex-ante =

Latin for "before the event"

The term ex-ante (sometimes written ex ante or exante) is a New Latin phrase meaning "before the event".

In economics, ex-ante or notional demand refers to the desire for goods and services that is not backed by the ability to pay for those goods and services. This is also termed as 'wants of people'.

Ex-ante is used most commonly in the commercial world, where results of a particular action, or series of actions, are forecast (or intended). The opposite of ex-ante is ex-post (actual) (or ex post). Buying a lottery ticket loses you money ex ante (in expectation), but if you win, it was the right decision ex post.

== Examples ==
=== Finance ===
- In the financial world, the ex-ante return is the expected return of an investment portfolio.
- In the recruitment industry, ex-ante is often used when forecasting resource requirements on large future projects.

The ex-ante (and ex-post) reasoning in economic topics was introduced mainly by Swedish economist Gunnar Myrdal in his 1927–39 work on monetary theory, who described it in this way:

An important distinction exists between prospective and retrospective methods of calculating economic quantities such as incomes, savings, and investments; and [...] a corresponding distinction of great theoretical importance must be drawn between two alternative methods of defining these quantities. Quantities defined in terms of measurements made at the end of the period in question are referred to as ex post; quantities defined in terms of action planned at the beginning of the period in question are referred to as ex ante.)

Focusing attention on the relation between saving and investment, Myrdal argued that one may without any contradiction consider that, as they are made by separate agents, ex ante saving and investment decisions are not at parity in general while ex post saving and investment are recorded in bookkeeping balance exactly:

There is in fact no contradiction at all between the statement of an exact bookkeeping balance ex post and the obvious inference that in a situation when saving is increasing without a corresponding increase of investment, or perhaps with an adverse movement in investment, there must be a tendency ex ante to a disparity. (Gunnar Myrdal, Monetary Equilibrium, London : W. Hodge 1939: 46)

This analysis has become a standard tool in macroeconomics.

Prices are quantities that directly refer to a point of time: they are determined at a point of time, after an ex ante adjustment process has taken place. As for the macroeconomic quantities, Myrdal proposed to refer to the point of time at which they are calculated.

Gunnar Myrdal further explained that ex ante disparity and ex post balance are made consistent through price changes, which result from the behavior of economic agents, which is based on ex ante anticipations:

For these anticipations determine the behaviour of the economic subjects and consequently those changes in the whole price system which during a period actually occur as a result of the actions of individuals. (Gunnar Myrdal, Monetary Equilibrium, London : W. Hodge 1939: 121)

In the context of ex-ante, the Swedish economist Myrdal also dealt with the question of the unit of time, which he proposed to solve by reducing the actual time-dimension of macroeconomic variables such as income, saving and investment to a point of time:

Some of these quantities refer directly to a point of time. That is true of "capital value" as also of such quantities as demand and supply prices. Other terms – as e.g. "income", "revenue", "return", "expenses", "savings", "investments" – imply, however, a time period for which they are reckoned. But in order to be unambiguous they must also refer to a point of time at which they are calculated. (Gunnar Myrdal, Monetary Equilibrium, London : W. Hodge 1939: 46–7)

Economist G. L. S. Shackle claimed the importance of Gunnar Myrdal´s analysis by which saving and investment are allowed to adjust ex ante to each other. However, the reference to ex ante and ex post analysis has become so usual in modern macroeconomics that the position of John Maynard Keynes to not include it in his work was currently considered as an oddity, if not a mistake. As Shackle put it:

Myrdalian ex ante language would have saved the General Theory from describing the flow of investment and the flow of saving as identically, tautologically equal, and within the same discourse, treating their equality as a condition which may, or not, be fulfilled. (Shackle, G.L.S. (1989) "What did the General Theory do?", in J. Pheby (ed), New Directions in Post-keynesian Economics, Aldershot: Edward Elgar.)

=== European Union law ===
In European Union law, ex ante regulation is a type of regulation that is designed to prevent companies engaging in harmful conduct. It is usually used in sectors where there is anti-competitive behavior. For example, such regulations are used in the telecommunications sector as well as in relation to data protection (the General Data Protection Regulation is an ex-ante regulation)

== See also ==
- A priori
- List of Latin phrases
- Ex post facto law
