= Posterior horn =

The term posterior horn (also dorsal horn, posterior cornu, dorsal cornu) may refer to:

- Posterior horn of lateral ventricle in the brain, which passes forward, laterally and slightly downward, from the corpus callosum into the occipital lobe
- Posterior horn of spinal cord, the dorsal (towards the back) grey matter section of the spinal cord that receives several types of sensory information from the body including light touch, proprioception, and vibration
- Posterior horn of the thyroid (or, Zuckerkandl's tubercle), a pyramidal extension of the thyroid gland

== See also ==
- Anterior horn (disambiguation)
