= Bank of Finland =

Central Bank of Finland

Coordinates: 60.17121°N 24.95246°E

Bank of Finland Suomen Pankki (in Finnish) Finlands Bank (in Swedish)

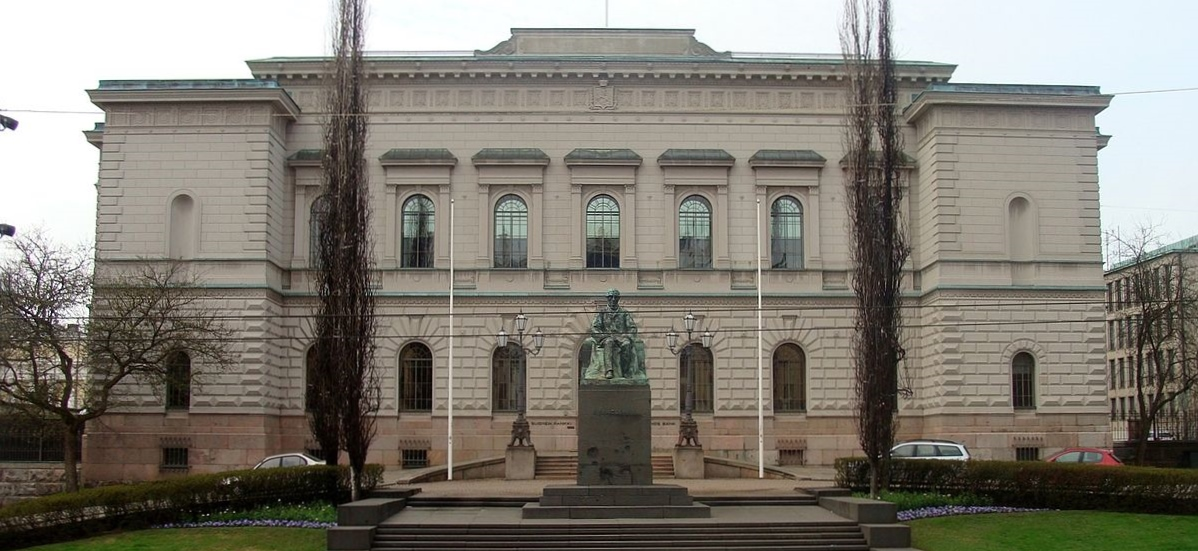
- Central bank of: Finland
- Headquarters: Helsinki
- Established: 1 March 1812
- Ownership: 100% state ownership
- Governor: Olli Rehn
- Reserves: 6 230 million USD
- Succeeded by: European Central Bank (1999)^{1}
- Website: suomenpankki.fi/en
- ^{1} The Bank of Finland still exists but many functions have been taken over by the ECB.

The Bank of Finland (Finnish: Suomen Pankki, Swedish: Finlands Bank) is the national central bank for Finland within the Eurosystem. It was the Finnish central bank from 1865 to 1998, issuing the markka. It views itself as the fourth oldest surviving central bank in the world, after Sweden's Riksbank, the Bank of England, and the Bank of France, having been originally created in 1811-1812 as the Office of Exchange, Lending, and Deposits of the Grand Duchy of Finland (Finnish: Waihetus-, Laina- ja Depositioni-Contori Suomen Suuren-ruhtinaanmaassa) before taking its current name in 1840. Unlike many other longstanding central banks, it has always been government-owned.

The Bank of Finland is not itself a financial supervisory authority, but participates in European banking supervision as a member of the Supervisory Board of the European Central Bank. It is also a member of the European Systemic Risk Board (ESRB).

== History ==
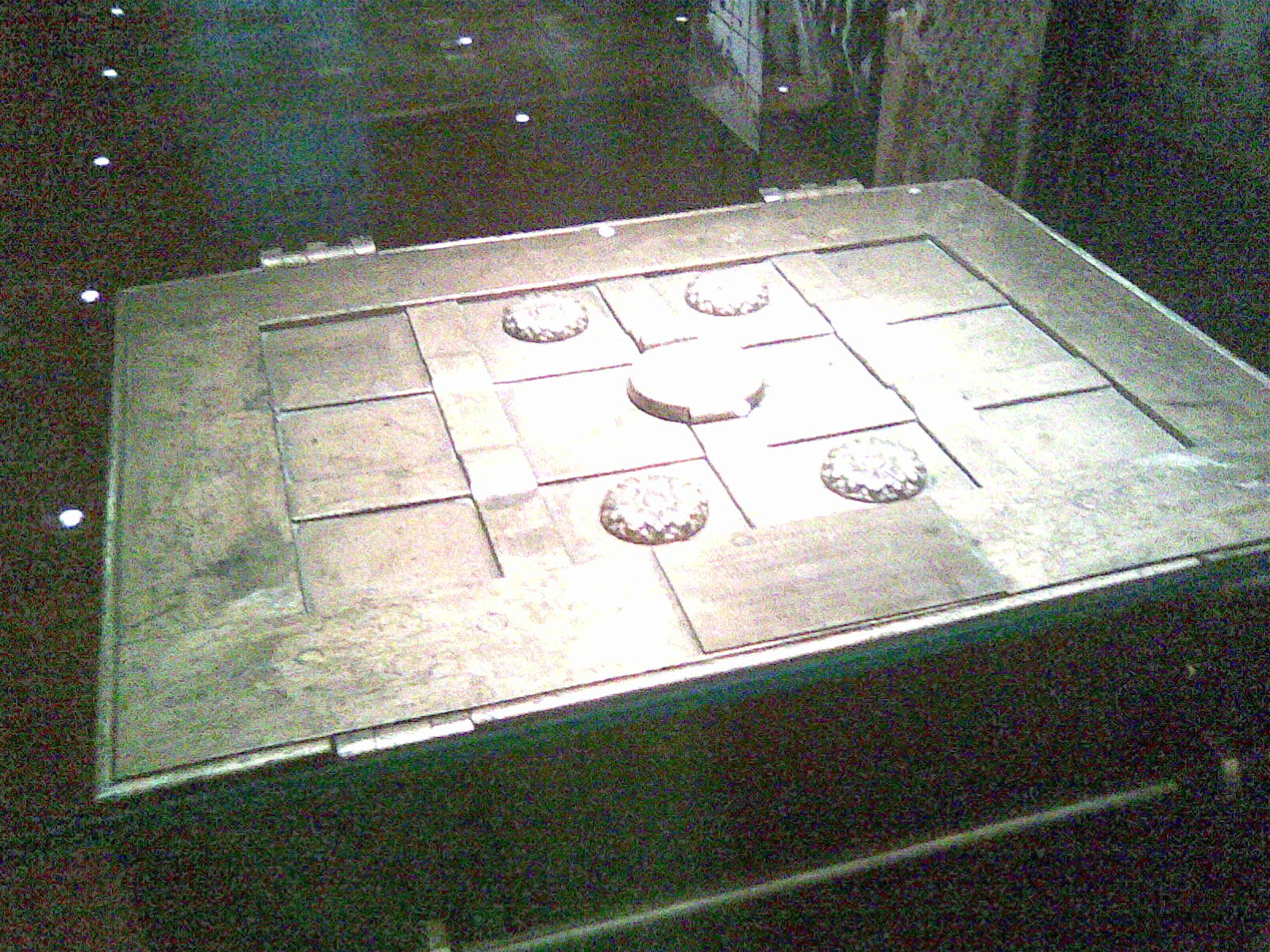
Bank of Finland strong box which moved to Helsinki with the bank when it relocated from Turku

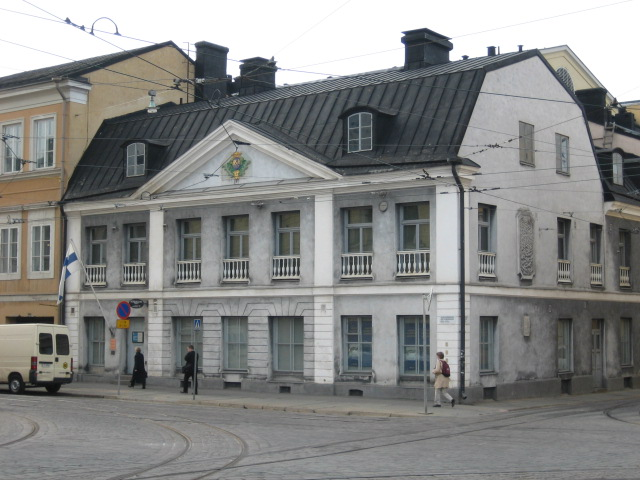
Sederholm House in Helsinki, the Bank's seat from 1819 to 1824

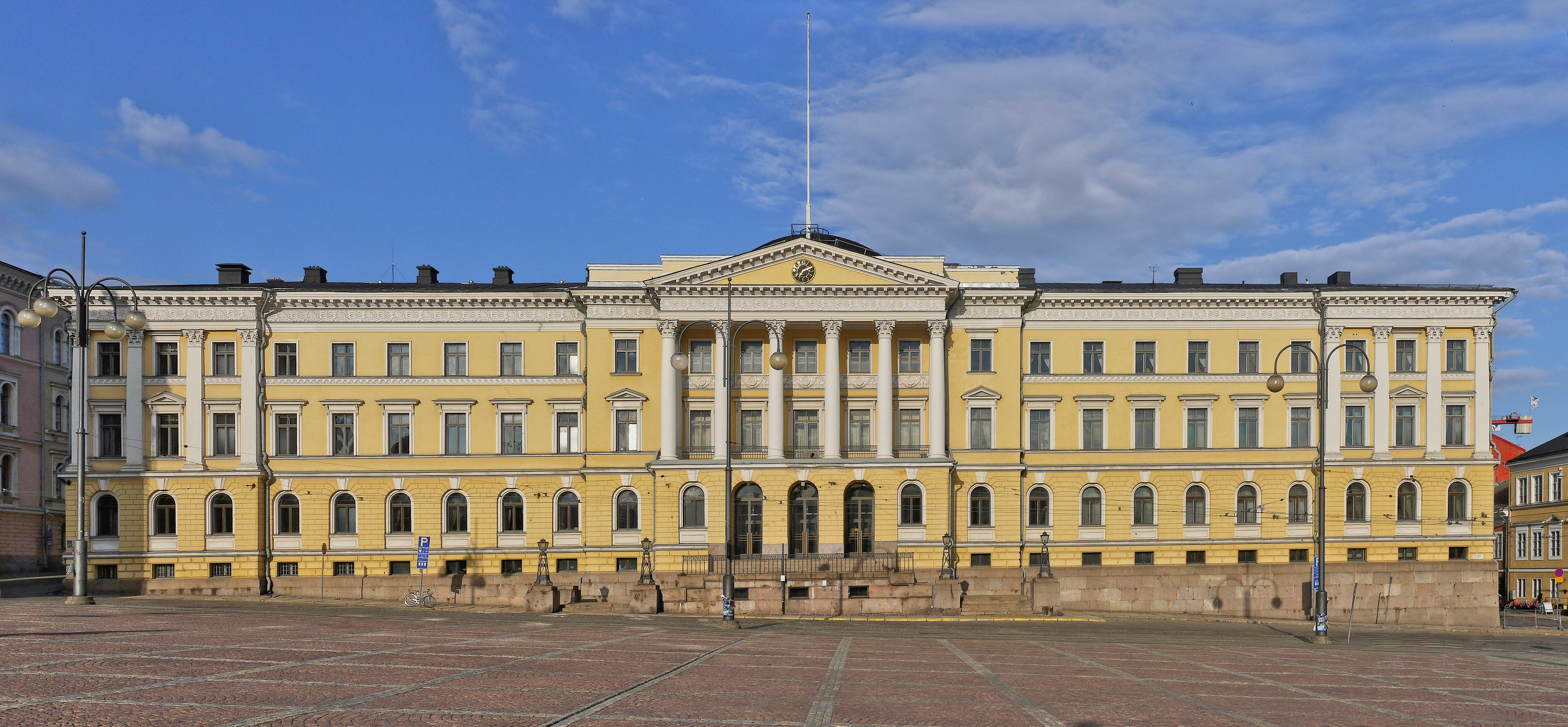
Government Palace in Helsinki, the Bank's home from 1824 until relocation to its current building in 1883

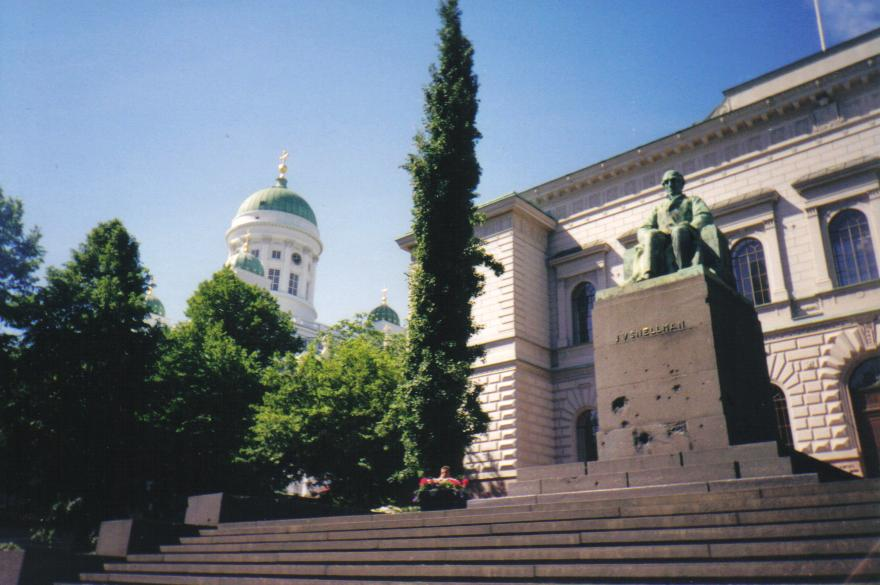
The Bank's current head office completed in 1883, with statue of J.V. Snellman by sculptor Emil Wikström in front

=== Russian Empire ===
In 1809, the Russian Empire annexed Finland and made it a Grand Duchy with its own administrative structure. One aim of the new authorities was to sever Finland's previous economic integration with Sweden, including the use of the Swedish riksdaler as currency. To that effect, the Office of Exchange, Lending, and Deposits was chartered on 12 December 1811 and established on 1 March 1812 in Turku by Alexander I of Russia, partly modeled on the Bank of Sweden. It started operations in August 1812. It was owned and controlled by the Grand Duchy's government, but from the start had its own capital and balance sheet. The Grand Duchy government was usually in surplus and did not use the Office to finance itself, allowing it to extend credit to the Finnish economy instead. It issued banknotes denominated in rubles and kopecks and provided credit to local landowners and merchants. Its design was inspired by Russian Secretary of State Mikhail Speransky, whose plans to create a similar institution for Russia itself were thwarted by the French invasion of Russia in mid-1812.

In 1819 the institution relocated to Helsinki. Its efforts to displace the Swedish currency were only partly successful, however, until both Sweden (in 1834) and Russia (in 1839) returned to the silver standard. In 1840, the remaining riksdaler banknotes in Finland were withdrawn from circulation and substituted by rubles, and the withdrawn riksdaler notes were exchanged for silver at the Riksbank in Stockholm. This allowed the Bank of Finland (which took that name in 1840) to accumulate a significant metallic reserve, start discounting bills of exchange, and generally become much larger and more liquid in the 1840s, in contrast to the Russian State Commercial Bank and other Russian public banks of the time. The Bank soon opened its first branches in Turku and Vaasa. From then on, Russian currency-denominated notes became the dominant means of payment in the Grand Duchy, and the Bank of Finland's banknotes represented less than one percent of all banknotes circulating in the Russian Empire, thus Finland had effectively no monetary autonomy. Consequently, Finland suffered from the Russian monetary disorder associated with the Crimean War and its financially disastrous aftermath. The convertibility of its banknotes to silver was again restricted from April 1854.

Requests for greater protection from Russian monetary vagaries developed in parallel with the Russian efforts at monetary stabilization, including the establishment of the State Bank of the Russian Empire in 1860 and subsequent reforms initiated by finance minister Michael von Reutern. On 4 April 1860, Alexander II authorized the Bank of Finland to issue its own denomination, the Finnish markka, defined as a quarter of the Russian paper ruble (and thus nearly equal in value with the French franc at the time). In 1865, the Bank of Finland finally secured monetary policy autonomy when Finnish Senator Johan Vilhelm Snellman obtained from Alexander the right to keep the markka linked to the silver standard irrespective of the ruble's situation, which was implemented in March 1866. From then on, the Bank of Finland effectively set its own monetary policy, making the Grand Duchy a separate currency zone from the rest of the Russian Empire, with the markka fluctuating in the range of 2.79 to 3.60 to the ruble between 1866 and 1875.

In 1868, the ownership and oversight of the Bank was transferred from Finland's executive Senate to its recently revived legislative Diet (from 1906, the Parliament of Finland), thus strengthening its independence and accountability along the lines adopted by Sweden. To reflect the Bank's new institutional position, plans were made to move it away from its location in the southern wing of the Senate Building in central Helsinki. The bank purchased a nearby plot of land in 1875 and held a design competition in 1876, which was won by Balto-German architect Ludwig Bohnstedt. The new building's construction started in 1878 and was completed in 1883.

In 1876, Alexander II assented to Finland's shift from silver to the gold standard. This was implemented in July 1878, when the Bank of Finland unilaterally joined the Latin Monetary Union, a stance it kept until the outbreak of World War I. Meanwhile, the Russo-Turkish War had again plunged Russia into monetary turmoil, and the ruble remained only partly convertible into markka (coins in small quantities). Even after Russia joined the gold standard in 1897, an imperial decree issued in 1904 restored the legal tender status of Russian ruble gold coins in Finland, but was never implemented because of the Russo-Japanese War.

=== Independent Finland ===
Shortly after the independence of Finland in late 1917, the civil war erupted. The Red Guards occupied the Bank of Finland's head office together with other strategic points of Helsinki in late January 1918 and secured control of the printing presses. The bank's professional staff refused to obey them, however, and the gold reserves had been precautionarily removed to the branch in Kuopio in Northern Finland; The Reds tried to seize the reserves in Kuopio by force in early February, but withdrew after a weeklong battle.

Red leader Anton Huotari became the chair of the Executive Board in Helsinki, in competition to governor Clas von Collan, who remained in Stockholm during the civil war, and the other Executive Board members who stayed with the White government in Vaasa. The White side remained in control of the gold reserves, half of the branch network in Finland, and foreign assets, but suffered from a cash shortage as it had no capacity to print banknotes. The German troops fighting the Battle of Helsinki eventually retook control of the head office on 13 April 1918, and the Bank of Finland reopened for business on 22 April 1918.

After these dramatic events, the Bank of Finland kept facing high inflation, but eventually managed to stabilize the markka in 1923 at about ten percent of its prewar gold value. It returned to the gold standard in 1926, but floated again in the wake the European banking crisis of 1931. In the spring of 1933, it pegged the markka to the pound sterling. During the interwar period, the Bank acquired great prestige in the new country, linked to the leadership of its longstanding governor Risto Ryti who became Prime Minister of Finland in December 1939 and President a year later in the midst of the Interim Peace.

The Bank's head office building was damaged by Soviet bombing during the Continuation War air raids of 1944. After World War II and a renewed inflationary episode until the early 1950s, the Bank of Finland managed the country's regime of financial repression, then liberalization in the 1980s. The markka was devalued on multiple occasions until finally floating in September 1992.

New practices and technologies led the Bank of Finland to phase out its local branch network, starting with closing the Hämeenlinna branch in 1963. In the years 1991–1994, eight other branches were closed, leaving only Turku, Tampere, Kuopio, Oulu and Vantaa in operation. The Turku branch was closed in 2007, those in Tampere and Kuopio in 2012, and the Oulu branch in 2019.

Following the 1990s Finnish banking crisis, financial supervision was reorganized in Finland with the creation of the Rahoitustarkastus (Rata) in 1993, an independent banking supervisor which is part of the Bank of Finland albeit with its own separate governance. In 2009, the Finnish Financial Supervisory Authority was formed by merging Rata with the previously separate insurance supervisor.

At the start of Economic and Monetary Union, Bank of Finland Governor Sirkka Hämäläinen joined the inaugural Executive Board of the European Central Bank on 1 June 1998, becoming its first female member.

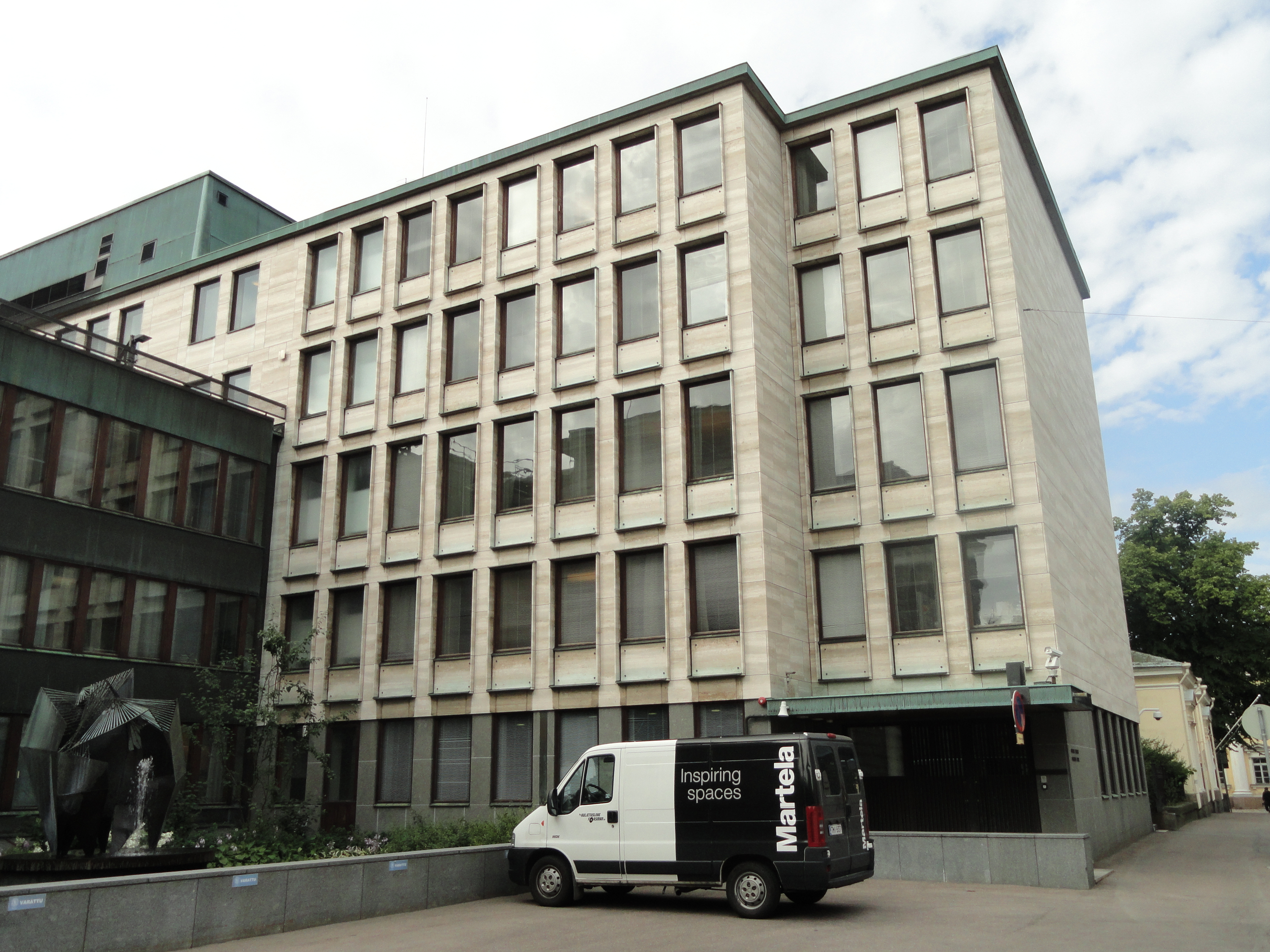
Helsinki head office extension designed by Harry W. Schreck in the late 1950s

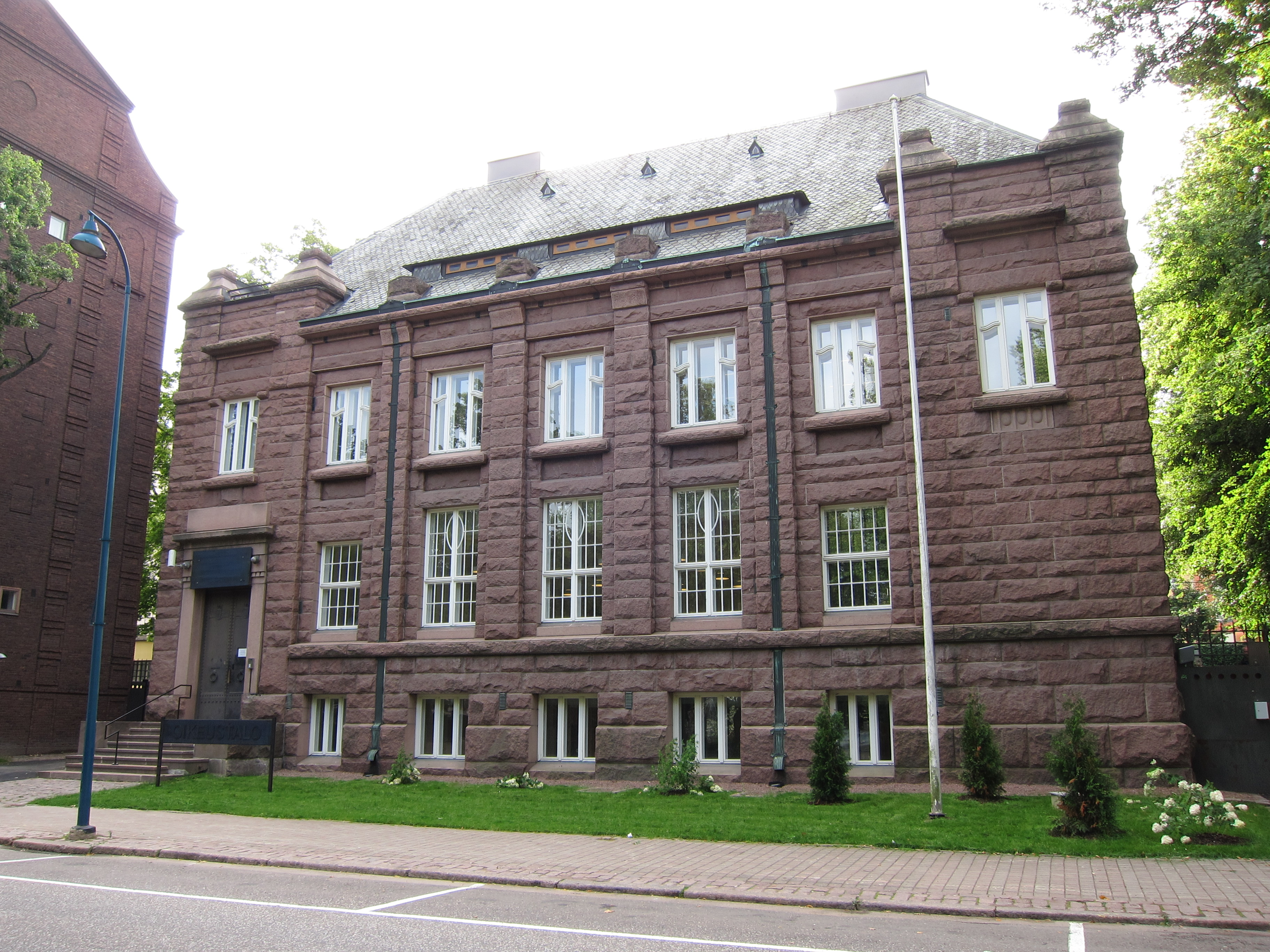
Former branch in Kotka

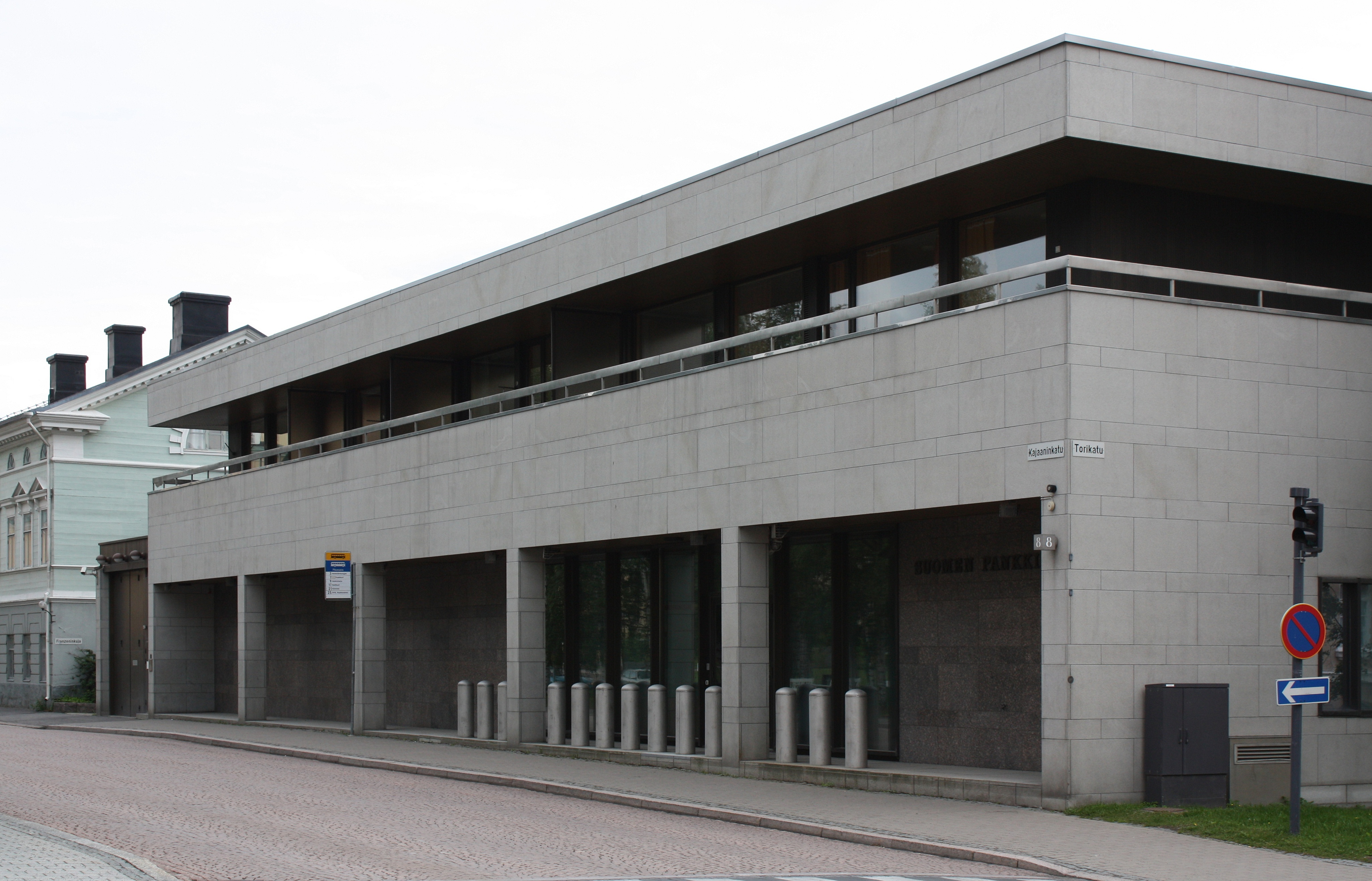
Former branch in Oulu

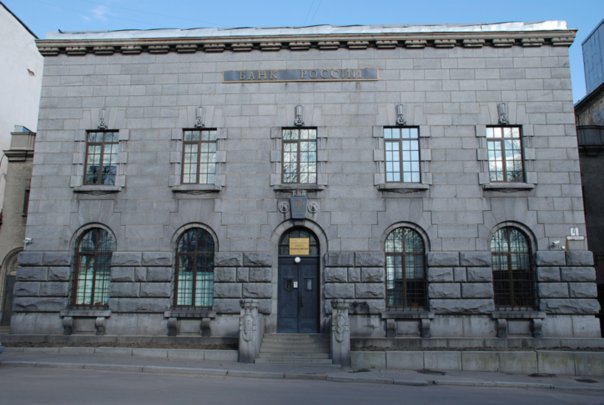
Former branch in Sortavala, now in Russia

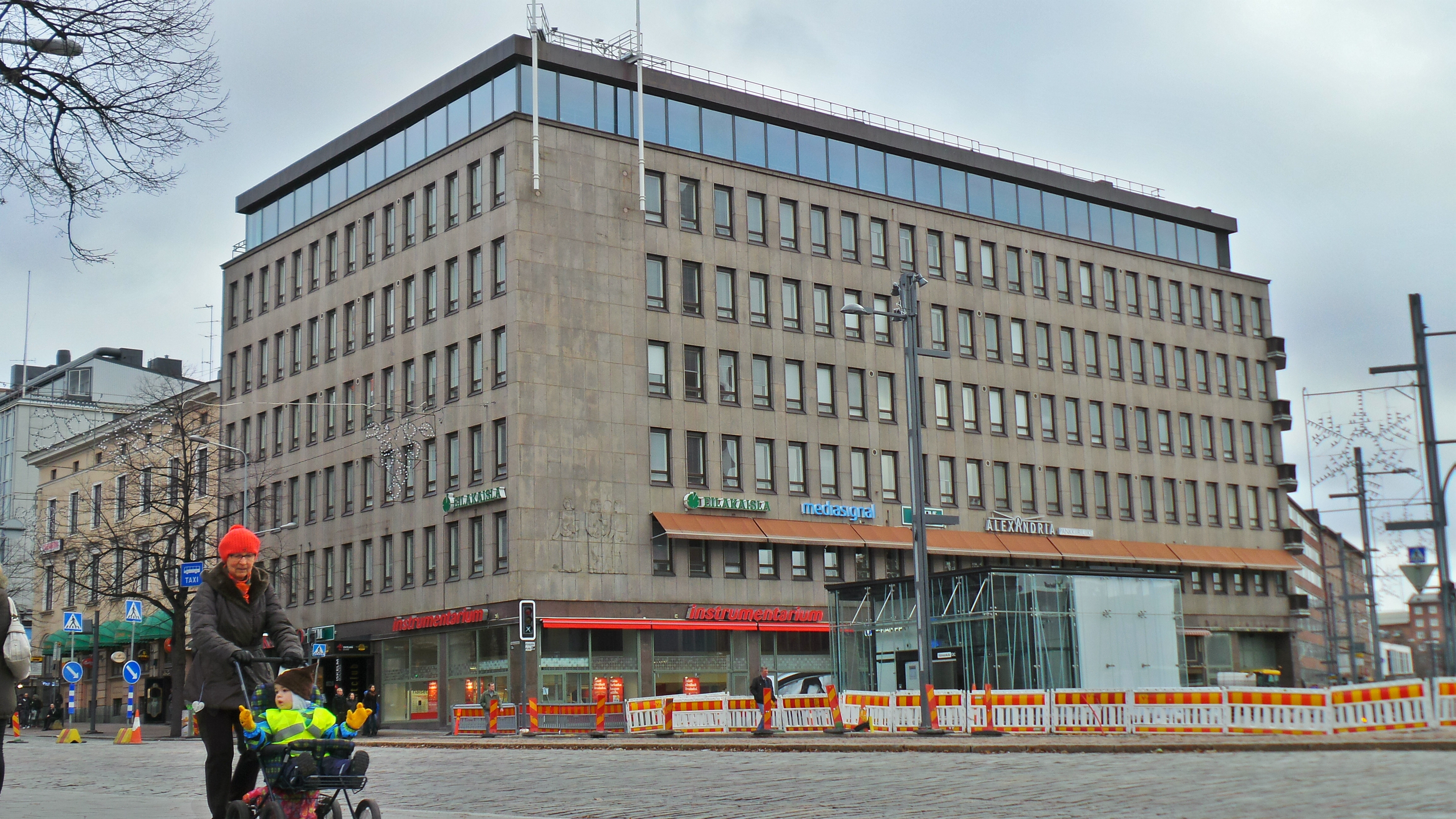
Former branch in Tampere

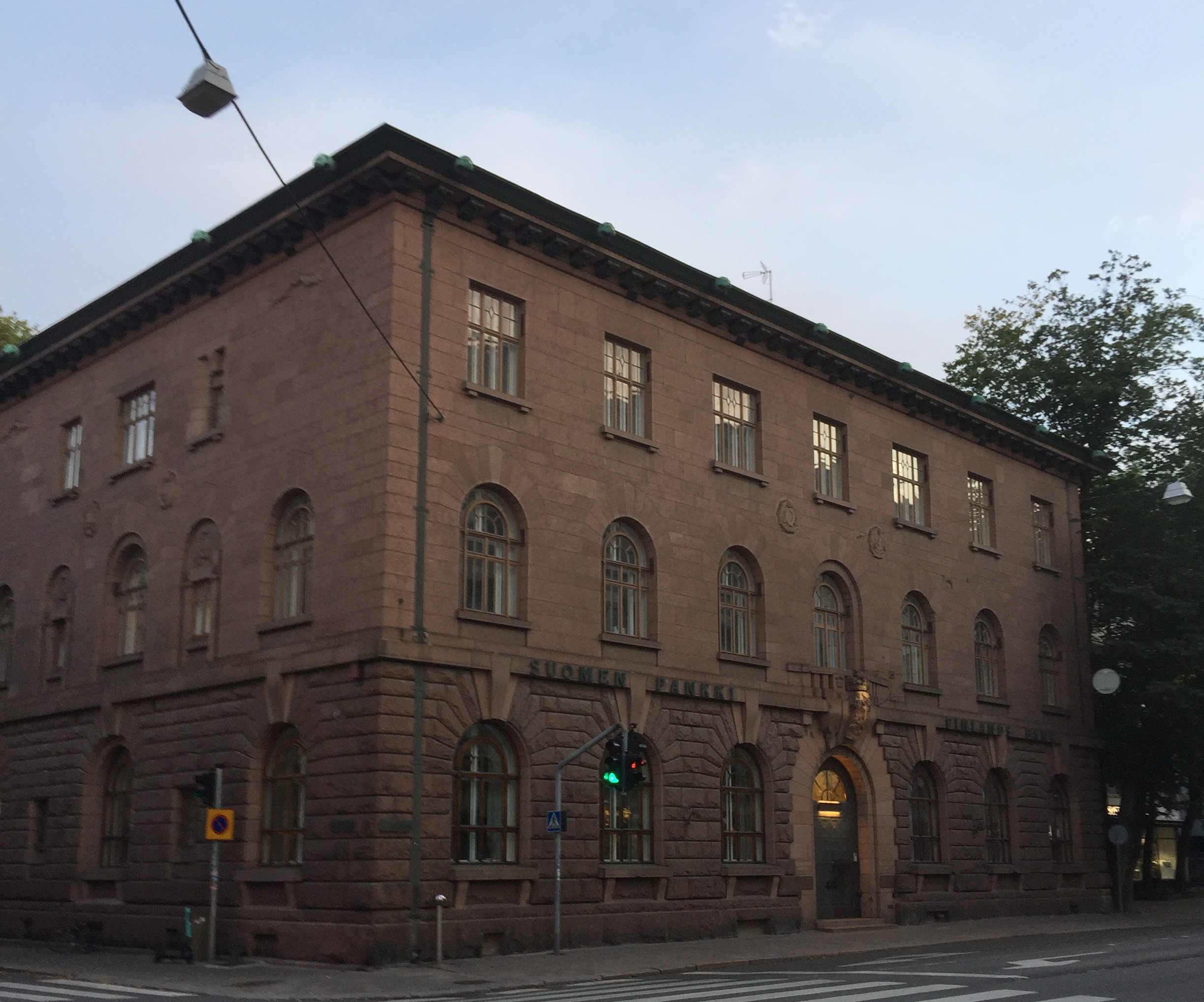
Former branch in Turku

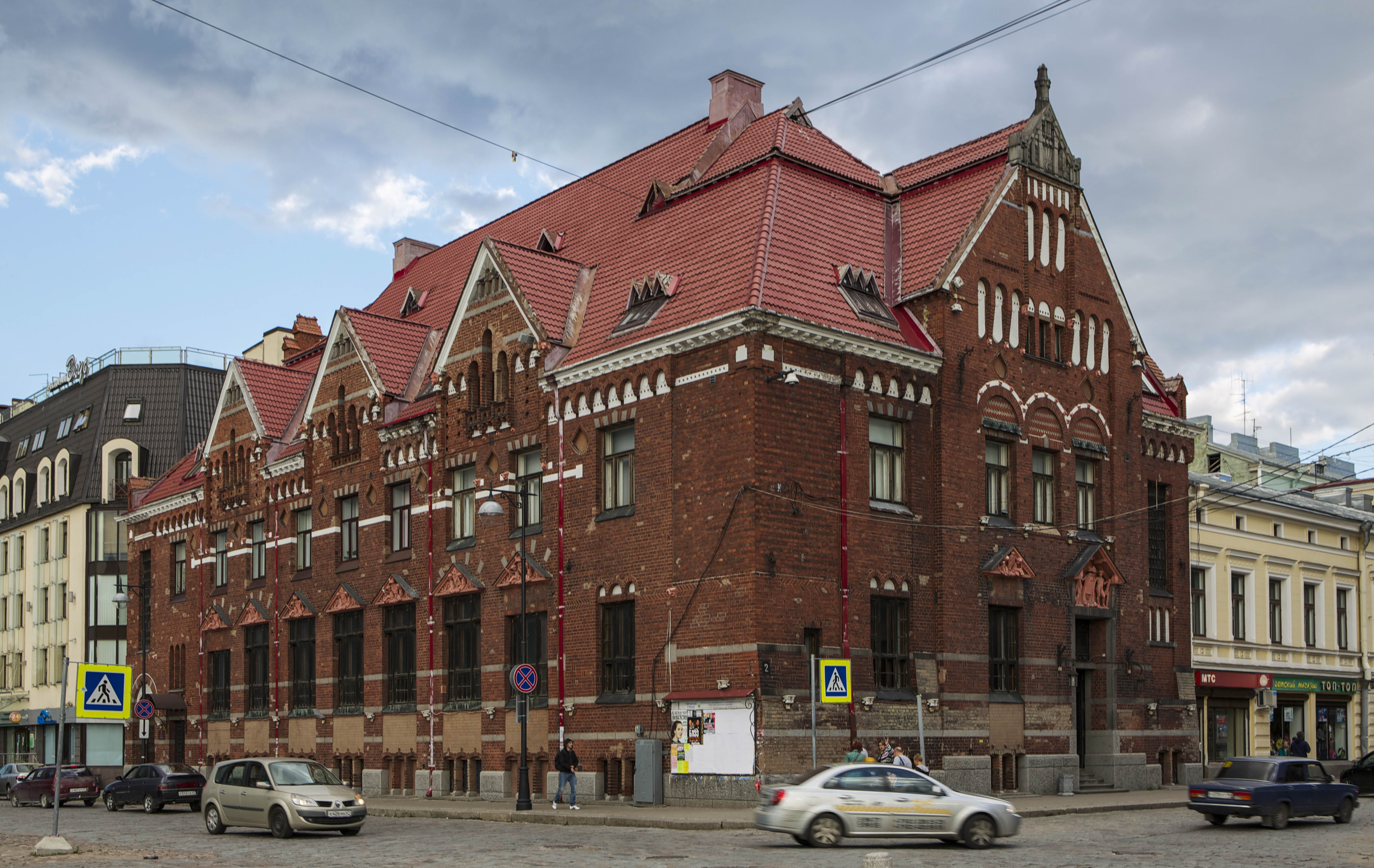
Former branch in Viipuri, now Vyborg, Russia

== Mandate, ownership and organization ==
The Bank of Finland is Finland's central bank and a member of the European System of Central Banks and of the Eurosystem. It is Finland's monetary authority, and is responsible for the country's currency supply and foreign exchange reserves.

The Bank of Finland is owned by the Republic of Finland, and governed by the Finnish Parliament through the Parliamentary Supervisory Council and the Board of the bank. The Board is responsible for the administration of the bank, and the Parliamentary Supervisory Council for supervising the administration and activities of the bank and for other statutory tasks. The bank is governed under the provisions of the Act on the Bank of Finland, passed in 1998.

The bank had a staff of about 380 persons in 2017.

The highest official in the bank is the Governor who also chairs the board. Members of the Board in August 2018 were Olli Rehn (Governor), Marja Nykänen (Deputy Governor) and Tuomas Välimäki.

== The Bank of Finland Institute for Emerging Economies ==
The Bank of Finland Institute for Emerging Economies (BOFIT) is the Bank of Finland's research institute specializing in emerging economies, focusing mainly on monitoring and analyzing the economic development in Russia and China and conducting related academic research. It was created in 1991, and derives its name from the Bank of Finland (BOF) and the Finnish name idäntutkimus (IT) meaning Eastern Studies.

== Leadership ==
=== Governors ===
- Claes Johan Edelsköld 1812–1816
- Carl Johan Idestam 1817–1820
- Otto Herman Lode 1820–1827
- Johan Gustaf Winter 1827–1841
- Carl Wilhelm Trapp 1841–1853
- Axel Ludvig Born 1853–1856
- Alex Federley 1853–1854
- Robert von Trapp 1854–1856
- Frans Ivar Edelheim 1856–1858
- Wilhelm Blidberg 1858–1861
- Carl Isak Björkman 1862–1866
- Victor von Haartman 1866–1870
- August Florin 1870–1875
- Gösta von Troil 1875–1884
- Gustaf Robert Alfred Charpentier 1884–1897
- Theodor Wegelius 1898–1906
- Clas von Collan 1907–1918
- Otto Stenroth 1918–1923
- August Ramsay 1923–1924
- Risto Ryti 1923–1940
- Johan Wilhelm Rangell 1943–1944
- Risto Ryti 1944–1945
- Sakari Tuomioja 1945–1955
- Rainer von Fieandt 1955–1957
- Klaus Waris 1957–1967
- Mauno Koivisto 1968–1982
- Ahti Karjalainen 1982–1983
- Rolf Kullberg 1983–1992
- Sirkka Hämäläinen 1992–1998
- Matti Vanhala 1998–2004 (retired early due to illness)
- Erkki Liikanen 2004–2018
- Olli Rehn 2018–

=== Chairs of the Parliamentary Supervisory Council ===
- Erik von Frenckell
- Juho Niukkanen
- Veikko Kokkola
- Juha Rihtniemi (−1971)
- Harri Holkeri (1971–1979)
- Matti Jaatinen (1979–1987)
- Mauri Miettinen (1987–1990)
- Erkki Pystynen (1990–1991)
- Pentti Mäki-Hakola (1991–1995)
- Sauli Niinistö (1995)
- Ilkka Kanerva (1995–2003)
- Mauri Pekkarinen (2003)
- Olavi Ala-Nissilä (2003–2006)
- Mari Kiviniemi (2006–2007)
- Seppo Kääriäinen (2007–2008)
- Timo Kalli (2008–2011)
- Ben Zyskowicz (2011–2015)
- Matti Vanhanen (2015–2019)
- Antti Lindtman (2019–present)

== See also ==
- Economy of Finland
- Finnish Financial Supervisory Authority
- List of central banks
