= Matti Vanhala =

Finnish economist

Governor of the Bank of Finland
- In office 1998–2004

Personal details
- Born: 31 January 1946 Helsinki, Finland
- Died: 29 September 2004 (aged 58)
- Occupation: economist

Erkki Matti Vanhala (born 31 January 1946 in Helsinki, died 29 September 2004) was an influential Finnish economist. He was Governor of the Bank of Finland from June 1998 until July 2004.

Vanhala graduated in political science. He worked from 1968 to 1970 in the Ministry of Finance, and started as a researcher in the Bank of Finland in 1970. In 1998 he succeeded Sirkka Hämäläinen as the Governor of Bank of Finland and also as a member of the Governing Council of the European Central Bank.

In 1999 he was diagnosed with bladder cancer. He was twice on leave due to the prolonged illness. He retired in July 2004.

Matti Vanhala died on 29 September 2004 after a long illness.

Government offices
Preceded by Sirkka Hämäläinen	Governor of the Bank of Finland; 1998-2004	Succeeded by Erkki Liikanen
