= List of deputy finance ministers of Germany =

This is a list of deputy finance ministers of Germany, who since 1967 come in two types: the Parliamentary State Secretaries (German: Parlamentarische Staatssekretäre), appointed by the parliament, and the Civil Service State Secretary (Beamtete Staatssekretäre), who have civil service status.

== Deputy Finance Ministers ==
=== Parliamentary State Secretaries ===
- 1967–1969: Albert Leicht (CDU)
- 1969–1971: Gerhard Reischl (SPD)
- 1971–1974: Hans Hermsdorf (SPD)
- 1972–1974: Konrad Porzner (SPD)
- 1974–1982: Karl Haehser (SPD)
- 1975–1978: Rainer Offergeld (SPD)
- 1978–1982: Rolf Böhme (SPD)
- 1982: Gunter Huonker (SPD)
- 1982–1989: Hansjörg Häfele (CDU)
- 1982–1990: Friedrich Voss (CSU)
- 1989–1993: Manfred Carstens (CDU)
- 1990–1994: Joachim Grünewald (CDU)
- 1993–1994: Jürgen Echternach (CDU)
- 1994–1998: Irmgard Karwatzki (CDU)
- 1994–1995: Kurt Faltlhauser (CSU)
- 1995–1998: Hansgeorg Hauser (CSU)
- 1998–2007: Barbara Hendricks (SPD)
- 1998–2009: Karl Diller (SPD)
- 2007–2009: Nicolette Kressl (SPD)
- since 2009: Steffen Kampeter (CDU)
- since 2009: Hartmut Koschyk (CSU)

=== Civil Service State Secretaries ===
- 1949–1959: Alfred Hartmann
- 1959–1962: Karl Maria Hettlage
- 1963–1969: Walter Grund
- 1967–1969: Karl Maria Hettlage
- 1969–1972: Hans Georg Emde (FDP)
- 1970–1972: Heinz Haller
- 1973–1977: Karl Otto Pöhl
- 1973–1974: Manfred Schüler
- 1974–1978: Joachim Hiehle
- 1977–1980: Manfred Lahnstein (SPD)
- 1978–1989: Günter Obert
- 1981–1982: Horst Schulmann
- 1982–1989: Hans Tietmeyer
- 1989–1993: Peter Klemm
- 1990–1993: Horst Köhler (CDU)
- 1991–1995: Franz-Christoph Zeitler
- 1993–2004: Manfred Overhaus
- 1993–1994: Gert Haller
- 1994–1998: Jürgen Stark
- 1998–1999: Heiner Flassbeck
- 1998–1999: Claus Noé
- 1999–2002: Heribert Zitzelsberger
- 1999–2005: Caio Koch-Weser
- 2002–2006: Volker Halsch (SPD)
- 2004–2005: Gerd Ehlers
- 2005–2008: Thomas Mirow (SPD)
- since 2005: Werner Gatzer
- 2005–2009: Axel Nawrath
- since 2008: Jörg Asmussen
- 2009–2010: Walther Otremba
- since 2010: Hans Bernhard Beus

== See also ==
- List of German finance ministers

== Sources ==
- Website of the German Federal Finance Ministry
