= Sirkka Hämäläinen =

Finnish economist

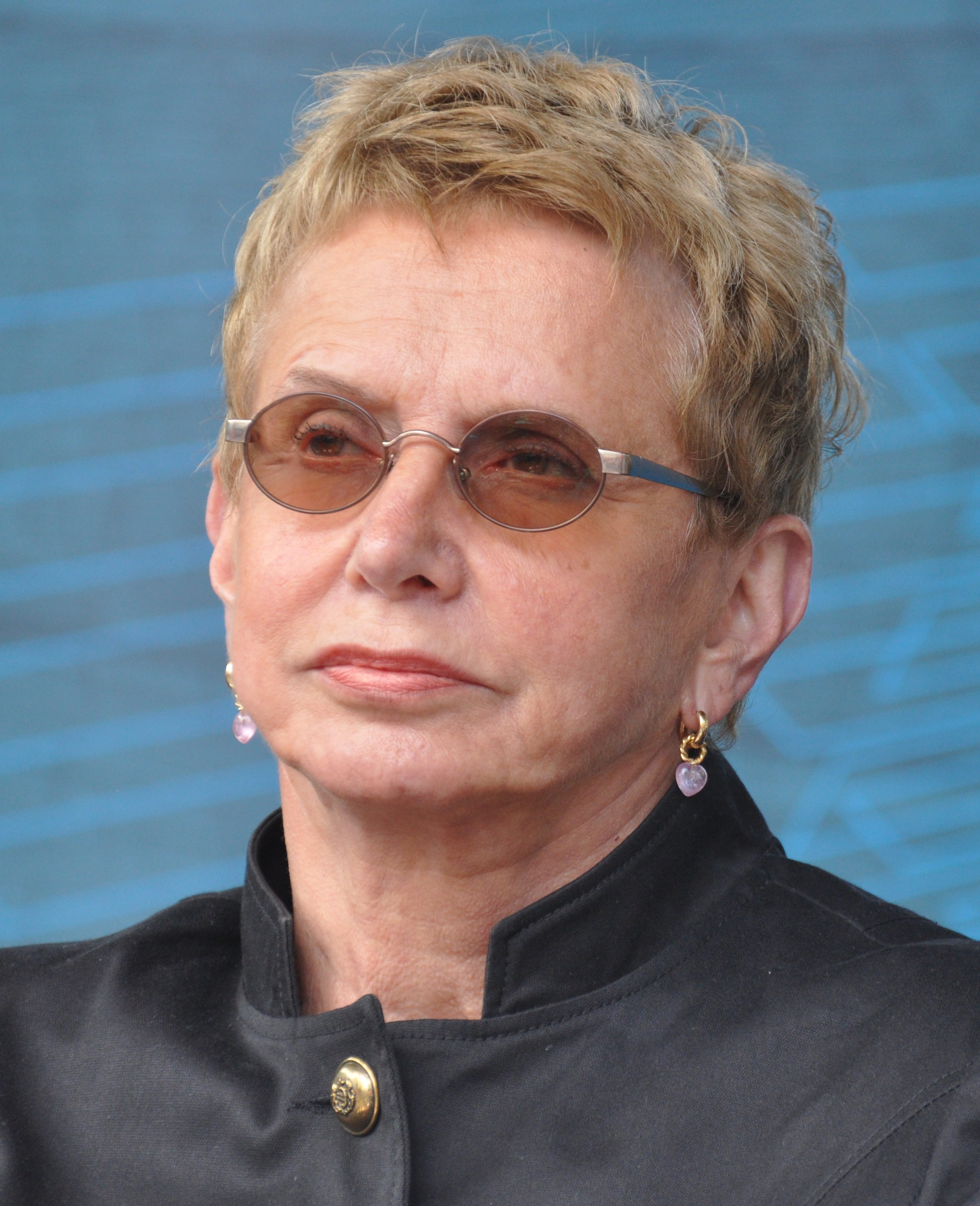

Member of the Executive Board of the European Central Bank
- In office 1 June 1998 – 31 May 2003
- Preceded by: Position established
- Succeeded by: Gertrude Tumpel-Gugerell

Governor of the Bank of Finland
- In office 5 April 1992 – 31 May 1998
- Preceded by: Rolf Kullberg
- Succeeded by: Matti Vanhala

Personal details
- Born: 8 May 1939 (age 85); Riihimäki, Finland
- Education: Helsinki School of Economics; Turku School of Economics

Sirkka Aune-Marjatta Hämäläinen (born 8 May 1939 in Riihimäki) is a Finnish economist who served as a member of the Executive Board of the European Central Bank from 1998 to 2003. She previously served as the governor of the Bank of Finland from 1992 to 1998. Hämäläinen was the first woman to hold either post.

== Early life and education ==
Hämäläinen was born on 8 May 1939, in Riihimäki. Her parents were Martti Oskari Hinkkala, a farmer, and Impi Aune Nikander, a household economics teacher. She graduated from the Karkkila Co-educational School in 1957 and following it attended Helsinki School of Economics from which she obtained her B.S. and M.Sc. in economics in 1961 and 1964 respectively. She continued her studies at the same alma mater and got her Licentiate and Doctorate in 1979 and 1981 respectively.

== Career ==
Sirkka Hämäläinen began her career in 1961 as a research assistant at the Bank of Finland Institute for Economic Research. She was then promoted to Economist and served as such until 1972 when she became Head of the Department of National Economy. From 1981 to 1982 Hämäläinen was Head of the Department at the Ministry of Finance and from 1982 to 1991 served as a Director at the Bank of Finland. In 1992 she was appointed Governor of the central bank, and was the first woman to hold that post. Hämäläinen resigned from the Bank of Finland when appointed to serve on the Executive Board of the European Central Bank, also the first female in the, which she kept from 1998 to 2003.

In October 2000 Hämäläinen spoke at the Institute of International and European Affairs.

== Board member ==
From 1986 to 1992 Hämäläinen served on Supervisory Board of the Huhtamaki and from 1987 to 1990 she was a member of the Executive Board at the Finnish Cultural Foundation's Supporting Society. Hämäläinen was then promoted to Board of Directors and then to its Supervisory Board at which she served until 1992 and 2005 respectively. She also served at the Board of Business Education Fund in 1989 and was a Chairman of the Board of the Consumer Research Center from 1990 to 1996.

Hämäläinen had also served on many Delegation Boards. In 1994 she served as a Delegation Member of the Savonlinna Opera Festival while being a Chairman of the Risto Ryti Delegation. A year later, she served on Delegation Boards of Valamo Foundation and Stiftelsen Åbo Akademie and from 1995 to 2006 she was a member of the Trilateral Commission. Between 1997 and 2000 she served as Chairman and then as a Director of the Raging Roses Association.

In 2004 Sirkka Hämäläinen joined Board Professionals Association and the same year was promoted to its board of directors.

While serving to various corporate organizations, Hämäläinen was a Chairman of the Board of the Finnish Chamber Orchestra from 2004 to 2008 and until 2009 she served on the Helsinki School of Economics Advisory Board.

Sirkka Hämäläinen returned to her alma mater and served as Vice Chairman of the Board of the Aalto University School of Arts, Design and Architecture from 2012 to 2014.

== Personal life ==
From 1961 to 1995, Sirkka Hämäläinen was married to Lieutenant Colonel Arvo Alpo Ossian. Together they had two children, Salla Johanna (born 1964) and Jonni Tero (born 1969). In 1999 she married Bo Erik Johan Lindfors.

== Honors ==
- Honorary doctorate, Åbo Akademi University (1995)
- Chairman of the Risto Ryti Society (1994-2001)
- Member of Real Academia de Ciencias Económicas y Financieras, Spain.
- Order of the White Star
- Order of the White Rose of Finland

== Sources ==
- Flitner, Bettina: Frauen mit Visionen – 48 Europäerinnen (Women with visions – 48 Europeans). With texts by Alice Schwarzer. Munich: Knesebeck, 2004. ISBN 3-89660-211-X, p. 104–107.

== See also ==
- Trilateral Commission

Government offices
Preceded by Rolf Kullberg	Governor of the Bank of Finland; 1992–1998	Succeeded by Matti Vanhala
New office	Member of the Executive Board of the European Central Bank; 1998–2003	Succeeded by Gertrude Tumpel-Gugerell
