= Jürgen Stark =

German economist

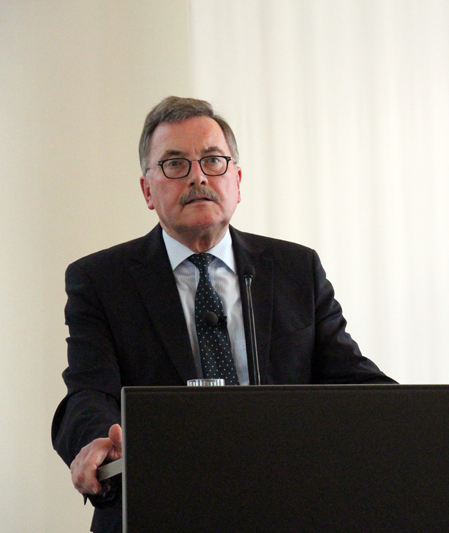

Chief Economist of the European Central Bank
- In office 1 June 2006 – 31 December 2011
- President: Jean-Claude Trichet; Mario Draghi
- Preceded by: Otmar Issing
- Succeeded by: Peter Praet

Member of the Executive Board of the European Central Bank
- In office 1 June 2006 – 31 December 2011
- Preceded by: Otmar Issing
- Succeeded by: Jörg Asmussen

President of the Bundesbank Acting
- In office 16 April 2004 – 30 April 2004
- Preceded by: Ernst Welteke
- Succeeded by: Axel A. Weber

Personal details
- Born: 31 May 1948 (age 78) Gau-Odernheim, Germany
- Party: Free Democratic Party
- Education: University of Hohenheim; University of Tübingen

Jürgen Stark (born 31 May 1948 in Gau-Odernheim, Germany) is a German economist who served as a member of the Executive Board of the European Central Bank from 2006 to 2011 and concurrently as ECB chief economist. Within the Executive Board, he was responsible for Economics and for Monetary Analysis and resigned before expiration of his term in opposition to ECB's bond-buying programme.

== Early life and education ==
Stark grew up in Rhineland-Palatinate. His father owned a vineyard in Gau-Odernheim in the Rheinhessen wine region. Stark, the second son, considered continuing in the family business. He studied economics at the University of Hohenheim and University of Tübingen, both near Stuttgart, from 1968 to 1973. During that time, he told an interviewer he participated in protests including against the Vietnam War: “We all, more or less at one point or time or another, had revolutionary ideas about what was just. But this was an episode that came to an end with the end of my studies. Then I became more serious.”

He received a doctorate in 1975.

== Career ==
From 1978 to 1998 Stark held economic policy positions in the German Federal Government. From September 1998 to May 2006 he served two consecutive terms as Vice President of the Bundesbank, acting as President of the bank in 2004.

On 9 September 2011, it was reported that Stark would leave the ECB due to disagreement with the bank's controversial bond-buying programme, according to Reuters, while the ECB officially announced his resignation as being for "personal reasons". Stark's term had been set to expire in May 2014. Although he has officially resigned, he will continue to discharge the duties of his post until a successor is appointed, before the end of 2011. Current deputy finance minister of Germany, Jörg Asmussen, has been nominated as Stark's successor. In December, Stark spoke out against the idea of the International Monetary Fund becoming a major participant in broader efforts to address the European sovereign debt crisis. He envisioned instead, in an interview with the Sueddeutsche Zeitung, "an informal board of experts, which carefully checks the budgets of member states ... [, as] the nucleus for a future European finance ministry."

== Other activities ==
=== Corporate boards ===
- Amundi, Member of the Global Advisory Board (since 2016)

=== Non-profit organizations ===
- Bertelsmann Stiftung, Member of the Board of Trustees (since 2012)
- Free Democratic Party (FDP), Member of the Business Forum
- Friedrich August von Hayek Foundation, Member of the Board of Trustees
- Ifo Institute for Economic Research, Deputy Chairman of the Board of Trustees
- Senckenberg Nature Research Society, Member of the Board of Trustees

== Personal life ==
Stark "and his wife, Christine, whom he married in 1973, have a retirement house on the Baltic sea. They have two children. ... [H]e is on the board of Frankfurt’s Senckenberg natural history museum, reflecting his interest in palaeontology", it was reported in 2009.

Government offices
Preceded by Ernst Welteke	President of the Bundesbank; Acting; 2004	Succeeded by Axel A. Weber
Preceded by Otmar Issing	Member of the Executive Board of the European Central Bank; 2006–2012	Succeeded by Peter Praet
Preceded by Otmar Issing	Chief Economist of the European Central Bank; 2006–2012	Succeeded by Jörg Asmussen
