= Eugenio Domingo Solans =

Spanish economist

Member of the Executive Board of the European Central Bank
- In office 1 June 1998 – 31 May 2004
- Preceded by: Position established
- Succeeded by: José Manuel González-Paramo

Personal details
- Born: 26 November 1945 Barcelona, Spain
- Died: 9 November 2004 (aged 58)
- Education: University of Barcelona; Autonomous University of Madrid

Eugenio Domingo Solans (26 November 1945 in Barcelona – 9 November 2004) was a Spanish economist who served as a member of the Executive Board of the European Central Bank from 1998 to 2004. In 2006 he was awarded posthumously the Grand Cross of the Order of Isabella the Catholic.

Government offices
| New office | Member of the Executive Board of the European Central Bank; 1998–2004 | Succeeded by José Manuel González-Paramo |
