= Peter Praet =

Belgian economist (born 1949)

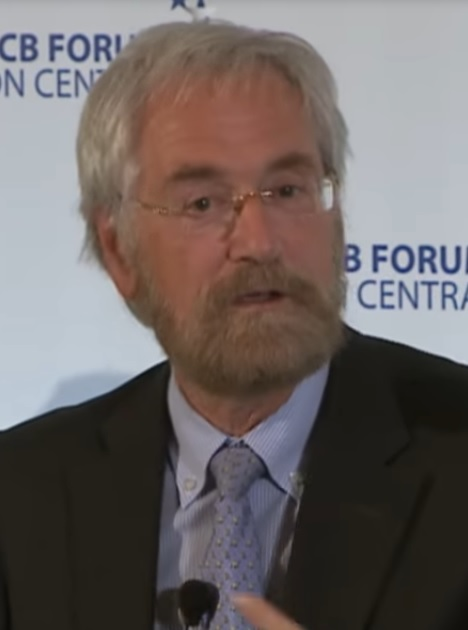

Chief Economist of the European Central Bank
- In office 1 January 2012 – 31 May 2019
- President: Mario Draghi
- Preceded by: Jürgen Stark
- Succeeded by: Philip R. Lane

Member of the Executive Board of the European Central Bank
- In office 1 June 2011 – 31 May 2019
- Preceded by: Gertrude Tumpel-Gugerell
- Succeeded by: Philip R. Lane

Personal details
- Born: 20 January 1949 (age 77) Herchen, Germany
- Education: Université libre de Bruxelles

Peter Praet (born 20 January 1949 in Herchen near Eitorf, North Rhine-Westphalia, Allied-occupied Germany) is a Belgian economist who served as a member of the Executive Board of the European Central Bank from 2011 to 2019 and concurrently as ECB chief economist following his 2012 appointment.

Within the ECB, Praet was widely considered to be centrist on monetary policy with a “dovish” tilt, meaning he was more likely to take growth prospects into account in the conduct of monetary policy than strict inflation “hawks” do.

== Early life and education ==
Praet is half-Belgian and half-German, his father being from Belgium and his mother from Germany. He graduated from Université libre de Bruxelles, with a BA in economics, an MA in economics in 1972, and PhD in economics in 1980.

== Career ==
Praet was chief economist for Fortis Bank. Between 1999 and 2000, he served as chief of staff to Belgian Finance Minister Didier Reynders. In this capacity, his main task was to lay the ground for Reynders’ Eurogroup presidency in 2001 and oversee the country's most ambitious tax-reform plan in decades.

Praet was executive director of the National Bank of Belgium from 2000 to 2011. He was also a member of the Basel Committee on Banking Supervision and an alternate member of the Bank for International Settlements' Global Economy Meeting. At the same time, he was professor of Monetary Economics at the Solvay Brussels School of Economics and Management.

=== European Central Bank, 2011–2019 ===
Before his appointment, Praet was nominated several times by the Belgian government to join the ECB Board. In 2004, his candidacy failed when the German, French, Italian and Spanish governments agreed the biggest Eurozone countries should always have a national member on the six-member board, and therefore chose José Manuel González-Páramo. In 2010, when Praet was proposed to the bank's vice-presidency, governments agreed that the position should go to a sitting governor of a central bank and not, as Praet then was, a director; as a consequence, Vítor Constâncio was chosen by the European Council to replace Lucas Papademos as vice-president. In 2011, Praet replaced Gertrude Tumpel-Gugerell; the other candidate for the position had been Elena Kohútiková.

Praet's appointment as ECB chief economist, which prepares recommendations on interest rate decisions superseded recommendations in favor of French and German counterparts. It was the first time in the bank's then 13-year history that the economics portfolio was given to a non-German.

Peter Praet retired in June 2019 after an eight-year run at the ECB.

== Other activities ==
- Bruegel, member of the board of trustees (2004–2011)
- Brussels Finance Institute (BFI), member of the academic advisory board (2010–2011)
- European Policy Centre (EPC), member of the board (2004–2007)

Government offices
Preceded by Gertrude Tumpel-Gugerell	Member of the Executive Board of the European Central Bank; 2011–2019	Succeeded by Philip R. Lane
Preceded by Jürgen Stark	Chief Economist of the European Central Bank; 2012–2019	Succeeded by Philip R. Lane
