= Erkki Liikanen =

Finnish politician (born 1950)

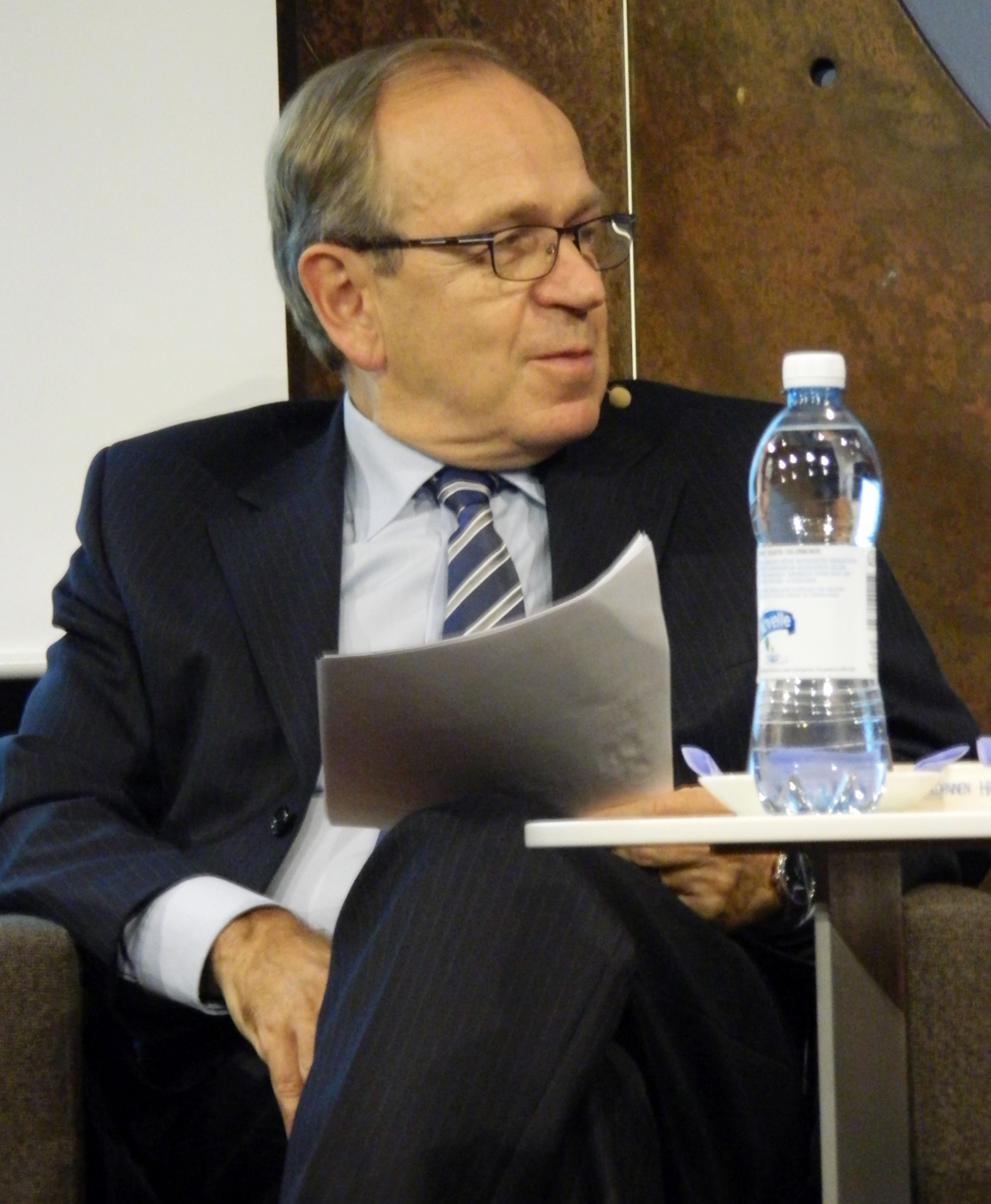
- Liikanen in 2016

Governor of Bank of Finland
- In office 12 July 2004 – 12 July 2018
- Preceded by: Matti Vanhala
- Succeeded by: Olli Rehn

European Commissioner for Enterprise and Information Society
- In office 17 September 1999 – 11 July 2004
- President: Romano Prodi
- Preceded by: Martin Bangemann (Industrial Affairs, Information and Telecommunications Technologies)
- Succeeded by: Olli Rehn

European Commissioner for Budget, Personnel and Administration
- In office 25 January 1995 – 17 September 1999
- President: Jacques Santer; Manuel Marín (Acting)
- Preceded by: Peter Schmidhuber (Budget and Financial Control)
- Succeeded by: Michaele Schreyer (Budget); Neil Kinnock (Administrative Reform)

Minister of Finance
- In office 30 April 1987 – 28 February 1990
- Prime Minister: Harri Holkeri
- Preceded by: Esko Ollila
- Succeeded by: Matti Louekoski

Member of Parliament from Mikkeli
- In office 22 January 1972 – 31 August 1990

Personal details
- Born: Erkki Antero Liikanen; 19 September 1950 (age 75) Mikkeli, Finland
- Party: Social Democratic Party
- Spouse: Hanna-Liisa Issakainen (m. 1971)
- Education: University of Helsinki

Erkki Antero Liikanen (born 19 September 1950) is a Finnish social democratic politician, former European Commissioner and former Governor of the Bank of Finland. Since 2018 he has been chair of the Trustees of the IFRS Foundation and Chairman of the Board of the Helsinki Graduate School of Economics at University of Helsinki, and since 2020 chairman of Bruegel.

== Early life and education ==
Erkki Antero Liikanen obtained a bachelor’s degree in Political Science (Economics) from the University of Helsinki in 1975.

== Political career ==
Liikanen was elected to the Finnish Parliament in 1972 when he was only 21 years old. Liikanen was appointed the Minister of Finance in the Holkeri Cabinet in 1987. He left Parliament in 1990 to become the first Finnish Ambassador to the European Union.

In 1994 he became the first Finnish Member of the European Commission. He was Commissioner for Budget, Personnel and administration, which included responsibilities for translation and information technology.

Liikanen served as Governor of the Bank of Finland from 12 July 2004. As such he also became a Member of the Governing Council of the European Central Bank (2004–2018) and Governor of the International Monetary Fund for Finland (2004–2018).

In February 2012, EU Commissioner Michel Barnier asked Liikanen to chair a group of experts to assess the need for structural reforms to the EU banking sector. Their works is known as the Liikanen report was published on 2 October 2012.

Liikanen was also the chairman of Finnish Red Cross between June 2008 and June 2014.

In early 2019, a Reuters poll of economists found that while Benoît Cœuré was considered best-suited for the role as President of the European Central Bank, the most likely compromise candidate was Liikanen.

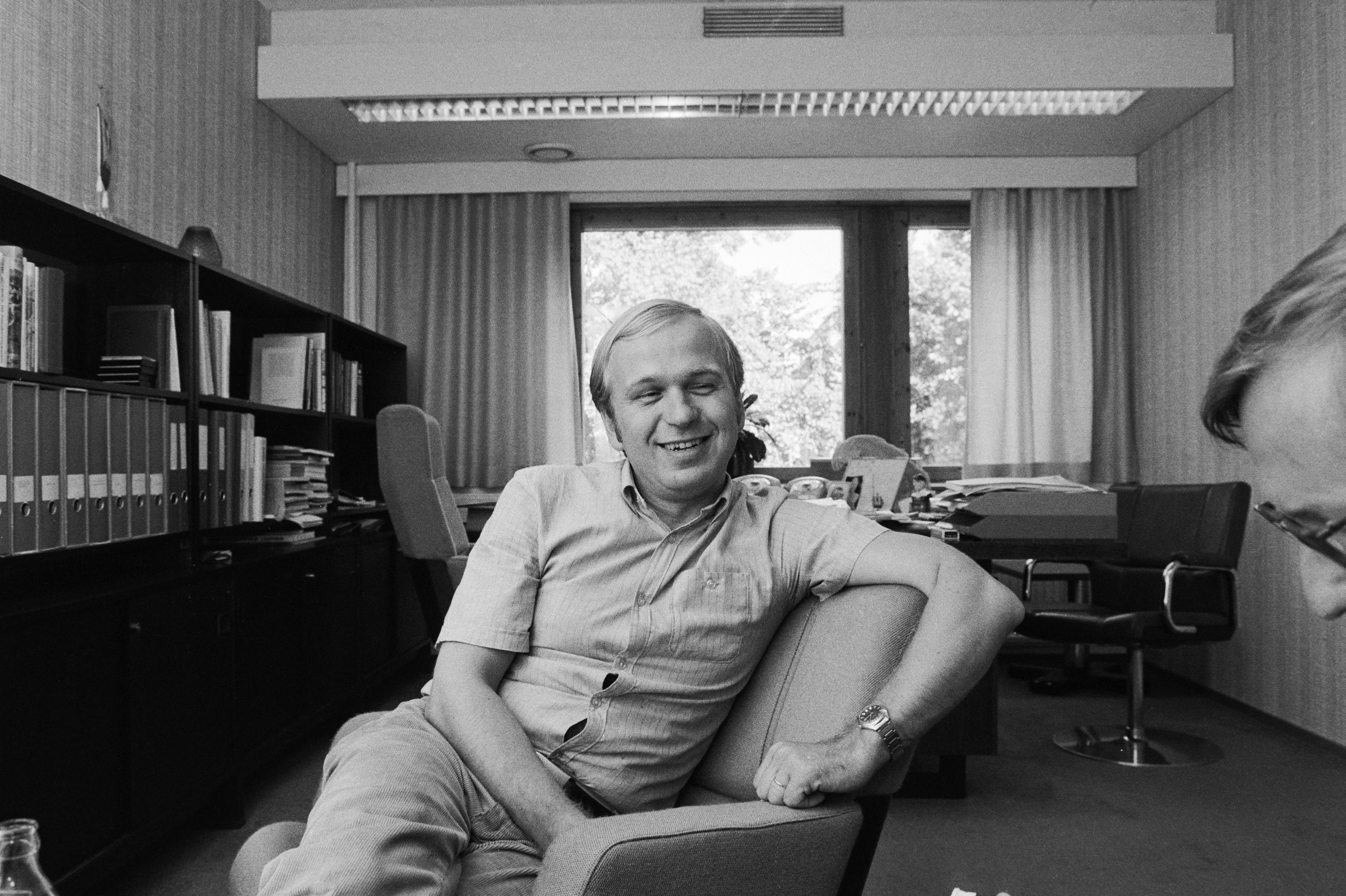
Liikanen in 1970s

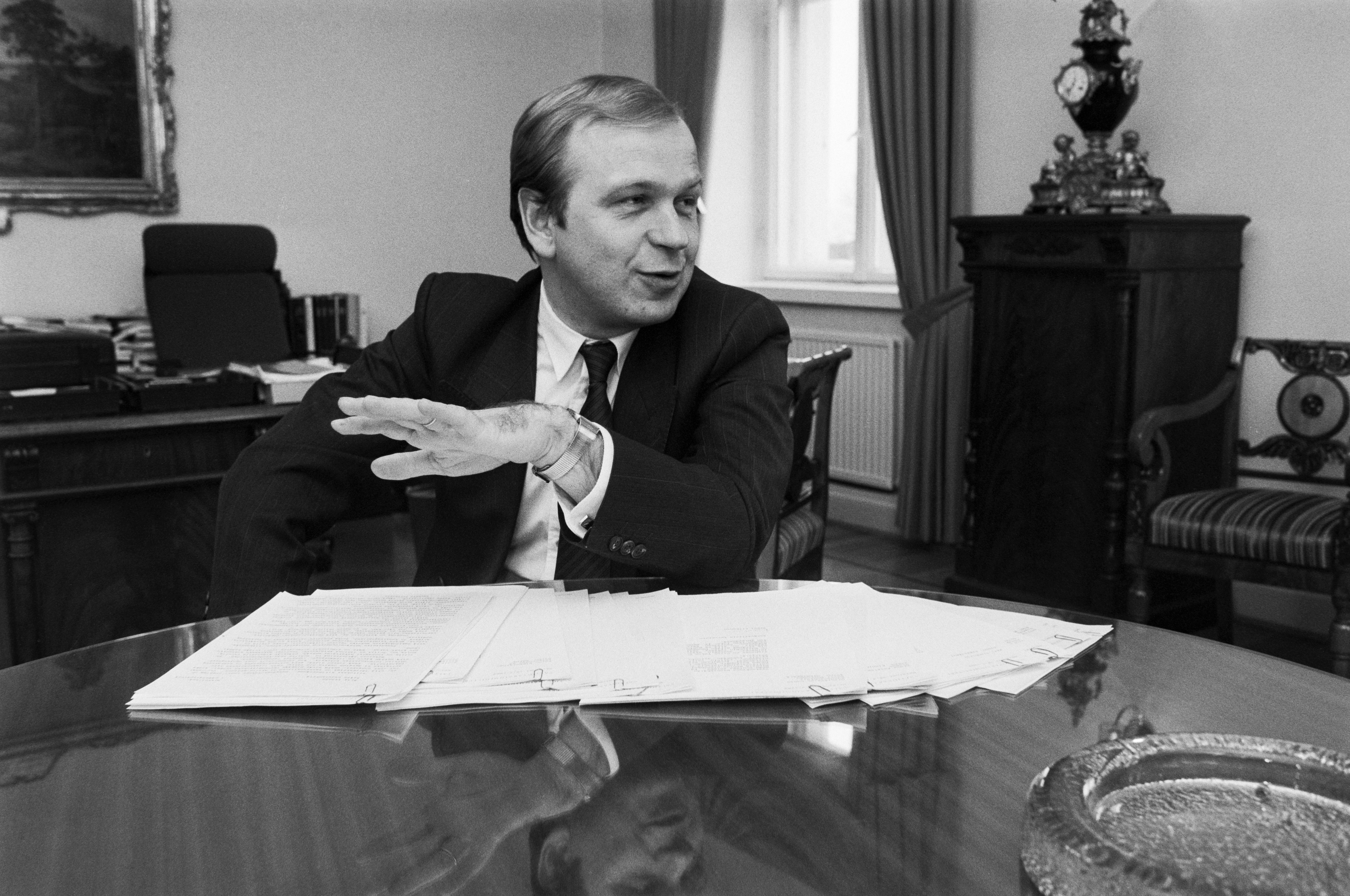
Liikanen in 1989

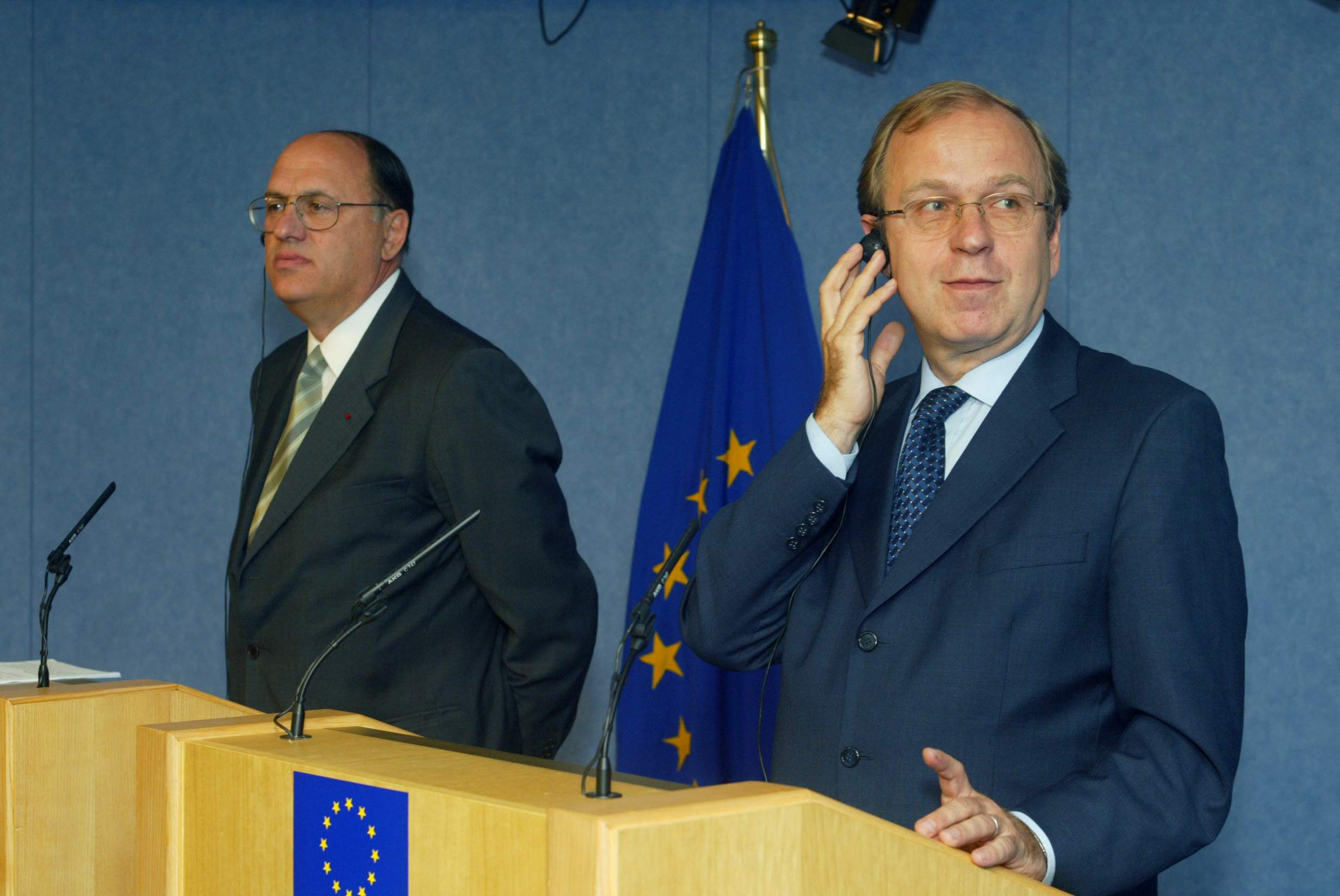
Jean-Paul Béchat & Erkki Liikanen in 2002

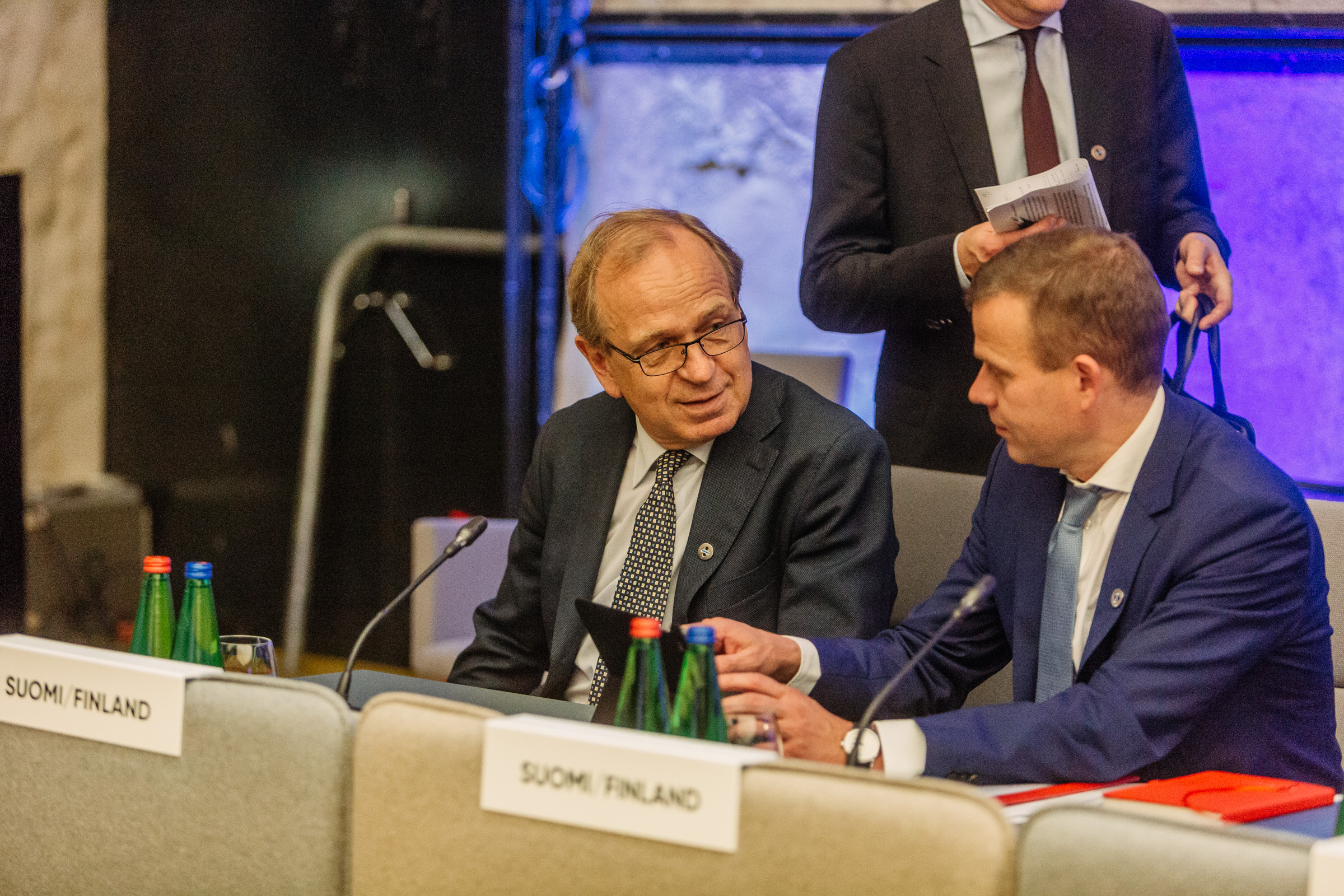
Erkki Liikanen & Petteri Orpo in 2017

== Positions held ==
- 2004–2018 Chairman of the Board of the Bank of Finland
- 1995–2004 Member of the European Commission, Brussels
- 1990–1994 Ambassador Extraordinary and Plenipotentiary, Head of Finnish Mission to the European Union, Brussels
- 1987–1990 Minister of Finance
- 1983–1987 Parliamentary Trustee to the Bank of Finland (Vice-Chairman), Speaker's Council
- 1981–1987 Secretary-General of the Social Democratic Party
- 1980–1989 Member and subsequently Chairman of the Supervisory Board of the Outokumpu (steel)
- 1978, 1982, 1988 Elected as Member of the Electoral College to select the Finnish President
- 1972–1990 Member of Parliament; member of Cultural Affairs Committee (1972–1975), Agriculture and Forestry Committee (Vice-Chairman) (1977–1979), Foreign Affairs Committee (member 1975–1982; Chairman 1983–1987)

== Other activities ==
=== International organizations ===
- European Central Bank (ECB), Member of the Ethics Committee (since 2018)
- International Monetary Fund (IMF), Ex-Officio Member of the Board of Governors

=== Non-profit organizations ===
- Bruegel, Chair of the Board (since 2020)
- Bilderberg Group, Member of the Steering Committee
- Systemic Risk Council (SRC), Member of the Advisory Board
- Trilateral Commission, Member of the European Group

== Personal life ==
Liikanen is married to Hanna-Liisa Liikanen and they have two daughters.

== Literary work ==
- Brysselin päiväkirjat 1990–1994 (edited by Eila Nevalainen) ISBN 951-1-13832-4

Political offices
Preceded by Esko Ollila	Minister of Finance; 1987–1990	Succeeded by Matti Louekoski
First	Finnish European Commissioner; 1995–2004	Succeeded by Olli Rehn
Preceded by Peter Schmidhuber as European Commissioner for Budget and Financial Control	European Commissioner for Budget, and Personnel and Administration; 1995–1999	Succeeded by Michaele Schreyer as European Commissioner for the Budget
Preceded by Peter Schmidhuber as European Commissioner for Budget and Financial Control	European Commissioner for Budget, and Personnel and Administration; 1995–1999	Succeeded by Neil Kinnock as European Commissioner for Administrative Reform
Preceded by Martin Bangemann as European Commissioner for Industrial Affairs, Information and Telecommunications Technologies	European Commissioner for Enterprise and Information Society; 1999–2004; Served alongside: Ján Figeľ	Succeeded by Olli Rehn
Government offices
Preceded by Matti Vanhala	Governor of Bank of Finland; 2004–2018	Succeeded by Olli Rehn
