= Otmar Issing =

German economist

Chief Economist of the European Central Bank
- In office 1 June 1998 – 31 May 2006
- President: Wim Duisenberg; Jean-Claude Trichet
- Preceded by: Position established
- Succeeded by: Jürgen Stark

Member of the Executive Board of the European Central Bank
- In office 1 July 1998 – 1 June 2006
- Preceded by: Position established
- Succeeded by: Jürgen Stark

Personal details
- Born: 27 March 1936 (age 90) Würzburg, Germany
- Education: University of Würzburg

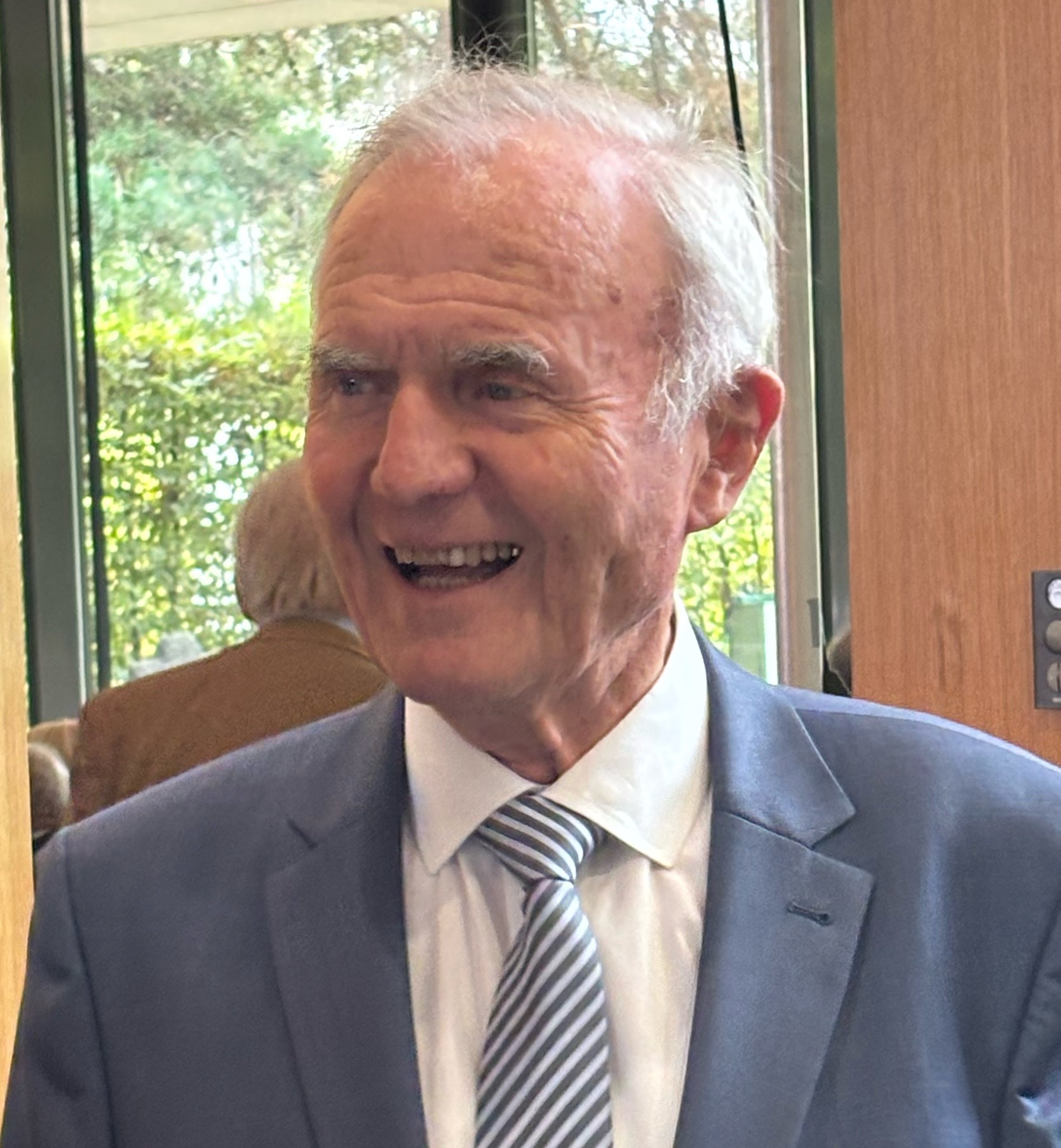
Issing 2025

Otmar Issing (born 27 March 1936) is a German economist who was a member of the Executive Board of the European Central Bank from 1998 to 2006 and concurrently ECB chief economist. He developed the 'two-pillar' approach to monetary policy decision-making that the ECB has adopted. Issing has been president of the Center for Financial Studies since 2006.

== Life ==
Issing was born in Würzburg. He studied economics at the University of Würzburg from 1955 until 1960 with temporary studies in London and Paris. From 1960 to 1966 he worked as a research assistant at the University of Würzburg. He earned his PhD in 1961 and received his postdoctoral lecture qualification (habilitation) in 1965.

In 1967 Issing became director of the Institute for International Economic Relations at the University of Erlangen-Nuremberg and full professor at the faculty of economics and social sciences of the University of Erlangen-Nuremberg. In 1973 he was appointed Professor of Economics, Monetary Affairs and International Economic Relations at the University of Würzburg.

From 1988 to 1990 Issing was a member of the German Council of Economic Experts and in 1990 he became a member of the board of the Deutsche Bundesbank with a seat on the Central Bank Council. In 1998 Issing became a member of the executive board of the European Central Bank, responsible for the Directorates General Economics and Research as well as its first Chief Economist.

Since June 2006 Issing has been president of the Center for Financial Studies (CFS) at the Goethe University in Frankfurt am Main and from 2007 until 2018 he was an international advisor to Goldman Sachs.

In October 2008 Issing chaired a German government expert group on the new financial order that drew up proposals on how to reform international financial markets (also known as "Issing Commission"). The group published six reports. In 2008 Issing was also a member of the high level group of the European Commission on financial supervision in the EU chaired by Jacques de Larosière. He was a Member of the G20 Eminent Persons Group on Global Financial Governance, which was formally established by G20 Finance Ministers and Central Bank Governors for the period 2017–2018.

== Memberships ==
Verein für Socialpolitik (German Economic Association), American Economic Association, Akademie der Wissenschaften und der Literatur (Academy of Sciences and Literature, as a Corresponding Member from 1989 to 1991), Academia Scientiarum et Artium Europaea, Walter Eucken Institute, Executive Committee of the Institute for European Affairs (INEA), Euro50 Group, Advisory Board of the Globalization and Monetary Policy Institute (Federal Reserve Bank of Dallas, until 2016).

== Publications ==
Issing's scientific publications almost cover the whole range of recent economic policy issues. His two main research topics are monetary theory and policy and international economic relations.

His most recent books are:

- "Der Euro in stürmischen Zeiten" about economic and monetary policy at Center for Financial Studies 2006-2015 (Vahlen, 2016)
- "Einführung in die Geldtheorie" (Introduction to Monetary Theory), fifteenth edition, Munich 2011. (Translations into Chinese and Bulgarian)
- "Der Euro. Geburt – Erfolg – Zukunft" about the creation of the new European currency published by Franz Vahlen in 2008., English version: "The birth of the Euro" (Cambridge, 2008), Chinese version 2010
- "Imperfect knowledge and monetary policy", with Vitor Gaspar, Oreste Tristani and David Vestin (Cambridge, 2005)
- "Monetary policy in the Euro Area", with Vitor Gaspar, Ignazio Angeloni and Oreste Tristani (Cambridge, 2001)
- "Von der D-Mark zum Euro" (Tübingen, 1998)
- "Einführung in die Geldpolitik" (6th edition, Munich, 1996)

== Positions ==
Issing was critical on the premature start of European Monetary Union with a large group of heterogenous countries. He warned EU member states not to violate the no-bailout clause that prohibits the assumption of liability for other countries' debts.

In October 2016 Issing warned that the Stability and Growth Pact was near to failure, there was no market discipline because of ECB interventions and no fiscal control mechanism from markets or politicians. The ECB had "crossed the Rubicon" and was in an untenable position, struggling to carry out its conflicting roles as agent of monetary policy, banking regulator, and Troika enforcer. Noting that the bank already held over €1 trillion of bonds bought at artificially low or negative yields, so would face great losses when interest rates rise again, he warned. The reputational risk of such actions by a central bank would have been unthinkable in the past." His conclusion was that in its current form the euro project was unworkable and one day would collapse.

== Other activities ==
=== Corporate boards ===
- Deloitte Germany, Member of the Advisory Board
- Goldman Sachs, Member of the International Advisory Council (since 2006)

=== Non-profit organizations ===
- Berggruen Institute, member of the Council for the Future of Europe
- European Academy of Sciences and Arts, member
- Friedrich August von Hayek Foundation, member of the board of trustees
- Gesellschaft für Kapitalmarktforschung, chairman of the board of trustees
- House of Finance at Goethe University Frankfurt, chairman of the board of trustees
- International Finance, member of the editorial board
- Leibniz Institute for Financial Research, member of the board of trustees
- Bocconi University, member of the International Advisory Council (until 2015)

== Recognition ==
=== Awards ===
- 1993 – Verdienstkreuz 1. Klasse des Verdienstordens der Bundesrepublik Deutschland
- 2003 – International Prize of the Friedrich-August-von-Hayek-Foundation
- 2004 – Bernhard-Harms Medal, Institute for World Economics, Kiel
- 2005 – Hans-Möller Medal for special merits in economics
- 2006 – Großes Verdienstkreuz des Verdienstordens der Bundesrepublik Deutschland
- 2006 – Ludwig-Erhard-Preis für Wirtschaftspublizistik
- 2006 – Grand Officier de l’Ordre de Mérite du Grand-Duché de Luxembourg
- 2007 – Silver Insignia of Würzburg
- 2011 – Gustav-Stolper Award of the Verein für Socialpolitik

=== Honorary degrees ===
- 1991 – Honorary professorship at the University of Würzburg
- 1996 – Honorary doctorate awarded by the Faculty of Law and Economic Sciences of the University of Bayreuth
- 1998 – Honorary doctorate awarded by the Faculty of Economic Sciences and Statistics of the University of Constance
- 1999 – Honorary doctorate awarded by the Faculty of Economic Sciences of the Goethe University Frankfurt
- 2007 – Honorary Professor Goethe University Frankfurt
- 2010 – Laurea Honoris Causa in International Economic Integration by the Faculty of Economic Sciences of the University of Pavia
- 2016 – Honorary Senator of the University of Würzburg

Government offices
New office	Member of the Executive Board of the European Central Bank; 1998–2006	Succeeded by Jürgen Stark
New office	Chief Economist of the European Central Bank; 1998–2006	Succeeded by Jürgen Stark
