= Piero Cipollone =

Italian economist and central banker (born 1962)

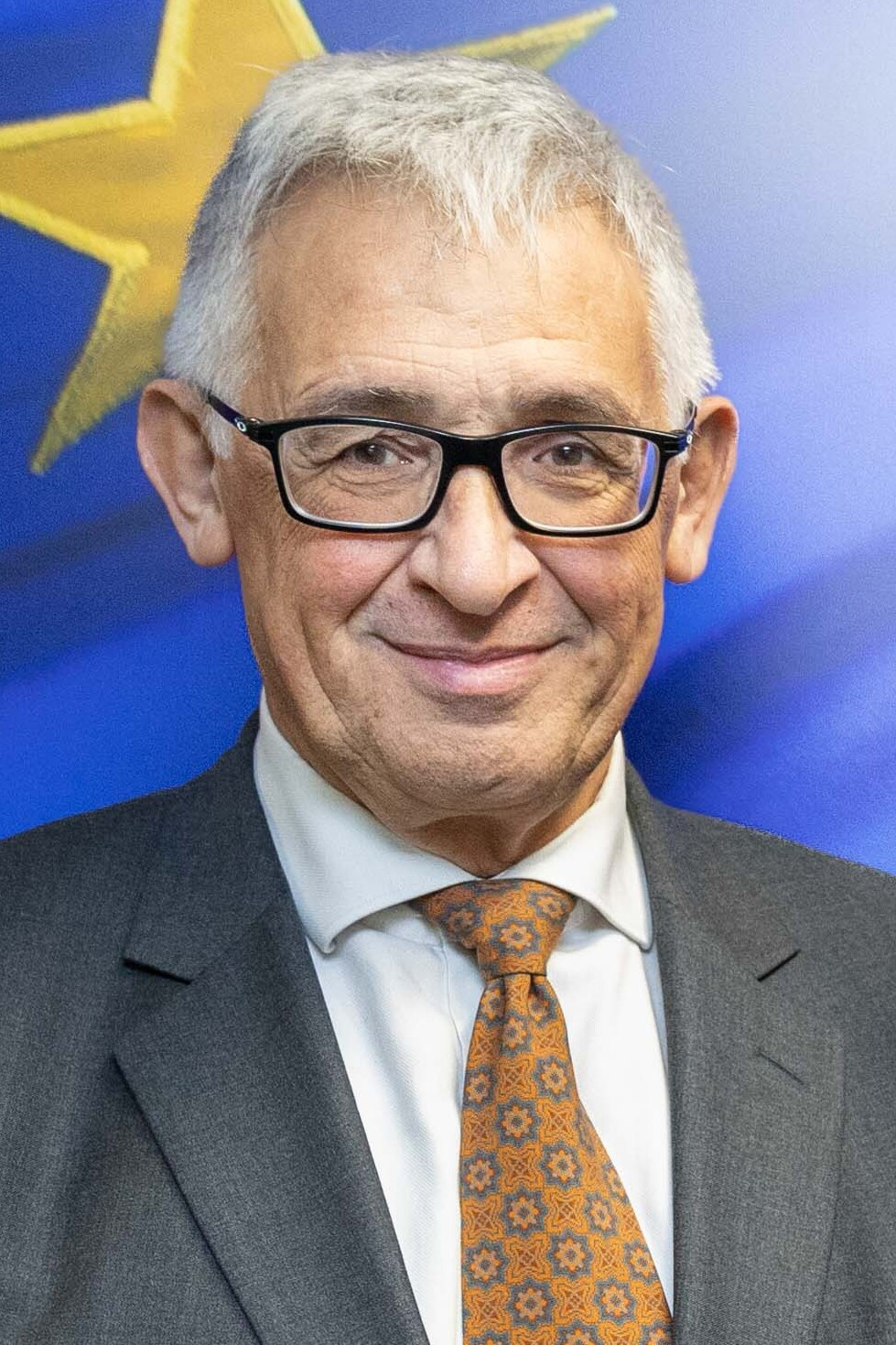
- Cipollone in 2024

Member of the Executive Board of the European Central Bank
- Incumbent
- Assumed office 1 November 2023
- Preceded by: Fabio Panetta

Personal details
- Born: 3 January 1962 (age 64) Avezzano, Italy
- Education: Sapienza University (BA); Stanford University (MA)

Piero Cipollone (born 3 January 1962) is an Italian economist and central banker who has been a member of the Executive Board of the European Central Bank since 1 November 2023, succeeding Fabio Panetta. He was deputy governor of the Bank of Italy from 2020 to 2023.

During a confirmation hearing at the European Parliament's ECON committee, Cipollone said he would support an "open and frank dialogue" with the European Parliament. His appointment at the ECB was supported in the European Parliament by 509 votes (54 votes against, 40 abstentions).

Cipollone is married and has 2 children, Rocco and Maria.

Before joining the Bank of Italy, Cipollone has held various high level positions, such as economic advisor to the Prime Minister of Italy, and as Executive Director at the World Bank.

Government offices
Preceded by Fabio Panetta	Member of the Executive Board of the European Central Bank; 2023–present	Incumbent
