= Rolf Kullberg =

Finnish economist (1930–2007)

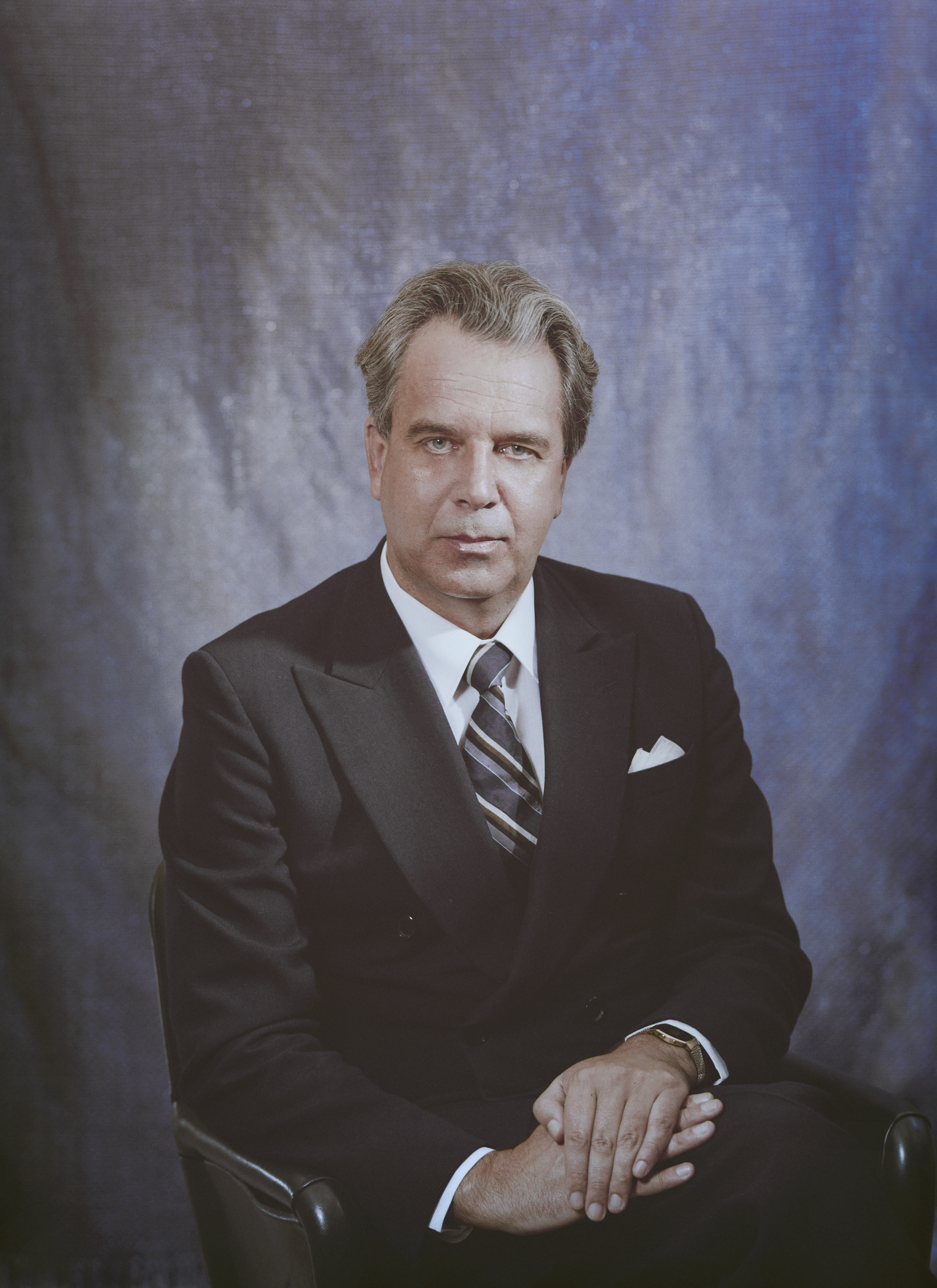

Governor of the Bank of Finland
- In office 1983–1992

Personal details
- Born: 3 October 1930 Pojo, Finland
- Died: 3 September 2007 (aged 76) Helsinki

Rolf Evert Kullberg (3 October 1930 in Pojo, Finland – 3 September 2007 in Helsinki) was the Governor of the Bank of Finland from 1983 to 1992. He was a member of the board since 1974. Before that he worked in the ministry of finance and in a private bank.

At the end of his term as a governor Finland experienced its worst recession. Before the recession there was a long period of growth and it was easy to borrow money. Kullberg was one of the first persons to publicly warn about the possible risks. He warned that people and companies are borrowing more than they can afford.

During those hard times the main goal of the Bank of Finland was to maintain a stable currency rate. Kullberg tied the currency rate of Finland's markka to ECU currency in 1991 in order to gain more stability. But finally Finland was forced to devalue and eventually let its currency float in 1992. This was a serious setback to Kullberg and he wanted to resign from his post. However, the president of Finland Mauno Koivisto asked him to continue. In the April 1992 he made an early retirement after publicly disagreeing with the prime minister Esko Aho about financial politics.

He died on 3 September 2007 at the age of 76 after a serious illness.

== Sources ==
- Announcement from the Bank of Finland. 3.9.2007.
- Necrology in Helsingin Sanomat. 3.9.2007. (Subscription required.)
- Kullberg, Rolf in Uppslagsverket Finland.

Government offices
Preceded by Ahti Karjalainen	Governor of the Bank of Finland; 1983–1992	Succeeded by Sirkka Hämäläinen
