= Ludwig Bohnstedt =

Baltic-German architect

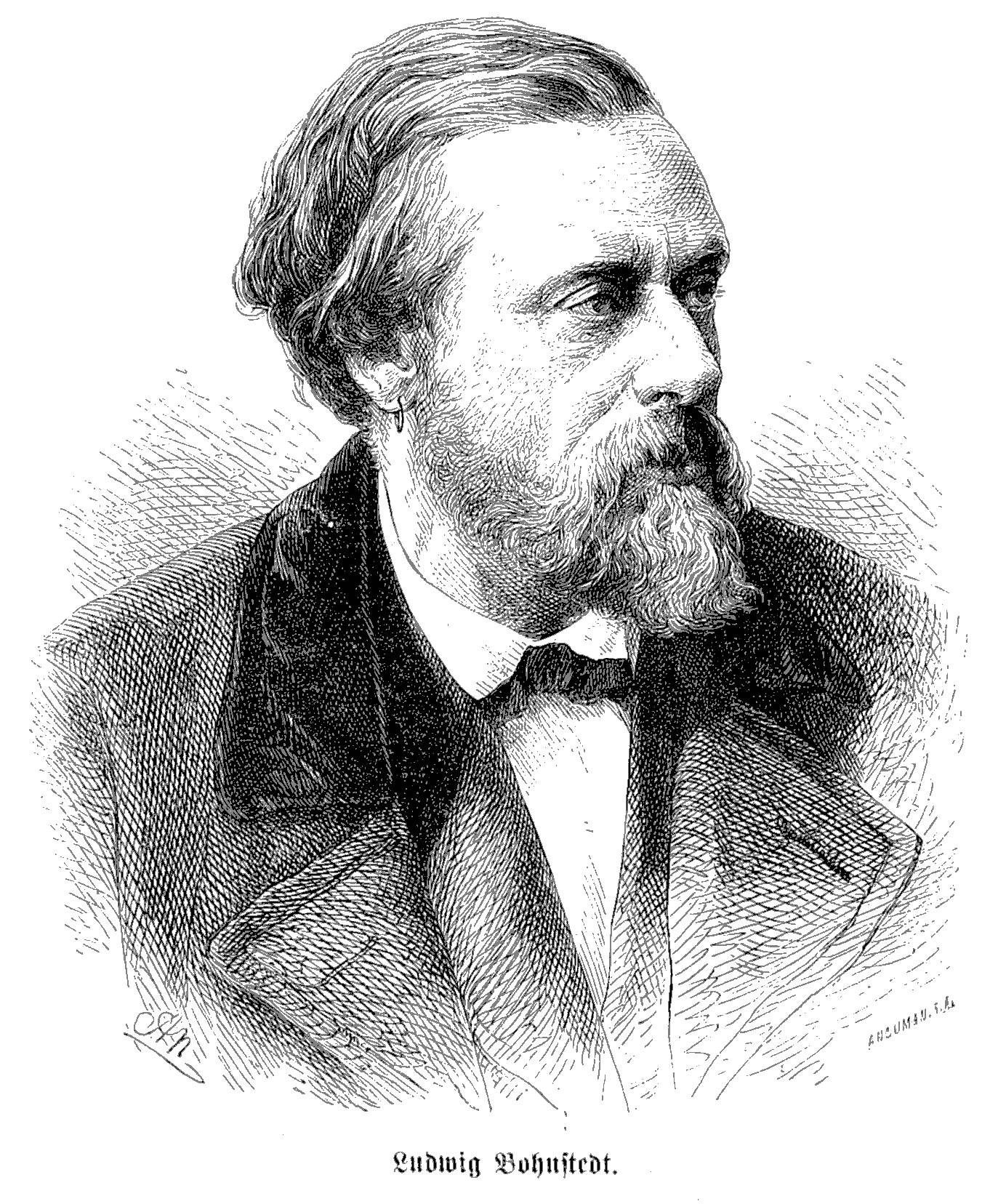
Ludwig Bohnstedt; from Die Gartenlaube (1872)

Franz Ludwig Carl Bohnstedt (27 October 1822, Saint Petersburg – 3 January 1885, Gotha) was a Baltic-German architect, who spent much of his career in Thuringia.

== Life and work ==
He was born in Russia, to German immigrants, and began his education at Saint Peter's School. In 1839, at the age of seventeen, he enrolled at the University of Berlin, where he studied philosophy, but soon withdrew in favor of studying architecture at the Prussian Academy of Arts, with Heinrich Strack. He returned to Saint Petersburg in 1843, and found a position in the studios of Rudolf Zhelyazevich. While there, he audited classes at the Imperial Academy of Arts and was named a "free artist".

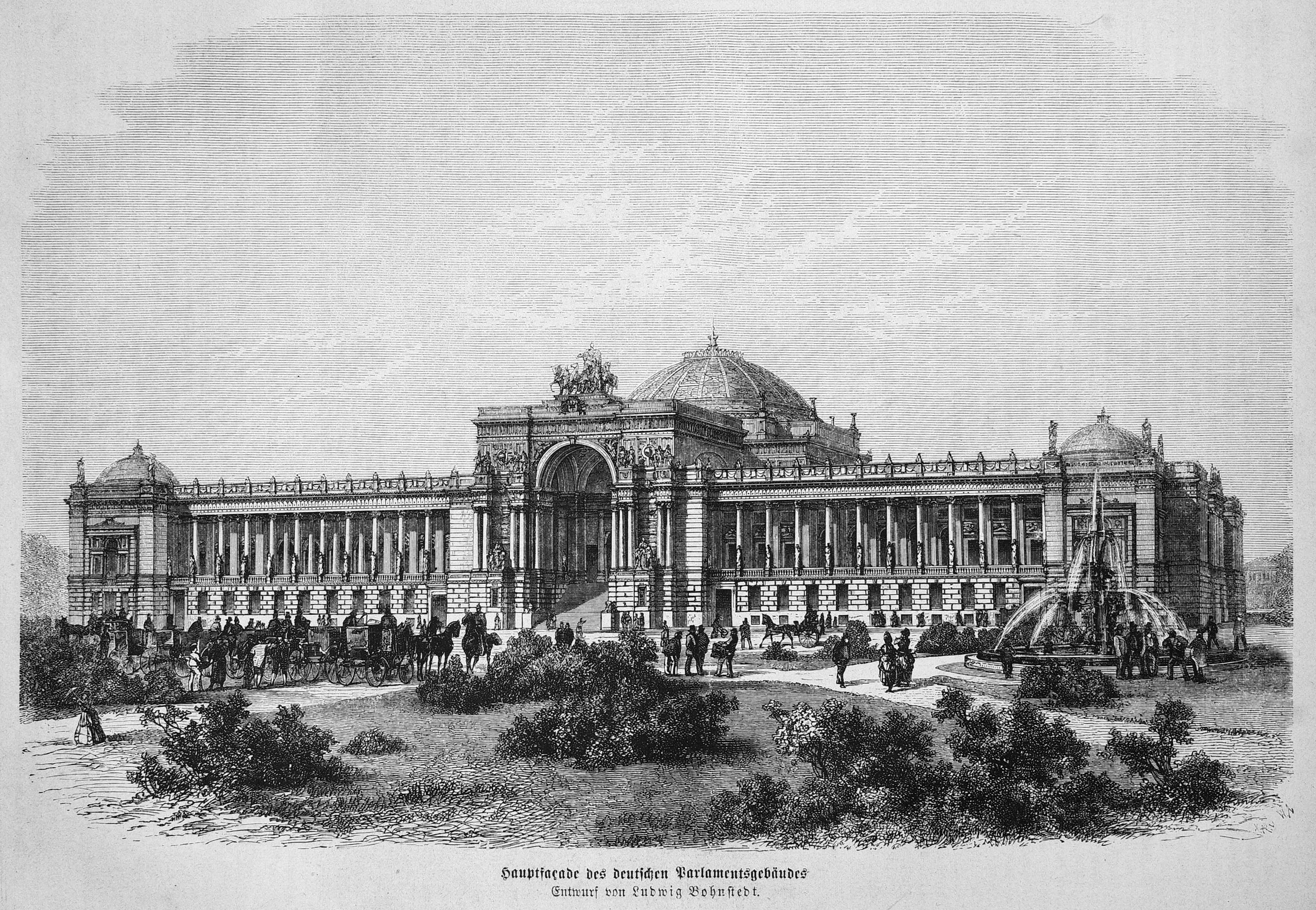
His original design for the Reichstag

In the late 1840s, he was appointed a Court Architect; helping to restore Royal properties on the Kamenny Islands, and at Oranienbaum. In 1850, he married Olga van der Vliet (1833–1906). They had five children, including Ernst (1851–1908), a manufacturing director, Alfred (1854–1906), who also became an architect, and Ida (1858–1916), a painter. From 1851 to 1854, he was the Russian government's chief architect. After 1858, he was a Councilor and Professor at the Imperial Academy. During this time, he entered numerous design competitions, mostly in Germany, but also in England, Spain and Italy.

This focus on Germany, as well as health considerations, led him to Saxe-Coburg-Gotha, where he and his family settled in 1862, and he worked as an official architect for the city of Gotha. He served as an honorary "Senator" for building construction there, from 1866 to 1871.

The following year, he entered what would become his most important competition; designing a new building for the Reichstag, in Berlin. Over one-hundred architects submitted entries. His design was awarded first prize. Due to unresolved political and financial issues, construction was postponed indefinitely. Some of those involved may have been uncomfortable with his foreign origin. In any event, he put the matter out of his mind and went on to other competitions; winning one for the new headquarters of the Bank of Finland in 1876. In the meantime, he also became a member of the Prussian Academy (1874), and an honorary member of the Amsterdam Building Academy (1875).

Then, in 1881, the Reichstag project was revived but, instead of using his design, a new competition was announced. His attempts to reverse this decision were to no avail. Many of his colleagues failed to support him, saying that his nearly ten-year-old designs were now obsolete. He reluctantly submitted a reworking of his plans. They received little attention and, in 1882, the contract went to Paul Wallot, an architect from Frankfurt. In 1883, he became ill and suffered a stroke that left him unable to work. He lingered until January, 1885.

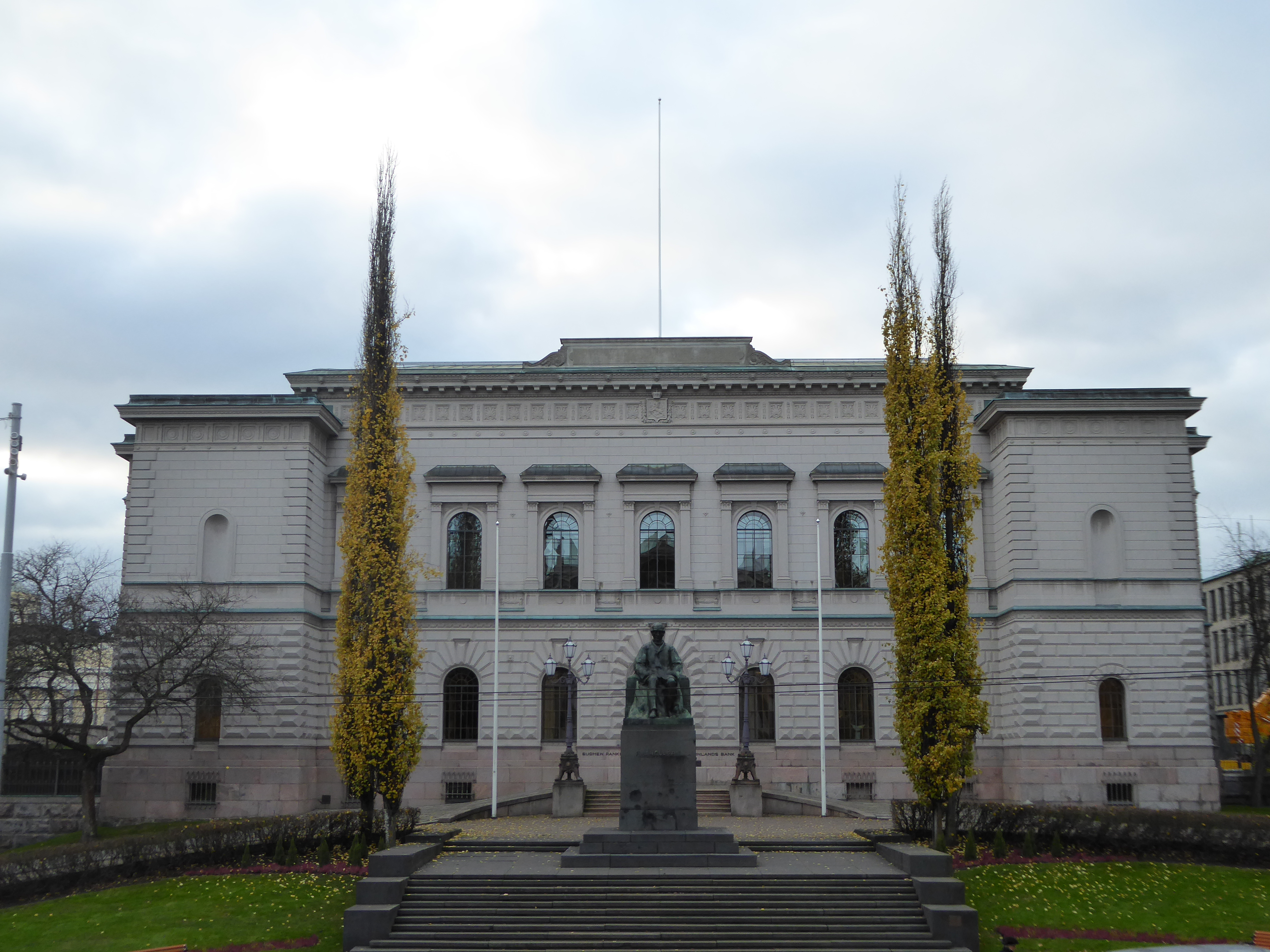
The Bank of Finland, with a statue of Johan Vilhelm Snellman by Emil Wikström
