= Theodor Wegelius =

Finnish politician

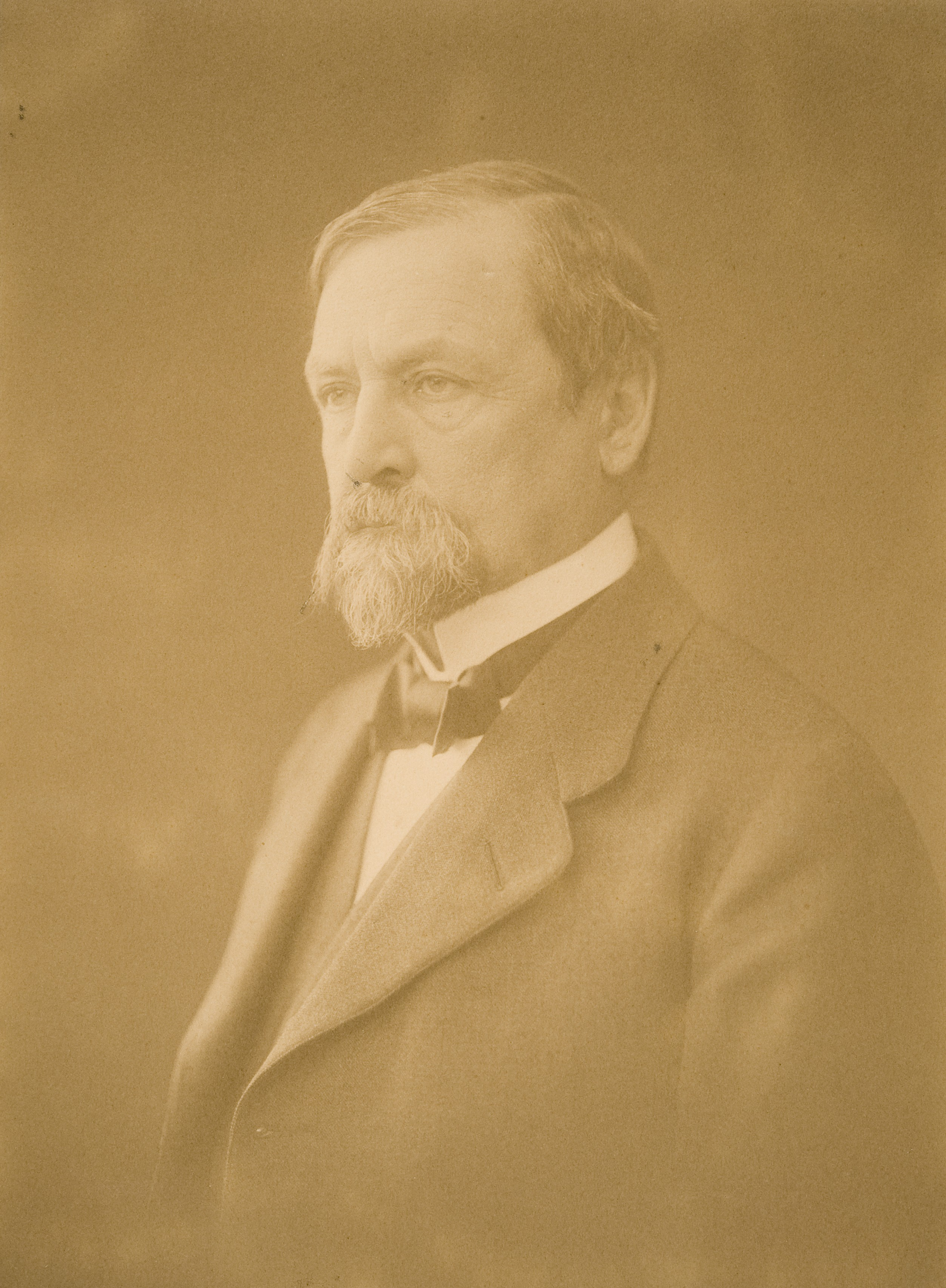
Portrait of Theodor Wegelius

Theodor Wegelius (7 March 1850, Helsinki - 16 June 1932) was a Finnish politician. He was a member of the Senate of Finland.

Government offices
Preceded by Alfred Charpentier	Governor of the Bank of Finland; 1898-1906	Succeeded by Clas Herman von Collan
