= Gertrude Tumpel-Gugerell =

Austrian economist, former board member of the ECB

Member of the Executive Board of the European Central Bank
- In office 1 June 2003 – 31 May 2011
- Preceded by: Sirkka Hämäläinen
- Succeeded by: Peter Praet

Personal details
- Born: 11 November 1952 (age 72) Kapelln, Austria
- Political party: Social Democratic Party
- Education: University of Vienna

Gertrude Tumpel-Gugerell (born 11 November 1952 in Kapelln) is an Austrian economist who served as a member of the Executive Board of the European Central Bank from 2003 to 2011. She previously served as vice-governor of the Oesterreichische Nationalbank from 1998 to 2003. She has been a member of the Council of the University of Leoben.

== Career ==
From 1998 until 2003, Tumpel-Gugerell served as vice governor of Austria's central bank Oesterreichische Nationalbank. During her time as member of the Executive Board of the European Central Bank, Tumpel-Gugerell was responsible for market operations, payment systems and market infrastructure as well as human resources, the budget, and organisation.

Currently, Tumpel-Gugerell is an Emeritus Consultant at the Austrian Institute of Economic Research (WIFO). From 2013 until 2014, she also served as chairperson of the European Commission's expert group on a debt redemption fund and eurobills; in 2014, she submitted the group's final report to President José Manuel Barroso and Vice-President Olli Rehn. In 2016, the board of the European Stability Mechanism appointed her to assess the financial assistance programmes to Greece, Portugal, Ireland and Cyprus by the ESM and its predecessor, the European Financial Stability Facility; the appointment was made by Jeroen Dijsselbloem, head of the Eurogroup and de facto chairman of the ESM board, in conjunction with Klaus Regling, managing director of the ESM. Tumpel-Gugerell presented her report in June 2017.

In 2018, International Monetary Fund (IMF) Managing Director Christine Lagarde appointed Tumpel-Gugerell to the External Advisory Group on Surveillance, a group mandated to review the Fund's operational priorities through 2025.

Tumpel-Gugerell is aligned with the Social Democrats (SPÖ).

== Other activities ==
=== Regulatory bodies ===
- Austrian Financial Market Authority (FMA), Member of the Supervisory Board (2002-2003)
- Economic and Financial Committee, Member (1997-2003)

=== Corporate boards ===
- AT&S, Member of the Supervisory Board (since 2019)
- OMV, Member of the Supervisory Board (since 2015)
- Commerzbank, Member of the Supervisory Board (since 2012)
- Vienna Insurance Group, Member of the Supervisory Board (since 2012)
- Austrian Federal Railways (ÖBB), Member of the Supervisory Board (2011–2018)
- Finanzmarktbeteiligung Aktiengesellschaft des Bundes (FIMBAG), Member of the Supervisory Board (2011-2016)

=== Non-profit organizations ===
- Austrian Research Promotion Agency (FFG), Chairwoman of the Supervisory Board (since 2012)
- International Women's Forum (IWF), Member of the Board of Directors

Government offices
Preceded by Sirkka Hämäläinen	Member of the Executive Board of the European Central Bank; 2003–2011	Succeeded by Peter Praet
