= José Manuel González-Paramo =

Spanish economist

José González-Paramo
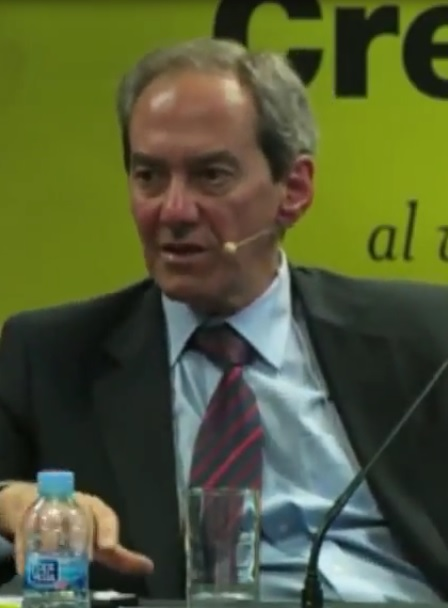

Member of the Executive Board of the European Central Bank
- In office 1 June 2004 – 31 May 2012
- Preceded by: Eugenio Domingo Solans
- Succeeded by: Yves Mersch

Personal details
- Born: 9 August 1958 (age 67); Madrid, Spain
- Education: Complutense University; Columbia University

José M. González-Páramo is a Spanish economist who served as a member of the Executive Board of the European Central Bank from 2004 to 2012.

== Early life and education ==
González-Páramo holds a Ph.D., M.Phil. and M.A. in Economics from Columbia University, for which he was a Fulbright scholar,. He also has a Ph.D. from Universidad Complutense.

== Career ==
=== Career in the public sector ===
González-Páramo's professional record comprises central bank decision-making and private sector responsibilities, academic experience and advisory positions. In 1988 he was appointed Professor of Economics at UCM. In addition, he has taught advanced courses in economic analysis of public policies at the Centro de Estudios Monetarios y Financieros in Madrid and at other research centres.

From 1985 to 1994 González-Páramo was an economic adviser to various public and private institutions including the Banco de España (1989–1994), the European Commission, the IMF and the World Bank Group. He has been involved in working groups on economic and financial matters at the Bank for International Settlements and the Organisation for Economic Co-operation and Development.

Before his appointment to the ECB, González-Páramo was a member of the governing council of the Bank of Spain (1994–2004) and of its executive committee (1998–2004).

=== Executive Board of the European Central Bank, 2004–2012 ===
González-Páramo served as a member of the executive board of the European Central Bank (ECB) for an eight-year mandate, under the leadership of successive presidents Jean-Claude Trichet (2004-2010) and Mario Draghi (2011-2012). At the time of his appointment, Spain succeeded with his nomination despite pressure from Belgium and other smaller states to nominate Peter Praet. from 2004 to 2012. He was also a member of the Governing Council of the ECB, the Eurosystem’s principal policymaking body. At the ECB, González-Páramo was responsible for market operations and monetary policy implementation. He was in charge of designing and implementing innovative “non-conventional monetary policy measures”. During his tenure at the ECB he held a variety of other responsibilities, including economic research, risk management, statistics, information systems and banknotes. He was a member of the Committee on the Global Financial System of the Bank for International Settlements (BIS). González-Páramo has written and spoken extensively on financial matters, monetary policy and the economy. Throughout his term, he was as seen by observers as one of the more dovish, economic growth-focused board members.

In 2012, González-Páramo was widely mentioned in news media as a potential candidate to succeed Miguel Ángel Fernández Ordóñez as Governor of the Bank of Spain; the position eventually went to Luis María Linde.

Since December 2016, he has been Chairman for Europe of the TransAtlantic Business Council (TABC). He previously chaired in Europe the TransAtlantic Business Dialoge (TABD), a body under the TABC and with which it merged in December 2016.

He was a member of the BBVA Board of Directors from June 2013 to February 2020 and Chief Officer, Global Economics, Regulation & Public Affairs, and Chairman of the International Advisory Board from 2018 to 2020.

=== Career in the private sector ===
Since September 2012 González-Páramo has been serving as Professor at IESE Business School.

In June 2013 González-Páramo was appointed Executive Board member of BBVA. Among other responsibilities in the group, he is the Chief Officer, Global Economics, Regulation & Public Affairs, and the Chairman of its International Advisory Board. He is also Chairman of European DataWarehouse GmbH, the first central data warehouse in Europe for asset-backed securities (ABS) transactions.

In 2021, González-Páramo chaired the search committee that selected economist Jeromin Zettelmeyer as new director of Bruegel.

== Other activities ==
- Bretton Woods Committee, Member of the Advisory Council (since 2020)
- European Council on Foreign Relations (ECFR), Member (since 2020)
- Scope Foundation, Member of the Honorary Board (since 2020)
- Transatlantic Business Council (TABC), chair of the board (since 2016)
- Bruegel, Member of the Board

== Recognition ==
González-Páramo is a member of the European Academy of Sciences and Arts, and has received a number of distinctions, including the Charles the Fifth Medal of the German-Spanish Chamber of Commerce ("contribution to a more united Europe"), Premio Institut D’Estudis Financers a la Excelencia Financiera ("professional career"), Premio Círculo de Empresarios and Doctor Honoris Causa (Universidad de Málaga), among others.

Government offices
Preceded by Eugenio Domingo Solans	Member of the Executive Board of the European Central Bank; 2004–2012	Succeeded by Yves Mersch
