= Executive Board of the European Central Bank =

Eurozone monetary policy authority

The Executive Board of the European Central Bank is the organ responsible for implementing monetary policy for the Eurozone in line with the guidelines and decisions taken by the Governing Council of the European Central Bank.

The executive board consists of the president, the vice-president and four other members, one of whom concurrently serves as ECB chief economist. All members are appointed by the European Council by qualified majority for a non-renewable eight-year term. As an exception, the officeholders appointed to the original board received staged terms so that one would be replaced each year. Under the ECB's rules board members do not represent a particular country, nor are they responsible for keeping track of economic conditions in one country. Instead, all board members are jointly responsible for monetary policy for the entire Euro area.

== Current members ==
The current members of the ECB Executive Board are as follows:

Composition of the Executive Board
| Name | State | Position | Start | End |
|---|---|---|---|---|
| Christine Lagarde | France | President | 1 November 2019 | 7 February 2027 |
| Boris Vujčić | Croatia | Vice President | 1 June 2026 | 31 May 2034 |
| Philip R. Lane | Ireland | Member; Chief Economist | 1 June 2019 | 31 May 2027 |
| Isabel Schnabel | Germany | Member | 1 January 2020 | 3 January 2027 |
| Frank Elderson | Netherlands | Member | 15 December 2020 | 14 December 2028 |
| Piero Cipollone | Italy | Member | 1 November 2023 | 31 October 2031 |

== List of Board members ==
The following is a list of past and present members of the Executive Board of the European Central Bank. A member serves for a non renewable term of eight year. Since the ECB was established in 1998, the following people have served as Executive Board members:

Status

Denotes a current member
- Italics denotes date of term ending

| Name | State | Start | End | Duration | Departure reason |
|---|---|---|---|---|---|
| Wim Duisenberg | Netherlands | 1 June 1998 | 31 October 2003 | 5 years, 152 days | Resigned |
| Christian Noyer | France | 1 June 1998 | 31 May 2002 | 3 years, 364 days | Term ended |
| Sirkka Hämäläinen | Finland | 1 June 1998 | 31 May 2003 | 4 years, 364 days | Term ended |
| Eugenio Domingo Solans | Spain | 1 June 1998 | 31 May 2004 | 5 years, 365 days | Term ended |
| Tommaso Padoa-Schioppa | Italy | 1 June 1998 | 31 May 2005 | 6 years, 364 days | Term ended |
| Otmar Issing | Germany | 1 June 1998 | 31 May 2006 | 7 years, 364 days | Term ended |
| Lucas Papademos | Greece | 1 June 2002 | 31 May 2010 | 7 years, 364 days | Term ended |
| Gertrude Tumpel-Gugerell | Austria | 1 June 2003 | 31 May 2011 | 7 years, 364 days | Term ended |
| Jean-Claude Trichet | France | 1 November 2003 | 31 October 2011 | 7 years, 364 days | Term ended |
| José Manuel González-Paramo | Spain | 1 June 2004 | 31 May 2012 | 7 years, 365 days | Term ended |
| Lorenzo Bini Smaghi | Italy | 1 June 2005 | 31 December 2011 | 6 years, 213 days | Resigned |
| Jürgen Stark | Germany | 1 June 2006 | 31 December 2011 | 5 years, 213 days | Resigned |
| Vítor Constâncio | Portugal | 1 June 2010 | 31 May 2018 | 7 years, 364 days | Term ended |
| Peter Praet | Belgium | 1 June 2011 | 31 May 2019 | 7 years, 364 days | Term ended |
| Mario Draghi | Italy | 1 November 2011 | 31 October 2019 | 7 years, 364 days | Term ended |
| Jörg Asmussen | Germany | 1 January 2012 | 8 January 2014 | 2 years, 7 days | Resigned |
| Benoît Cœuré | France | 1 January 2012 | 31 December 2019 | 7 years, 364 days | Term ended |
| Yves Mersch | Luxembourg | 15 December 2012 | 14 December 2020 | 7 years, 365 days | Term ended |
| Sabine Lautenschläger | Germany | 27 January 2014 | 31 October 2019 | 5 years, 277 days | Resigned |
| Luis de Guindos | Spain | 1 June 2018 | 31 May 2026 | 7 years, 364 days | Term ended |
| Philip R. Lane | Ireland | 1 June 2019 | 31 May 2027 | 7 years, 170 days | Incumbent |
| Christine Lagarde | France | 1 November 2019 | 7 February 2027 | 7 years, 17 days | Incumbent |
| Fabio Panetta | Italy | 1 January 2020 | 31 October 2023 | 3 years, 303 days | Resigned |
| Isabel Schnabel | Germany | 1 January 2020 | 3 January 2027 | 6 years, 321 days | Incumbent |
| Frank Elderson | Netherlands | 15 December 2020 | 14 December 2028 | 5 years, 338 days | Incumbent |
| Piero Cipollone | Italy | 1 November 2023 | 31 October 2031 | 3 years, 17 days | Incumbent |
| Boris Vujčić | Croatia | 1 June 2026 | 31 May 2034 | 170 days | Incumbent |

== Succession of seats ==
President
| Duisenberg | Netherlands | 1 June 1998 – 31 October 2003 |
| Trichet | France | 1 November 2003 – 31 October 2011 |
| Draghi | Italy | 1 November 2011 – 31 October 2019 |
| Lagarde | France | 1 November 2019 – present |

Vice President
| Noyer | France | 1 June 1998 – 31 May 2002 |
| Papademos | Greece | 1 June 2002 – 31 May 2010 |
| Constâncio | Portugal | 1 June 2010 – 31 May 2018 |
| de Guindos | Spain | 1 June 2018 – 31 May 2026 |
| Vujčić | Croatia | 1 June 2026 – present |

Chief Economist (non-statutory position)
| Issing | Germany | 1 June 1998 – 31 May 2006 |
| Stark | Germany | 1 June 2006 – 31 December 2011 |
| Praet | Belgium | 1 January 2012 – 31 May 2019 |
| Lane | Ireland | 1 June 2019 – present |

Seat 1
| Hämäläinen | Finland | 1 June 1998 – 31 May 2003 |
| Tumpel-Gugerell | Austria | 1 June 2003 – 31 May 2011 |
| Praet | Belgium | 1 June 2011 – 31 May 2019 |
| Lane | Ireland | 1 June 2019 – present |

Seat 2
| Solans | Spain | 1 June 1998 – 31 May 2004 |
| González-Paramo | Spain | 1 June 2004 – 31 May 2012 |
| Mersch | Luxembourg | 15 December 2012 – 14 December 2020 |
| Elderson | Netherlands | 15 December 2020 – present |

Seat 3
| Padoa-Schioppa | Italy | 1 June 1998 – 31 May 2005 |
| Bini Smaghi | Italy | 1 June 2005 – 31 December 2011 |
| Cœuré | France | 1 January 2012 – 31 December 2019 |
| Panetta | Italy | 1 January 2020 – 31 October 2023 |
| Cipollone | Italy | 1 November 2023 – present |

Seat 4
| Issing | Germany | 1 June 1998 – 31 May 2006 |
| Stark | Germany | 1 June 2006 – 31 December 2011 |
| Asmussen | Germany | 1 January 2012 – 8 January 2014 |
| Lautenschläger | Germany | 27 January 2014 – 31 October 2019 |
| Schnabel | Germany | 1 January 2020 – present |

== See also ==
- ECB Supervisory Board
