= Veikko Kokkola =

Finnish politician

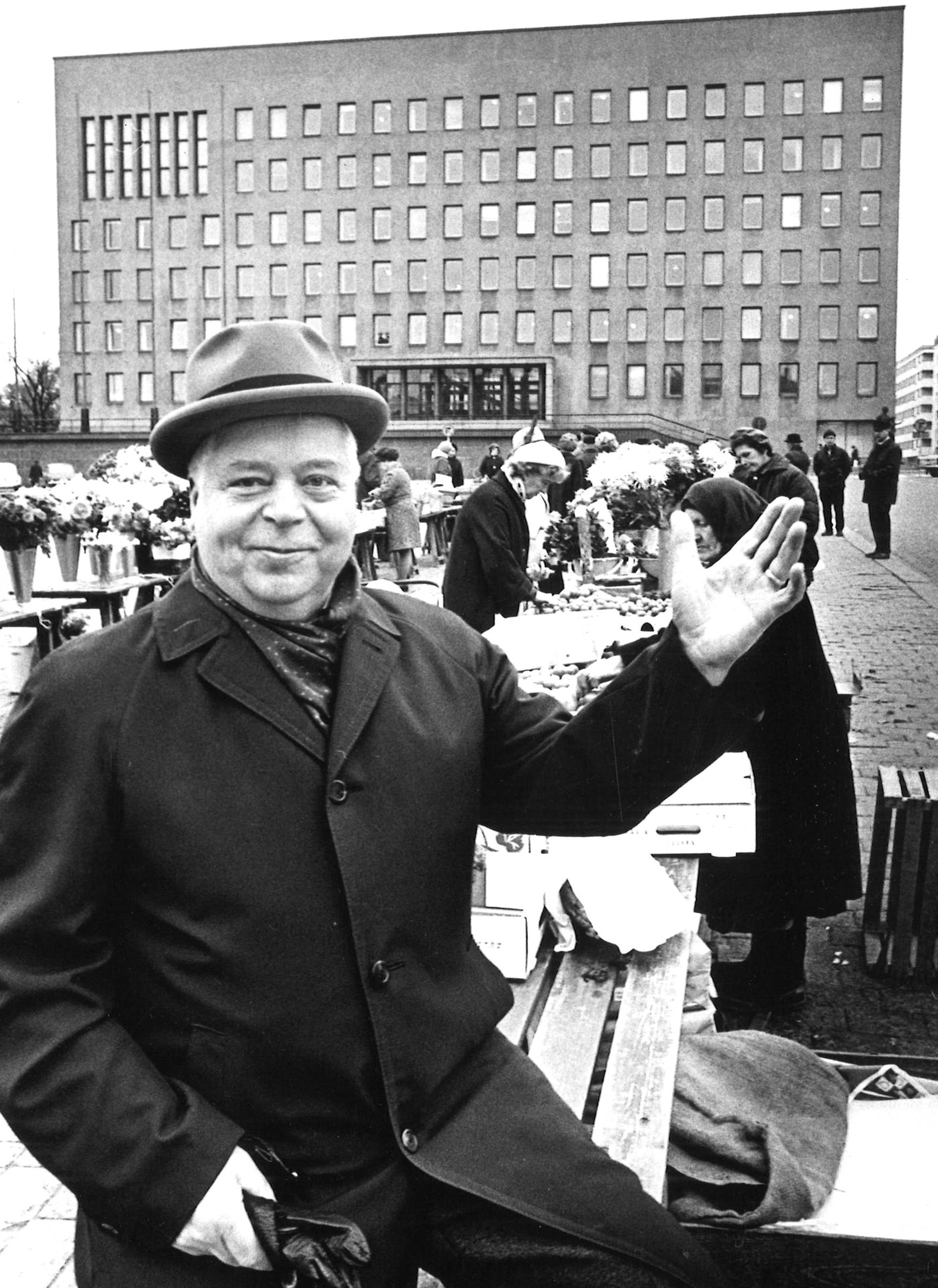
Veikko Kokkola

Veikko Johan Kokkola (2 January 1911, Kotka – 19 February 1974) was a Finnish politician. He was a Member of the Parliament of Finland from 1951 to 1970, representing the Social Democratic Party of Finland (SDP).
