= Financial situation of Alitalia =

History of finances in the Italian carrier

The financial situation of Alitalia describes the historical financial situation of Alitalia, the Italian airline company, including its losses, financial difficulties, government support, bailouts, mergers and bankruptcies. The company had reported only one year of profit (1998) since its foundation in 1946 and had been supported by the Italian government for most of its existence. The losses have been in part due to problems linked to government and political interference.

== History ==
=== Foundation – 2004 ===
Alitalia had lost money for years owing to problems linked to government and political interference. It had reported only one year of profit (1998) since its foundation in 1946. Alitalia reported net losses of more than €3.7 billion between 1999 and 2008. Previous state aid to Alitalia included some €1.5 billion in 1998 from the government of premier Romano Prodi. In 2002 Alitalia received a capital increase of €1.432 billion under the government of Silvio Berlusconi. In 2004 the Berlusconi government gave a €400mn 'bridge' loan to Alitalia. In 2005 the capital of Alitalia was increased by €1.6 billion, including an over €500mn bond float issued with the promise of a return to profit in 2006. (Unfortunately the year ended with a loss of €626 million). The Italian government and some other organizations had invested €4.9 billion since 1998.

=== 2004 – Financial crisis ===
In September 2004 the airline found itself in financial difficulties, with management saying it did not have enough cash to pay worker salaries past the end of that month. It announced plans to lay off 5000 employees and to split the company into two divisions, an airline and a ground services division. It also said it was reconsidering its alliance with Air France. Talks went on with unions for pay cuts and layoffs, in an attempt to keep the company out of bankruptcy and possibly liquidation. On 24 September 2004, the company announced that it had reached an agreement with unions allowing access to a bridging loan from the Italian government.

Alitalia's troubles had now become so severe that Consob, Italy's stock market regulator, required it henceforth to report monthly on its debt and cash positions.

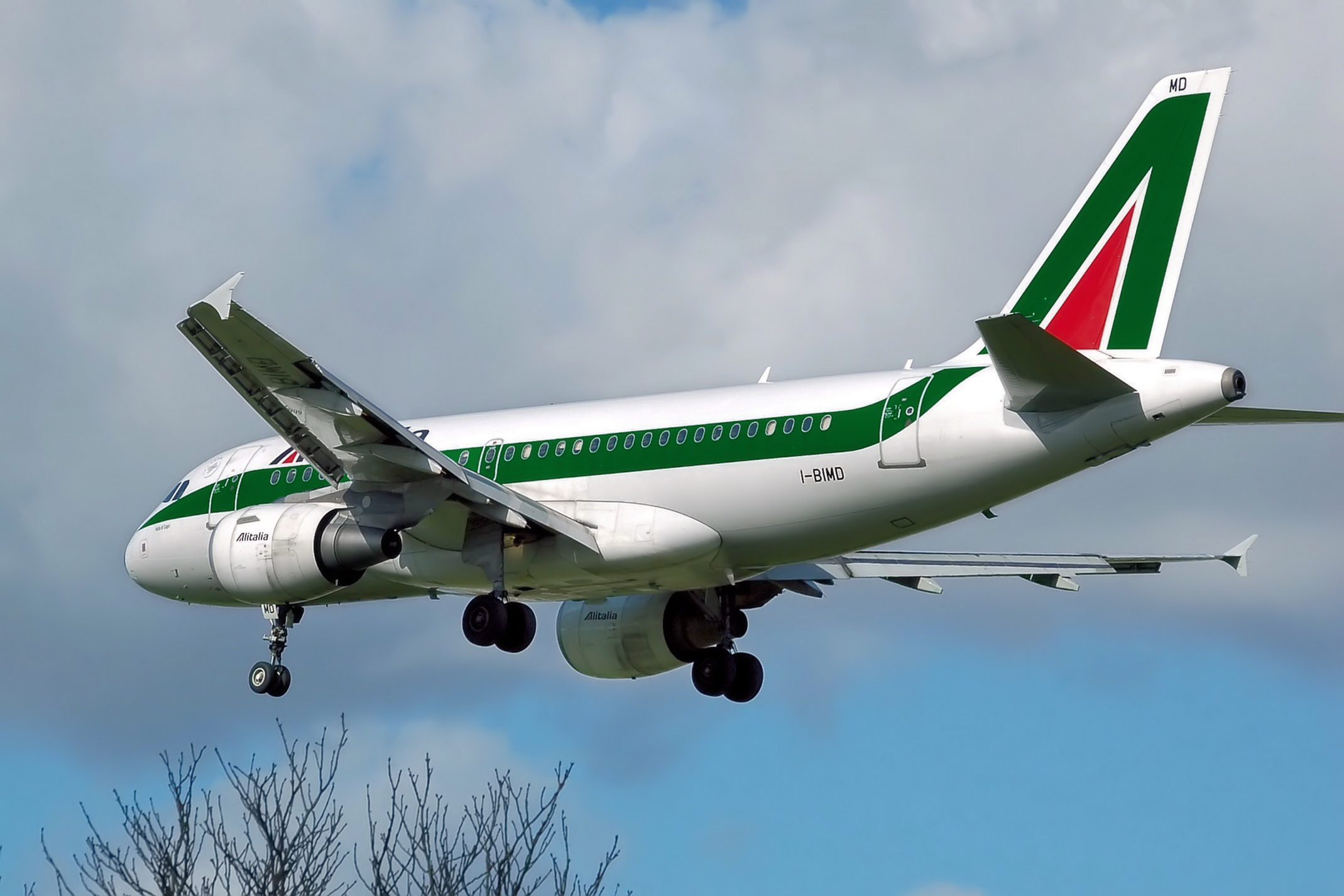
Alitalia Airbus A319-100 landing at London Heathrow Airport, England. (2007)

=== 2006 – European Union stops support ===
The government could in 2006 no longer offer support to the failing airline since it had been forbidden by the European Union to inject new capital. Therefore, as all other attempts to save the company had failed, the Italian government announced its willingness to lead Alitalia towards privatization by lowering its part of ownership in it. A public notification was given in January 2007, seeking a buyer who would acquire at least 30.1% of Alitalia, and also guarantee the airline's 18,000 jobs, domestic routes, and the Italian identity of the Alitalia brand, according to the tender document published on the Treasury Web site. Italy invited bids to be submitted by January 29, 2007. (Under Italian law, a buyer of more than 30% of a company must make a public offer to buy out the other shareholders.) In July 2007 the last of the bidders for Alitalia backed off, making the procedure fail.

In September 2007, Maurizio Prato, at that time chairman, told senators in Rome "Alitalia is in a comatose state, it is in the intensive care unit". Further he said: "Personally, I am surprised by the general refusal to accept reality and by the fact that a company in this state does not have the possibility, even though it is listed on the stock market, to make autonomous decisions even if this is needed for its survival".

Another attempt was made to sell the 49.9% stake of the Italian government through a different procedure, involving the selection of a single major partner with whom to contract.

=== 2007 – Purchase by Air France-KLM and investment group ===
On December 6, 2007, three parties (Air France-KLM; an investment group led by businessman and lawyer Antonio Baldassare; and a group composed by the Italian domestic carrier Air One and several banks) presented proposals to purchase Alitalia. The Board of Directors of Alitalia announced the Air France-KLM Group as the winner. In March 2008 the Air France-KLM Group offered a share swap of €0.10 per share, a total of €138 million. The Air France-KLM Group offered to pay €608 million for the convertible bonds issued by Alitalia. The company would also invest €1 billion in Alitalia by selling new shares of Alitalia. Air France-KLM Group intended to maintain the Italian identity of Alitalia and an Italian would have a seat on Air France-KLM's board. It would restructure Alitalia's flight network, basing the bulk of its operations at Rome Leonardo da Vinci Fiumicino Airport and cutting international flights from Alitalia's second hub, Milan Malpensa Airport. Air France-KLM would end Alitalia's freight service by 2010.

The terms of the Air France-KLM Group of the March 28 draft agreement were (with a deadline of 31 March 2008):

1. that the possible consequences of a lawsuit by the Milan Malpensa Airport owners, Sea, will be dealt with by the Italian government.
2. that the current and next government support this proposal.
3. that the unions agree to the dismissal of 1,620 employees of Alitalia Fly: 567 pilots, 594 flight assistants, 121 foreign employees and 398 ground employees.
4. that Air France-KLM will employ only 3,200 of the 7,600 employees of Alitalia's maintenance subsidiary, Alitalia Servizi, if they can dismiss 500 of these employees.
5. that Alitalia's bulk flight network will be based at Rome Leonardo da Vinci Fiumicino Airport and that international flights from Milan Malpensa Airport will be stopped.
6. that the Italian government agree to a capital injection of €300 million in Alitalia to prevent the company from going broke; to be repaid from the raised capital after the takeover has been finalized.
7. that the Italian government invest in the Rome Leonardo da Vinci Fiumicino Airport.
8. that the Italian government guarantee the landing rights of Alitalia.
9. that the relevant competition authorities authorize the proposal.

The fate of the rest (of a total of about 7,600) of the employees of Alitalia's maintenance subsidiary, Alitalia Servizi, was uncertain.

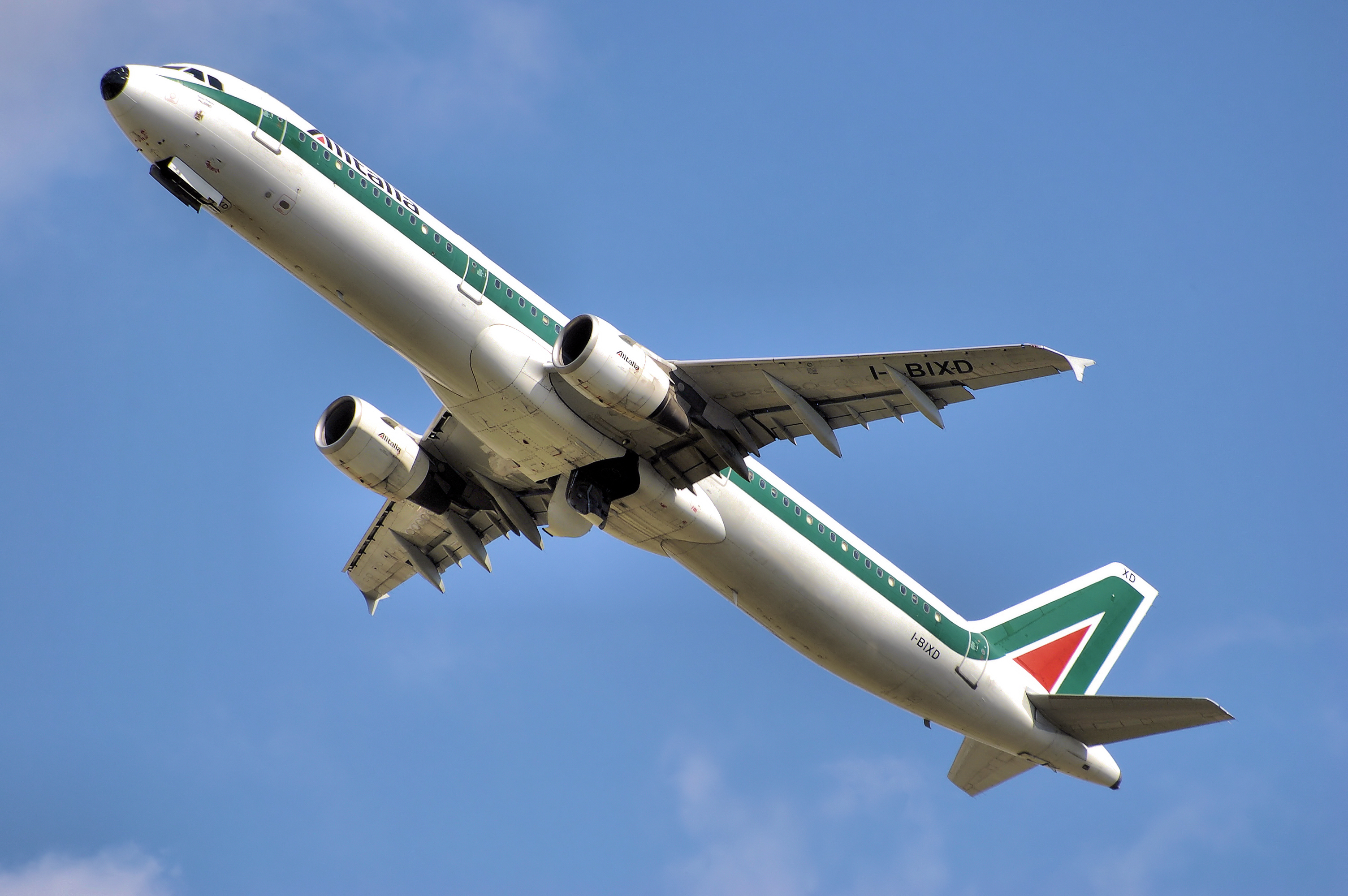
Alitalia Airbus A321-100 takes off from London Heathrow Airport, England. (2008)

The Board of Directors of Alitalia and the Italian government agreed to these terms; the unions did not. Raffaele Bonanni, the leader of one of Alitalia's main unions, CISL, denounced the agreement: "The government is delivering us naked to negotiate with Air France to the detriment of the workers, infrastructure, and the general interests of the country,". The pilots' union, ANPAC, which had agreed to the takeover in principle, called the French-Dutch offer "unacceptable". ANPAC especially disagreed with the plan to end the freight service by 2010. The talks with the unions over the takeover by Air France-KLM collapsed when the French-Dutch carrier refused to accept union demands, hours before a deadline to win their support was to expire. As a consequence Alitalia's chairman, Maurizio Prato, resigned on April 2, 2008. Air France-KLM formally announced on Monday 21 April 2008 that the terms set for the take-over of Alitalia were no longer valid and that the offer was withdrawn.

There were plans to merge the profitable parts of Alitalia into Air One. The newly formed airline would have a large fleet of Boeing and Airbus craft, and would offer both European and long haul flights. It was still unsure if Alitalia will remain in the SkyTeam alliance. There were also plans to reduce pilots and crew members and to increase their work hours and salary.

According to Edoardo Staunovo Polacco, a bankruptcy law lecturer at Bocconi University, "Alitalia is no longer able to stand on its own two feet... Either it must be saved by another party or it is inevitable it will go into special administration. It doesn't have any more money and cannot get any from the state". Its shares were suspended following the collapse of the Air France-KLM deal, and the board was to decide on 8 April 2008 whether the company should go into special administration.

The Board noted that on March 31, Alitalia's cash-to-hand and short-term financial credits (according to management figures) amounted to about €170 million, including the sum of €79 million arising from the sale of Air France KLM shares, but not including the fiscal credit of €69 million received on April 2. The Board reiterated Alitalia's need for substantial financial support, as forecast in this year's budget and in the contract set up with Air France-KLM, and that only by means of such support would it be possible to regain the required confidence to pursue the Company's business plan and hence to ensure continued operations.,

=== 2008 – Emergency loan ===
The Italian government decided on 22 April 2008 to give Alitalia an emergency loan of €300m ($475m) in an attempt to stave off the airline's collapse. The outgoing administration of Romano Prodi agreed the lifeline with new Prime Minister Silvio Berlusconi, who was elected in office in April 2008. Alitalia must prevent its capital from sinking below the threshold set by European rules. If Alitalia cannot meet this obligation, including safety guarantees, Italian aviation authorities could revoke Alitalia's license. The chairman of Italy's civil aviation agency ENAC, Vito Riggio, said "they have to see that there's continuity, among other things, for safety," and "They have to guarantee they have (financial) coverage for at least a year." Riggio told a talk show on state radio that ENAC could either revoke Alitalia's license or give it a provisional one if the airline cannot save itself financially. He did not give a time frame for any decision.

The European Union doubted the legality of this loan, as they had decided that Alitalia could not receive any form of state support until 2011. The EU announced on June 11, 2008, that they would investigate the loan. An EU executive said, "As Alitalia has already benefited from rescue and restructuring aid, Italy cannot, in principle, grant it any more aid." The EU regulators said the loan of public money might give Alitalia an unfair advantage over competitors. The EU checked whether private investors would have loaned Alitalia this amount. Other companies will have a chance to send the EU their comments and they will examine the conditions of the loan.

The government of Silvio Berlusconi announced plans to sell Alitalia in May 2008, the third attempt since January 2007. The government asked Intesa Sanpaolo to come up with a plan to improve the airline's finances. This plan was presented in August 2008. The government issued also a decree in May 2008 that would exempt Alitalia from disclosing information on this sale to the market. As a consequence the trade in Alitalia stock at the Borsa Italiana in Milan was halted indefinitely by the stock exchange authorities as of 4 June 2008. Intesa Sanpaolo devised the plan in co-operation with the Italian cabinet.

The gist of this plan was that Alitalia would file for bankruptcy, and thus be protected from its creditors. The next step of the plan was to split Alitalia in two parts. One part would contain the debts and less promising parts of the company. This part will be liquidated; the Italian government stated that the holders of Italian shares would be compensated. It was not made clear what this meant. The other part would contain the landing rights, pilots and some of the planes. This last part was to be bought by a consortium of Italian investors, and to receive an investment of €1 billion, along with new management and the guarantee of the cabinet that the company would free of the old debts of Alitalia and would merge with Air One. This consortium was called CAI, Compagnia Aerea Italiana. Air One and Alitalia together employ 17.000 employees. Minister Sacconi stated that the new company would employ 14.250 employees. Based upon this statement about 3.250 employees would lose their jobs. The new company would hold a share of about 60 percent of the Italian market. The plan also envisaged a form of partnership with an unspecified foreign carrier. The plan needed to be approved by the Italian unions. In Brussels Silvio Berlusconi said that union approval was a necessity but "no" was hardly an option.

=== 2008 – Bankruptcy ===
On 29 August 2008 the airline filed for bankruptcy protection. Under the new measures the airline will continue to fly as restructuring measures are carried out.

CAI, Compagnia Aerea Italiana, a consortium of Italian investors, came forward with a plan to take over Alitalia. CAI set several conditions to be met before they would invest in Alitalia. On Monday 8 September 2008, more than half of the workers' unions at Alitalia rejected the new productivity-linked contracts offered by CAI. These new contracts were a condition for the takeover to go ahead. The wage decrease of at least 25% was also not acceptable to the unions. The unions rejected the proposals after a meeting with Rocco Sabelli, the designated managing director, and labour ministry officials. The government set a deadline for acceptance by the unions as Thursday the 11th of September 2008. On Friday 12 September CAI broke off negotiations with the unions. CAI stated "that after seven days of meetings, there aren't the conditions to continue negotiations."

The Italian government convinced CAI and the unions to renegotiate during the weekend of 13 September 2008. The negotiations dragged on through Thursday the 18th. CAI improved their offer by decreasing the wage cut for the crew, and also the number of layoffs. Three of the nine unions accepted this offer, but six of them (including the unions of the crew and the pilots) did not. CAI set a new deadline of 15.50 Thursday 18 September. Some of the unions reacted with a proposal to renegotiate. On 22 September CAI withdrew their buyout offer. Alitalia published a notice in four newspapers (3 Italian newspapers and 1 British) on Tuesday 23 September 2008 seeking offers to buy any or all parts of its assets.

=== 2008 – Union negotiations ===
Prime-minister Silvio Berlusconi forced a meeting on 25 September 2008 of Alitalia's unions and the Italian investor CAI. He hoped to be able to close a deal between CAI and the unions. Berlusconi stated on September 24 that "Italy needs a national carrier and that it is inconceivable that foreign carriers would be responsible for air transport in Italy". Berlusconi also said that Italy must "continue to have its own flag carrier," and that "there is no possibility of any foreign airline taking upon itself the burden and responsibility of all of Alitalia. This hypothesis doesn't exist and never has."

On Thursday September 25, 2008 the largest union CGIL agreed with the buyout plan of CAI. CGIL claims to have won some concessions of CAI, mainly no or less wage cut for the lowest paid workers. The negotiations continue to get the support of unions representing pilots and flight assistants. CAI set a deadline for these unions by October 15. The Italian flight authority Ente Nazionale per l'Aviazione Civile (ENAC) had withdrawn their threat to suspend the license of Alitalia since the risk of financial instability of Alitalia had now significantly decreased.

On Monday September 29 the last union of Alitalia agreed to the buyout plan of CAI. The CEO of CAI said that Alitalia would start seeking for an international partner. CAI, Compagnia Aerea Italiana presented a binding offer of 1.1 billion euro to Alitalia's bankruptcy administrator on Friday October 30, 2008 to acquire the airline, pressing ahead despite refusal by some pilots and flight attendants' unions to sign on to the rescue plan. The binding offer by CAI calls for cutting aircraft, routes, workers and infusion of nearly 1.1 billion euros, including the price for the take over, (nearly $1.3 billion). The negotiations between CAI and the unions were tense. A breakthrough came after last-minute talks at the premier's office.

The offer had these conditions:

1. obtaining a provision from the competent Antitrust Authority confirming the compatibility of the operation, notified in compliance with current legislation, stating that there are no commitments or measures that differ from those proposed by the Purchaser, or which turn out to be incompatible with the Business Plan put forward by the Purchaser, or which involve a substantial change in the agreed contract terms;
2. obtaining a provision from the European Commission stating that any State aid, according to article 87 and the EEC Treaty, made for the benefit of the AZ Group before the contract was stipulated, does not involve any obligation of repayment by the Purchaser;
3. that no element of State aid, according to article 87 and the EEC Treaty, is involved in the forecasts and/or execution of the contract;
4. that, following the appointment of a Monitoring Trustee by the European Commission, no contestations, objections or reserves are raised regarding the operation of the contract or its specific means or conditions, such as to cause significant prejudice for the Purchaser.

=== 2008 – European Union intervention ===
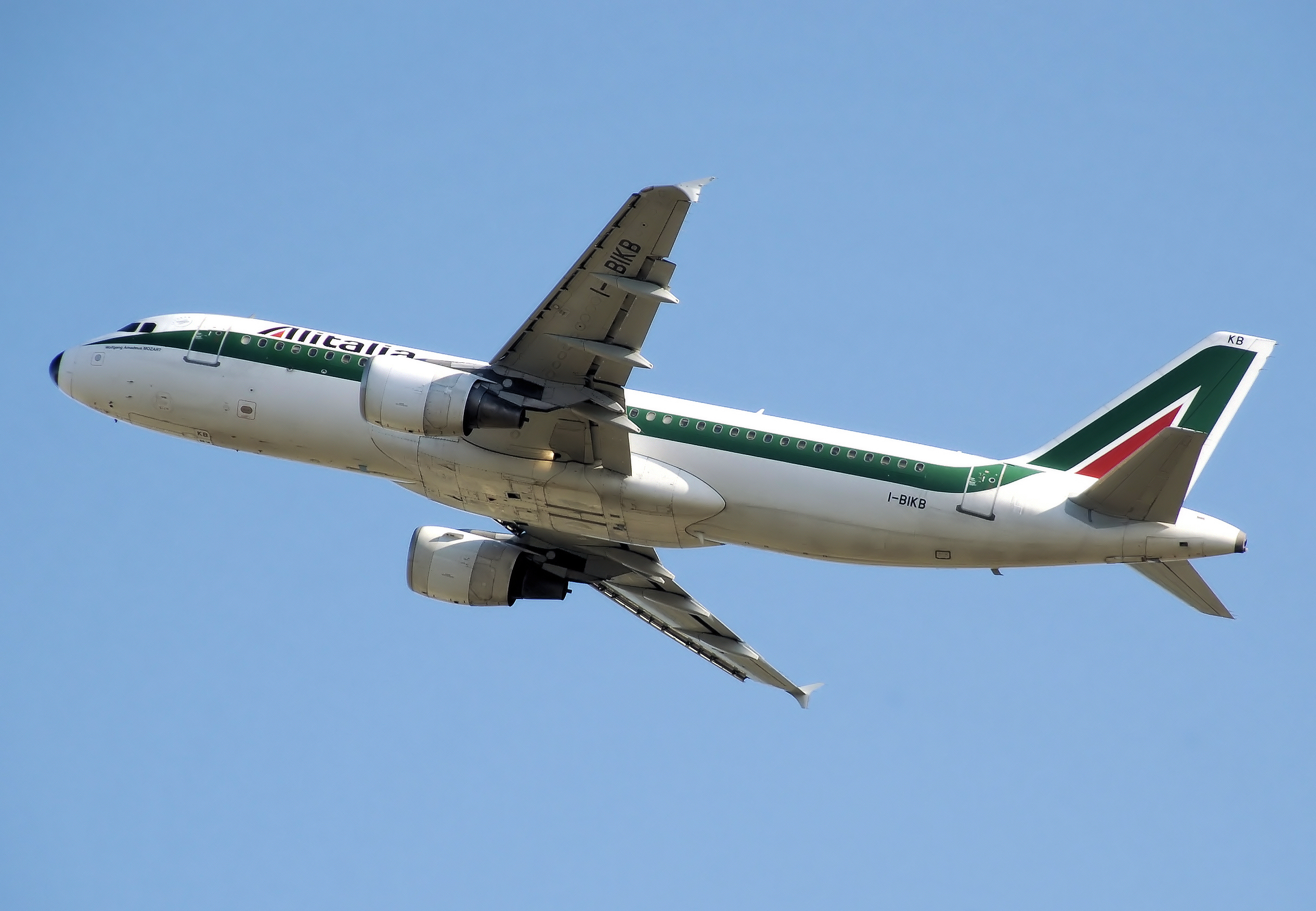
Alitalia Airbus A320-200 takes off from London Heathrow Airport, England (2008)

CAI stated that the offer, with its "ambitious but realistic" plan for turning Alitalia around, stands, assuming the European Commission doesn't lay down obstacles on antitrust grounds. CAI also said that it was searching for a partnership with a major airline group, possibly as a partner. Air France-KLM and Lufthansa have been courted.

On the 12th of November 2008 the EU decided that the €300 million bridging loan was illegal and had to be paid back to the Italian government by Alitalia, not by CAI.

The Italian government and the bankruptcy administrator have agreed to the CAI take over offer on 19 November 2008. CAI is paying €427 million in cash and taking on €625 million in Alitalia debts.

On 30 November 2008 Alitalia Group had a net debt of €1.228bn and the available cash was €250mn. The net debt of Alitalia had decreased €20 million since October 2008.

The EU and the Italian antitrust authority agreed on the sale of Alitalia to CAI on the 4th and 3 December 2008. The EU stated that the sale was at a fair market value. The Italian antitrust authority saw no objections to the take over but some minor ones.

The profitable assets of Alitalia were transferred to CAI on December 12, 2008, when CAI paid the offered sum. CAI is liable for all Alitalia expenses per 1 December 2008.

The bankruptcy administrator, Augusto Fantozzi, of the Italian flag-carrier Alitalia had put 46 of the airline's planes up for sale, and asked for formal expressions of interest by the end of January 2009. The 46 planes were offered in eight lots. Five of the lost will comprise aircraft from the main carrier. One of the lots will consist of two Boeing 767-300ERs; three separate lots will consist of seven Boeing MD-80s; and one other lot will consist of a single MD-80. Regional aircraft will be offered in the three remaining lots. Two lots will each consist of four ATR 72 turboprops, one featuring -200s and one featuring -500s. The third will consist of 14 Embraer ERJ-145s.

=== 2009 – Air France-KLM bought 25% ===
Air France-KLM bought 25% of Alitalia for €323 million under a cooperation accord on January 12, 2009. The French as well as the Italian boards agreed to the sale. On January 13, 2009, Alitalia restarted and merged with Air One. The new Alitalia is a private company of Compagnia Aerea Italiana (CAI) and a 25% participation of Air France-KLM.

=== Debts 2004 – 2008 ===
Table with Alitalia group's net debt and net available funds
Date	Net debt	Net available funds	Reference	Source	Remark
31 March 2004	€1.634bn	€256mn		Alitalia press release 07/30/2004	
31 January 2005	€1.776bn	€80mn		Alitalia press release 02/28/2005	
31 December 2005	€0.879bn	€1131mn		Alitalia press release 01/31/2006	
31 December 2006	€1.026bn	€726mn		Alitalia press release 01/28/2007	
31 December 2007	€1.199bn	€367mn		Alitalia press release 01/30/2008	
31 January 2008	€1.280bn	€282mn		Alitalia press release 02/29/2008	
28 February 2008	€1.368bn	€180mn		Alitalia press release 03/28/2008	
31 March 2008	€1.353bn	€180mn		Alitalia press release 04/30/2008	The debt decreased since February 2008 for the sum of €79 million arising from the sale of Air France KLM shares and the fiscal credit of €69 million received on 2 April 2008.
30 April 2008	€1.358bn	€174mn		Alitalia press release 05/30/2008	
31 May 2008	€1.121bn	€388mn		Alitalia press release 06/30/2008	The amount of net available funds had risen due to the bridging loan of the Italian government to Alitalia of €300 million. The net debt of Alitalia had fallen €232 million. This decrease is not related to the € 300mn bridging loan since it is not possible to determine how much of the loan will be used.
30 June 2008	€1.115bn	€375mn		Alitalia press release 07/31/2008	The net debt of Alitalia had fallen €6 million. This decrease is not related to the €300m bridging loan since it is not possible to determine how much of the loan will be used.
31 July 2008	€1.172bn	€314mn		Alitalia press release 08/29/2008	The net debt of Alitalia had risen €57 million. The €300 million cashed in May 2008 is not included in the indebtedness mentioned above, since it was added to net equity.
31 August 2008	€1.246bn	€229mn		Alitalia press release 10/20/2008	The net debt of Alitalia Group had risen €85 million. The €300 million cashed in May 2008 is not included in the indebtedness mentioned above, since it was added to net equity.
30 September 2008	€1.199bn	€245mn		Alitalia press release 10/31/2008	The net debt of Alitalia Group had decreased €47 million. The €300 million cashed in May 2008 is not included in the indebtedness mentioned above, since it was added to net equity.
31 October 2008	€1.248bn	€229mn		Alitalia press release 11/28/2008	The net debt of Alitalia Group had increased €49 million. The €300 million cashed in May 2008 is not included in the indebtedness mentioned above, since it was added to net equity.
30 November 2008	€1.228bn	€250mn		Alitalia press release 12/31/2008	The net debt of Alitalia Group had decreased €20 million. The €300 million cashed in May 2008 is not included in the indebtedness mentioned above, since it was added to net equity.
1 December 2008				Alitalia SPA was split in two parts. The viable part of Alitalia was bought by CAI and merged with Air One. As of December 1, 2008 Alitalia is a privately held company. Financial statements of the part of Alitalia bought by CAI will no longer be made public.	

Table with Alitalia group's results
Year	Operating result	Net result	Workforce on 31 December	Traffic revenue	Reference	Source	Remark
2006	-€466mn	-€627mn	11,430	€4,373mn		Alitalia press release 27/05/2008	
2007	-€310mn	-€495mn	11,172	€4,354mn		Alitalia press release 27/05/2008	

=== 2021 – End of the business ===
In August 2021 Alitalia announced that It would stopping ticket sales, as a consequence, interrupting flight activities starting from October 15, 2021. The announcement followed the sale of the ‘Aviation’ branch of ‘Alitalia - Società Aerea Italiana Spa’ to the fully public owned company Italia Trasporto Aereo S.p.A. The new formed carrier Italia Trasporto Aereo (ITA) would be the new Italian national carrier.
