= Vincenzo Visco =

Italian politician and economist (born 1942)

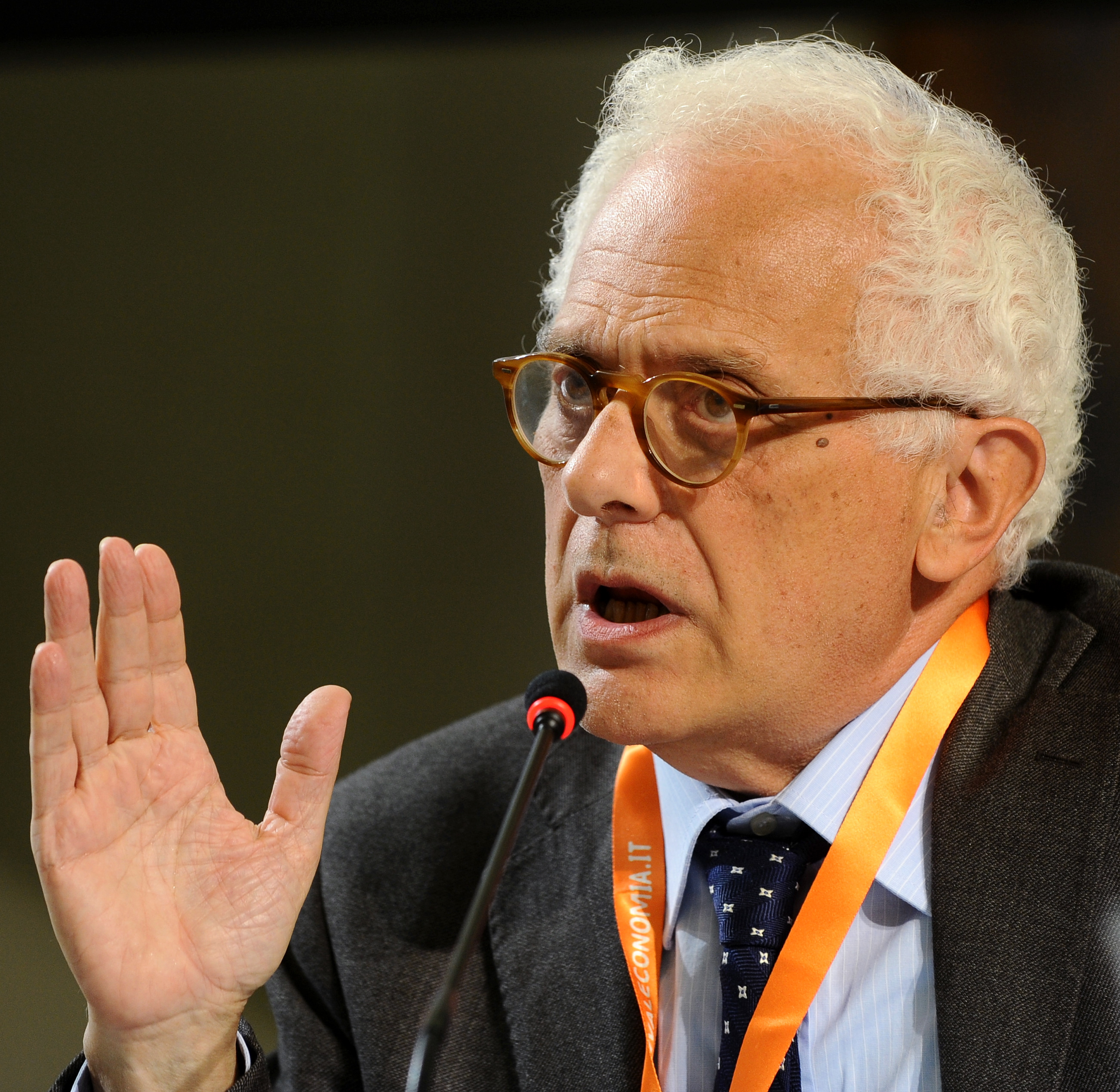
- Visco in 2013

Minister of Finance
- In office 29 April 1993 – 4 May 1993
- Prime Minister: Carlo Azeglio Ciampi
- Preceded by: Franco Reviglio
- Succeeded by: Franco Gallo
- In office 18 May 1996 – 26 April 2000
- Prime Minister: Romano Prodi; Massimo D'Alema
- Preceded by: Augusto Fantozzi
- Succeeded by: Ottaviano Del Turco

Minister of Treasury, Budget and Economic Planning
- In office 25 April 2000 – 10 June 2001
- Prime Minister: Giuliano Amato
- Preceded by: Giuliano Amato
- Succeeded by: Giulio Tremonti (Economy and Finance)

Member of the Senate of the Republic
- In office 23 April 1992 – 14 April 1994

Member of the Chamber of Deputies
- In office 12 July 1983 – 23 April 1992
- In office 14 April 1994 – 28 April 2008

Personal details
- Born: 18 March 1942 (age 84) Foggia, Kingdom of Italy
- Party: PDS (1991-1998); DS (1998–2007); PD (2007–2017); Art1 (2017–2023)
- Education: Sapienza University of Rome
- Profession: University professor

Vincenzo Alfonso Visco (Italian pronunciation: [vinˈtʃɛntso ˈvisko]; born 18 March 1942) is an Italian politician and economist who has served as a government minister.

== Biography ==
Visco gained an MSc in Economics at the University of York in 1969 and was awarded an honorary degree in 2004.

Visco was elected to the Italian Parliament in 1983 for the Sinistra Indipendente group, joining the Democratic Party of the Left in 1991, the Democrats of the Left in 1998 and the Democratic Party in 2007. He served as Italian Minister of Finance for a few days in 1993 and then again from 1996 to 2000 and Treasury Minister from 2000 to 2001. He returned to government in 2006 as Vice-Minister of Economy, a role in which he courted controversy. He was accused of using his political influence to benefit Unipol in a bank takeover, although he was cleared of any illegal activity. He also hit the headlines in this role when he described the country's debt as "a disaster". One of his final acts in this role was to publish the tax details of every Italian citizen for 2005 in a move he described as 'an act of transparency, of democracy, similar to what happens elsewhere in the world'.
