= Domenico Siniscalco =

Italian economist and politician (born 1954)

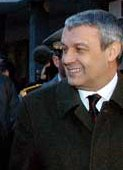

Minister of Economy and Finance
- In office 16 July 2004 – 22 September 2005
- Prime Minister: Silvio Berlusconi
- Preceded by: Silvio Berlusconi (Acting)
- Succeeded by: Giulio Tremonti

Personal details
- Born: 15 July 1954 (age 72) Turin, Italy
- Party: None
- Education: University of Turin

Domenico Siniscalco (born 15 July 1954) is an Italian economist and former Minister of Finance.

Sinicalco graduated with law degree from the University of Turin. He served Italian government from June 2001 to July 2004 as Director General of Treasury. He took office as the Italian Minister of Economy and Finance on 16 July 2004 until 22 September 2005.

Along with Tommaso Padoa Schioppa, he is not part of any significant political party preferring to remain independent. Siniscalco is Vice Chairman of Morgan Stanley Europe and Head of Italy's division at the same investment bank.

FAMILY: sposato con Cristina MARENCO DI MORIONDO il 20 gennaio 1996 a Paderno Dugnano ha due figli Marco 11 ottobre 1997 ed Enrico 02 aprile 1999

== Bibliography ==
- Mr. Tommaso Padoa-Schioppa. Economy and Finance Minister of the Republic of Italy. tesoro.it
