= Giulio Tremonti =

Italian politician (born 1947)

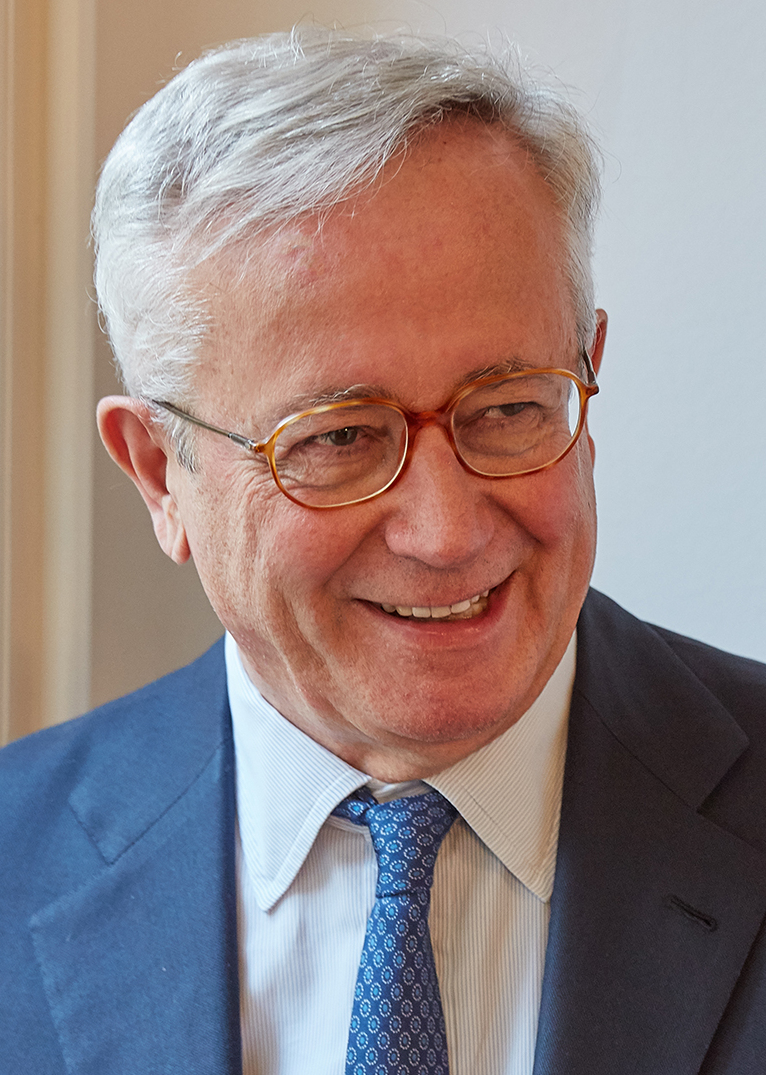

Minister of Economy and Finance
- In office 8 May 2008 – 16 November 2011
- Prime Minister: Silvio Berlusconi
- Preceded by: Tommaso Padoa-Schioppa
- Succeeded by: Mario Monti
- In office 22 September 2005 – 17 May 2006
- Prime Minister: Silvio Berlusconi
- Preceded by: Domenico Siniscalco
- Succeeded by: Tommaso Padoa-Schioppa
- In office 11 June 2001 – 3 July 2004
- Prime Minister: Silvio Berlusconi
- Preceded by: Vincenzo Visco (Treasury and Budget); Ottaviano Del Turco (Finance)
- Succeeded by: Domenico Siniscalco

Deputy Prime Minister of Italy
- In office 23 April 2005 – 8 May 2006 Serving with Gianfranco Fini
- Prime Minister: Silvio Berlusconi
- Preceded by: Gianfranco Fini
- Succeeded by: Massimo D'Alema; Francesco Rutelli

Minister of Finance
- In office 10 May 1994 – 17 January 1995
- Prime Minister: Silvio Berlusconi
- Preceded by: Franco Gallo
- Succeeded by: Augusto Fantozzi

Member of the Chamber of Deputies
- Incumbent
- Assumed office 13 October 2022
- Constituency: Lombardy
- In office 15 April 1994 – 14 March 2013
- Constituency: Lombardy (1994–2001); Veneto (2001–2006); Calabria (2006–2008); Lombardy (2008–2013)

Member of the Senate of the Republic
- In office 15 March 2013 – 22 March 2018
- Constituency: Lombardy

Personal details
- Born: 18 August 1947 (age 79) Sondrio, Italy
- Party: FdI (since 2022)
- Other political affiliations: PSI (1987–1993); PS (1993–1994); FI (1994–2009); PdL (2009–2012); 3L (2012–2013); Renaissance (2017–2018)
- Height: 1.73 m (5 ft 8 in)
- Education: University of Pavia
- Profession: Lawyer; Tax advisor

Giulio Tremonti (Italian pronunciation: [ˈdʒuːljo treˈmonti]; born 18 August 1947) is an Italian politician. He served in the government of Italy as Minister of Economy and Finance under Prime Minister Silvio Berlusconi from 1994 to 1995, from 2001 to 2004, from 2005 to 2006, and from 2008 to 2011.

== Early life ==
Tremonti was born in Sondrio, Northern Lombardy, in a family of Venetian and Campanian ancestry (his father was from Lorenzago di Cadore, in the Province of Belluno, and his mother from Benevento). He is a full professor of law at the University of Pavia, Italy, and has been a visiting professor at the Institute of Comparative Law, Oxford. His particular fields of interest are fiscal and tributary law, as well as fiscal policies.

== Political career ==
Tremonti was the man who facilitated the dialogue between billionaire entrepreneur/politician Silvio Berlusconi and Umberto Bossi, leader of the federalist Northern League and a friend of Tremonti's, leading to the formation of the center-right coalition House of Freedoms. Although a member of Forza Italia, on many issues he is closer to the League. In particular, he is a staunch political and fiscal federalist, supporting a federal reform of the Italian political system and more autonomy for Lombardy and Veneto, where he has his core supporters.

He first ran for the Italian Parliament in 1987 with the Italian Socialist Party (PSI).

=== Minister of Finance ===
Elected for the first time in 1994 for the Pact for Italy, he switched his allegiance to center-right Forza Italia soon after the Parliament held session, and obtained the finance position in the first Berlusconi cabinet.

Tremonti again served as finance minister starting in 2001, when Berlusconi came back to power. He was compelled to resign on 3 July 2004, after internal disputes about the economic situation of the country within the House of Freedoms, particularly with conservative National Alliance. In late 2005 he was then reappointed to the same position for the third time after his substitute Domenico Siniscalco resigned until the end of the Berlusconi III Cabinet. At the 2008 general elections, Berlusconi came back to power with a large majority in the parliament and assigned Tremonti the Economics and Finances position. At the end of 2011, following some rumours Tremonti would close to leave Pdl and to adhere to the Northern League. On 5 September 2012 Tremonti announced that he was setting up his own political movement ahead of elections to be held by next spring, potentially syphoning support from Silvio Berlusconi's People of Freedom party.

During his time in office, Tremonti made the first and biggest across the board Income tax cuts in Italy by introducing a No-Tax-Area (2003) and reducing the top marginal tax rate (2005). He also made a significant reduction in the corporate tax rate (from 36% to 33%, then further down to 27.5%) and has abolished taxes on reinvested profits. He has also completely abolished all donation taxes, estate/inheritance taxes (2001), and property taxes on housing/real estate (2008) at the national level (property continues to be taxed at the local level). Nevertheless, after these measures, the OECD stated in its latest (2007) report on Italy that "tax rates are high compared to other countries". He has been the promoter of the Global Legal Standards.

From 2008 until 2009, Tremonti was a member of the High Level Taskforce on Innovative International Financing for Health Systems, co-chaired by Gordon Brown and Robert Zoellick.

== Other activities ==
As an author, during his life, Tremonti has written mostly on taxation and international trade. He expressed how high taxes are a drag on growth and how fiscal federalism can create territorial taxation competition between regions that can reduce the burden on families and workers. He has also been a critic of China's dumping trade policy that causes delocalization of jobs from Europe to Asia. Nevertheless, he gave an important lecture at the Central Party School of the Chinese Communist Party in 2009.

He is currently a member of the Italy-USA Foundation, chairman of the Aspen Institute Italia and a frequent guest columnist on the Corriere della Sera. As of September 2020, he is a member of the Italian Aspen Institute.

== Electoral history ==
Election	House	Constituency	Party	Votes	Result	Notes
1983	Chamber of Deputies	Milan–Pavia	PSI	332	Not elected	
1994	Chamber of Deputies	Sondrio	PS	18,878	Not elected	
1994	Chamber of Deputies	Lombardy 1	PS	– (Note: Elected in a closed list proportional representation system.)	Elected	
1996	Chamber of Deputies	Belluno	FI	24,163	Not elected	
1996	Chamber of Deputies	Lombardy 2	FI	–	Elected	
2001	Chamber of Deputies	Veneto 1	FI	–	Elected	
2006	Chamber of Deputies	Calabria	FI	–	Elected	
2008	Chamber of Deputies	Lombardy 2	PdL	–	Elected	
2013	Senate of the Republic	Lombardy	LN	–	Elected	
2022	Chamber of Deputies	Milan–Buenos Aires–Venezia	FdI	71,902	Not elected	
2022	Chamber of Deputies	Lombardy 1	FdI	–	Elected	

== Books on economics and finances ==
- La fiera delle tasse ("The Tax Fair", 1991) ISBN 978-88-15-03334-5
- Il federalismo fiscale ("Fiscal Federalism", 1994)
- Il fantasma della povertà ("The Phantom of Poverty", 1995) ISBN 978-88-04-40066-0
- Le cento tasse degli italiani ("The Hundred Taxes of Italians", 1996, with G. Vitaletti)
- Lo Stato criminogeno ("The crime-generating State", 1997) ISBN 978-88-420-5298-2
- Rischi fatali – L’Europa vecchia, la Cina, il mercatismo suicida: come reagire ("Fatal risks: Old Europe, China, the Suicidal Free Market Ideology: How to React", 2005) ISBN 978-88-04-55011-2
- La paura e la speranza - Europa : la crisi globale che si avvicina e la via per superarla ("Fear and hope - Europe: crisis approaching and the way to overcome it", 2008) ISBN 978-88-04-58066-9

Political offices
Preceded by Franco Gallo	Minister of Finance; 1994–1995	Succeeded by Augusto Fantozzi
Preceded by Vincenzo Visco (Treasury and Budget); Ottaviano Del Turco (Finance)	Minister of Economy and Finance; 2001–2004	Succeeded by Silvio Berlusconi (Acting)
Preceded by Domenico Siniscalco	Minister of Economy and Finance; 2005–2006	Succeeded by Tommaso Padoa-Schioppa
Preceded by Gianfranco Fini	Deputy Prime Minister of Italy; 2005–2006	Succeeded by Massimo D'Alema; Francesco Rutelli
Preceded by Tommaso Padoa-Schioppa	Minister of Economy and Finance; 2008–2011	Succeeded by Mario Monti
