= Chatham House Rule =

System for holding debates and discussions

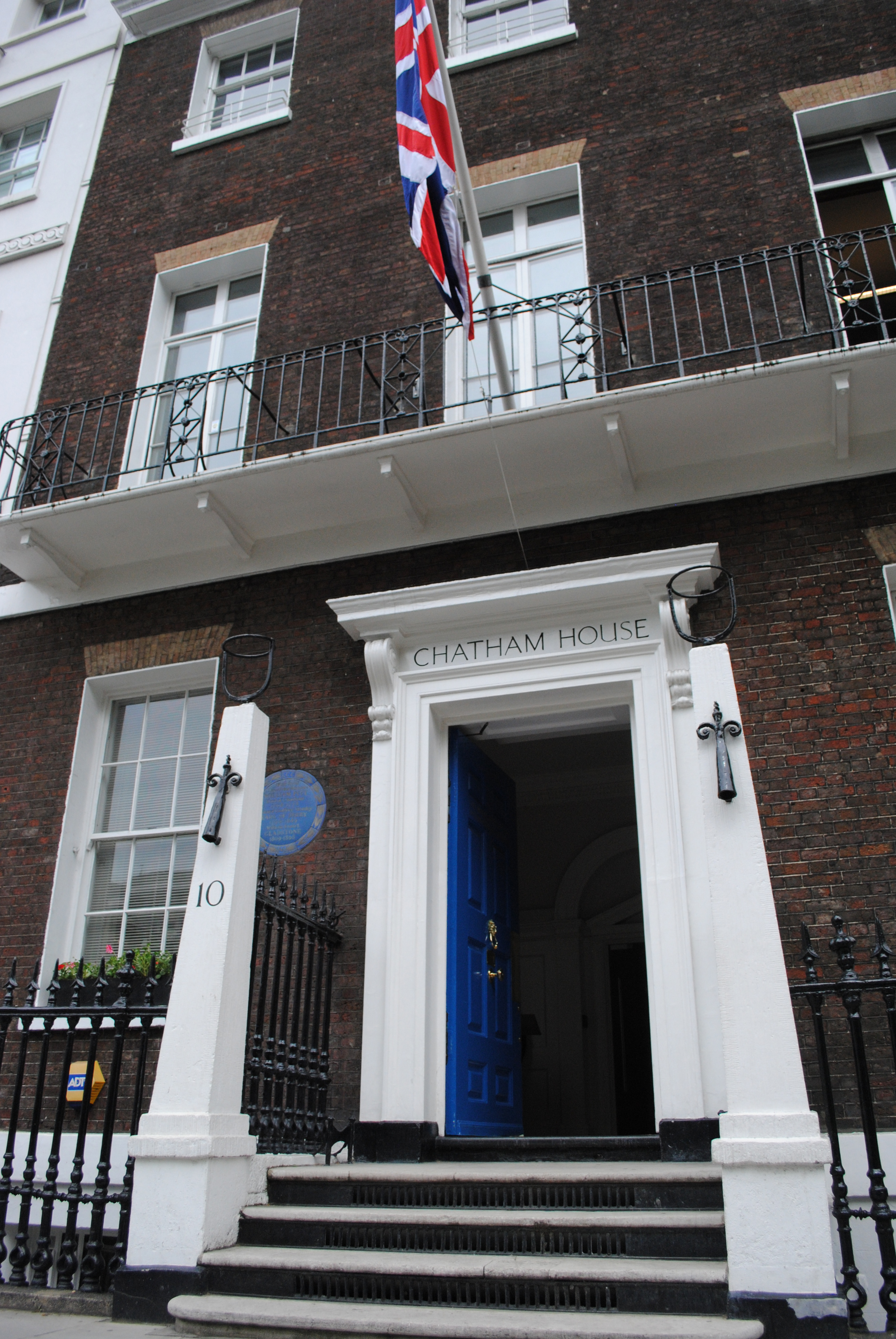
Chatham House in London

Under the Chatham House Rule, anyone who comes to a meeting is free to use information from the discussion, but is not allowed to reveal who made any particular comment. It is designed to increase openness of discussion. The rule is a system for holding debates and discussion panels on controversial topics, named after Chatham House, the London headquarters of the Royal Institute of International Affairs, where the rule originated in June 1927.

== The rule ==
The rule was created in 1927 and refined in 1992 and 2002. The rule states:

When a meeting, or part thereof, is held under the Chatham House Rule, participants are free to use the information received, but neither the identity nor the affiliation of the speaker(s), nor that of any other participant, may be revealed.

Although sometimes referred to as Chatham House Rules, Chatham House states that the singular should be used as there is only one rule.

== Purpose ==
The rule aims to foster open dialogue on public policy and current affairs. It enables individuals to express and debate controversial opinions without risking their professional standing and establishes a clear distinction between personal views and those of their employer.

The original rule of 1927 was refined in October 1992 and again in 2002. Chatham House has translated the rule into Arabic, Chinese, French, German, Portuguese, Russian, and Spanish.

== Use ==
=== European Central Bank ===
The European Central Bank (ECB) sometimes adopts the Chatham House Rule. In May 2015, release of a speech, which adhered to the rule, by ECB board member Benoît Cœuré caused divided opinion as to its use and his self-publication. The Cœuré speech affected currency, and stock and bond markets. Thereafter, ECB invocations of the rule for a question-and-answer session and opening remarks for Cœuré, respectively, by Vice President Vítor Constâncio and fellow board member Peter Praet, gained attention. An ECB governing council member Boštjan Jazbec also had, the same month, convened questions-and-answers, under the rule.

=== Bilderberg Group ===
The Bilderberg Group uses the Chatham House Rule for its annual conferences, which feature between 120 and 150 prominent politicians, CEOs, national security experts, academics, and journalists invited by the group's steering committee. The practice has been criticized by some commentators, who view the conferences as a means for policymakers to make decisions without public accountability.

=== Other groups ===
- Romney Street Group

== See also ==
- Journalism sourcing
- Sub rosa
- Whistleblower
