= Autorité de la concurrence =

Competition regulator in France

Coordinates: 48°51′52″N 2°20′04″E

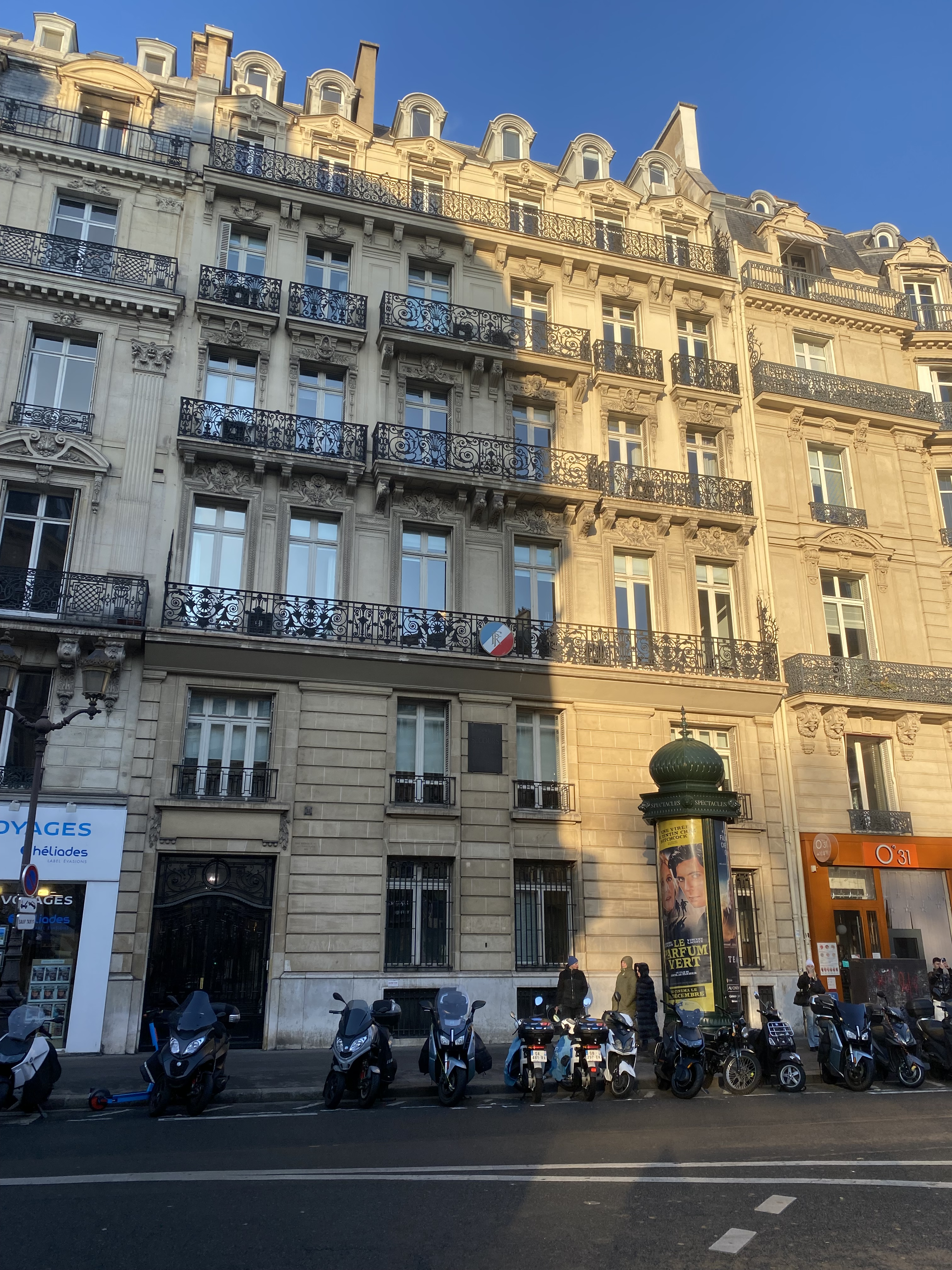
Building at 11, rue de l'Échelle in Paris, seat of the Competition Authority

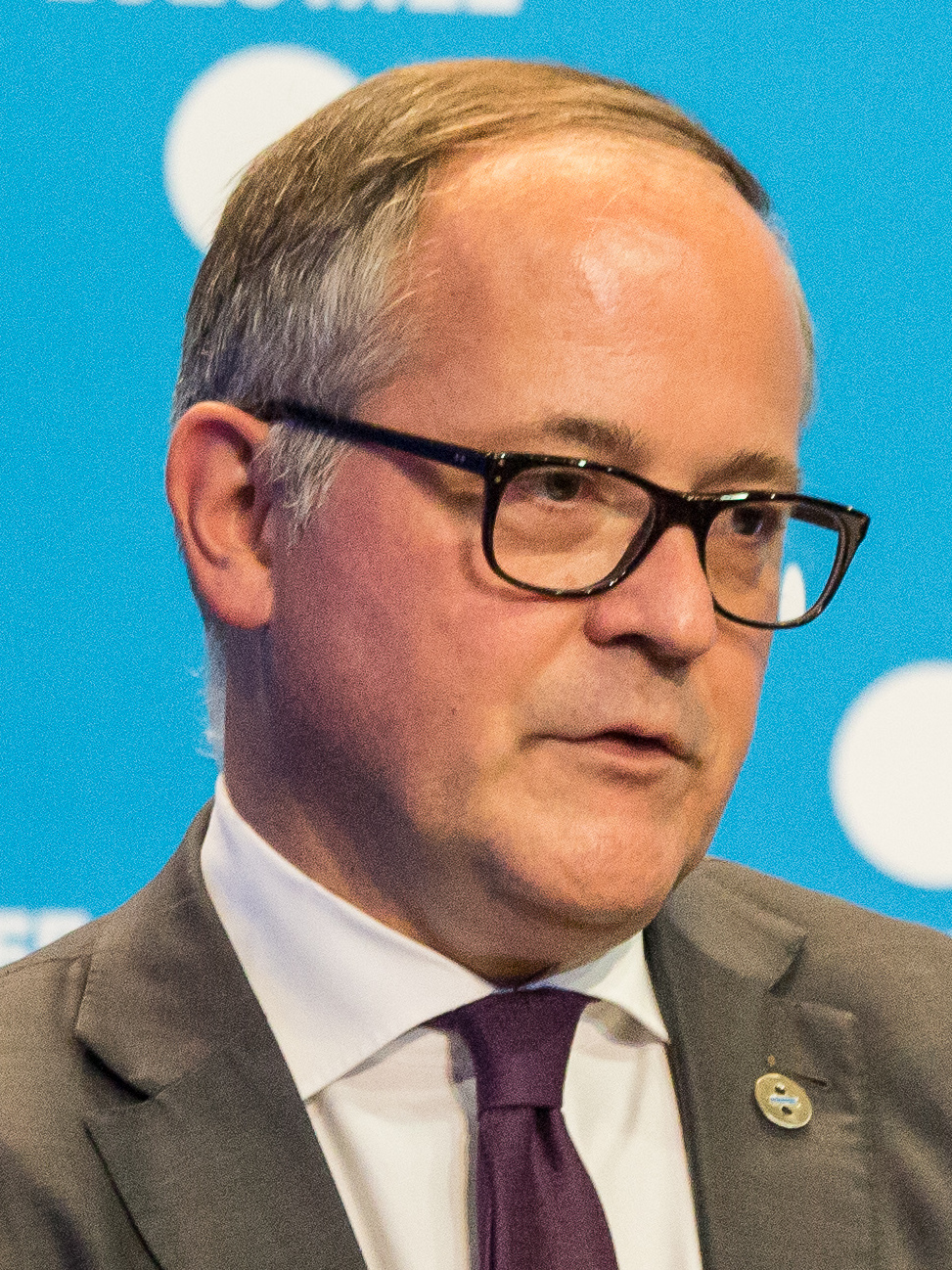
Benoît Cœuré has led the French Competition Authority since January 2022

The Autorité de la concurrence (French for 'Competition Authority'; French: [ɔtɔʁite də la kɔ̃kyʁɑ̃s]) is France's national competition regulator. Its predecessor, the Competition Council, was established in the 1950s. The Competition Authority is an Independent administrative authority, responsible for preventing anti-competitive practices and monitoring the functioning of markets. It aims to ensure respect for the law linked "to the defense of a sufficient market competition".

Although it is not considered a court, it pronounces injunctions, makes decisions, and if necessary, imposes penalties, subject to appeal to the Court of Appeal of Paris and the Court of Cassation. It also issues opinions.

The main sources of law of its action are the Commercial Code (Book IV) and Articles 101 and 102 of the Treaty on the Functioning of the European Union. Its headquarters are in Paris, at 11 Rue de l'Echelle (some services such as the concentrations or the economy are at 6 avenue de l'Opéra)

== History ==
Created by a decree of 9 August 1953 in the form of a commission attached to the Minister for the Economy, the Competition Council, as its name officially by the order of December 1, 1986 has become, since January 13, 2009 and according to the law of 4 August 2008 on modernization of the economy, the Competition Authority. His powers have been gradually extended, including the law of 15 March 2001 on new economic regulations (NRE Act) to meet the control objective of the proper competitive functioning of the market.

=== The technical commission agreements and dominant positions ===
==== The political will to fight against cartels ====
In the early 1950s, in an economic context and directed nationalized since the Great Depression 2, as well as agreements with professional way since the Second World War with the Vichy regime and the German planning of the French economy the government attention focuses on anti-competitive practices. The persistence of corporatist practices, after the Vichy regime, helping to change the vision of the government on the effects of horizontal agreements between competitors 3.

The government decided to take measures against price fixing 4, down the price system set by the administration since Ordinance No. 45-1483 of 30 June 1945 adopted in the aftermath of the war. Thus, Law No 52-835 of 18 July 1952 enriches the list of anti-competitive practices in the order of 30 June 1945.

In 1953, both Houses of Parliament tear around the passage of a law establishing the status of cartels. In January 1950, a bill introduced by Henri Teitgen is the establishment of a specialized court for review of agreements to curb unlawful agreements but to allow those deemed consistent with the public interest 3. Other projects submitted tend to amend Articles 419 and 420 of the penal code to punish agreements. Asked for an opinion, to inform parliamentary debates 5, the Economic Council (forerunner of the present EESC) rejects the draft Henri Teitgen, due to the exorbitant powers of its specialized jurisdiction of the project and in the absence of judicial redress against its decisions.

The resistance of both Houses encourages the government to override opposition parliamentarians 4 : Article 7 of the Framework Law No. 53-611 of 11 July 1953 empowers the government to take measures "to maintain or restore a free industrial and commercial competition" 6, according to the practice of decree laws in force under the Fourth Republic. The French legislation also seemed upset with the Havana Charter.

==== Creation of the commission by the decree of 9 August 1953 ====
As part of the policy of "economic and financial recovery" conducted by the Government of Joseph Laniel, was adopted on the basis of the aforementioned law decree No. 53-704 of 9 August 1953, to "put an end to practices that by restricting fair trade competition, oppose any price drop" 7. The decree establishes the principle of "prohibition of all practices that thwart the full exercise of competition by opposing the lowering of cost prices or selling prices". This Order amends the order of 30 June 1945 which established a price system directed to curb high inflation.

To punish these offenses, is created a technical commission agreements, composed of members of the State Council, judges of the Supreme Court and the Court of Auditors, as well as qualified persons, attached to the Minister of economy. This committee is responsible for examining possible violations of rules prohibiting cartels, and appreciates the possible justifications that were made to them. Entering either the ordinary courts or by the Minister of Economy, the Technical Commission of the agreements provides an opinion to the minister who has the exclusive power to transmit or not the case to the prosecutor or impose fines. The technical commission agreements is then an external expert body 8 with the aim to inform decisions of the Minister for the Economy 9.

The decree, adopted on the report of Edgar Faure, stems from an initiative of the Director of prices, Louis Franck, who obtained the Secretary of State for Trade introducing a device to fight against cartels, while the attention of the latter is rather addressed the discriminatory practices and price fixing 3.

The inaugural session of the Technical Commission of the agreements was held on April 9, 1954, but it was not until 23 April 1955 that really began consideration by the board, business submitted to it for review 2.

==== Extension of the competence of the technical committee to dominant positions ====
Law n ° 63-628 of 2 July 1963 supplementary budget for 1963 extends the jurisdiction of the Technical Commission of the agreements with the dominant positions of practices characterized by "a monopoly or a manifest concentration of economic power, when these activities the object or may have the effect of impeding the normal operation of the market " (Article 3) 10.

=== The Competition Commission (1977–1986) ===
Following the first oil crisis in 1973, which deeply undermines the planning approach adopted in France since the Liberation, the second government of Raymond Barre progressively reduced price controls. Several laws will strengthen the framework of the French competition law.

Law n ° 77-806 of 19 July 1977 creates the Competition Commission, and extends its jurisdiction on two points. Henceforth, the Competition Commission knows in an advisory capacity to "all questions concerning competition referred to it by the Government", and advises on transactions or projects of concentration. In an Assembly decision of 13 March 1981, the Council of State denied him the jurisdiction of qualifying, but the class as "administrative agency". Subsequently, Law No. 85-1408 of 30 December 1985 on improving competition qualifies for the first time the Commission of "independent administrative authority".

=== The Competition Council (1986–2009) ===
==== The establishment of the Competition Council by the order of December 1, 1986 ====
Following the political change of 1986, resulting in the first cohabitation, Ordinance No. 86-1243 of December 1, 1986 repeals the provisions of the Ordinance of 30 June 1945 which established an administrative price control. Now prices are "freely determined by competition". The ordinance establishes the Competition Council consisting of sixteen members, appointed for a term of six years on a proposal of the Minister of Economy.

The Competition Council now has its own power of decision and sanctions on anticompetitive practices, although the power of decision in economic concentrations still held by the Minister of Economy, the Competition Council did in this case an advisory role.

The ordinance introduced other important innovations, namely enlargement, especially to businesses, Council referral opportunities, transferring the sanctioning power of the Minister Council in the economy, together with a control of the judicial court and a better procedure guaranteeing the rights of interested parties.

The law ratifying the order of December 1, 1986 provided for the transfer of contentious decisions of the Competition Council to the judicial judge, notwithstanding the traditional jurisprudential criteria that would have involved the jurisdiction of administrative courts. Seized under its constitutional review, the Constitutional Council clears the fundamental principle recognized by the laws of the Republic that "with the exception of matters reserved by nature to the judiciary, is ultimately the responsibility of the administrative court the annulment or alteration of decisions taken in the exercise of public powers by the authorities exercising executive power, agents, local authorities of the Republic or public bodies under their authority or control" (decision No. 86-224 DC of 23 January 1987).

==== Successive expansion of the powers of the Competition Council ====
From 1986, the Competition Council sees its gradually extended powers. Law No. 92-1282 of 11 December 1992 empowers the Council to do under Articles 85 to 87 of the Treaty of Rome, which include prohibitions of dominant positions and agreements 17. LawGalland of 1 July 1996 expands the adjudicatory functions of the Competition Council to predatory pricing 18.

The law New Economic Regulations (called NRE) of 15 May 2001 introduced numerous procedural innovations for the benefit of the Competition Council: the latter may enter into transactions with sanctioned companies, or make use of leniency procedures 19.

The law 2003-706 of August 1, 2003 of Financial Security integrates the control of bank mergers in the common competition law, by giving the Minister of Economy and when asked for an opinion to the Council competition, the authority to deal with competition problems that would arise for bank mergers 20.

=== Since 2009 the Competition Authority ===
The law modernizing the economy of 4 August 2008 transfer to the new Competition Authority all the old powers of the Competition Council, by adding new skills. Some of these changes were advocated by the Attali Commission and by the OECD, in that they were intended to enhance efficiency in competitive market regulation 21.

==== Transfer of control of concentrations ====
One of the great innovations of the law modernizing the economy of 4 August 2008 (Article 96) is to transfer to the new Competition Authority, established as an independent administrative authority, control of concentrations 22. This reform helps to bring the French model of regulation of competition from that in force in other states in Europe, entrusting to an independent authority specialized control of these operations 23.

Now, subject to criteria related to turnover of the undertakings concerned (which would result if any competence of the European Commission), the Competition Authority is the competent authority of common law in this area. The Minister of Economy may, however, once the decision of the Commission made, discuss and approve the transaction in question for "reasons of general interest other than maintaining competition" into such industrial development, the competitiveness of enterprises in question in the light of international competition or the creation or maintenance of employment 24.

==== Possibility of issuing opinions and recommendations ====
The LME Act allows the Competition Authority on its own initiative in opinion on any competition issue and make recommendations to improve the market competition to the Minister responsible for the sector 25. The opinion of the Authority are usually very noticeable, especially one made in September 2014 on concessions highway 26, 27, 28.

== Composition of the Competition Authority ==
=== President and vice-presidents ===
The president of the Competition Authority is appointed for a term of five years by decree on the report of the Minister of Economy. The chairman is appointed "because of its expertise in the legal and economic fields" 29. However, since 1963, all presidents of the administrative authority were state councilors.

The current president of the Authority Bruno Lasserre, state councilor and vice-presidents are Claire Favre, Elisabeth Flüry-Herard, Emmanuel Combe and Thierry Dahan 30.

List of presidents (since 1963)	Date mandate		Appointment order
Jean Toutée	November 26, 1963	November 12, 1971	Decree of December 7, 1963 31
Claude Lasry	November 12, 1971	1 ^{st} November 1977	Decree of November 12, 1971 32
Pierre Ordonneau	1 ^{st} November 1977	June 25, 1980	Decree of 25 October 1977 33
Jean Donnedieu de Vabres	June 25, 1980	March 14, 1986	Decree of 18 June 1980 34
Jean Ravanel	March 14, 1986	January 20, 1987	Decree of 14 March 1986 35
Pierre Laurent	January 20, 1987	March 3, 1993	Decree of 20 January 1987 36
Charles Barbeau	March 3, 1993	July 29, 1998	Decree of 3 March 1993 37
Marie-Dominique Hagelsteen	July 29, 1998	July 29, 2004	Decree of 29 July 1998 38
Bruno Lasserre	July 29, 2004	September 21, 2016	Decree of 26 July 2004 39
Isabelle de Silva	October 14, 2016		Decree of 14 October 2016 40

=== College members ===
The Competition Authority is composed of a college of 17 members, 41 appointed by decree on report of the Minister of Economy, for a period of five years (renewable term):

- President;
- six members or former members of the State Council, the Supreme Court, the Court of Auditors or other jurisdictions;
- five persons chosen for their expertise in economic, competition and consumption;
- five persons employed or formerly operating in the production sector, distribution, crafts, services or the professions.

Within the council, there is a standing committee composed of the president and four vice presidents.

The Minister of Economy called:

- a government commissioner to the Board, namely the Director General of Competition, Consumer Affairs and Fraud Control (DGCCRF).
- the general rapporteur on the proposal of the Board.

The other rapporteurs, who will present the case and the case to the Competition Authority, appointed by the General Rapporteur.

== Powers of the Competition Authority ==
=== National allocations of the Competition Authority ===
The competition law applies "to all production, distribution and services, including those that are made public persons, particularly in the context of public service delegation agreements", according to Article L. 410-1 of the commercial code. Article L. 461-1 of the Code provides that the Competition Authority "ensures free competition." As such, the Competition Authority has several skills.

==== Sanction anti competitive practices ====
The Competition Authority is mainly responsible for repressing anti-competitive business practices, including agreements and abuse of dominant position.

It may impose two sanctions:

- injunctions to stop the practice within a specified period, real non-punitive sanction.
- according to Article L.464-2 of the Commercial Code, the Competition Authority "may impose a financial penalty applicable either immediately or for breach of injunctions". The sanctions say it is proportional to the seriousness of the charges, the importance of the damage on the economy.

===== Referral to the Competition Authority =====
Several people can enter the Competition Authority.

Historically, only the Minister of the economy, companies and local authorities, professional organizations and trade unions, approved consumer organizations, and chambers of commerce and industry for the interest they charge could grasp the Authority, outside of its self-referral option. Law n ° 2012-1270 of 20 November 2012 on economic regulation overseas are added regions and communities overseas with special status.

====== Critique of self-referral to the Competition Authority ======
Section 11 of the Ordinance of 1 ^{st} December 1986 provided for the right to self-referral to the Competition Authority, transposed provision in Article L. 462-5 of the Commercial Code. This ability to self-referral has been criticized many times, because of potential damage to the impartiality of the Authority.

In a first decision Company Canal Plus Group and Vivendi Universal issued October 12, 2012 (Decision No. 2012-280 QPC), the Constitutional Council, however, felt that the right to self-referral to the Competition Authority proposed by its General rapporteur, "not [led] the authority not to prejudge the reality of breaches examine" and considered the article in question complies with the Constitution 42.

In a second decision Grands Moulins de Strasbourg SA Companies rendered October 14, 2015 (Decision No. 2015-489 QPC), the Constitutional Council ruled that the decision of the Competition Authority self-grabs, "decision which the Council exercises its supervisory role of well functioning markets, has neither the purpose nor the effect of a practice charge with a particular undertaking "; therefore, it does not lead to prejudge actual practices that may give rise to sanctions pronounced 43.

===== Sanctions may be imposed =====
In case of finding of an anti competitive practice, the Competition Authority may order offenders terminate or impose special conditions and, where appropriate, impose a financial penalty applicable either immediately or in the event of breach of injunctions or in case of non-compliance with commitments accepted 44.

If the offender is not a business, the maximum amount of the penalty is three million. The maximum amount of the penalty is for a company 10% of the worldwide turnover before tax achieved the highest during one of the years ended since the year preceding that in which the practices were implemented.

In a ruling Association Accountant Media Association issued January 7, 2016 (Decision No. 2015-510 QPC), the Constitutional Council considers that by providing maximum financial penalty in absolute value when the person who committed the offense is not a business, then this maximum is set as a percentage of revenue when that person is a company, the legislator has introduced a difference of treatment directly related to the object of the law establishing it, and that he referred to specific legal categories for determining the penalty with sufficient certainty. In doing so, the Constitutional Court dismisses the grievance ignorance of equality and principle of legality of criminal offenses and penalties 45.

Moreover, the Competition Authority may decide that the decision, in full or in excerpt will be published, distributed or displayed, the cost then being borne by the person concerned.

==== Advisory activity of the Competition Authority ====
The Competition Authority also plays an advisory role. As such, it must be consulted before any regulatory price. It can also be consulted on all matters of competition, especially when monitoring concentrations.

=== Community powers of the Competition Authority ===
==== Obligation to apply Community competition law in the event of allocation of intra-Community trade ====
The entry into force on 1 January 2004 of Regulation (EC) No 1/2003 of 16 December 2002 made it mandatory for the authorities regulating competition in the member states of the European Union, the application of Community competition rules. National competition authorities (NCAs) when they apply national law on cartels and dominant positions must also apply EU competition law to practices that are "likely to affect trade between Member States."

Regulation of 16 December 2002 is decentralizing the application of competition law in order to increase its effectiveness. This is to allow the European Commission to focus on large-scale operations, and use the capacities of national competition authorities, often better placed to hear an anti-competitive practice.

In addition, the settlement ends the exemption monopoly held by the European Commission: now, the national competition authorities may make pursuant to Article 101 paragraph 3 of the Treaty of Rome to exempt contribution agreements to economic progress.

==== The insertion of the Competition Authority from the European Competition Network (ECN) ====
Regulation 1/2003 of 16 December 2002 sets up a European Competition Network (ECN), led by the European Commission, and for the optimal application of Community competition law.

== Budget ==
In 2014, the budget of the Competition Authority amounted to €20.7 million, including 16.2 million for staff costs and EUR 4.5 million for operating expenses 46.

Year	Staff costs	Functionary costs	Total budget	Source
2014	€16.2 million	€4.5 million	€20.7 million	Activity Report 2014 47
2013	€15.9 million	€4.7 million	€20.6 million	Activity Report 2013 48
2012	€15.5 million	€4.9 million	€20.4 million	Activity Report 2012 49
2011	€15.3 million	€5.1 million	€20.4 million	Annual report 2011 50
2010	15 million €	€5.4 million	€20.4 million	Activity Report 2010 51
2009	€13.8 million	€5.5 million	€19.3 million	Annual report 2009 52
2008	€9.7 million	€3.1 million	€12.8 million	Annual report 2008 53
2007	€9.2 million	€3.1 million	€12.3 million	Annual Report 2007 54
2006	€8.9 million	€2.5 million	€11.4 million	Activity Report 2006 55
2005	€5.9 million	€2.7 million	€8.6 million	Activity Report 2005 56
2004	€5.9 million	€2.5 million	€8.5 million	Annual Report 2004 57
2003	€5.8 million	€2.8 million	€8.6 million	Activity Report 2003 58
2002	€5.7 million	€2.9 million	€8.6 million	Activity Report 2002 59

== Decisional practice of the Competition Authority ==
- 22 July 2021 : The Autorité fines several eyeglasses manufacturers for imposing retail prices to opticians.
- 24 June 2019 : The Autorité de la concurrence fines French notaries and County Court bailiffs for anti-competitive practices.
- 21 March 2017: Engie re Natural Gas and Electricity The Autorité de la concurrence fines Engie 100 million euros for breaches of L. 420-2 of the commercial code.
- December 17, 2015: Abuse of dominant position in the phone market "Enterprise" [ archive ]. The Autorité de la concurrence fines Orange (formerly France Telecom) to 350 million euros for having implemented four anti-competitive practices in the markets for fixed and mobile services to customers "business", and imposes injunctions aimed at immediately restore a situation of fair competition on these markets.
- December 8, 2011: Cartel of laundry in France
- December 20, 2007: Price agreement in the toy distribution sector [ archive ]. The Competition Council sanctions for 37 million 5 toy manufacturers and 3 distributors. Chicco - Baby de France, France Goliath, France Hasbro, Lego SAS MegaBrands Europe NV and Carrefour France, Maxi Toys France and EPSE-JouéClub.
- March 22, 2006: Case of software Drapo [ archive ]. The Competition Council condemns 34 construction companies for widespread agreement on procurement of Ile-de-France and sanctions to the tune of 48.5 million euros.
- 15 December 2005. The Competition Council sanctioned 6 construction companies [ archive ]. specialized in the supply of asphalt for a total amount of 33.6 million euros.
- 1 ^{st} December 2005: Agreement on the mobile phone market [ archive ]. The Competition Council sanctions to the tune of 534 million euros the companies Orange France, SFR and Bouygues Telecom 60.
- May 13, 2005: Highway A 84 called "Route Estuaries" [ archive ]. The Competition Council condemns 21 construction companies for sanctions and agreement for 17 million euros.
- 1 ^{st} April 2003: Distribution of fuels on motorways: the Competition Council sanctioned the main oil groups [ archive ]. The Competition Council sanctions leading oil groups. They imposed fines totaling 27 million euros.
- September 23, 2002: price agreement in the ball bearings sector [ archive ]. The Competition Council sanctions the leading manufacturers for a total of about 19 million.
- July 3, 2002: appliances and audiovisual devices: the Competition Council sanctions an agreement between major retailers and some manufacturers [ archive ]. The Competition Council sanctioned the manufacturer of household appliances Thomson and distributors Fnac, Darty, Euromarket, Connection, Camif and Conforama for a total of about 34 million.

== See also ==
- Competition and Markets Authority (United Kingdom)
- Bundeskartellamt (Germany)
