= Lorenzo Bini Smaghi =

Italian economist

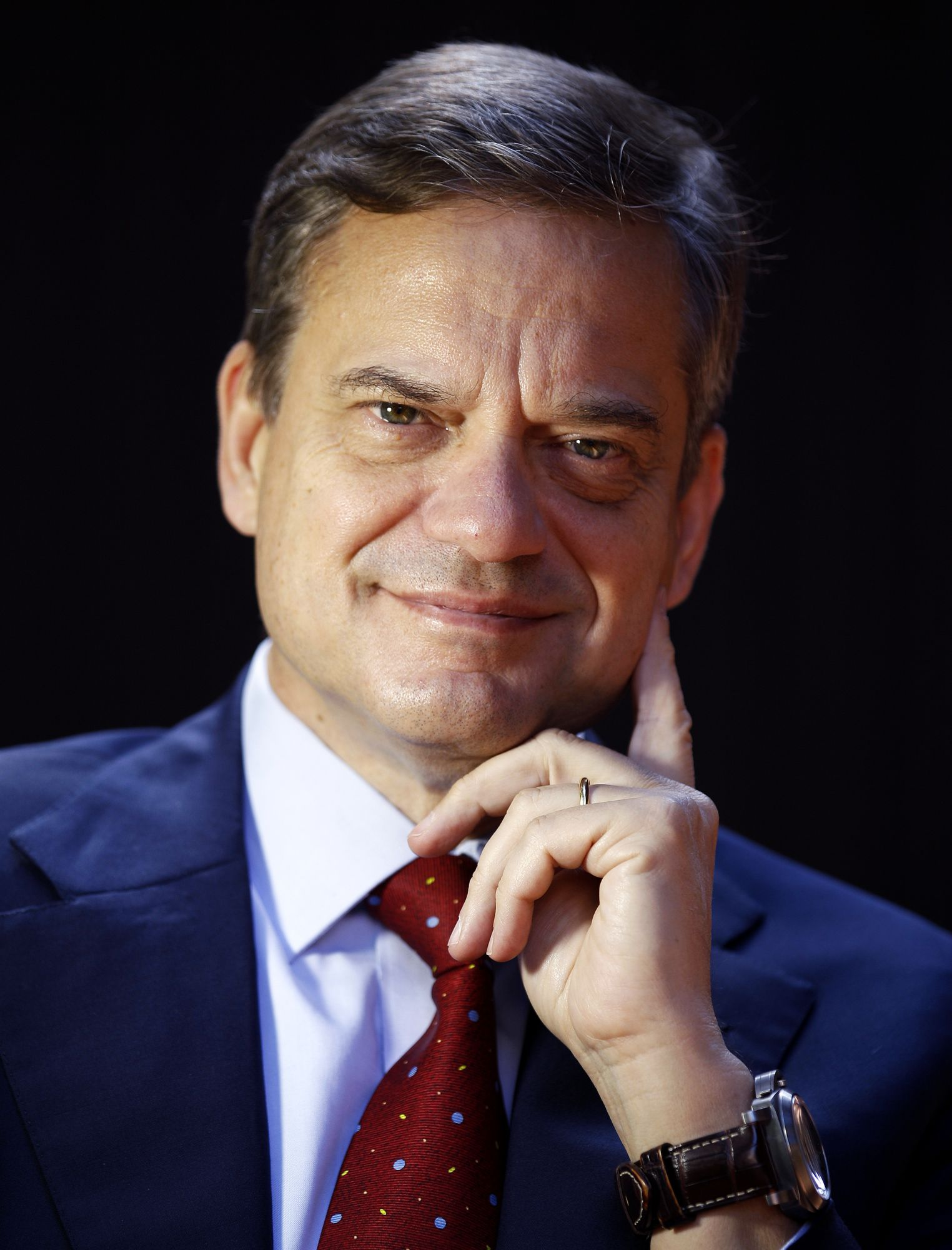

Member of the Executive Board of the European Central Bank
- In office 1 June 2005 – 31 December 2011
- Preceded by: Tommaso Padoa-Schioppa
- Succeeded by: Benoît Cœuré

Personal details
- Born: 29 November 1956 (age 69) Florence, Italy
- Education: UCLouvain; University of Southern California; University of Chicago

Lorenzo Bini Smaghi (born 29 November 1956) is an Italian economist and banker who was a member of the Executive Board of the European Central Bank from 2005 to 2011. He has been chairman of Société Générale since 2015.

== Early life and education ==
Born in Florence in an ancient noble family, Bini Smaghi grew up in Brussels, acquiring a knowledge of foreign languages at an early age. In 1974 he graduated from the Lycée Français de Bruxelles. In 1978 he graduated in Economics from the Université catholique de Louvain (Belgium). With a scholarship from the U.S.-Italy Fulbright Commission, in 1980 he received a master's degree in Economics from the University of Southern California; and a PhD from the University of Chicago in 1988.

== Career ==
=== Public sector ===
Before joining the ECB, Bini Smaghi was Director General for International Financial Relations of the Italian Ministry of Economy and Finance. In this capacity, he also was vice-president of the Economic and Financial Committee (EFC) of the European Union from 2003 until 2005. His earlier appointments include: Deputy Director-General Research of the ECB, Head of the Policy Division of the European Monetary Institute in Frankfurt and Head of the Exchange Rate and International Trade Division of the Research Department of the Bank of Italy in Rome. He has published extensively in monetary and international economics.

Bini Smaghi was a member of the Executive Board of the European Central Bank under the leadership of Jean-Claude Trichet from June 2005 to November 2011; he was appointed for an eight-year, non-renewable mandate. He took over from Tommaso Padoa-Schioppa.

On the ECB Executive Board, Bini Smaghi was responsible for international and European relations and for the legal department of the Bank and for its administration, including the building of a new seat for the ECB in the Frankfurt Grossmarkthalle. During his time in office, he also gained a reputation for occasionally openly criticised the German government over the handling of the European debt crisis.

Bini Smaghi resigned from the ECB in November 2011. At the time, he had been under pressure from the French and Italian governments to step down for several months, after Mario Draghi, another Italian, become president of the ECB. At the same time, he was lobbied by his colleagues on the executive board not to be seen as being under the control of politicians.

=== Private sector ===
In 2012, Bini Smaghi became a visiting scholar at Harvard's Weatherhead Center for International Affairs and Senior Research Fellow at Istituto Affari Internazionali in Rome.

Bini Smaghi joined French bank Société Générale as a second vice-chairman and independent director in 2014. Since January 2015, he has been chairman. Société Générale had previously split the roles of chairman and chief executive as required by European law, appointing Bini Smaghi to chair the board of directors while Frédéric Oudéa continued as chief executive.

== Other activities ==
=== Corporate boards ===
- Tages Holding, Member of the Board of Directors (since 2014)
- Italgas, Non-Executive Member and Chair of the Board of Directors (2016-2019)
- ChiantiBanca, Chairman of the Board (2016-2017)
- Morgan Stanley International, Independent Member of the Board of Directors (2013-2014)
- Snam, Chair of the Board of Directors (2012-2016)

=== Non-profit organizations ===
- Bretton Woods Committee, Member of the Board of Directors (since 2020)
- Scope Foundation, Member of the Board of Trustees (since 2020)
- European Financial Services Roundtable (EFR), Member
- Fondazione Palazzo Strozzi, President
- Leibniz Institute for Financial Research (SAFE), Member of the Policy Advisory Council
- Italy-USA Foundation, Member

== Personal life ==
Bini Smaghi is married to economist Veronica De Romanis and has two children.

== Publications ==
Author of several articles and books on international and European monetary and financial issues.

- La tentazione di andarsene. Fuori dall’Europa c’è un futuro per l’Italia?, Il Mulino Ed., Bologna, 2017.
- 33 false verità sull’Europa, Il Mulino Ed., Bologna, 2014.
- Austerity, European Democracies against the wall, CEPS, Brussels, 2013.
- Morire di Austerità, Democrazie europee con le spalle al muro, Il Mulino Bologna, 2013.
- Il paradosso dell'euro. Luci e ombre dieci anni dopo, Rizzoli, Milano 2008.
- L’Euro, Il Mulino, Bologna, 1998 (Third Edition: 2001).
- Open Issues in European Central Banking, Macmillan, London, 2000 (with Daniel Gros)
- Chi ci salva dalla prossima crisi finanziaria?, Il Mulino, Bologna, 2000.

== Notes ==
Government offices
Preceded by Tommaso Padoa-Schioppa	Member of the Executive Board of the European Central Bank; 2005–2011	Succeeded by Benoît Cœuré
