= Fiorella Kostoris =

Italian economist (born 1945)

Fiorella Kostoris Padoa-Schioppa (born 5 May 1945) is an Italian economist who is professor at the University of Rome (La Sapienza). She is also a professor at the College of Europe in Bruges. She has published approximately a hundred articles and twenty books in various languages on topics concerning macroeconomics, labor, public finance, unemployment, pension reform and other topics. She was president of ISAE, the Italian independent but government-funded economic think tank until March 2003. She is working on a book on European economic policies and institutions.

Fiorella Kostoris was married to the late Italian economist and politician Tommaso Padoa-Schioppa.

== Personal background ==
She was born in 1945 in Rome but raised in Trieste in a Jewish family that placed a high value on education and on knowledge of foreign languages. In an interview she described how she was one of only 5 pupils in her class each of whom competed every day to be ranked first by the teacher. She has described herself as very left wing in her youth, even attending Italian Communist Party meetings (although the communists made fun of her for arriving in an Alfa Romeo Giulia sports car). After graduating from Milan's Bocconi University in Economics she went to the United States where she earned a graduate degree at the Massachusetts Institute of Technology in 1968. Of her experience in the US she said "I came back more of a [classical] liberal, more convinced that overall welfare is maximized by people seeking their own individual well being". At MIT she met Franco Modigliani and later became an editor of his collected papers.

Her best known book is Italy: The Sheltered Economy (1993) in which she made the case that Italy has a huge and interventionist governmental economic policy compared to other countries and that much of this state action and regulation is irrational and counter-efficient.

== Her controversial policy recommendation ==
On 19 March 2004 Kostoris published an article in the newspaper Il Sole 24 Ore entitled Abolire una settimana di ferie per rilanciare l'economia. Kostoris adduced statistics showing that the average Italian worker works fewer hours throughout his career than his European and North American counterparts. Furthermore, the number of hours worked per year is gradually decreasing. If this trend could be reversed Italian economic growth would pick up. The causes of the low hours of work per person are many; they include early retirement, delays in finding a job, strikes for non-contract related reasons, as well as more holidays than other countries. To illustrate the tradeoff between work and leisure Kostoris calculated that if every Italian gave up one week of time off the GNP would increase by 0.3% to 0.4%. The idea was initially endorsed by Italian prime minister Silvio Berlusconi; in a speech in Cernobbio on 29 March he said "There are too many holidays. A few days of extra work will produce a beneficial effect on GNP". But the public reaction was quite negative and the idea was quietly dropped.

While Kostoris was pilloried as a slave driver who wants to force people to work, the substantive issues raised in her article were not seriously addressed.
