= Benoît Cœuré =

French economist (born 1969)

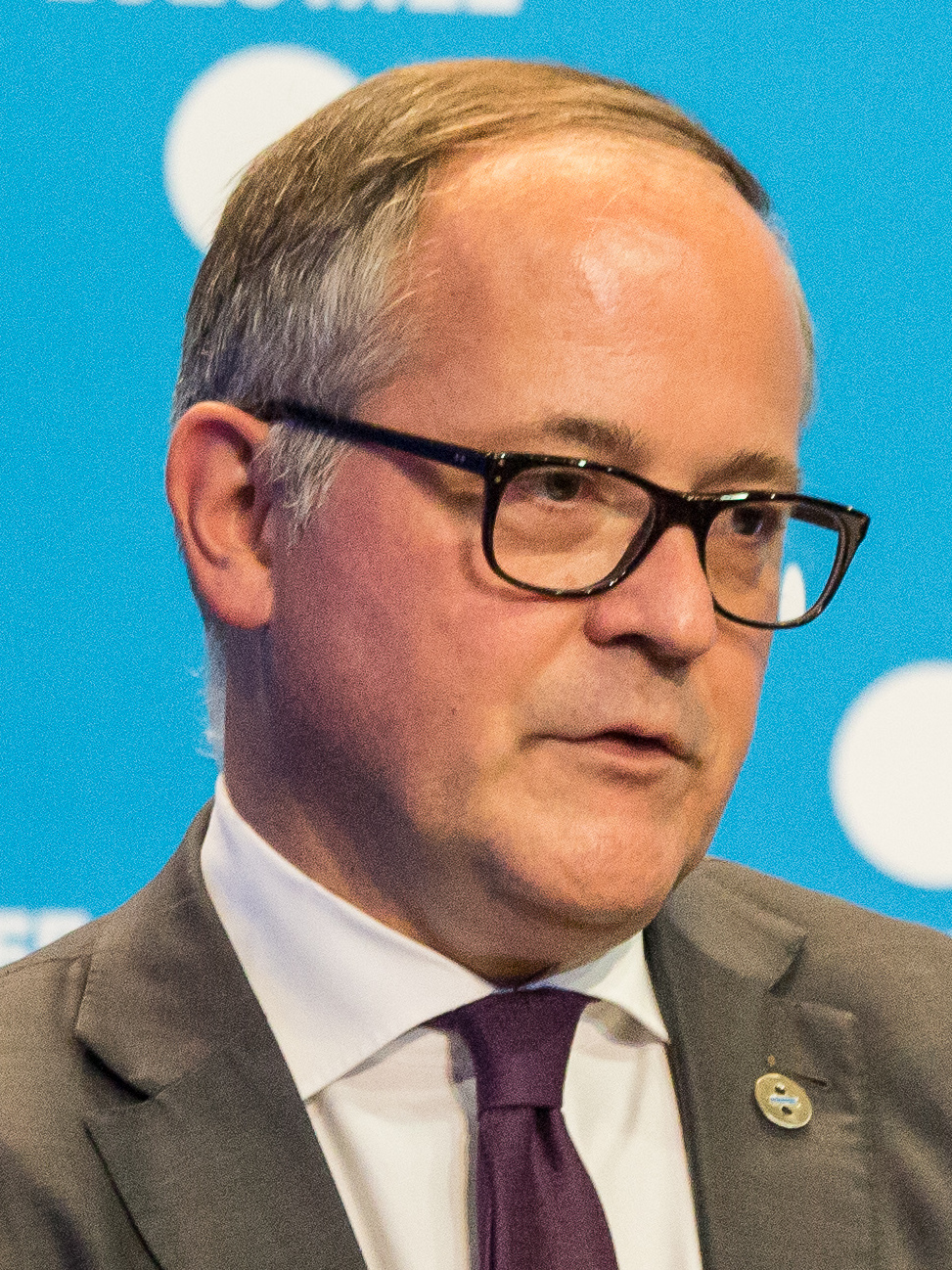

President of the Autorité de la concurrence
- Incumbent
- Assumed office 20 January 2022
- Preceded by: Isabelle de Silva

Member of the Executive Board of the European Central Bank
- In office 1 January 2012 – 31 December 2019
- Preceded by: Lorenzo Bini Smaghi
- Succeeded by: Fabio Panetta

Personal details
- Born: Benoît Georges Cœuré; 17 March 1969 (age 57) Grenoble, France
- Education: École polytechnique

Benoît Georges Cœuré (French: [bənwa kœʁe]; born 17 March 1969) is a French economist who has presided over the Autorité de la concurrence since 2022. He previously served as a member of the Executive Board of the European Central Bank (ECB) from 2012 to 2019.

== Education ==
Benoît Cœuré graduated from the École polytechnique (X 1987) and the National School of Statistics and Economic Administration (ENSAE). He also holds a Master of Advanced Studies (DEA) in economic analysis and policy from the School for Advanced Studies in the Social Sciences (EHESS) and a BA in Japanese from University Paris 7.

== Early career ==
Cœuré taught economics at the École polytechnique and was chief economist, no. 2 official, head of multilateral affairs and development, and head of France's debt-management office in the country's finance ministry.

From 2007 to 2009, Cœuré was also co-chair of the Paris Club of official creditors. In addition, he co-chaired the G20 Working Group on Reforming the World Bank and the Other Multilateral Development Banks (2009) and of the G20 Sub-Working Group on Global Liquidity Management (2011).

== European Central Bank (2012–2019) ==
In late November 2011, Cœuré was nominated to the ECB executive board to replace Italy's Lorenzo Bini Smaghi. He was, in a respect, a replacement for former ECB President Jean-Claude Trichet on the six-member board. France had reportedly insisted, as a condition for approving Italian Mario Draghi as Trichet's replacement earlier in the year, on Bini Smaghi's early resignation so a new French member could be appointed. In confirmation hearings in December, in line with a position already stated by Draghi, Cœuré said the bank maybe would have to increase its purchases of member-country sovereign debt as part of the effort to combat the European sovereign debt crisis. He stated, however, that any increase in bond buying would have to obey the ECB's primary goal of ensuring price stability. He was confirmed in mid-December and began his 8-year term on 1 January 2012.

Cœuré was named to manage ECB market operations as of March 2012, succeeding José Manuel González Paramo, as well as payment systems and market infrastructures, and for a brief period of time, IT and economic research. He was in charge of international relations and European affairs from 2014, when his German colleague Jörg Asmussen left the ECB, until 2019. In this capacity, he was a member of the EU Economic and Financial Committee and Euro Working Group and took part in negotiations on financial support to Ireland, Portugal, Cyprus and Greece.

Cœuré is a supporter of the monetary policy of the ECB, which includes the use of unconventional measures. He repeatedly noted that the economic situation since the outbreak of the crisis warrants low ECB interest rates. He warned, however, that the monetary policy response of the ECB to the crises carries risks. It shields, he says, governments and other market participants from the disciplinary force of the markets and could make it easier for them to postpone painful reform.

He urged governments not to be complacent, because the rates will not stay that low forever. "With our decisions we gave them time. It is important that they use this time and prepare themselves and become more resilient". Already in 2005 he had called for structural reforms and a more sustainable fiscal policy in Europe. He argued repeatedly that for the euro area to be resilient, it would need three lines of defence: flexible and integrated markets, sound national fiscal policies, and a common fiscal capacity.

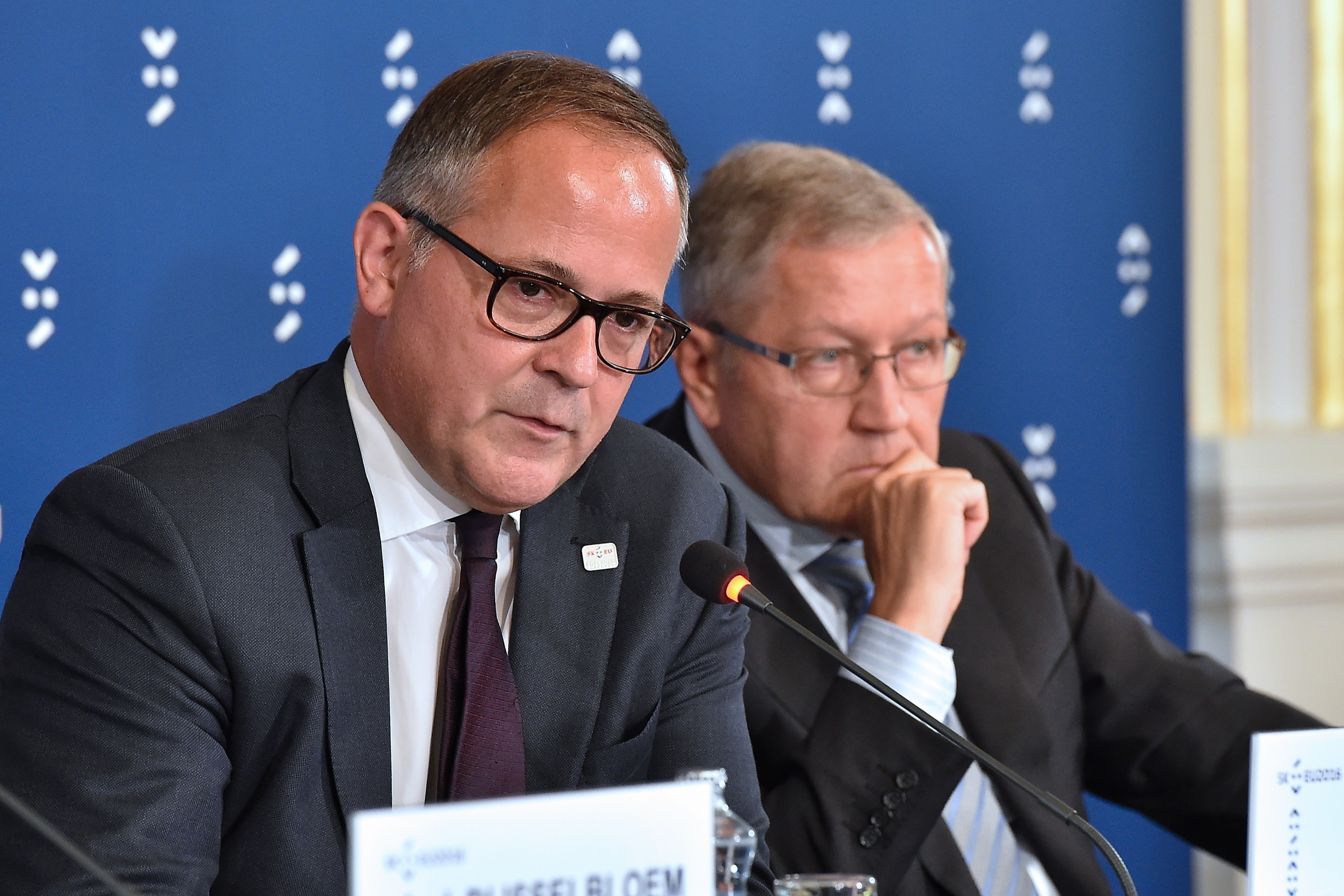
Coeuré (left) with Klaus Regling

Cœuré argued that central banks actions can generate moral hazard in the banking system and risk. He warned that "support that is considered as appropriate during the crisis might have perverse effects on the incentives of banks at a later stage." He also argued in favour of the ECB being tasked with banking supervision, but with a strict separation between the monetary policy and bank supervision functions of the ECB

He supported the controversial decision on OMTs (Outright Monetary Transactions), but was in strong favor of the introduced conditionalities to mitigate negative side effects. He argued that "under OMTs, governments will have to continue their reform efforts as required by the respective ESM programme and by IMF involvement. Otherwise, they would simply become ineligible for OMTs. Hence, no reforms, no OMTs." Therefore, he was perceived in the market to be more on the hawkish side of the Governing Council of the ECB.

Together with his German ECB colleague Jörg Asmussen, Cœuré supported the publication of the minutes of monthly ECB meetings. In a speech delivered in November 2018, he also pioneered the discussion on the role of monetary for climate change and he openly criticized the use of output gap calculation in EU macroeconomic policy.

In his farewell speech from the ECB, in December 2019, he argued against overreliance in capital markets to transmit monetary policy, and concluded that "If monetary policy remains a conversation between central banks and financial markets, we shouldn't be surprised if people don't trust us."

In October 2013 Cœuré was appointed chair of the Bank for International Settlements' Committee on Payment and Settlement Systems, a standard setting body for payment, clearing and securities settlement systems, which he headed for six years. In 2014, the Committee became the Committee on Payments and Market Infrastructures (CPMI). Under his direction, the Committee tackled different topics, such as the resilience and recovery of central counterparties, cyber resilience for financial market infrastructures, and the emergence of crypto assets and tech giants in financial services. The CPMI published the first international report on central bank digital currencies in 2018.

In 2019, Cœuré chaired a Group of Seven working group on global stablecoins. In early 2019, a Reuters poll of economists found that Cœuré was considered best-suited for the role as President of the European Central Bank, but Christine Lagarde was eventually nominated for the position.

== Career post-ECB ==
=== Bank for International Settlements ===
In November 2019, Cœuré was appointed by the board of directors of the Bank for International Settlements (BIS) as Head of the new BIS Innovation Hub, established to foster international collaboration among central banks on innovative financial technology. In 2020–21, the BIS Innovation Hub was deployed in Hong Kong, Singapore, Switzerland, London and Stockholm in partnership with local central banks, and built a portfolio of proofs of concept and prototypes across five strategic themes: central bank digital currency, next generation financial market infrastructures, open finance, regtech and suptech, cybersecurity, and green finance. Between 2020 and 2021, Cœuré co-chaired with Bank of England Deputy Governor Sir Jon Cunliffe a working group on central bank digital currency (CBDC) set up by seven central banks and the BIS, which published in September 2021 reports on user needs and adoption, system design and interoperability and financial stability implications. He warned against regulation of digital assets and decentralised finance being developed along different tracks and urged discussions on a global regulatory framework.

=== Autorité de la concurrence ===
In 2021, the French government proposed Cœuré to succeed Isabelle de Silva as the new head of the Autorité de la concurrence, the French antitrust agency. On 13 January 2022, after being heard by the Senate and the National Assembly, his appointment was confirmed. He took office on 22 January 2022 for a five-year term.

== Controversy ==
In May 2015, in an evening non-public speech with simultaneous release added but then delayed due to "an internal procedural error" at ECB, Cœuré apparently moved markets the next day in the euro currency and European stocks and bonds with the announcement that the bank's bond-buying programme would be "moderately front-load[ed]" before the summer trading lull. The speech was originally scheduled to take place under the so-called Chatham House Rule.

In the days after the Cœuré speech the ECB "declined to comment about its use of Chatham House rules" for the 18 May speech or about its other recent invocations of the rule. In a letter to the European Ombudsman, Emily O'Reilly, ECB's President, Mario Draghi, clarified the circumstances of the incident and noted that it resulted from internal miscommunication at an operational level on the timing of the speech's publication, which took place out-of-office hours. The Ombudsman welcomed the transparency steps taken by ECB to prevent any other similar incident.

== Other activities ==
=== Government agencies ===
- Committee for the evaluation of the French recovery plan "France Relance", Chair (2021–2022)
- Committee on the Monitoring and Evaluation of Financial Support Measures for Companies Confronted with the COVID-19 Epidemic, Chair (April 2020)
- French Development Agency (AFD), Member of the Board of Directors (2007–2009)
- Caisse d'Amortissement De La Dette Sociale (CADES), Member of the Board of Directors (2002–2007)

=== Non-profit organisations ===
- World Economic Forum (WEF), Member of the Europe Policy Group (2017) and of the Digital Currency Governance Consortium Steering Committee (2020–2021)
- Cercle des économistes, Member

=== University and research centres ===
- Jacques Delors Centre at Hertie School, Member of the Advisory Board
- Center for Economic Research and its Applications (CEPREMAP), President (since 2012)
- Cercle des Economistes, Member (on extended leave)
- Paris School of Economics, Member of the Board (2016–2022)
- International Center for Monetary and Banking Studies, Chair of the Scientific Committee

== Speeches ==
- "Central banks and the challenges of the zero lower bound", at meeting hosted by the Initiative on Global Markets (University of Chicago Booth School of Business), Miami, 19 February 2012; at ECB website. Via Ralph Atkins, "Cœuré, the ECB and zero interest rates", ft.com blog, 24 February 2012.
- "The monetary policy of the European Central Bank", at Barclays’ European Conference, Tokyo, 26 March 2012. Via Bank for International Settlements web site.
- "Why the euro needs a banking union", Frankfurt am Main, 8 October 2012.
- "Reviving credit growth in the euro area", at the Paris Europlace International Financial Forum “Growth and Investment Opportunities in Europe” in Paris, France; 11 July 2013
- (9 September 2014): Learning about negative interest rates
- (14 November 2014): The global and European aspects of policy coordination
- (2 February 2015): Lamfalussy was right: independence and interdependence in a monetary union (remark: Alexandre Lamfalussy (born 1929))
- (18 May 2015): How binding is the zero lower bound?; delivered at the conference “Removing the zero lower bound on interest rates”, organised by Imperial College Business School / Brevan Howard Centre for Financial Analysis, CEPR and the Swiss National Bank.

== Honours ==
- Knight of the Legion of Honour (2015)
- Officer of the Ordre national du Mérite (2020)

Government offices
| Preceded by Lorenzo Bini Smaghi | Member of the Executive Board of the European Central Bank; 2012–2019 | Succeeded by Fabio Panetta |
