= Tommaso Padoa-Schioppa =

Italian banker and economist (1940–2010)

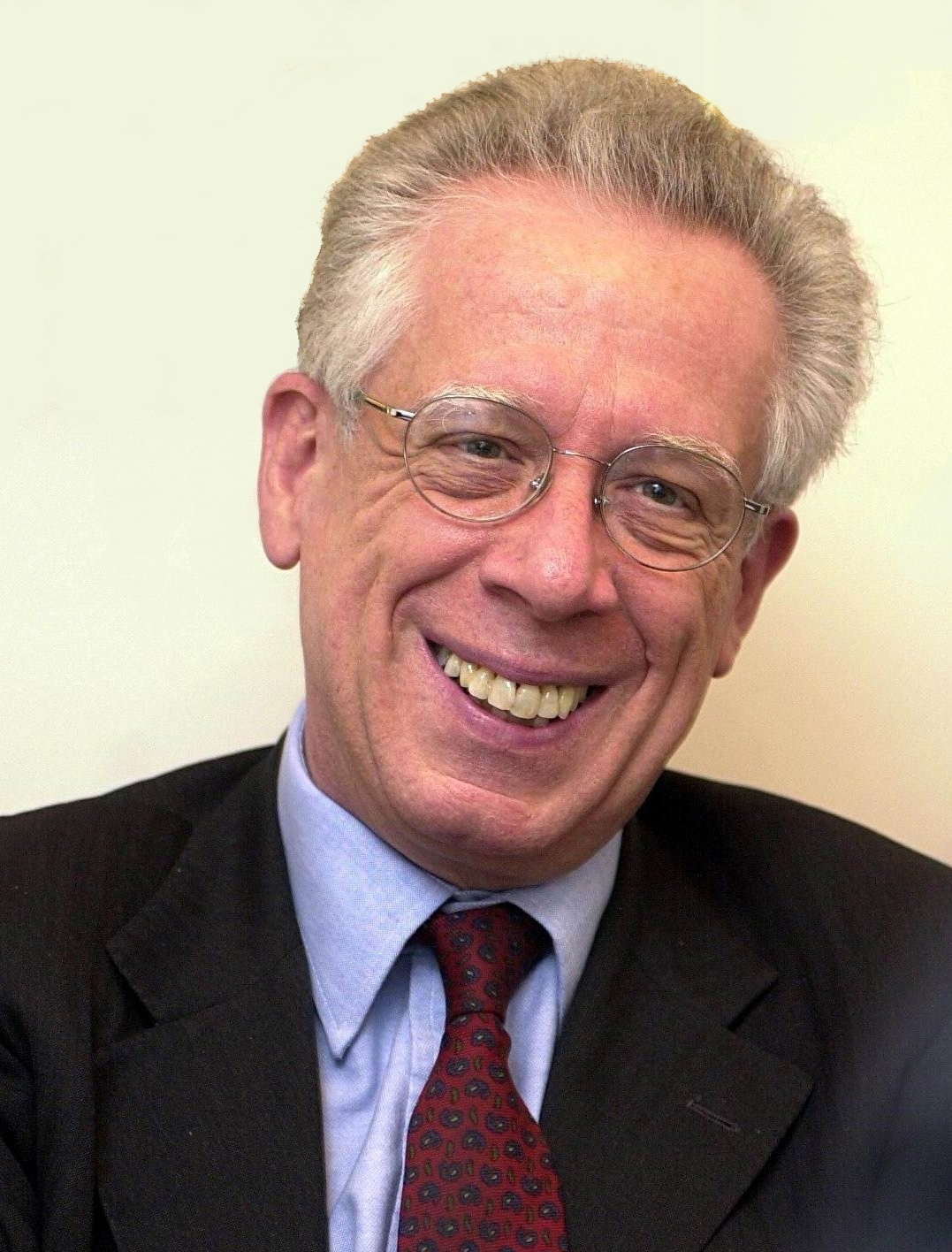
- Padoa-Schioppa in 2008

Minister of Economy and Finance
- In office 17 May 2006 – 8 May 2008
- Prime Minister: Romano Prodi
- Preceded by: Giulio Tremonti
- Succeeded by: Giulio Tremonti

Member of the Executive Board of the European Central Bank
- In office 1 June 1998 – 31 May 2005
- Preceded by: Position established
- Succeeded by: Lorenzo Bini Smaghi

Personal details
- Born: 23 July 1940 Belluno, Veneto, Kingdom of Italy
- Died: 18 December 2010 (aged 70) Rome, Lazio, Italy
- Party: Independent
- Spouse: Fiorella Kostoris (divorced)
- Domestic partner: Barbara Spinelli
- Children: 3
- Education: Bocconi University; Massachusetts Institute of Technology

Tommaso Padoa-Schioppa, OMRI (Italian pronunciation: [tomˈmaːzo ˈpaːdoa ˈskjɔppa]; 23 July 1940 – 18 December 2010) was an Italian banker and economist who served as Italy's Minister of Economy and Finance from 2006 to 2008. He previously served as a member of the Executive Board of the European Central Bank from 1998 to 2005. Padoa-Schioppa is considered as a founding father of the European single currency. He was a former member of the Steering Committee of the Bilderberg Group.

== Biography ==
He was born in the mountain town of Belluno in north-eastern Italy. Both his parents were intellectuals. His father, Fabio (1911–2012), whom he did not meet until after the war in 1945, was a teacher and later became a senior executive at the insurance company Assicurazioni Generali.

He graduated from Bocconi University (Milan) in 1966 and received a master's degree from the Massachusetts Institute of Technology in 1970. After his first job in Germany with the retailer C&A Brenninkmeijer, he joined the Bank of Italy in 1968, eventually becoming Vice-Director General from 1984 to 1997. In 1980 he became a member of the influential Washington-based financial advisory body, the Group of Thirty and remained one till his death. From 1993–97, he was president of the Basel Committee on Banking Supervision, and from 2000-05 Chairman of the Committee on Payment and Settlement Systems. In 1997–98 he was head of Consob, Italy's stock market supervision agency. He was a member of the European Central Bank's six-member executive board from its foundation in 1998 until the end of May 2005. In October 2005 he became president of Paris-based think tank Notre Europe.

On 17 May 2006, he was appointed as Economy and Finance Minister in the government of Romano Prodi, serving in that post until May 2008, when a new government headed by Silvio Berlusconi took office following the April 2008 general election. From October 2007 to April 2008, he was Chairman of the IMFC (International Monetary and Financial Committee), the top policy steering committee of the International Monetary Fund (IMF). In June 2009 he was appointed as chairman for Europe of the private finance consulting Promontory Financial Group.

== Personal life ==
He was married to the economist Fiorella Kostoris; they have three children. After their divorce, he became the companion of Barbara Spinelli, a journalist, daughter of Altiero Spinelli and Ursula Hirschmann.

== Death ==
Padoa-Schioppa died on 18 December 2010, aged 70, after suffering a heart attack during a dinner he had organized in Rome.

== Terms coined or popularized by Padoa-Schioppa ==
In 2006, Padoa-Schioppa coined the expression "il tesoretto" (the little treasure) to describe the increased government revenues under his administration. The term was widely used by politicians as they debated how this new money should be spent. In October 2007 he spoke to a parliamentary committee about the government's plan for tax relief (approx. €500/year) to people 20–30 years old still living with their family, saying it would help them move out on their own. He used the ironic or sarcastic term "bamboccioni" (big dummy boys, or big stuffed children) and this created a big fuss in Italian public opinion.

Newspapers received numerous letters from readers personally taking offence and pointing out that he understood little about the situation of a considerable part of the 20–30 years old Italian population, who live on approximately €1,000 per month and cannot afford to leave their parents' house. According to some lexicographers, "bamboccioni" was the most popular new Italian word of 2007. He was the first to describe the euro as "a currency without a State" (in a book published in 2004), a term that was later popularized by Otmar Issing.

== Role in the creation of the Euro ==
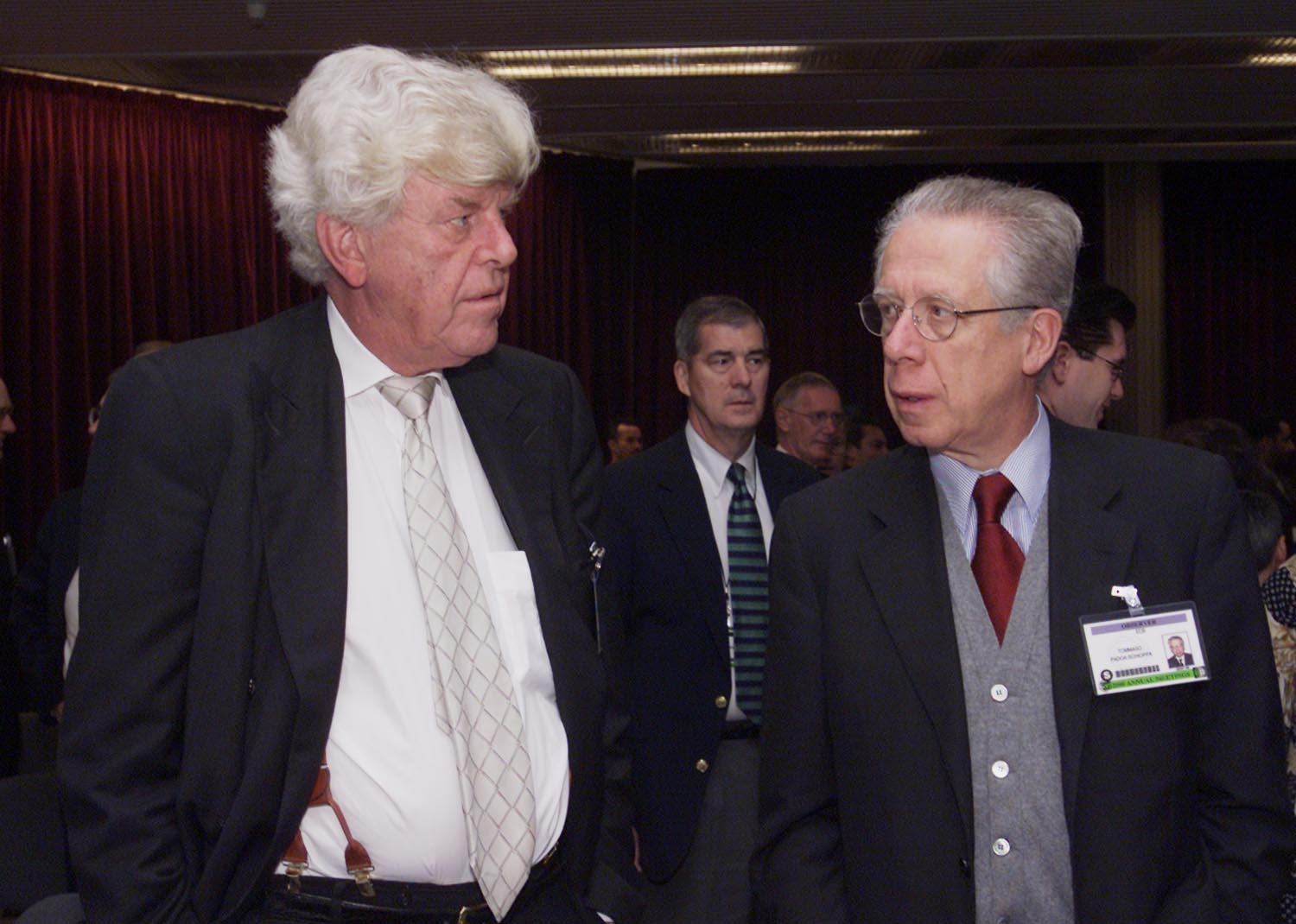
Padoa-Schioppa and Wim Duisenberg during an International Monetary Fund meeting in Washington, D.C. on 24 September 2000.

Padoa-Schioppa has been called the "intellectual impetus" behind the Euro and the "founding father" of the new currency. In an economics paper written in 1982 he pointed out that it is impossible for a group of countries like the EU to simultaneously aim at:

- free trade,
- capital mobility,
- independent domestic monetary policies, and
- fixed exchange rates.

These four goals, each apparently desirable on its own, he called "the inconsistent quartet" (see also the similar Impossible trinity concept).

At that time, European Union countries maintained some restrictions on trade and (especially) on capital movements. These were gradually eliminated through the Single Market programme and the liberalization of capital movements so that by the late 1980s one of the two remaining objectives had to go to for consistency to be maintained. He proposed that the third objective (independent monetary policies) be abandoned, by creating a single currency and a single European central bank, so that the other three objectives could be attained. The Delors Report of April 1989 endorsed this view and recommended a European Monetary Union (EMU) with a single currency. He worked on designing and setting up the new European Central Bank and became one of the first executive board members (June 1998-May 2005).

== Books ==
- Padoa-Schioppa, Tommaso (2004). The Euro and Its Central Bank. The MIT Press. ISBN 0-262-16222-9.
- Padoa-Schioppa, Tommaso (2004). Regulating Finance: Balancing Freedom and Risk. Oxford University Press. ISBN 978-0-19-927056-9.
- Padoa-Schioppa, Tommaso (2006). Europa una pazienza attiva. Rizzoli. ISBN 88-17-01068-5. (Italian language)

== See also ==
- Delors Committee

Government offices
Preceded by Cannelo Oteri	Deputy Director General of the Bank of Italy; 1984–1997	Succeeded by Antonio Finocchiaro
New office	Member of the Executive Board of the European Central Bank; 1998–2005	Succeeded by Lorenzo Bini Smaghi
Political offices
Preceded by Giulio Tremonti	Italian Minister of Economy and Finance; 2006–2008	Succeeded by Giulio Tremonti
