= Maurizio Prato =

Italian businessman (born 1941)

Maurizio Prato (born 18 May 1941, in Foligno) is an Italian businessman. He is currently president of Fintecna.

He was chief executive of the Italian airline Alitalia. From 2003 to 2007 he was president and CEO and since 2007 only president of Fintecna. He was president of Grandi Stazioni and president of Alitalia. He resigned after the merger deal with Air France, KLM collapsed in April 2008. From 2011 to 2014, he was the President of the Istituto Poligrafico e Zecca dello Stato.
