= Augusto Fantozzi =

Italian politician (1940–2019)

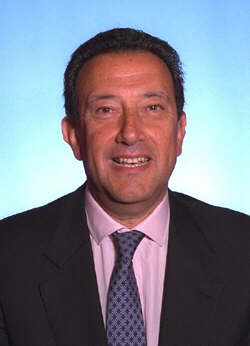

Minister of Economy and Finance
- In office 17 January 1995 – 18 May 1996
- Prime Minister: Lamberto Dini
- Preceded by: Giulio Tremonti
- Succeeded by: Vincenzo Visco

Minister of Foreign Trade
- In office May 1996 – October 1998
- Prime Minister: Romano Prodi
- Succeeded by: Piero Fassino

Personal details
- Born: 24 June 1940 Rome
- Died: 13 July 2019 (aged 79) Rome
- Party: Olive Tree Alliance
- Education: La Sapienza University

Augusto Fantozzi (24 June 1940 – 13 July 2019) was an Italian lawyer, tax expert, academic, businessman and politician who served as economy and finance minister and then, foreign trade minister.

== Early life and education ==
Fantozzi was born in Rome on 24 July 1940. He received a law degree from La Sapienza University in 1962.

== Career ==
Fantozzi worked at La Sapienza University as full professor of tax law from 1974 to 1990. He founded a law firm, Fantozzi & Associati, in 1975. He was the tax advisor to the Benetton financial group. In 1990, he was appointed full professor of tax law at LUISS in Rome.

He served as minister of finance from 17 January 1995 to 18 May 1996 in the cabinet led by then prime minister Lamberto Dini. In I996, he became a deputy for the Olive Tree Alliance. In May 1996, Fantozzi was appointed foreign trade minister to the coalition government led by Romano Prodi. He served in office until October 1998.

After leaving office, Fantozzi began to serve as the chairman of the budget, treasury and economic planning committee. In May 2005, he was appointed to Enel's board of directors. In June 2005, he was also named as the chairman of Banca Antonveneta, and resigned from office in late 2006. In addition, he was one of the board directors of the Benetton Group and serves as a member of the Consulta, which is an advisory body for the Vatican concerning the efficient running of the state.

In August 2008, Fantozzi was named by the Italian government as Alitalia's extraordinary administrator or commissioner, and he oversaw the firm's bankruptcy process.
