= Franco Gallo =

Italian politician

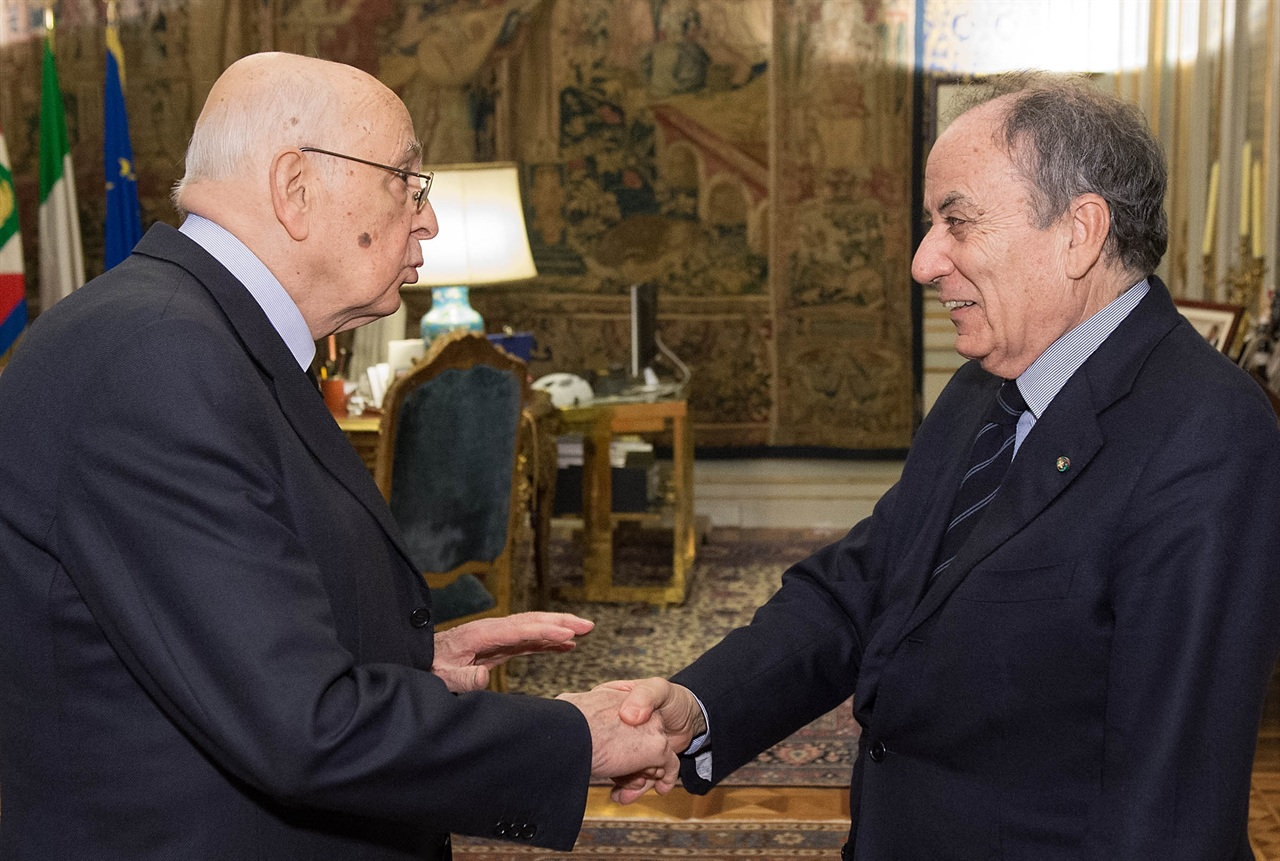
Franco Gallo with Giorgio Napolitano

Franco Gallo (born 23 April 1937) is an Italian constitutionalist, former Minister of Finance and former President of the Italian Constitutional Court. He is a member of the Italy–USA Foundation and of the Accademia dei Lincei.

== Biography ==
Gallo was born in Rome to parents originally from Floridia (Sicily). After graduating in law at the Sapienza University of Rome he was a lecturer in Tax Law at the Faculty of Law of the LUISS University and the University of Rome Tor Vergata and has also taught in the Faculty of Political Sciences of the University of Naples Federico II.

He served as Minister of Finance in the Ciampi Cabinet from 1993 to 1994. He was one of the four "technical" (non-party) ministers of that government. The initiative for which his post as minister is remembered, mainly, was the strong simplification of the tax return forms. During his ministry, "sector studies" were also introduced for the first time, i.e. those tools with which the taxman "estimates" the incomes of freelancers and self-employed workers.

He was appointed constitutional judge by the President of the Republic Carlo Azeglio Ciampi on 14 September 2004 and was sworn in on 16 September 2004. On 6 December 2011 he was appointed vice president of the Constitutional Court by President Alfonso Quaranta.

On 29 January 2013 he was elected President of the Constitutional Court of the Italian Republic, taking over from Alfonso Quaranta, remaining in office until 16 September 2013.

On 16 February 2014 he was appointed president of the Institute of the Italian Encyclopedia.
