= Alberto Alemanno =

Italian academic and lawyer

- Alemanno in 2026
- Born: 1975 (age 50–51); Turin, Italy
- Education: Harvard Law School, College of Europe, Bocconi University
- Occupations: academic, author, lawyer

Alberto Alemanno (born 30 April 1975 in Turin, Italy) is an Italian academic, author, public interest lawyer, and civic entrepreneur. He is Jean Monnet Professor in European Union Law at HEC Paris since 2009, permanent visiting professor at the University of Tokyo, School of Public Policy, and at the College of Europe in Bruges. He is also a non-resident Democracy Fellow at Harvard University's Ash Center for Democratic Governance and Innovation.

== Academic career ==
Alemanno holds LL.M. degrees from Harvard Law School and the College of Europe. He began his academic career at the College of Europe in Bruges in 2001, when he was selected as a teaching assistant before embarking in the following year on his Ph.D. in International Law & Economics at Bocconi University.

After working as a lawyer in Paris, he became a qualified attorney in New York in 2004 and then served as a law clerk for Judge Allan Rosas and Judge Alexander Arabadjiev at the Court of Justice of the European Union and for Enzo Moavero Milanesi at the General Court of the European Union.

He started teaching in 2009 as associate professor of law at HEC Paris; since 2011 he is Jean Monnet Professor of EU Law at HEC Paris where he teaches European Union Law, EU Affairs and Advocacy, as well as Global Risk Regulation.

In 2013 he became Global Clinical Professor of Law at New York University School of Law where he established and serves as faculty director the HEC-NYU EU Public Interest Clinic, a program to train new public interest lawyers and civic advocates. He is permanent visiting professor at the University of Tokyo, School of Public Policy and at the College of Europe.

Alemanno has also been guest professor at St. Gallen University, where he led the Public Affairs, Advocacy and Law module at the MBL Executive Programme for over a decade.

== Advocacy ==
Alemanno regularly provides advice to a variety of NGOs as well as governments and international organizations on various aspects of European Union law, international regulatory co-operation, international trade and global health law. He sits on the board of several civil society organisations, such as European Alternatives, Access Info Europe, Riparte il Futuro, Diritto di Sapere, as well as the citizens’ pan-EU campaigning movements We Move and Vox-Europe.

Alberto Alemanno was involved in the registration of the first European Citizen Initiative aimed at eliminating the international roaming charges in 2013 (One Single Tariff) and provided advice to several others.

Alemanno campaigned for plain tobacco packaging by training public officials and health advocates and providing legal assistance to the World Health Organization.

In 2015, Alemanno and others published a report for Wikimedia on freedom of panorama in Europe. The same year, he has been advocating for the prohibition of airline "no-show" clauses by serving BEUC, European Consumer Organisation.

In 2016, he prepared a report for WWF advocating reform of the Common Agricultural Policy.

In 2018 he was one of the initiators of the campaign Real Representation as Europeans for the 2019 European Parliament election with the We Move slogan.

In 2018, he successfully lodged one of the complaints to the European Ombudsman about José Manuel Barroso’s business activities with Goldman Sachs.

In Spring 2018, after publishing an op-ed in Le Monde and Politico, Alemanno lodged a complaint before the European Ombudsman arguing that the EU Disinformation Review violates the freedom of expression and right of defense.

Alemanno campaigned and drafted the first EU directive aimed at protecting whistleblowers in the European Union. His text was used by the EU Commission in 2018 when putting foreword its proposal.

In 2020 Alemanno was part of the citizens committee that started the European Citizens Initiative, Voters without Borders, calling the EU to confer full political rights to all citizens regardless where they reside.

He provided pro bono legal assistance to the ECI initiators before, during and after the signature collection against reauthorization of glyphosate in Europe.

He lodged a collective complaint on behalf of the European Youth Forum to challenge the institutionalization of unpaid internships in Belgium before the Council of Europe.

Alemanno is member of the Board of Advisers of Palumba.org, which runs the European voting advice application Palumba.

== Political career ==
In the Italian legislative elections of 2018, Alberto Alemanno was a candidate for the Senate for the Più Europa party led by Emma Bonino. He obtained 5,613 preference votes and was not elected.

== Awards ==
- Ashoka Fellow 2019
- BMW Responsible Leader 2017
- Young Global Leader, World Economic Forum 2015.
- European Young Leaders (EYL40) by the "40 under 40" run by Friends of Europe in 2013

== Media ==
He has published in leading international law journals, such as the International Journal of Constitutional Law, the Harvard International Law Journal and the Common Market Law Review, and authored books with university publishers and edited volumes. He’s the author of more than 40 articles. He is the founder and editor-in-chief of the European Journal of Risk Regulation. He contributes to scholarly blogs, including Verfassungsblog, and the Italian legal blog Diritti Comparati, which he co-founded.

== Academic and civil society initiatives ==
Alemanno created and participated in different initiatives combining academia and NGOs.

=== List of initiatives ===
- EU Public Interest Clinic, together with HEC Paris and NYU School of Law. The Clinic brings together students from NYU Law School and HEC Paris to help non-government organizations (NGOs)
- eLabEurope which promotes civic engagement and participation in Europe through a mixture of academic research, advocacy and training.
- The Good Lobby aimed at fostering active citizenship and accountability via citizen-lobbyists
- Summer Academy in Global Law & Policy], which has more than 400 international alumni since its inception in 2009 and was transformed into The Lobbying Summer Academy in 2018.
- TEN – The European Nudge Network in 2014. Its goal is to offer insight into the behaviour of organizations throughout Europe.

== Books ==
- Reinventing Legal Education (Cambridge University Press, 2018) ( with L. Khadar)
- Lobbying for Change: Find Your Voice to Create a Better Society (London: Iconbooks), 2017.
- The New Intellectual Property of Health – Beyond Plain Packaging (Edward Elgar, 2016) (ed. with E. Bonadio)
- Nudge and the Law – A European Perspective (Oxford Hart Publishing, 2015) – (ed. with A-L. Sibony)
- Regulating Lifestyle Risks – Europe, Alcohol, Tobacco and Unhealthy Diets – (Cambridge University Press, 2014), ed. with A. Garde
- Routledge Handbook of Risk Studies (Routledge, 2015) (ed. with Adam Burgess and Jens Zinn)
- Better Business Regulation in a Risk Society (Springer, 2013) – (ed. with F. den Butter, A. Nijsen and J. Torriti)
- Foundations of EU Food Law & Policy – Ten Years of European Food Safety Authority – (Ashgate, 2013) (ed. with S. Gabbi)
- Governing Disasters – The Challenges of Emergency Risk Regulation – (ed. Edward Elgar, 2011)
- Trade in Food – Regulatory and Judicial Approaches in the EU and the WTO – (Cameron May, London 2nd ed., 2007)

== See also ==
- Laurent Pech
- Kim Lane Scheppele
- Dimitry Kochenov
- Gráinne de Búrca
- Paul Craig (legal scholar)
- Loïc Azoulai
- Deirdre Curtin
- European Rule of Law Mechanism
