= Rule of Law Report =

Annual European Commission assessment of rule-of-law developments

The Rule of Law Report, also referred to as the EU Rule of Law Report, is an annual assessment published by the European Commission on significant rule of law developments in the member states of the European Union. It is the principal output of the European Rule of Law Mechanism and forms the basis of the Commission's Annual Rule of Law Cycle. The report examines positive and negative developments under four pillars: national justice systems, anti-corruption frameworks, media pluralism and freedom, and institutional checks and balances.

First published in 2020, each edition consists of a general communication describing developments across the EU and separate chapters for each country covered. Since 2022, the chapters for member states have included non-binding country-specific recommendations and an assessment of progress in implementing recommendations from previous editions. In 2024, the report was expanded to include Albania, Montenegro, North Macedonia and Serbia as part of the EU enlargement process. The seventh edition was published on 17 July 2026.

The report is intended as a preventive and dialogue-based instrument rather than an enforcement procedure. Neither the report nor its recommendations are legally enforceable. It has nevertheless become one of the EU's principal rule-of-law monitoring tools, providing evidence for political dialogue and for separate mechanisms including infringement procedures, the Rule of Law Conditionality Regulation, the Article 7 procedure, the European Semester and assessments under the Recovery and Resilience Facility. Its findings and follow-up have been particularly prominent in EU responses to developments in Poland and Hungary.

== History ==
=== Background and establishment ===
The rule of law is one of the values on which the European Union is founded under Article 2 of the Treaty on European Union. Before the introduction of the Rule of Law Report, the EU monitored or responded to rule-of-law issues through several separate instruments, including Article 7, infringement proceedings, the EU Justice Scoreboard, the European Semester and the Mechanism for Cooperation and Verification applied to Bulgaria and Romania.

In 2016, the European Parliament called for the establishment of a formal EU mechanism on democracy, the rule of law and fundamental rights. Parliament proposed an interinstitutional agreement involving the Parliament, Commission and Council of the European Union, intended to integrate existing monitoring and enforcement instruments into a regular review cycle.

In July 2019, the Commission adopted the communication Strengthening the rule of law within the Union: A blueprint for action. It proposed an annual reporting cycle covering every member state, a network of national rule-of-law contact points and closer dialogue with national authorities, parliaments and civil society. In her political guidelines for the 2019–2024 Commission, Commission president Ursula von der Leyen also committed to establishing a comprehensive rule-of-law mechanism with objective annual reporting covering all member states.

The first Rule of Law Report was published on 30 September 2020. It contained a horizontal assessment of developments across the EU and individual chapters for all 27 member states. Its preparation involved written submissions from national governments, more than 200 stakeholder contributions and over 300 meetings with national authorities, judicial bodies, journalists and civil society organisations. The first and second reports also examined the effect of emergency measures adopted during the COVID-19 pandemic on parliamentary scrutiny, access to information and other institutional checks and balances.

=== Subsequent development ===
Country-specific recommendations were introduced in the third report, published in July 2022. All member states began receiving recommendations, regardless of whether the Commission had identified major or more limited concerns. Subsequent reports assessed the progress made in implementing them.

In 2024, the country assessment was extended for the first time to Albania, Montenegro, North Macedonia and Serbia. The four countries were selected on the basis of their progress in the accession process and their level of preparedness in rule-of-law matters. They participate in the reporting process, including through written submissions and country visits, while their accession-related recommendations continue to be issued through the Commission's annual Enlargement Package.

The sixth edition, published on 8 July 2025, introduced a stronger emphasis on the relationship between the rule of law and the European single market. The Commission examined matters such as the handling of commercial cases, regulatory stability, the independence of regulatory authorities, judicial review of administrative decisions and the effects of corruption and institutional instability on businesses, particularly small and medium-sized enterprises. The single-market dimension was incorporated across the existing four pillars rather than established as a separate pillar.

== Methodology ==
=== Structure of the report ===
Each edition normally contains:

- a horizontal communication describing major developments and common trends across the EU;
- an individual chapter for every member state and each participating enlargement country;
- country-specific recommendations for member states;
- an assessment of progress in implementing recommendations from previous editions; and
- annexes identifying written submissions and organisations consulted during the preparation process.

Country chapters are not intended to provide an exhaustive account of every rule-of-law matter in each country. They concentrate on significant new developments and on previously identified issues that remain unresolved. The depth of coverage may therefore vary according to the seriousness, persistence or systemic nature of the developments under consideration.

The assessment is principally qualitative. The Commission evaluates national developments against obligations under EU law, the case law of the Court of Justice of the European Union, the European Convention on Human Rights and the case law of the European Court of Human Rights. It also uses standards and recommendations developed by the Council of Europe, including the Venice Commission, the Group of States against Corruption and the European Commission for the Efficiency of Justice.

=== Preparation process ===
Preparation generally begins with a questionnaire and a request for written contributions from member states and participating enlargement countries. A targeted consultation is also opened to judicial and professional organisations, civil society groups, universities, business associations, media organisations and international institutions.

Commission officials subsequently conduct country visits, normally between January and April. They meet government representatives, judges and prosecutors, independent authorities, journalists, national human rights institutions and civil society organisations. Draft country chapters are then sent to the relevant national authorities, which may propose factual corrections or provide updated information. The final assessment and recommendations remain the political responsibility of the Commission.

For the 2025 report, the Commission organised more than 650 meetings during country visits and received approximately 270 horizontal and country-specific stakeholder submissions.

Sources used in the report include:

- submissions from national authorities and stakeholders;
- the EU Justice Scoreboard and other Commission data;
- reports by the Council of Europe, the Organisation for Economic Co-operation and Development, the Organization for Security and Co-operation in Europe and the United Nations;
- judgments of European and national courts;
- information from the European Union Agency for Fundamental Rights;
- the Media Pluralism Monitor and journalist-safety monitoring platforms;
- Eurobarometer surveys and other perception indicators; and
- reports by national courts of auditors, ombudsman institutions, anti-corruption authorities and civil society organisations.

The Commission states that perception surveys and composite indexes are interpreted cautiously and within the relevant national context. The same general monitoring framework is applied to every member state, but the Commission does not calculate an aggregate score or produce a ranking of national rule-of-law performance.

== Areas covered ==
=== Justice systems ===
The first pillar assesses the independence, quality and efficiency of national justice systems. It covers civil, administrative and criminal proceedings, including prosecution services and the enforcement of judgments.

The subjects examined include:

- the appointment, promotion, transfer and dismissal of judges;
- the composition and independence of councils for the judiciary;
- disciplinary and ethical rules applying to judges;
- the autonomy and accountability of prosecution services;
- the independence of lawyers and bar associations;
- access to legal aid and the courts;
- court funding, staffing and digitalisation;
- the length of proceedings and enforcement of judgments; and
- public and business perceptions of judicial independence.

The analysis draws extensively on the EU Justice Scoreboard, judgments of the Court of Justice and European Court of Human Rights, and reports by European judicial networks and Council of Europe bodies.

=== Anti-corruption framework ===
The second pillar assesses the institutional and legal capacity of each country to prevent, investigate, prosecute and sanction corruption. It considers both the design of national anti-corruption systems and their practical effectiveness.

The areas examined include:

- national anti-corruption strategies and specialised authorities;
- the criminalisation and prosecution of corruption offences;
- investigations and final judgments in high-level and complex corruption cases;
- asset and interest declarations by public officials;
- conflict-of-interest rules;
- lobbying regulation and transparency;
- restrictions on revolving-door employment;
- whistleblower protection;
- political immunity and limitation periods; and
- corruption risks in sectors such as public procurement and healthcare.

The Commission uses national criminal-justice data, Eurobarometer surveys, assessments by GRECO, OECD and United Nations bodies, and information from the European Anti-Fraud Office and European Public Prosecutor's Office.

=== Media pluralism and freedom ===
The third pillar considers whether the legal and institutional environment allows independent and pluralistic media to operate without improper political or economic interference.

The subjects covered include:

- the independence and resources of media regulatory authorities;
- transparency and concentration of media ownership;
- the allocation of state advertising and public-information campaigns;
- the governance and editorial independence of public-service media;
- access to public information and documents;
- the protection of journalists from threats, violence and surveillance;
- investigations into attacks on journalists; and
- legal intimidation, including strategic lawsuits against public participation.

The assessment uses data from the Media Pluralism Monitor, European media regulators, journalist associations, the Council of Europe platform for the safety of journalists and international press-freedom organisations.

=== Checks and balances ===
The fourth pillar covers the institutions and procedures that constrain public power and permit scrutiny of executive and legislative action.

It examines:

- the transparency and inclusiveness of the law-making process;
- public consultation and the use of accelerated or emergency legislative procedures;
- constitutional and judicial review of legislation;
- compliance with judgments of European and national courts;
- the independence and effectiveness of ombudsman offices and national human rights institutions;
- access to, and judicial review of, administrative decisions;
- the operation of constitutional courts;
- the use and oversight of emergency powers; and
- the legal and financial environment for civil society organisations and human-rights defenders.

== Recommendations and follow-up ==
Recommendations were first issued to every member state in the 2022 report. That edition contained 145 recommendations: 40 concerning justice systems, 52 concerning anti-corruption frameworks, 32 concerning media pluralism and freedom, and 21 concerning checks and balances.

Under the Commission's methodology, recommendations must be based on the analysis in the relevant country chapter, proportionate to the identified challenge and sufficiently specific to permit concrete follow-up. They may encourage the continuation of reforms already under way as well as require action on newly identified concerns. They are formulated with regard to national constitutional arrangements and do not prescribe a uniform institutional model.

Each subsequent report evaluates implementation using categories including:

- no progress;
- limited progress;
- some progress;
- significant progress; and
- full implementation.

The classification applies to the implementation of the individual recommendation rather than to the overall rule-of-law situation in a country. Recommendations may be repeated, adjusted or removed depending on the Commission's assessment of progress.

In the 2025 report, the Commission classified 57 per cent of the recommendations issued in 2024 as at least partially implemented. This included some progress on 39 per cent and significant progress or full implementation on 18 per cent. Limited progress was recorded on 14 per cent, with no progress on the remainder.

The Rule of Law Report does not issue recommendations to the four participating enlargement countries. Recommendations concerning them are made through the annual Enlargement Package and the accession negotiation process.

== Results and impact ==
=== Governance and relationship with enforcement mechanisms ===
Following publication, the Commission discusses the report and its recommendations with national governments, parliaments, judicial institutions and civil society. The Council uses the country chapters as a basis for its annual rule-of-law dialogue, while the European Parliament holds a debate and normally adopts a non-legislative resolution on each edition. The Commission also organises national rule-of-law dialogues and technical follow-up meetings with member states.

The report's direct outputs are a common evidentiary record, country-specific recommendations and a framework for recurring political and institutional dialogue. It does not impose sanctions, suspend EU funding or itself establish a breach of EU law. Its findings may, however, inform separate infringement proceedings, Article 7 proceedings, assessments under the Rule of Law Conditionality Regulation, the European Semester, national recovery and resilience plans, and the administration of cohesion and other EU funds.

The Commission has described the report as an important source of information for the possible application of the Conditionality Regulation. A concern identified in a country chapter does not automatically constitute a breach for the purposes of that regulation. The Commission must conduct a separate assessment establishing, among other requirements, a sufficiently direct connection between a breach of rule-of-law principles and the sound financial management of the EU budget or the protection of the Union's financial interests. Similarly, a "serious concern" in a country chapter is not automatically equivalent to the "clear risk of a serious breach" required under Article 7 or to a legally actionable violation in an infringement proceeding.

=== Poland ===
Successive country chapters on Poland documented concerns about judicial independence, changes to the National Council of the Judiciary, the disciplinary system for judges, the status of judicial appointments, the independence of the Constitutional Tribunal, the prosecution service, public-service media and the operating environment for civil society during the Law and Justice-led governments.

Following the change of government in December 2023, the Polish authorities presented an Action Plan on the Rule of Law intended to address the issues raised in the Commission's 2017 reasoned proposal under Article 7 and in judgments of the Court of Justice of the European Union and the European Court of Human Rights. In May 2024, the Commission concluded that there was no longer a clear risk of a serious breach of the rule of law and closed the Article 7(1) procedure against Poland. It stated that implementation of the Action Plan would continue to be monitored through the annual Rule of Law Report.

In February 2024, the Commission adopted two legal acts allowing Poland to access up to €137 billion in EU funding. It found that Poland had fulfilled judicial-independence milestones attached to its recovery plan, permitting an initial payment of €6.3 billion and opening access to an allocation of up to €59.8 billion under the Recovery and Resilience Facility. The Commission also found that Poland fulfilled the horizontal enabling condition concerning the Charter of Fundamental Rights of the European Union, allowing access to up to €76.5 billion under cohesion, maritime, fisheries and home-affairs programmes. These decisions were taken under the rules governing the Recovery and Resilience Facility and cohesion funding, rather than under the Rule of Law Report itself.

The 2025 country chapter found that significant efforts had been made to implement the Action Plan, while important institutional questions remained unresolved. Proposed reforms concerning the National Council of the Judiciary, judges appointed following nominations by the post-2017 Council, the structure of the Supreme Court, the Constitutional Tribunal and the separation of the offices of Minister of Justice and Prosecutor General had not been completed. The Commission repeated recommendations concerning the judiciary, prosecution service, lobbying and asset-declaration rules, high-level corruption, media regulation, public-service media and civil society. Continued monitoring after the closure of the Article 7 procedure illustrated the report's function as a long-term follow-up mechanism separate from formal enforcement proceedings.

=== Hungary and the conditionality mechanism ===
The country chapters on Hungary repeatedly identified concerns relating to judicial governance, high-level corruption, public procurement, political and state advertising, the independence of the media regulator and public-service media, emergency law-making, access to public information and restrictions affecting civil society organisations.

In 2022, the Commission initiated the first procedure under the Conditionality Regulation. The Council subsequently suspended 55 per cent of the commitments under three Hungarian cohesion-policy programmes, amounting to approximately €6.3 billion. The decision concerned systemic deficiencies in public procurement, the effectiveness of prosecutorial action and measures to prevent and prosecute corruption. The Council concluded that Hungary's proposed remedial measures contained significant weaknesses and did not sufficiently reduce the risks to the EU budget.

The procedure prompted Hungary to adopt measures including the establishment of an Integrity Authority and Anti-Corruption Task Force, changes to public-procurement rules and a procedure allowing judicial review of prosecutorial decisions not to investigate or prosecute certain corruption offences. Later Rule of Law Reports monitored the implementation and practical effects of these reforms, while formal reassessments of the financial measures were conducted separately under the Conditionality Regulation.

Following two Commission reassessments, the Council measures remained in force, and €1 billion in commitments was irreversibly decommitted by 31 December 2024. The 2025 country chapter found no progress on establishing a robust record of investigations, prosecutions and final judgments in high-level corruption cases. It also recorded no progress on lobbying and revolving-door regulation, the independence of the media regulator, the distribution of state advertising, the independence of public-service media or the removal of obstacles affecting civil society organisations.

Payments under Hungary's recovery plan were separately made dependent on the fulfilment of 27 rule-of-law-related "super milestones", including requirements connected with judicial independence, anti-corruption safeguards, public procurement and the conditionality procedure. The Commission stated in the 2025 country chapter that no ordinary Recovery and Resilience Facility payment could be made until all of the super milestones had been satisfactorily fulfilled. These restrictions were legally distinct from the suspension imposed under the Conditionality Regulation.

=== Political and institutional ramifications ===
The treatment of Poland and Hungary made the relationship between annual monitoring and access to EU funding a prominent issue in interinstitutional and national political debate. The Polish and Hungarian cases also demonstrated that portions of EU funding could be restricted or released under several distinct frameworks, including the Conditionality Regulation, the Recovery and Resilience Facility and the horizontal enabling conditions governing cohesion programmes.

A separate Commission decision in December 2023 found that Hungary had fulfilled judicial-independence requirements under the Charter of Fundamental Rights enabling condition and made approximately €10.2 billion in cohesion funding available. The European Parliament challenged the decision before the Court of Justice, alleging errors of assessment, failure to provide adequate reasons and misuse of powers. In February 2026, Advocate General Tamara Ćapeta proposed that the Court annul the Commission's decision, concluding that funding had been made available before all required reforms were in force and effectively applied. An Advocate General's opinion is not binding on the Court.

The European Parliament has repeatedly called for stronger links between negative findings in the Rule of Law Report and the use of infringement, Article 7 or budgetary instruments. The Commission has resisted an automatic connection, arguing that the instruments have different purposes, evidentiary requirements and legal thresholds. The European Court of Auditors similarly found that terminology used in the report does not by itself satisfy the legal conditions for other procedures.

The report's impact is consequently mainly indirect: it establishes an annual baseline, preserves an institutional record of developments, supports public and interinstitutional scrutiny and supplies information that may be used in other procedures. Its capacity to produce legal or financial consequences depends on the operation of separate instruments, court judgments and funding conditions.

== Reception and criticism ==
=== European Parliament ===
The European Parliament welcomed the establishment of a common monitoring system covering all member states. In its 2021 resolution on the first report, it described the exercise as important for creating a European rule-of-law monitoring and enforcement architecture and praised its coverage of justice, corruption, media and institutional checks.

Parliament has nevertheless repeatedly criticised aspects of the report's scope and methodology. It has argued that some editions were too descriptive and did not sufficiently distinguish isolated shortcomings from deliberate or systemic violations. It has also called for:

- clearer EU-wide and multiannual trends;
- more precise and time-bound recommendations;
- an independent panel of experts;
- stronger links between monitoring and enforcement;
- a fifth pillar devoted specifically to fundamental rights;
- more detailed treatment of prison conditions and administrative justice; and
- a formal interinstitutional agreement involving the Parliament, Commission and Council.

In April 2026, Parliament adopted its resolution on the 2025 report by 387 votes to 191, with 46 abstentions. Parliament stated that 93 per cent of the Commission's recommendations had been carried over from previous years and argued that the reporting process continued to understate some serious structural threats. It called for firmer action concerning judicial independence, high-level corruption, political interference with media, the use of spyware, restrictions on civil society and failures to implement European court judgments.

=== Academic analysis ===
In a 2022 study commissioned by the European Parliament, legal scholars Laurent Pech and Petra Bárd identified what they described as serious gaps and weaknesses in the reporting system. They argued that monitoring alone was insufficient to address deliberate and systemic violations and recommended extending the report to all values contained in Article 2 of the Treaty on European Union, involving an independent expert panel and connecting non-implementation of recommendations more directly to legal or financial action.

The study also criticised variations in the amount of detail devoted to different countries, the absence at the time of country-specific recommendations and what its authors regarded as delayed use of the EU's separate enforcement instruments. Recommendations were added to the report later in 2022.

=== European Court of Auditors ===
A 2024 review by the European Court of Auditors found that the Commission had established a systematic annual process involving member states and stakeholders and that the introduction of recommendations had improved the potential for following national reforms.

The auditors nevertheless concluded that the publicly available methodology provided limited information on how the Commission selected issues, weighed evidence, applied indicators and assessed the seriousness of concerns. They identified opportunities to improve:

- transparency concerning the standards and indicators used;
- documentation of the evidence trail;
- explanation of why particular information or issues were selected;
- consistency between country chapters, summaries and recommendations;
- presentation of multiannual trends; and
- explanation of the relationships between the report and other EU rule-of-law instruments.

The review found that, after the first year of follow-up to the 2022 recommendations, 11 per cent had been fully implemented, significant progress had been made on 13 per cent, some progress on 42 per cent and no progress on 34 per cent. It identified increasing the implementation rate as a continuing challenge, while noting that some reforms require action over several years.

The Commission has opposed turning the report into an all-encompassing assessment of every value listed in Article 2. It has argued that democracy and fundamental-rights monitoring are also addressed through other EU instruments and that an excessive expansion could duplicate existing reporting processes.

== See also ==
- Article 7 of the Treaty on European Union
- EU Justice Scoreboard
- European Union Agency for Fundamental Rights
- Mechanism for Cooperation and Verification
- Rule of Law Conditionality Regulation
- Rule of law
- European Semester
- Polish constitutional crisis
