= Kim Lane Scheppele =

American scholar of law and politics

Professor Kim Lane Scheppele
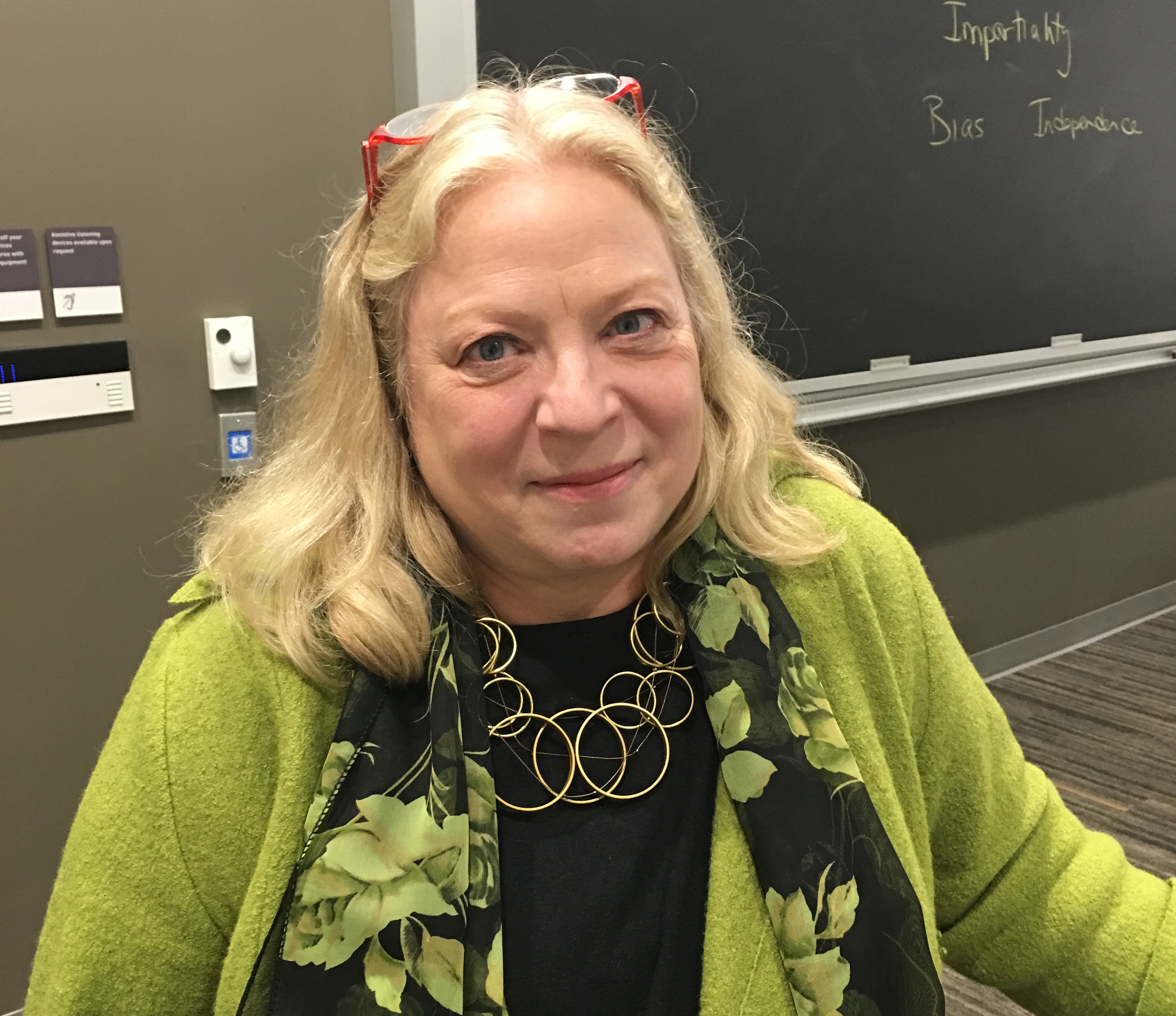
- Scheppele in October 2016
- Title: Laurance S. Rockefeller Professor of Sociology and International Affairs

Academic background
- Education: Barnard College (BA); University of Chicago (PhD)

Academic work
- Institutions: Princeton School of Public and International Affairs; University of Pennsylvania Law School

Kim Lane Scheppele is the Laurance S. Rockefeller Professor of Sociology and International Affairs at Princeton University, where she directs the Program in Law and Normative Thinking at the University Center for Human Values. Scheppele works on topics related to comparative constitutional ethnography within the sociology of law.

She spent several years living in Hungary and Russia doing fieldwork on the creation of new constitutions after the revolutions of 1989. In the post-9/11 era, she became interested in the global impact of anti-terrorism laws on constitutional democracies. Her research on autocracy and democratic backsliding in the 21st century led her to expand upon the concept of autocratic legalism by Javier Corrales. She coined the term "Frankenstate" to describe the kind of governance that emerges from autocratic legalism.

Her book Legal Secrets: Equality and Efficiency in the Common Law (1988) received multiple awards. For her research advancing law and society, she was awarded the Kalven Prize in 2014. She was elected to the American Academy of Arts and Sciences in 2016. She is currently recognized as an expert on authoritarian regimes.

== Early life and education ==
Scheppele earned her A.B. in urban studies from Barnard College in 1975. As an undergraduate she was influenced by her teachers and advisers Robert K. Merton, Herbert J. Gans and Guillermina Jasso. After receiving her A.B., she worked as a newspaper journalist before pursuing graduate studies at the University of Chicago. She found inspiration in the work of legal scholar Karl Llewellyn (The Bramble Bush: On Our Law and Its Study), in the cultural anthropology of Clifford Geertz ( Local Knowledge), and in the philosophy of Ludwig Wittgenstein (Philosophical Investigations) and Alfred Schütz (Phenomenology of the Social World). She cites her courses by Brian Simpson as the key influence and development of her legal philosophy and approach. She received an M.A. in 1977 and a Ph.D. in sociology in 1985. Arthur Stinchcombe, Edward Shils, James Coleman, and Richard Posner were on her dissertation committee.

== Career ==
Scheppele was at the University of Michigan from 1984 to 1996, and was an Arthur F. Thurnau Professor from 1993 until her departure for Penn. After the Hungarian Parliament passed a resolution to establish the Constitutional Court of Hungary in 1989, Scheppele received a grant from the National Science Foundation to study it. She moved to Hungary in 1994, where she spent the next four years working at the Constitutional Court and teaching at Central European University. She also learned the Hungarian language.

In addition to working as a researcher at the Constitutional Court during the socialist-liberal coalition government of Gyula Horn, she served as an expert advisor to the constitutional drafting committee of the Hungarian Parliament from 1995-1996. Scheppele was the founding Co-Director of the MA Program in Gender and Culture at Central European University, when the program was first accredited and CEU was still located in Budapest. Scheppele joined the Princeton faculty in 2005, after nearly a decade as the John J. O'Brien Professor of Comparative Law and Professor of Sociology at the University of Pennsylvania Law School, where she is still a faculty fellow.

== Research ==
Scheppele's research focuses on the dynamics of constitutional governance, a research topic that arose after the revolutions of 1989 and the dissolution of communist governments in Eastern Europe. She lived in Hungary and Russia during this time, giving her insight into the subject as new constitutions emerged out of the chaos. She continued her research on constitutional government after the September 11 attacks, analyzing the impact of new laws on constitutional integrity created during the global war on terror.

In the aftermath of the 2008 financial crisis, she began to look at autocratic legalism and how it leads to democratic backsliding when leaders are elected by popular vote and then work to dismantle the very system which got them elected. Scheppele coined the term "Frankenstate" to describe this new kind of legal, but illiberal governance created by autocrats from the pieces of disparate, democratic constitutional provisions. The metaphor of the Frankenstate draws inspiration from the image of Frankenstein's monster, a simulacrum of a person created from different body parts which when put together produced a so-called monster. To illustrate the Frankenstate, Scheppele points to the rise of illiberal autocracies in the European Union, particularly the deteriorating state of human rights and weakening of the rule of law in Hungary under the government of Viktor Orbán.

Scheppele argues that Orbán borrowed separate pieces from democratic governments—gerrymandering in the United States, first-past-the-post voting in Britain, and the winner compensation rule in Italy—all of which, when combined with election rules unique to Hungary, produce the Frankenstate. These separate pieces give the deceptive appearance of democratic norms and functions to election monitors, but when put together as a whole, often work against democracy in practice and promote autocracy. Scheppele notes that the Frankenstate tactic is not unique to Hungary, and can be found in Turkey and even the United States.

In her research, Scheppele discusses how to stop creeping autocracy. Scheppele testified in 2013 before the Commission on Security and Cooperation in Europe, warning that Hungary was moving towards authoritarianism and oligarchy. She has also written about the threat Trumpism poses to American democracy.

After Trump denied being a dictator, but also added "A lot of people are saying, 'Maybe we like a dictator'", Scheppele commented on the changing status of governance in the United States. She initially declined to describe Trump as a dictator or his administration as a dictatorship until September 2025. "If I was hesitating before", she told The Guardian, "it's this mobilization of the national guard and the indication that he plans to overtake resistance by force that now means we're in it...He's really planning a military, repressive force, to go out into the streets of the places that are most likely to resist his dictatorship and to just put down the whole thing by force." Other experts like political scientist Steven Levitsky initially were skeptical, but by late 2025, Levitsky had softened his stance, arguing along with Daniel Ziblatt that the United States had become a competitive authoritarian regime, with Trump now using language similar to that of a military dictator.

== Selected bibliography ==
- "How Viktor Orbán Wins". Journal of Democracy. 33 (3): 45-61. (July 2022).
- With Arianna Vedaschi (eds.), 9/11 and the Rise of Global Anti-Terrorism Law: How the UN Security Council Rules the World (Cambridge University Press, July 2021).
- With Dimitry Kochenov and Barbara Grabowska-Moroz, "EU Values are Law, After All: Enforcing EU Values through Systemic Infringement Actions by the European Commission and the Member States of the European Union", 29 Yearbook of European Law 3-121 (2021).
- With David Pozen. "Executive Underreach, in Pandemics and Otherwise". American Journal of International Law, November 2020.
- With Kriszta Kovács. "The Fragility of an Independent Judiciary: Lessons from Hungary and Poland – and the European Union." 51 Journal of Communist and Post-Communist Studies 189-200 (2018).
- "The Party's Over." pp. 495–515 in Mark Graber, Sanford Levinson and Mark Tushnet (eds.), Constitutional Democracy in Crisis? Oxford University Press, 2018.
- "Autocratic Legalism." 85 University of Chicago Law Review 545-583 (2018).
- With Laurent Pech. "Illiberalism Within: Rule of Law Backsliding in the European Union." Cambridge Yearbook of European Law (2017).
- "Enforcing the Basic Principles of EU Law through Systemic Infringement Procedures." In Dimitry Kochenov and Carlos Closa (eds.), Reinforcing the Rule of Law Oversight in the European Union (Cambridge University Press, 2016).
- "The Empire of Security and the Security of Empire." 27 Temple Journal of Comparative and International Law 241-278 (2014).
- "The Rule of Law and the Frankenstate: Why Governance Checklists Do Not Work." 26 Governance 559-562 (2013).
- "The Empire's New Laws: Terrorism and the New Security Empire after 9/11." pp. 245–278 in George Steinmetz (ed.), Sociology and Empire. (Duke University Press, 2013).
- With Miklós Bánkuti and Gábor Halmai. "Hungary's Illiberal Turn: Dismantling the Constitution." 21 (3) Journal of Democracy 138-145 (2012).
- "The New Judicial Deference." 92 Boston University Law Review 89-170 (2012).
- "The International Standardization of National Security Law." 4 Journal of National Security Law and Policy 437-453 (2010).
- "Exceptions that Prove the Rule: Embedding Emergency Government in Everyday Constitutional Life." pp. 124–154 in Stephen Macedo and Jeff Tulis (eds.), The Limits of Constitutional Democracy (Princeton University Press, 2010).
- "Guardians of the Constitution: Constitutional Court Presidents and the Struggle for the Rule of Law in Post-Soviet Europe." 154 University of Pennsylvania Law Review 1757-1851 (2006).
- "Small Emergencies." 40 Georgia Law Review 835-862 (2006).
- Hypothetical Torture in the War on Terrorism.” 1 Journal of National Security Law and Policy 285-340 (2005).
- "'We Forgot About the Ditches:' Russian Constitutional Impatience and the Challenge of Terrorism." 53 Drake Law Review 963-1027 (2005).
- "Constitutional Ethnography: An Introduction." 38(3) Law and Society Review 389-406 (2004).
- "A Realpolitik Defense of Social Rights." 82(7) University of Texas Law Review 1921-1961 (2004).
- "Law in a Time of Emergency: States of Exception and the Temptations of 9/11." 6 (5) University of Pennsylvania Journal of Constitutional Law 1001-1083 (2004).
- "Aspirational and Aversive Constitutionalism: The Case for Studying Cross-Constitutional Influence through Negative Models." 1(2) I-CON (International Journal of Constitutional Law) 296-324 (2003).
- "When the Law Doesn't Count: The Rule of Law and Election 2000." 149 University of Pennsylvania Law Review 1361-1437 (2001).
- "The Inevitable Corruption of Transition." 14 University of Connecticut Journal of International Law 509-532 (1999).
- "Manners of Imagining the Real." 19 Law and Social Inquiry 995-1022 (1994).
- "Law without Accidents." In Social Theory for a Changing Society. Edited by Pierre Bourdieu and James S. Coleman (Westview Press, 1991).
- "Facing Facts in Legal Interpretation." 30 Representations 42-77 (1990).
- Legal Secrets: Equality and Efficiency in the Common Law. (Chicago: University of Chicago Press, 1988.)

== See also ==
- Laurent Pech
- Alberto Alemanno
- Dimitry Kochenov
- Gráinne de Búrca
- Paul Craig (legal scholar)
- Loïc Azoulai
- Deirdre Curtin
- European Rule of Law Mechanism
