= Dimitry Kochenov =

Professor of legal studies

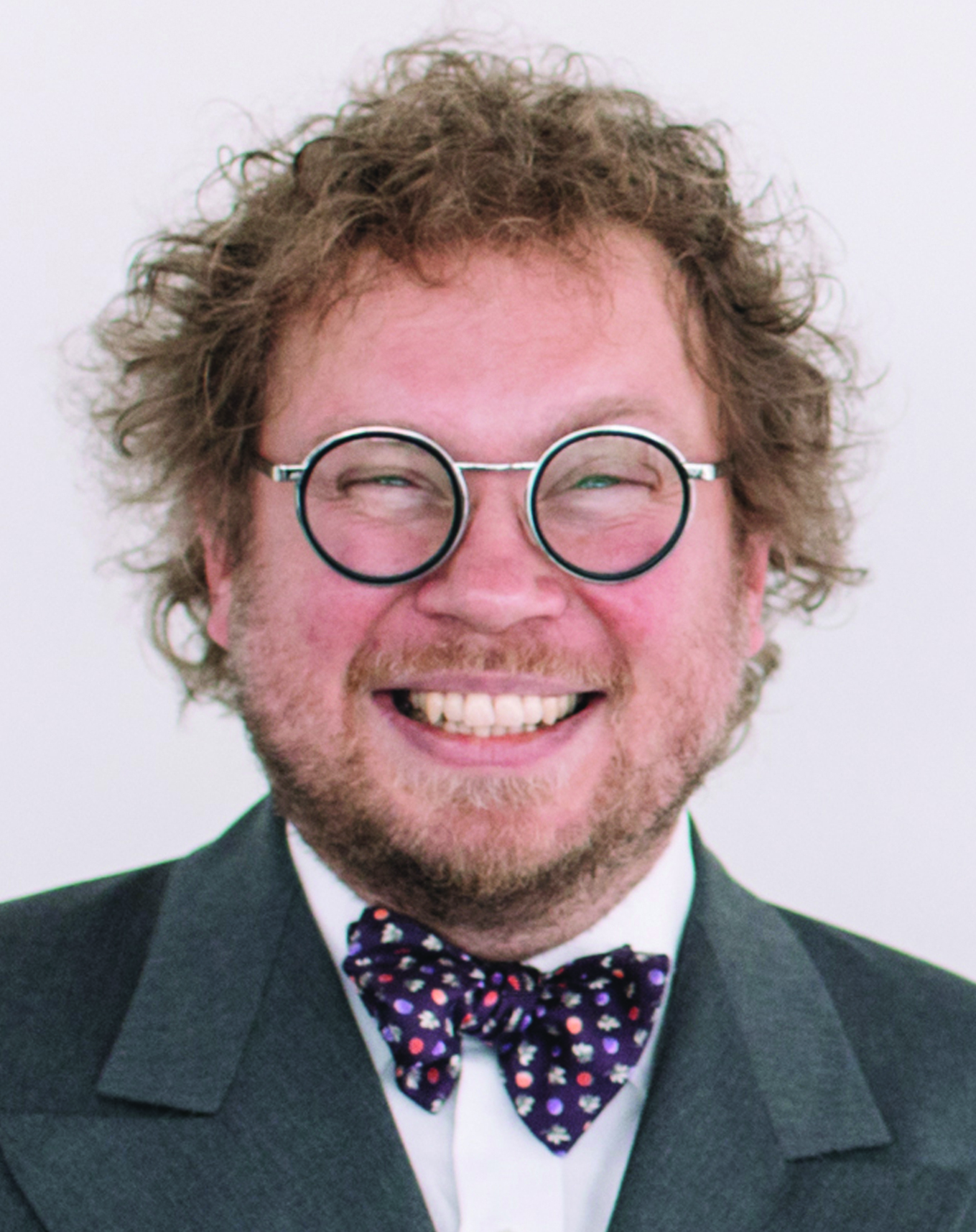
- Kochenov in 2017
- Born: Gorky, RSFSR, USSR
- Citizenship: Dutch
- Occupation: Professor at Central European University
- Known for: Criticism of citizenship

Academic background
- Education: University of Groningen

Academic work
- Notable works: Citizenship (MIT Press, 2019)
- Notable ideas: Citizenship abolitionism
- Website: kochenov.eu

Dimitry Vladimirovich Kochenov is a Soviet-born Dutch legal scholar at the Central European University (CEU), where he is a senior research fellow at the Democracy Institute, leads its Rule of Law Workgroup and teaches in the Department of Legal Studies. He is known as a critic of the concept of citizenship.

== Biography ==
Kochenov was born in Gorky, RSFSR on April 24, 1979. He attended Dobrolyubov State Linguistic University and Lobachevsky State University, both in Nizhny Novgorod, from 1996 to 2001 and graduated with a joint BA/MA in French History and an LL.B. He received an LL.M. from the Central European University in 2002 and a Ph.D. from the University of Groningen in 2007. He worked as a professor at the University of Groningen from 2006 to 2019 before returning to CEU. His 2019 book Citizenship, published by MIT Press, was well-received and translated into several languages.

Kochenov has criticized the notion of citizenship as an unjustifiable form of apartheid, tracing its origins to racism, sexism, and slavery, and advocated its complete abolition. Together with Chrisian Kälin he published Quality of Nationality Index showcasing how unequal citizenships of the world are, contributing to global inequalities. He engaged in the study of investment migration programmes, publishing co-edited volumes with Cambridge and Bloomsbury and criticized attempts of the European Commission to restrict investment migration. Kochenov has advised governments, including the Dutch and the Maltese and international institutions on legal matters, particularly those pertaining to citizenship and matters of constitutional law. He coined the notion of "EU Lawlessness Law" with Sarah Ganty to describe the deployment of supranational law in the service of impunity and mass violations of human rights.

Following a 2019 prime-time questioning by Dutch news program Nieuwsuur of investment-based naturalisations, which they called "passport trade", University of Groningen conducted an investigation into Kochenov's paid consulting activities related to citizenship by investment or investment naturalisation, including his role with Henley & Partners and advising the Maltese Government on the legal amendments to introduce citizenship by investment. In 2020, a University of Groningen investigation concluded that he was not involved in the alleged ‘Maltese passport trade’, nevertheless giving Kochenov a warning as he failed to comply with the approval procedure for additional activities set out in the applicable university regulations. Kochenov has received a mixture of criticism and support from academic colleagues on the matter of academic integrity.

After the investigation, Kochenov left Groningen for Oxford, where he co-taught a course on Citizenship by Investment, and then CEU.

== See also ==
- Laurent Pech
- Alberto Alemanno
- Kim Lane Scheppele
- Gráinne de Búrca
- Paul Craig (legal scholar)
- Loïc Azoulai
- Deirdre Curtin
- European Rule of Law Mechanism
- Henley Passport Index
- Quality of Nationality Index
