= Laurent Pech =

French legal scholar

Academic background
- Education: Sciences Po Aix; Aix-Marseille University

Academic work
- Discipline: Law
- Sub-discipline: European Union law Constitutional law Human rights law
- Institutions: University College Dublin; Middlesex University; University of Galway
- Main interests: Rule of law, judicial independence, democratic backsliding

Laurent Pech is a French legal scholar specialising in European Union law, the rule of law and judicial independence. He is a full professor of law and the dean and head of the Sutherland School of Law at University College Dublin (UCD). His research has examined rule-of-law backsliding in the European Union, particularly developments affecting courts and other constitutional institutions in Hungary and Poland.

== Education and academic career ==
Pech graduated from the Institute of Political Studies of Aix-en-Provence in 1996 and received a master's degree in public law and a doctorate in law from the Faculty of Law of Aix-en-Provence, now part of Aix-Marseille University. He also studied at the University of Limerick in 1994–1995 and the University of Wisconsin–Madison in 1996–1997.

From 1998 to 2003, he worked as a teaching assistant at the Faculty of Law of Aix-en-Provence. During this period, he worked for the Office of the High Representative in Bosnia and Herzegovina and as a legal clerk to French constitutional scholar Louis Favoreu, who served as an international judge of the Constitutional Court of Bosnia and Herzegovina. He subsequently held a postdoctoral research fellowship at the Canada Research Chair on Globalization, Citizenship and Democracy and was an Emile Noël Fellow at New York University School of Law.

Pech joined the University of Galway, then known as the National University of Ireland, Galway, as a Jean Monnet lecturer in EU public law in 2004. He later became professor of European law and head of the Department of Law and Politics at Middlesex University. From 2014 to 2017, he held a Jean Monnet Chair in European public law. He has also been a visiting professor at the University of Bordeaux and a senior research fellow at the Democracy Institute of Central European University.

In October 2022, Pech became dean of the UCD Sutherland School of Law and was appointed full professor of law at the university. He has served on the editorial board of the Hague Journal on the Rule of Law and on the advisory boards of several European research and civil-society projects.

== Research and public engagement ==
Pech's scholarship focuses on the meaning and enforcement of the rule of law in EU law, democratic and rule-of-law backsliding, judicial independence and the EU's mechanisms for responding to systemic breaches of its foundational values. His work has examined institutional developments in Hungary and Poland and the effectiveness of measures adopted by the European Commission, the European Parliament and the Court of Justice of the European Union (CJEU).

From 2018 to 2022, he was principal investigator of the rule-of-law work package of RECONNECT, a research project funded through the EU's Horizon 2020 programme. The project studied democracy, citizens' trust and the rule of law in the European Union. He was also the lead author of a 2016 study commissioned by the European Parliament on the establishment of an EU mechanism for monitoring democracy, the rule of law and fundamental rights.

Pech has frequently commented publicly on the deterioration of democratic checks and balances in Hungary and Poland. His analysis has been cited in international coverage of the Hungarian government's relationship with the European People's Party and Hungarian-Polish proposals to create an alternative rule-of-law institute.

In April 2020, Pech and Polish civic activist Martin Mycielski co-authored an open letter to European Commission vice-president Věra Jourová and justice commissioner Didier Reynders. The letter called on the Commission to bring infringement proceedings over Poland's judicial disciplinary legislation, enforce the CJEU's interim order concerning the Disciplinary Chamber of the Supreme Court, and take further action to protect judicial independence. It was supported by European legal academics, Polish judges' and prosecutors' associations and civil-society organisations.

In 2021, Pech co-founded The Good Lobby Profs, a network of legal academics engaged in pro bono research, advocacy and litigation concerning the rule of law in the European Union. The network has been involved in proceedings concerning EU funding decisions, judicial independence and access to documents held by EU institutions.

== Transparency litigation ==
In 2018, Pech requested access to an opinion of the Council of the European Union's Legal Service concerning the proposed regulation linking EU budgetary funding to respect for the rule of law. After the Council granted access to only parts of the document, he brought an action before the General Court. In April 2021, the court annulled the Council's decision refusing full access.

The Council appealed the judgment, with France and the European Commission intervening in its support. In June 2023, the Court of Justice dismissed the appeal and ordered the Council to pay Pech's costs. The litigation concerned public access to legal advice produced during the EU legislative process and the conditions under which the Council may refuse disclosure.

== Selected publications ==
- Kochenov, Dimitry; Pech, Laurent (2016). "Better Late than Never? On the European Commission's Rule of Law Framework and its First Activation". Journal of Common Market Studies. 54 (5): 1062–1074. doi:10.1111/jcms.12401. hdl:11370/500b2c25-175c-4e9e-92ba-c692c63bdb77.
- Pech, Laurent; Scheppele, Kim Lane (2017). "Illiberalism Within: Rule of Law Backsliding in the EU". Cambridge Yearbook of European Legal Studies. 19: 3–47. doi:10.1017/cel.2017.9.
- Pech, Laurent; Platon, Sébastien (2018). "Judicial Independence under Threat: The Court of Justice to the Rescue in the ASJP Case". Common Market Law Review. 55 (6): 1827–1854. doi:10.54648/COLA2018146.
- Mycielski, Martin; Pech, Laurent (29 April 2020). "When Will the EU Commission Act? An Open Letter". Verfassungsblog. doi:10.17176/20200429-133704-0.
- Pech, Laurent; Wachowiec, Patryk; Mazur, Dariusz (2021). "Poland's Rule of Law Breakdown: A Five-Year Assessment of EU's (In)Action". Hague Journal on the Rule of Law. 13 (1): 1–43. doi:10.1007/s40803-021-00151-9. PMC 7987743.
- Pech, Laurent (2022). "The Rule of Law as a Well-Established and Well-Defined Principle of EU Law". Hague Journal on the Rule of Law. 14 (2–3): 107–138. doi:10.1007/s40803-022-00176-8.

== See also ==
- Kim Lane Scheppele
- Alberto Alemanno
- Dimitry Kochenov
- Gráinne de Búrca
- Paul Craig (legal scholar)
- Loïc Azoulai
- Deirdre Curtin
- European Rule of Law Mechanism
