= Paul Craig (legal scholar) =

British academic (born 1951)

Paul Craig FBA
- Born: Paul Philip Craig; September 27, 1951 (age 75)
- Title: Professor Emeritus of English Law

Academic background
- Education: Worcester College, Oxford (MA, BCL)

Academic work
- Discipline: Constitutional law, European Union law
- Institutions: University of Oxford
- Notable works: EU Law: Text, Cases and Materials

Paul Philip Craig, FBA (born 27 September 1951) is a British legal scholar, specialising in administrative and European Union law. He was Professor of English Law at the University of Oxford from 1998 to 2019, and is now emeritus professor.

== Education and background ==
Craig was educated at Worcester College, Oxford, where he took his MA and BCL. He became a Fellow of Worcester in 1976, working alongside Francis Reynolds, and remained there until moving to St John's College, Oxford in 1998.

== Career ==
With Gráinne de Búrca, Craig is co-author of EU Law: Text, Cases and Materials, whose eighth edition was published by Oxford University Press in August 2024.

He currently teaches five-week courses in Administrative Law and European Union Law at the Indiana University School of Law-Bloomington. He also lectures in Constitutional Law at the University of Oxford, and a master's course at the University of Melbourne, Australia.

He is a member of the Whitney R. Harris World Law Institute's International Council.

== Honours ==
In 1998, Craig was elected a Fellow of the British Academy (FBA), the United Kingdom's national academy for the humanities and social sciences. He was appointed an honorary Queen's Counsel on 3 May 2000.

== Selected works ==
- Craig, Paul; de Búrca, Gráinne, eds. (2011). The evolution of EU law (2nd ed.). Oxford: Oxford University Press. ISBN 978-0199592968.

== See also ==
- Laurent Pech
- Alberto Alemanno
- Dimitry Kochenov
- Gráinne de Búrca
- Kim Lane Scheppele
- Loïc Azoulai
- Deirdre Curtin
- European Rule of Law Mechanism
