= EU Justice Scoreboard =

Annual European Commission assessment of national justice systems

The EU Justice Scoreboard is an annual comparative information tool published by the European Commission on the functioning of the justice systems of the member states of the European Union. It presents quantitative and qualitative indicators grouped principally under three headings: efficiency, quality and independence. The Scoreboard does not produce an overall ranking of national justice systems or prescribe a single institutional model. The Commission states that its indicators should instead be considered together and within the national legal and institutional context.

Introduced in 2013, the Scoreboard is used as a source of evidence in the European Semester, the Commission's annual Rule of Law Report and the assessment of justice-related reforms under the Recovery and Resilience Facility. The 2026 Scoreboard, published on 4 June 2026, was its fourteenth edition.

== History ==
The European Commission presented the first EU Justice Scoreboard on 27 March 2013 under the title The EU Justice Scoreboard: A tool to promote effective justice and growth. It was developed as part of the Commission's economic policy coordination through the European Semester, on the premise that effective and independent justice systems contributed to investment, economic growth and the enforcement of European Union law.

The first edition contained 24 datasets, drawing mainly on information collected by the European Commission for the Efficiency of Justice (CEPEJ), with most of the figures referring to 2010. Its principal scope was civil, commercial and administrative justice, rather than criminal justice. Indicators included the length of proceedings, clearance rates, numbers of pending cases, judicial budgets, numbers of judges and lawyers, judicial training, information technology, alternative dispute resolution and perceptions of judicial independence.

The range of subjects covered by subsequent editions gradually expanded. Additional indicators addressed matters such as digital access to courts, court fees and legal aid, judicial training, communication with court users, safeguards for the independence of judges and prosecutors, access to justice for children and people with disabilities, and the operation of independent public authorities. From 2020, data from the Scoreboard were also incorporated into the Commission's annual Rule of Law Report and the wider annual Rule of Law Cycle.

The 2026 edition continued a stronger focus on the functioning of the European single market that had been introduced in 2025. It included indicators concerning national competition authorities, public procurement review bodies, supreme audit institutions and transparency in lobbying. It also expanded information on equality bodies, child-friendly justice, corruption prevention, accessibility for people with disabilities and the digitalisation of justice systems.

== Methodology and indicators ==
The Scoreboard combines statistical information, descriptions of national legal arrangements and survey-based indicators. A significant part of the quantitative data is collected, checked and analysed by CEPEJ under its methodology for evaluating judicial systems. National authorities provide information through CEPEJ correspondents and a group of contact persons established by the European Commission.

Other information is obtained from organisations including the European Network of Councils for the Judiciary, the Network of the Presidents of the Supreme Judicial Courts of the European Union, the Association of the Councils of State and Supreme Administrative Jurisdictions of the European Union, the Council of Bars and Law Societies of Europe, the European Competition Network and Eurostat. Perception indicators are based partly on Eurobarometer surveys of members of the public and businesses.

The questionnaire and methodology are reviewed annually in cooperation with national contact persons. The Commission also publishes country-specific information and comments intended to explain national circumstances or changes in the data. The time periods covered vary between indicators; the statistical series in the 2026 edition generally covered developments between 2014 and 2024.

The availability and comparability of information differ between member states. The Commission has stated that data coverage has improved over successive editions, while remaining gaps generally result from limitations in national statistical capacity or differences between national case categories and the categories used by the Scoreboard.

=== Efficiency ===
Efficiency indicators assess the capacity of justice systems to manage their caseloads and deliver decisions within a reasonable period. The principal measurements include:

- the estimated time required to resolve pending cases, expressed as disposition time;
- the clearance rate, comparing the number of resolved cases with the number of incoming cases; and
- the number and age of pending cases.

The Scoreboard presents general data for civil, commercial and administrative proceedings as well as more detailed indicators for selected fields of EU law. Depending on the edition, these have included competition, electronic communications, consumer protection, intellectual property, public procurement, money laundering and environmental law.

Disposition time is a calculated estimate rather than the recorded duration of individual proceedings. It is obtained by dividing the number of unresolved cases at the end of a year by the number of cases resolved during that year and multiplying the result by 365. The Commission therefore treats it as one of several complementary measurements rather than as a complete assessment of judicial performance.

=== Quality ===
Quality indicators concern the conditions under which individuals and businesses can use the justice system and the resources available to courts. They include information on:

- court fees, exemptions and legal aid;
- access to judgments and legal information;
- judicial and court-staff training;
- financial and human resources;
- the use of surveys and standards for communicating with court users;
- access to alternative dispute resolution;
- arrangements for children, victims of crime and people with disabilities; and
- digital tools for initiating, managing and following proceedings.

Digitalisation indicators assess matters such as electronic filing, online payment of court fees, access to electronic case files, machine-readable judgments, videoconferencing and electronic communication between courts, legal professionals and court users. The Scoreboard distinguishes between the existence of digital tools in law and their practical availability in different types of proceedings.

=== Independence ===
The independence section combines survey results on perceived judicial independence with information about institutional safeguards. Eurobarometer surveys ask members of the public and businesses whether they consider courts and judges to be independent and, where respondents perceive a lack of independence, what reasons they identify.

Structural indicators examine selected national arrangements that may affect judicial independence. Depending on the edition, these have included procedures for appointing, evaluating, transferring and dismissing judges and court presidents; the composition and powers of councils for the judiciary; the operation of prosecution services; disciplinary proceedings; and safeguards concerning temporary judges and members of constitutional jurisdictions.

The Commission states that the structural indicators do not, by themselves, determine whether a justice system is independent. They are intended to show how particular safeguards are organised under national law and must be considered together with European standards, case law and the circumstances in which the rules operate.

=== Other indicators ===
Later editions have included indicators extending beyond the courts themselves, particularly where independent institutions are relevant to the application of EU law and the single market. The 2026 Scoreboard included information on the independence and functioning of national competition authorities, regulatory authorities for electronic communications, public procurement review bodies, supreme audit institutions and equality bodies. It also examined rules concerning lobbying transparency and the prevention of conflicts of interest.

== Role in European Union governance ==
The Scoreboard is a non-binding information and benchmarking instrument. It does not create legal obligations for member states or directly determine whether their justice systems comply with EU law. Its findings may nevertheless be used by the Commission to identify developments requiring further analysis and to support discussions with national authorities.

Within the European Semester, shortcomings in a national justice system that are considered to have macroeconomic significance may contribute to the Commission proposing country-specific recommendations. The Scoreboard can provide comparative evidence for such recommendations and for monitoring reforms undertaken in response to them.

Since the establishment of the annual Rule of Law Cycle in 2020, the Scoreboard has provided statistical and institutional information for the country chapters of the Commission's Rule of Law Report. The European Court of Auditors has identified it as one of the main sources used by the Commission for information on the efficiency, quality and perceived independence of justice systems.

The Commission also uses Scoreboard information when examining justice reforms included in national recovery and resilience plans. The Scoreboard does not itself determine whether a member state has met a particular reform milestone under the Recovery and Resilience Facility; that assessment is conducted separately under the rules governing the facility.

The Scoreboard has consequently been described as an instrument of coordination and peer comparison rather than a formal enforcement mechanism. Its publication allows national governments, judicial institutions, professional organisations and civil society to compare developments across member states and to identify possible examples of institutional practice.

== Reception and criticism ==
The European Parliament has generally supported the publication of comparative information about national justice systems while calling for broader and more robust indicators. In a 2018 resolution, it welcomed the Scoreboard but emphasised the need for objective criteria, accurate and comparable data, and respect for differences between national constitutional and legal systems. It also called for greater coverage of criminal justice and corruption and for stronger links between the Scoreboard and the protection of the rule of law and fundamental rights.

Erasmus University Rotterdam legal scholar Adriani Dori characterised the Scoreboard as a form of non-binding or soft governance. In a 2015 analysis, she argued that its initial emphasis on economic growth and structural reform provided a narrower perspective than a general assessment of the rule of law. She also identified the initial exclusion of criminal justice and difficulties concerning the collection and comparability of national data as limitations.

In 2021, German legal scholars András Jakab and Lando Kirchmair argued that the Scoreboard should be developed into a broader rule-of-law index. They proposed supplementing its existing indicators with structured expert assessments and aggregating the results to permit clearer comparisons between member states. They contended that the Scoreboard's original economic-policy objective and reliance on data partly supplied by national governments limited its usefulness for drawing general conclusions about the rule of law.

The Commission's decision not to calculate an aggregate score or rank member states distinguishes the Scoreboard from the type of index proposed by Jakab and Kirchmair. The Commission argues that judicial systems, constitutional arrangements and legal traditions differ between member states and that no single indicator can adequately describe their effectiveness or independence.

== See also ==
- European Commission for the Efficiency of Justice
- European Network of Councils for the Judiciary
- Judicial independence
- Law of the European Union
- Rule of law
- European Semester
