= Michael Dougan =

Professor of European law

Michael Dougan is Professor of European Law and Jean Monnet Chair in EU Law, at the University of Liverpool. He came to the attention of social media users in the United Kingdom when a video of one of his lectures was uploaded to YouTube and other social media platforms, in which he dissected the academic validity and honesty of the legal arguments presented by those advocating the UK's withdrawal from the European Union—more commonly known as "Brexit"—in the lead-up to the June 2016 referendum. During the approximately 25-minute-long viral clip, Dougan surmises the Leave campaign as "degenerat[ing] into dishonesty on an industrial scale".

Dougan has provided both written and live expert testimony to the UK Parliament; submitting to the House of Commons' European Scrutiny Committee and Foreign Affairs Select Committee, as well as the House of Lords European Union Committee, amongst others. He has also acted as an external advisor to UK Government departments on important EU legal developments, including discussions about the enactment of the European Union Act 2011, as well as the Review of the Balance of Competences Between the UK and the EU. Additionally, he has acted as a fact checker for BBC News' "Reality Check" service during the Brexit referendum.

He is a joint editor of the Common Market Law Review, a bi-monthly, peer-reviewed law journal covering European Union law.
