= International Journal of Constitutional Law =

- Discipline: Constitutional law, administrative law, international law
- Language: English, Spanish
- Edited by: Gráinne de Búrca, Joseph H. H. Weiler

Publication details
- History: Since 2003
- Publisher: Oxford University Press
- Frequency: Quarterly
- Impact factor: 1.8 (2024)

Standard abbreviations
- ISO 4: Int. J. Const. Law

Indexing
- ISSN: 1474-2640 (print); 1474-2659 (web)
- LCCN: 2003235279
- OCLC no.: 1033888329

Links
- Journal homepage; Online archive

The International Journal of Constitutional Law is a quarterly law journal covering constitutional law, administrative law, international law, and other branches of public law. It was established in 2003 by Norman Dorsen from the New York University School of Law. While originally only available in English, the journal now also publishes issues in Spanish. The journal is published by Oxford University Press and the editors-in-chief are Gráinne de Búrca and Joseph H. H. Weiler (New York University Law School). According to the Journal Citation Reports, the journal has a 2024 impact factor of 1.8.

== See also ==
- European Journal of International Law
- German Law Journal
- List of law journals
