= European Rule of Law Mechanism =

European Commission annual rule-of-law monitoring process

The European Rule of Law Mechanism, also known as the Annual Rule of Law Cycle, is an annual monitoring and dialogue process established by the European Commission to examine rule of law developments throughout the member states of the European Union. It is intended to identify positive and negative developments, encourage reforms and prevent rule-of-law problems from emerging or deteriorating. Its principal output is the annual Rule of Law Report, which contains an EU-wide assessment and individual country chapters.

The mechanism combines the preparation of the report with a network of national contact points, dialogue among the Commission, the Council of the European Union and the European Parliament, and discussions involving national governments, parliaments, independent institutions, professional organisations, civil society and other stakeholders. Since 2022, the report has included non-binding recommendations for every member state and assessments of progress in implementing earlier recommendations. Since 2024, the reporting process has also covered Albania, Montenegro, North Macedonia and Serbia, although they do not receive recommendations through the mechanism.

The European Rule of Law Mechanism is preventive and is not itself an enforcement or sanctions procedure. Its findings and recommendations are not legally binding, but information gathered through it may inform separate instruments including infringement procedures, the Article 7 procedure, the Rule of Law Conditionality Regulation, the European Semester and assessments under the Recovery and Resilience Facility. It is distinct from the rule-of-law conditionality mechanism, which can result in measures protecting the EU budget.

== History ==
=== Earlier EU instruments ===
The rule of law is one of the values on which the European Union is founded under Article 2 of the Treaty on European Union. Before the creation of the annual mechanism, the EU used several separate processes to monitor or respond to rule-of-law concerns. These included infringement proceedings, Article 7, the Commission's 2014 Rule of Law Framework, the Council's annual rule-of-law dialogue, the EU Justice Scoreboard, the European Semester and the Mechanism for Cooperation and Verification applied to Bulgaria and Romania.

The Commission's 2014 Rule of Law Framework was designed as a structured dialogue with an individual member state where the Commission identified a systemic threat to the rule of law. It could lead to a Commission assessment, recommendations and monitoring before possible use of Article 7. The European Rule of Law Mechanism introduced in 2020 differs in applying a regular preventive review to all member states, including those where no systemic threat has been identified.

=== Proposals for a comprehensive review cycle ===
In October 2016, the European Parliament called for a comprehensive EU mechanism covering democracy, the rule of law and fundamental rights. It proposed an interinstitutional agreement establishing an annual report, an independent expert panel, country-specific recommendations, an interparliamentary debate and arrangements linking monitoring with corrective procedures. The proposed system would assess both member states and EU institutions and incorporate existing monitoring instruments into a single policy cycle. Parliament repeated its call in 2018.

In April 2019, the Commission opened a debate on strengthening the EU's rule-of-law toolbox. Following consultation with EU institutions, member states, judicial networks, international organisations, civil society and academics, it adopted the communication Strengthening the rule of law within the Union: A blueprint for action in July 2019. The communication proposed a Rule of Law Review Cycle covering every member state, supported by national contact points and an annual report summarising significant developments.

In her political guidelines for the 2019–2024 Commission, Commission president Ursula von der Leyen committed to a comprehensive European rule-of-law mechanism with objective annual reporting covering all member states. The initiative formed part of the Commission's 2020 work programme.

=== Launch and subsequent development ===
In January 2020, the Commission asked every member state to appoint a national rule-of-law contact point and established a network to coordinate the preparation of the first report, discuss its methodology and provide a continuing channel of communication with national authorities. The first Rule of Law Report was published on 30 September 2020. It contained an EU-wide communication and chapters for all 27 member states, based on national submissions, stakeholder contributions and meetings with national authorities and organisations.

The Commission initially described the mechanism principally as a process of preventive monitoring and dialogue. In 2022, it added country-specific recommendations to the report and began assessing their implementation in the following year's edition. Recommendations are issued to every member state and are intended to identify concrete follow-up without prescribing a uniform constitutional or institutional model.

In 2024, Albania, Montenegro, North Macedonia and Serbia were included in the reporting exercise for the first time. They participate in the preparation process and, from 2024, attend the network of national contact points as observers. Recommendations for those countries continue to be issued through the Commission's enlargement process rather than through the Rule of Law Report.

The 2025 cycle added a stronger focus on the relationship between the rule of law and the European single market, including the effect of judicial efficiency, regulatory stability, corruption and the independence of regulatory authorities on businesses. The single-market dimension was incorporated across the mechanism's existing subject areas rather than becoming a separate pillar. In July 2026, the Council reaffirmed its annual rule-of-law dialogue as a preventive instrument and agreed to strengthen its structure and increase the frequency of country-specific discussions.

== Structure and operation ==
=== Annual cycle ===
The mechanism operates as a recurring cycle of information gathering, assessment, publication and follow-up. The Commission describes the Rule of Law Report as the foundation of the process. Preparation normally begins with a questionnaire sent to member states and a targeted consultation for civil society organisations, professional associations, academic institutions, businesses and other stakeholders. Commission officials subsequently conduct country visits involving national authorities, courts, prosecution services, independent bodies, journalists and civil society organisations.

Draft country chapters are sent to national authorities for factual comment before publication, although the assessment and recommendations remain the responsibility of the Commission. Following publication, the report is discussed at EU and national level, implementation of recommendations is monitored and the findings feed into the following year's assessment.

The annual cycle is not established as a formal hierarchy in which publication of a negative assessment automatically activates another EU procedure. Decisions to use infringement proceedings, Article 7 or financial instruments require separate legal and political assessments under their respective rules.

=== Rule of Law Report ===
The Rule of Law Report is the mechanism's central monitoring document. It contains a horizontal communication identifying common developments across the EU and a separate chapter for every country covered. The assessment is organised under four pillars:

- the independence, quality and efficiency of justice systems;
- the anti-corruption framework;
- media pluralism and freedom; and
- institutional checks and balances.

The report does not calculate an aggregate score or rank countries. Country chapters focus on significant developments rather than providing an exhaustive account of every rule-of-law issue. Since 2022, chapters for member states have contained recommendations, and later editions classify progress in implementing earlier recommendations as no progress, limited progress, some progress, significant progress or full implementation.

=== Network of national contact points ===
The national contact-point network consists of representatives appointed by the member states. Contact points coordinate national contributions, facilitate communication between the Commission and national authorities, discuss the methodology and are consulted on the annual questionnaire. The network also serves as a forum for exchanges of information and institutional practice.

The contact points do not approve the Commission's findings or recommendations. National authorities may provide explanations, corrections and additional information, while the Commission retains responsibility for the final report. The four participating enlargement countries attend the network as observers.

=== Interinstitutional and national dialogue ===
The Commission presents the annual report to the European Parliament and the Council. Since 2021, Parliament has debated each edition and adopted an own-initiative resolution assessing the Commission's analysis and proposing changes to the mechanism. Although the institutions have not concluded the interinstitutional agreement proposed by Parliament, the recurring reports and parliamentary resolutions have created what the European Parliamentary Research Service described as an informal rule-of-law cycle.

The Council's annual rule-of-law dialogue was established in 2014 and therefore predates the Commission mechanism. Since 2020, it has used the annual report as a principal source and has been divided into horizontal discussions on general EU trends and country-specific discussions concerning individual member states. The discussions are intended to permit exchanges of views and good practices while treating member states on an equal basis.

At national level, the Commission and the European Union Agency for Fundamental Rights developed national rule-of-law dialogues, usually hosted by Commission representations. These meetings bring national authorities and stakeholders together to discuss findings and recommendations and are intended in particular to increase the participation of civil society in follow-up.

== Scope and sources ==
The mechanism applies the same broad thematic structure to every member state, while the subjects discussed in individual country chapters vary according to national developments. The Commission assesses both improvements and deficiencies. Its methodology states that the mechanism is preventive, seeks to deepen dialogue and joint awareness, and does not aim to impose a single model for organising national justice systems or constitutional institutions.

The Commission uses information from:

- member-state governments and public authorities;
- courts, prosecution services and independent national institutions;
- civil society, professional organisations, media organisations, academic institutions and businesses;
- the EU Justice Scoreboard, Eurobarometer surveys and other Commission material;
- the Court of Justice of the European Union and the European Court of Human Rights;
- the Council of Europe, including the Venice Commission, the Group of States against Corruption and the European Commission for the Efficiency of Justice;
- the Organization for Security and Co-operation in Europe, the Organisation for Economic Co-operation and Development and the United Nations; and
- European judicial, prosecutorial, regulatory and professional networks.

The assessment is primarily qualitative. Quantitative indicators are used where available, but differences between national institutions, statistics and legal classifications limit direct comparison. The Commission states that individual indicators must be interpreted together and in their national context.

== Relationship with other EU rule-of-law instruments ==
The European Rule of Law Mechanism forms part of a broader collection of EU instruments often described as the rule-of-law toolbox. These instruments may operate in parallel but have different objectives, legal bases and thresholds.

The mechanism is distinct from:

- the Commission's 2014 Rule of Law Framework, which is a case-specific process addressing a systemic threat in an individual member state;
- infringement proceedings, which concern breaches of enforceable EU law and may result in judgments and financial penalties;
- Article 7, which permits the Council and European Council to determine risks or serious and persistent breaches of the values in Article 2 of the Treaty on European Union;
- the Rule of Law Conditionality Regulation, which permits measures protecting the EU budget where rule-of-law breaches affect or seriously risk affecting its sound financial management or the Union's financial interests;
- conditions and milestones attached to the Recovery and Resilience Facility and other EU funds; and
- the European Semester, which can include justice and anti-corruption reforms in economic-policy recommendations.

Information collected through the mechanism may contribute to the factual basis for these procedures, but a finding or recommendation in the Rule of Law Report does not itself satisfy their legal conditions. In particular, the report does not normally determine whether a rule-of-law problem has a sufficiently direct effect on the EU budget for application of the Conditionality Regulation.

The mechanism also draws on the EU Justice Scoreboard, which supplies comparative data on the efficiency, quality and independence of national justice systems. After the Commission ended the Mechanism for Cooperation and Verification for Bulgaria and Romania in 2023, both countries continued to be monitored under the horizontal annual process applicable to all member states.

== Results and impact ==
The mechanism has made assessment of the rule of law a recurring part of EU governance covering every member state rather than an exercise directed only at states already subject to formal proceedings. It has produced a common annual record of developments, regularised contacts between the Commission and national authorities and created repeated opportunities for discussion in the Council, European Parliament and national institutions.

The introduction of recommendations in 2022 gave the Commission a basis for assessing national follow-up. In the 2023 report, 11 per cent of the previous year's recommendations were assessed as fully implemented, 55 per cent as partially implemented and 34 per cent as showing no progress. The Commission reported in 2025 that 57 per cent of the recommendations issued in 2024 had been at least partially implemented, although implementation varied substantially between countries and subject areas.

The reports and recommendations have also contributed information to debates concerning EU funding and enforcement. The anti-corruption and judicial findings may be relevant to the Conditionality Regulation, recovery-plan milestones and cohesion-fund conditions, but resulting financial decisions are taken under those separate instruments. The Commission's monitoring of Poland continued after closure of the Article 7(1) procedure in 2024, while findings concerning Hungary formed part of the broader institutional record surrounding separate conditionality and recovery-fund procedures.

The mechanism has had a broader agenda-setting effect by placing national developments concerning judicial independence, corruption, media freedom and checks and balances on a common annual EU timetable. An analysis of its anti-corruption pillar found that the report had become an important basis for the Commission's anti-corruption work and could support other processes, including recovery plans and budgetary conditionality.

== Reception and criticism ==
=== European Parliament ===
The European Parliament has supported annual and equal monitoring of all member states but has maintained that the Commission mechanism is narrower and less binding than the system Parliament proposed. In October 2020, Parliament called for a legally binding and comprehensive mechanism covering democracy, the rule of law and fundamental rights, involving independent experts and applying to EU institutions as well as member states. It sought clearer links between annual recommendations and corrective tools, including Article 7, infringement proceedings and budgetary conditionality.

No interinstitutional agreement establishing Parliament's proposed democracy, rule-of-law and fundamental-rights cycle had been concluded by 2025. The European Parliamentary Research Service concluded that the Commission's annual report mechanism partly fulfilled Parliament's demands but remained an informal cycle based on recurring institutional practice rather than the comprehensive pact Parliament had requested.

Parliament has also criticised insufficient differentiation between isolated deficiencies and deliberate or systemic backsliding, recommendations it regarded as too general, and the absence of a dedicated fundamental-rights pillar. It has repeatedly called for stronger follow-up and more direct connections between persistent non-compliance and the use of enforcement or financial instruments.

=== Methodological and institutional criticism ===
A 2024 review by the European Court of Auditors described the report as a systematic preventive tool but identified challenges concerning the transparency of the methodology, the selection and weighting of evidence, consistency between country chapters, the number and precision of recommendations, and presentation of the relationship between the report and other rule-of-law instruments. It also identified the implementation rate of recommendations as a continuing challenge.

Legal scholar Barbara Grabowska-Moroz characterised the annual report as a soft instrument and summarised criticism that its language was excessively cautious, that some assessments lacked sufficient context and that it did not provide remedies for the problems identified. Pech and Bárd similarly argued that a monitoring process without sufficiently strong and timely enforcement could not by itself reverse deliberate rule-of-law backsliding.

The Commission has defended the mechanism's preventive character and opposed making publication of the report automatically trigger legal or financial measures. It has argued that separate instruments have distinct purposes and legal requirements and that expanding the report into an assessment of every aspect of democracy and fundamental rights could duplicate other EU monitoring processes.

== See also ==
- Article 7 of the Treaty on European Union
- EU Justice Scoreboard
- Mechanism for Cooperation and Verification
- Rule of Law Conditionality Regulation
- Rule of Law Report
- Rule of law
- European Semester
