= Rule of Law Conditionality Regulation =

Regulation of the European Union and Euratom

Regulation (EU, Euratom) 2020/2092
- European Union regulation
- Title: Regulation on a general regime of conditionality for the protection of the Union budget
- Made by: European Parliament and Council of the European Union
- Made under: Art. 106 Euratom Treaty (TEAEC) and art. 322 TFEU
- Journal reference: OJ L 433I, 22.12.2020, p. 1–10

History
- Date made: 16 December 2020
- Entry into force: 1 January 2021

Preparative texts
- Commission proposal: COM/2018/324

The Rule of Law Conditionality Regulation is a regulation of the European Union and Euratom, which allows the European Commission to adopt measures, including the suspension of payment of funds from the EU budget, to member states which violate the principles of rule of law enshrined in article 2 of the Treaty on European Union.

== Legislative background ==
Democratic backsliding in Hungary and Poland has been a major concern for the European Union since the 2010s. In December 2017, the European Commission initiated article 7 suspension proceedings against Poland, and in September 2018, the European Parliament did the same against Hungary. The proceedings have since stalled, however, as a suspension of a member state under Article 7 requires unanimity, excluding the member state concerned, and Hungary and Poland are widely expected to veto each other's suspension.

As a solution to this problem, the European Commission proposed in May 2018 to link disbursements from the European Union's budget to adherence to rule of law standards by means of a regulation. The European Parliament adopted a position on the Commission's proposal in April 2019, but the Council was generally wary of confronting its members from Poland and Hungary.

This changed during the adoption of the 2021–2027 Multiannual Financial Framework (MFF) and the Next Generation EU (NGEU) recovery package in the summer of 2020. At the July 2020 European Council summit, the heads of state and government of the EU member states agreed that these funds should be tied to a conditionality regime regarding the rule of law. Germany, holding the presidency of the Council, suggested a compromise on the rule of law conditionality regulation proposed by the Commission and European Parliament in September 2020. After trilogue meetings between the Council, the European Parliament, and the Commission, a legislative draft of the regulation was published on 5 November 2020.

Although the regulation could be adopted by the Council by a qualified majority, Hungary and Poland threatened to veto the Own Resources Decision, which defines how the MFF and NGEU are financed. At the European Council summit of 10 and 11 December 2020, the impasse was resolved by adopting a series of declarations on how the Rule of Law Conditionality Regulation should be adopted, implemented and interpreted. This paved the way for the adoption of the regulation by the Council on 14 December 2020 and by the European Parliament on 16 December 2020.

== Legislation ==
=== On the legal basis ===
According to Article 2 of the Treaty on European Union, the Union is founded on the respect for the rule of law, among other values, such as human dignity, freedom, democracy, equality, and respect for human rights and rights to belonging to minorities. To facilitate the attainment of these EU democratic values, Article 4 of TEU stipulates that the Union and Member States should assist each other "pursuant to the principle of sincere cooperation" and "refrain from measures that could jeopardize" the realization of the Union's values.

Article 7 of TEU acts as a remedy in a situation where there exists a serious breach of the Article 2 fundamental values in a Member State, where the European Union could go beyond its conferred competences to bring the Member State back to compliance. On the other hand, the Rule of Law Conditionality Regulation has Article 322(1)(a) of the Treaty on the Functioning of the European Union (TFEU) as its legal basis:

The European Parliament and the Council, acting in accordance with the ordinary legislative procedure, and after consulting the Court of Auditors, shall adopt by means of regulations:

(a) the financial rules which determine in particular the procedure to be adopted for establishing and implementing the budget and for presenting and auditing accounts;

— Treaty on the Functioning of the European Union

Therefore, the legitimate aim to establish a connection between the EU funds and financial interests on the one hand, and the sound rule of law in Member States, on the other hand, is solely to ensure for the proper implementation and protection of the EU budget, along with a transparent financial management.

=== The Rule of Law Regulation's text ===
Article 2 of the Regulation defines "rule of law" in light of Article 2 of TEU, and expands its definition by adding different layers that relate to different branches of government. For a democratic society in general, respect for the rule of law requires "a transparent, accountable, democratic, and pluralistic law-making process", in addition to "legal certainty" and "separation of powers". This aspect ensures checks-and-balances and does not allow for the concentration of power in a single entity. Particularly for the executive branch that possesses direct decision-making influence, rule of law denotes "prohibition of arbitrariness", so as to prevent partiality and corruption. For the judiciary, it requires "effective judicial protection, including access to justice, by independent and impartial courts, also as regards fundamental rights; separation of powers; and non-discrimination and equality before the law". An effective and independent justice system is not only an important balance to the power of other branches of government, but it also safeguards individual freedom and rights.

Article 3 describes the breaches of the rule of law that could be indicative in enforcing this regulation so as to protect the Budget, while Article 4 proceeds to elaborate on eight conditions that should be fulfilled through which a serious risk or an effective breach of the rule of law could be determined.

Article 5 lists all of the measures that could be employed for protecting the Union's budget, Article 6 explains the procedure once any of the Article 4 conditions might have been fulfilled by a Member State. Lastly, Article 7 of the Regulation describes the measures for lifting the measures against a Member State.

== Implementation ==
The declaratory statements adopted at the European Council summit of 10 and 11 December 2020 address how the European Council views the regulation should be implemented. The legal value of these declaratory statements is disputed.

According to the European Council's declaratory statements, the Commission should not only develop guidelines for the application of the regulation, but also await the outcome of legal challenges to the regulation before implementing it. Furthermore, the Commission should only apply the regulation when there are no more efficient means to protect the Union's budget.

The European Parliament adopted a resolution on 25 March 2021 in which it stressed "that the application of the Rule of Law Conditionality Regulation cannot be subject to the adoption of guidelines", urging "the Commission to avoid any further delay in its application" and "to keep Parliament regularly informed about all ongoing investigations into breaches of the principles of the rule of law which could affect, or seriously risk affecting, the sound financial management of the Union budget in a sufficiently direct way". The European Parliament threatened to take legal action against the Commission if it would not provide such information to the European Parliament by 1 June 2021.

On 10 June 2021, after the deadline had passed without the Commission providing the European Parliament with the necessary information, the European Parliament adopted another resolution, calling on the Commission to fulfil its obligations under the Rule of Law Conditionality Regulation within two weeks, and notifying the Commission that it would start preparations for legal action against the Commission for failure to act (article 265 TFEU). The European Commission rejected the ultimatum on 23 August 2021 with a five-page letter.

== Legal challenges and the Court of Justice ==
On 11 March 2021, Hungary and Poland separately launched legal proceedings with the European Court of Justice against the European Parliament and the Council for adopting the regulation, asking the court to annul the regulation as, according to Hungary and Poland, the regulation does not have an appropriate legal basis and that it serves to circumvent the punitive mechanism built in the Article 7 of the Treaty on European Union.

During the procedure, both Hungary and Poland made use of a confidential opinion of the Council of the European Union's Legal Service, however, despite the objections brought by the Council's representatives, the Court allowed this document due to "the overriding public interest in the transparency of the legislative procedure".

=== The Advocate General's Opinion ===
On 2 December 2021, the Advocate General, Campos Sánchez-Bordona issued the Opinion for the cases C-156/21 brought by Hungary and C-157/21 brought by Poland against the Parliament and the Council. The Advocate General wrote in his Opinion that since the goal was proper management of the Union's budget and not protecting rule of law as a sanction mechanism, Article 322(1)(a) TFEU is an appropriate legal basis for achieving this goal:

"...the Regulation is not intended to protect the rule of law by means of a sanction mechanism similar to Article 7 TEU, but rather to establish a financial conditionality instrument to safeguard that value of the European Union..."

"...the Regulation requires a sufficiently direct link between the breach of the rule of law and the implementation of the budget, with the result that it does not apply to all breaches of the rule of law, but only those that are directly linked to the implementation of the Union budget..."

— AG Campos Sánchez-Bordona, Press Release No 217/21

In addition, the Advocate General underlined that the existence of Article 7 TEU does not disable the EU from using additional instruments to safeguard the Union's values than the ones stipulated in Article 7 TEU, only to the extent that they differ from the mechanisms established within this article. Therefore, the Conditionality Regulation establishes this difference since there needs to be the existence of a direct link between the rule of law and sound financial management by a Member State with the goal of safeguarding the Union's budget.

Lastly, the Advocate General claims that although rule of law is mentioned as one of the Union's values in Article 2 TEU, this does not stop the legislator from defining and specifying this concept more precisely (focusing on Article 2 of the Regulation). He finishes by denoting that the definitions of rule of law within the Regulation and other specificities regarding the conditions for breaching the rule of law "satisfies the minimum requirements for clarity, precision and foreseeability required by the principle of legal certainty".

=== The Court of Justice of the European Union's Judgment ===
The ECJ ultimately dismissed both countries complaints, found that the Regulation has an appropriate legal basis, and noted that the Union did not exceed its competences conferred on itself by the Treaties.

"The values contained in Article 2 TEU have been identified and are shared by the Member States. They define the very identity of the European Union as a common legal order. Thus, the European Union must be able to defend those values, within the limits of its powers as laid down by the Treaties..."

— Court of Justice of the European Union, para 127

Additionally, the Court underlined the "mutual trust" that needs to exist between the Union and the Member States, and the realization that the Member States must comply with the values outlined in Article 2 TEU in order to derive full legal benefits of their EU membership (para 126). In a case where a member state does not comply with the aforementioned values, the Court rejects the procedure under Article 7 TEU is the only one through which "the value of the rule of law can be protected by the EU" (para 163). Nevertheless, referring to the specific Regulation, the Court establishes the direct link mechanism:

"...it is sufficient to point out that the contested regulation authorises neither the Commission nor the Council to carry out such a review other than in respect of conduct of an authority of a Member State or a situation attributable to such an authority which relates to the implementation of the Union budget and which, therefore, falls within the scope of EU law."

— Court of Justice of the European Union, para 164

== Usage against Hungary ==
On 27 April 2022, the European Commission triggered the mechanism for the first time against Hungary. On 18 September 2022, the Commission proposed to the Council to take budget protection measures against Hungary amounting to EUR 7.5 billion for its breaches of the rule of law. Hungary took remedial measures in an attempt to change the Commission's mind, but the Commission concluded on 30 November 2022 that shortcomings remained. The position of the Commission was reconfirmed on 9 December 2022, and the Committee of Permanent Representatives decided on 12 December by qualified majority to recommend to the Council to adopt an implementing decision against Hungary. The Council adopted an implementing decision on Hungary by qualified majority on 15 December 2022, freezing EUR 6.3 billion of the funds Hungary receives from the Union.

== See also ==
- Coercion (international relations)
- European Union sanctions
