= Common Market Law Review =

- Discipline: European law
- Language: English
- Edited by: Thomas Ackermann (Munich); Loïc Azoulai (Sciences Po); Marise Cremona (EUI, Florence); Michael Dougan (Liverpool); Christophe Hillion (Oslo); Giorgio Monti (EUI and Tilburg); Niamh Nic Shuibhne (Edinburgh); Ben Smulders (European Commission, Brussels); Stefaan van den Bogaert (Leiden). Associate Editor is Alison McDonnell (Leiden).

Publication details
- History: 1963-present
- Publisher: Wolters Kluwer Law and Business (Netherlands)
- Frequency: Bimonthly
- Impact factor: 1.881 (2014)

Standard abbreviations
- Bluebook: Common Mkt. L. Rev.
- ISO 4: Common Mark. Law Rev.

Indexing
- CODEN: CMLRDD
- ISSN: 0165-0750
- LCCN: 97660535
- OCLC no.: 2133371

Links
- Journal homepage; Online access

The Common Market Law Review is a bi-monthly, peer-reviewed law journal covering European Union law. It is the oldest dedicated journal on EU (originally EEC) law, founded in 1963 by the Europa Institute of Leiden University in cooperation with the British Institute of International and Comparative Law, London. It is published by Kluwer Law International. The journal publishes articles, case notes and book reviews in English.

Topics covered include: • External relations of the EU • European Union Law in national courts • Developments in market regulation • Enforcement of EU law • European consumer protection • European rules on conflict of law and conflict of jurisdictions • General principles of EU law • Regulation of public procurement • State aid policy and practice • Economic and monetary union • The EU/WTO relationship • The reaction to the financial markets crisis.

The journal also contains annotations of cases from the European Court of Justice, as well as relevant cases from national courts, the World Trade Organization, the European Court of Human Rights, and other tribunals addressing EU law, as well as book reviews from the field.
