= Cooperation and Verification Mechanism =

EU system for commitment compliance

The Cooperation and Verification Mechanism (CVM) was a safeguard measure invoked by the European Commission when a new member or acceding state of the European Union failed to implement commitments undertaken in the context of the accession negotiations in the fields of the Area of freedom, security and justice or internal market policy. The Commission formally closed the mechanism for Bulgaria and Romania on 15 September 2023. Rule-of-law developments in both countries have since been monitored through the EU's annual Rule of Law Cycle, on the same basis as in the other member states.

== Background ==
Common practice in the EU is that during accession negotiations there are agreed some temporary transitional periods after accession of new states for derogation of application for specific parts of the acquis communautaire, because of difficulties either for the new member state (like environmental regulations for large combustion plants) or for the old member states (like free movement of workers). Such temporary transitional periods in regard to particular member states are also implemented when various new pieces of EU legislation are adopted (or in a new treaty adoption or amendment).

In some cases the derogation is not temporary but permanent. Such derogations can be either major opt-outs in the European Union (formulated in a treaty) or minor derogations like the exemption of Sweden from the snus ban (formulated in EU legislation).

Both opt-outs and CVMs suspend the application of relevant provisions of EU law in regard to particular member states, but in contrast to opt-outs, which are established on the initiative of the states concerned, CVMs are established on the initiative of the commission.

In contrast to temporary derogations, which are automatically discontinued after the end of the transitional period, the Cooperation and Verification Mechanism is permanent, and its discontinuation is conditional only on the positive assessment of the fulfilment of benchmarks in the regular monitoring reports issued by the European Commission. That is similar to the permanent derogations on Eurozone and Schengen Area for new member states (formulated in accession treaties), whose discontinuation is also conditional on fulfilling benchmarks (like the convergence criteria), which are similarly assessed in regular progress reports. According to the treaties, new member states are obliged to fulfill the benchmarks for discontinuation of both permanent derogations and CVMs, but some of them deliberately delay those processes. The CVM is thus different from the Enhanced co-operation mechanism in which all EU members are generally free to opt in at any time into an already-established enhanced co-operation initiative, without preconditions.

== Legal base ==
The accession treaties include provisions such as:

If [the acceding state] has failed to implement commitments undertaken in the context of the accession negotiations, causing a serious breach of the functioning of the internal market, ..., the Commission may, until the end of a period of up to three years after accession, ..., take appropriate measures. ... The safeguard clause may be invoked even before accession ... The measures ... shall be lifted when the relevant commitment is implemented. They may however be applied beyond the period [of three years after accession] as long as the relevant commitments have not been fulfilled.

— Act of Accession of Bulgaria and Romania, Article 37

If there are serious shortcomings ... in [the acceding state] in the transposition [of Acquis communautaire] relating to mutual recognition in the area of criminal law ...and ... civil matters ..., the Commission may, until the end of a period of up to three years after accession, ..., take appropriate measures. ... These measures may take the form of temporary suspension of the application of relevant provisions ... in the relations between the acceding state and any other Member State ... The safeguard clause may be invoked even before accession ... The measures ... shall be lifted when the shortcomings are remedied. They may however be applied beyond the period [of three years after accession] as long as these shortcomings persist.

— Act of Accession of Bulgaria and Romania, Article 38

== Implementation ==
The internal market safeguard clause has not been invoked so far. The safeguard clause for criminal law and civil matters was invoked for the first time in regard to the countries of the 2007 enlargement.

On 13 December 2006 the commission established the following mechanisms for cooperation and verification of progress:

- for Romania to address specific benchmarks in the areas of judicial reform and the fight against corruption
- for Bulgaria to address specific benchmarks in the areas of judicial reform and the fight against corruption and organised crime

These measures entered into force as of the first day of accession, 1.1.2007.

The Commission assessed that "When they joined the EU on 1 January 2007, Romania and Bulgaria still had progress to make in the fields of judicial reform, corruption and organised crime. To smooth the entry of both countries and at the same time safeguard the workings of its policies and institutions, the EU decided to establish a special "cooperation and verification mechanism" to help them address these outstanding shortcomings."

No further safeguards were invoked in the three year transition period specified in the accession protocols following the 2007 enlargement to Bulgaria and Romania.

The Commission issues reports under the Cooperation and Verification Mechanism every 6 months on progress with judicial reform, the fight against corruption and, concerning Bulgaria, the fight against organised crime.

So far, no suspensions are enforced, but the possibility for those is stated in paragraph 7 of the decisions for CVM establishment from 2006.

=== Benchmarks for Romania ===
1. Ensure a more transparent, and efficient judicial process notably by enhancing the capacity and accountability of the Superior Council of Magistracy. Report and monitor the impact of the new civil and penal procedures codes.
2. Establish, as foreseen, an integrity agency with responsibilities for verifying assets, incompatibilities and potential conflicts of interest, and for issuing mandatory decisions on the basis of which dissuasive sanctions can be taken.
3. Building on progress already made, continue to conduct professional, non-partisan investigations into allegations of high-level corruption.
4. Take further measures to prevent and fight against corruption, in particular within the local government.

=== Benchmarks for Bulgaria ===
1. Adopt constitutional amendments removing any ambiguity regarding the independence and accountability of the judicial system.
2. Ensure a more transparent and efficient judicial process by adopting and implementing a new judicial system act and the new civil procedure code. Report on the impact of these new laws and of the penal and administrative procedure codes, notably on the pre-trial phase.
3. Continue the reform of the judiciary in order to enhance professionalism, accountability and efficiency. Evaluate the impact of this reform and publish the results annually.
4. Conduct and report on professional, non-partisan investigations into allegations of high-level corruption. Report on internal inspections of public institutions and on the publication of assets of high-level officials.
5. Take further measures to prevent and fight corruption, in particular at the borders and within local government.
6. Implement a strategy to fight organised crime, focussing on serious crime, money laundering as well as on the systematic confiscation of assets of criminals. Report on new and ongoing investigations, indictments and convictions in these areas.

== Table ==
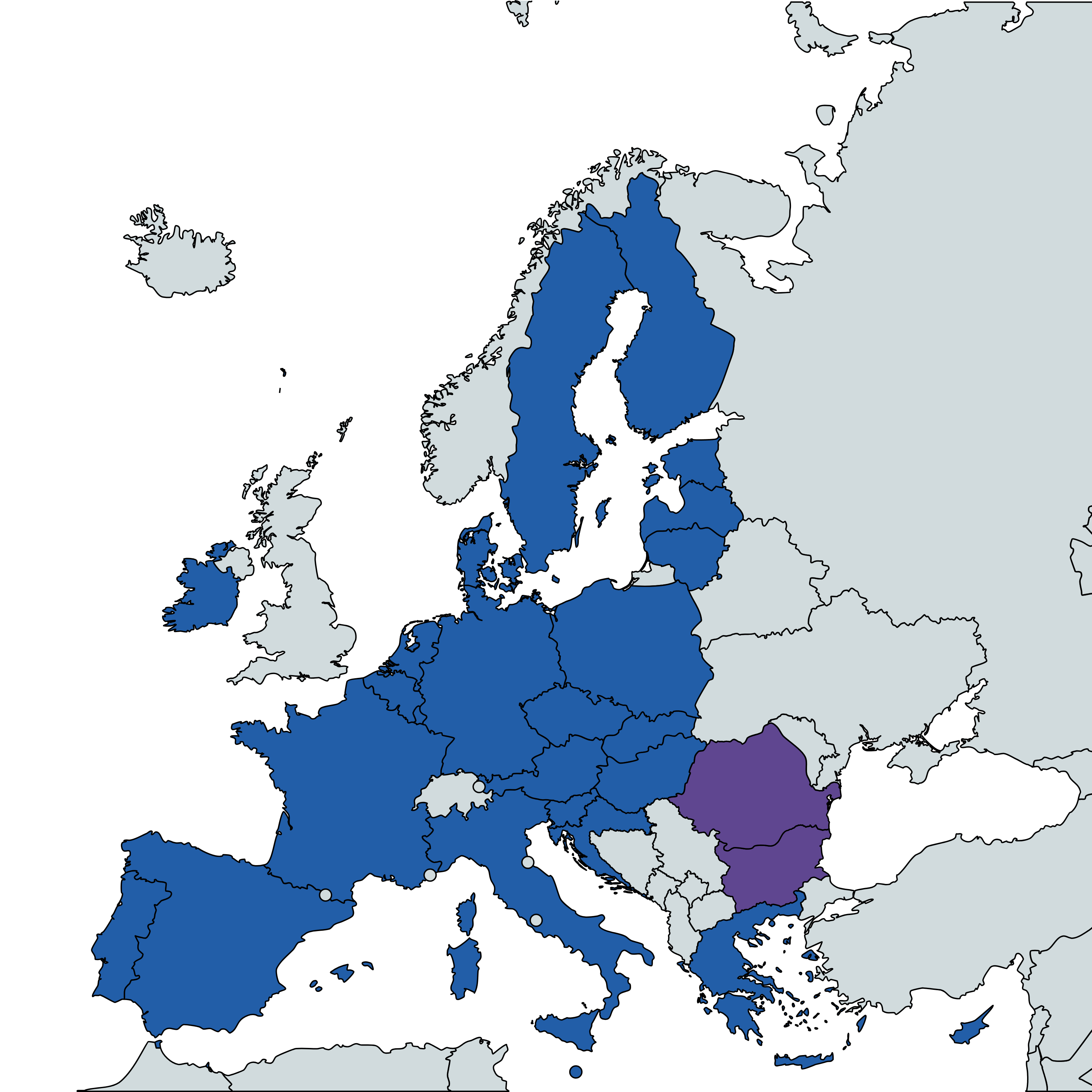
EU member states that have had at least one CVM suspension in the past EU member states that have never been suspended in regards to CVM

country	permanent acquis suspension conditional on benchmarks to be met by member state		
country	European single market	Criminal law mutual recognition	Civil matters mutual recognition
Bulgaria	Safeguards not invoked	Safeguards formerly invoked	Safeguards formerly invoked
Romania	Safeguards not invoked	Safeguards formerly invoked	Safeguards formerly invoked

— Safeguards not invoked
— Safeguards formerly invoked
— Safeguards invoked

== Developments ==
=== Bulgaria ===
In October 2019, the European Commission requested the lifting of CVM for Bulgaria, meaning that the Commission will no longer monitor or report on Bulgaria under CVM but via the annual Rule of Law Report, as for all other EU member states. However, final decision is pending with review from the European Council. In September 2021, after the United States sanctioned three Bulgarians with mafia links under the Magnitsky Act, EU Commissioner for Home Affairs Ylva Johansson admitted in a European Parliament session that "EU has not done its job" if corruption continues to erode rule of law in Bulgaria.

=== Romania ===
In November 2022, the European Commission requested the lifting of CVM for Romania, meaning that the Commission will no longer monitor or report on Romania under CVM but via the annual Rule of Law Report, as for all other EU member states. However, final decision is pending with review from the European Council.

=== Closure ===
In July 2023, European Commission Vice President Věra Jourová stated that the Commission is sending a letter to the Council and the European Parliament intending to close CVM for Bulgaria and Romania, expecting the Council to "make observations by 25 August." On 15 September 2023, the European Commission formally closed the Cooperation and Verification Mechanism (CVM) for Bulgaria and Romania. Much of the ongoing monitoring will be continued under the EU's annual Rule of Law Cycle, which applies to all EU member states.

== Subsequent accessions ==
Following the introduction of a new Rule of Law mechanism in 2019, which monitors all EU member states, the European Commission decided not to use CVM for future states which join the EU. Instead, new members are required to meet EU standards prior to joining.

Croatia acceded to the European Union on 1 July 2013, but no safeguard clauses were invoked for it.

== See also ==
- Enhanced co-operation
- Multi-speed Europe
- European integration
