= Article 7 of the Treaty on European Union =

Suspension procedure

Article 7 of the Treaty on European Union is a procedure in the treaties of the European Union (EU) to suspend certain rights from a member state. While rights can be suspended, there is no mechanism to expel a state from the union.

The procedure is covered by TEU Article 7. It would be enacted where fellow members identify another member as persistently breaching the EU's founding values (respect for human dignity, freedom, democracy, equality, the rule of law and respect for human rights, including the rights of persons belonging to minorities), as outlined in TEU Article 2.

The European Council can vote to suspend any rights of membership, such as voting and representation as outlined above. Identifying the breach requires unanimity (excluding the state concerned), (Note: The country concerned is excluded from the voting as defined in the Article 354.) but sanctions require only a qualified majority and the approval of a two-thirds majority of the European Parliament. The Council acting by majority may alter or lift such sanctions. The state in question would still be bound by the obligations of the treaties.

== Background ==
Article 7

1. On a reasoned proposal by one third of the Member States, by the European Parliament or by the European Commission, the Council, acting by a majority of four fifths of its members after obtaining the consent of the European Parliament, may determine that there is a clear risk of a serious breach by a Member State of the values referred to in Article 2. Before making such a determination, the Council shall hear the Member State in question and may address recommendations to it, acting in accordance with the same procedure.
  The Council shall regularly verify that the grounds on which such a determination was made continue to apply.
2. The European Council, acting by unanimity on a proposal by one third of the Member States or by the Commission and after obtaining the consent of the European Parliament, may determine the existence of a serious and persistent breach by a Member State of the values referred to in Article 2, after inviting the Member State in question to submit its observations.
3. Where a determination under paragraph 2 has been made, the Council, acting by a qualified majority, may decide to suspend certain of the rights deriving from the application of the Treaties to the Member State in question, including the voting rights of the representative of the government of that Member State in the Council. In doing so, the Council shall take into account the possible consequences of such a suspension on the rights and obligations of natural and legal persons.
  The obligations of the Member State in question under this Treaty shall in any case continue to be binding on that State.
4. The Council, acting by a qualified majority, may decide subsequently to vary or revoke measures taken under paragraph 3 in response to changes in the situation which led to their being imposed.
5. The voting arrangements applying to the European Parliament, the European Council and the Council for the purposes of this Article are laid down in Article 354 of the Treaty on the Functioning of the European Union.

— Article 7 of the Treaty on European Union
Article 2

The Union is founded on the values of respect for human dignity, freedom, democracy, equality, the rule of law and respect for human rights, including the rights of persons belonging to minorities. These values are common to the Member States in a society in which pluralism, non-discrimination, tolerance, justice, solidarity and equality between women and men prevail.

— Article 2 of the Treaty on European Union

Following the fall of the Berlin Wall, the European Communities (following the Maastricht Treaty, the EU) began to consider enlargement to the former Eastern Bloc states. With concerns over the EU's ability to intervene where its core principles and values were violated, there was a desire to introduce some mechanism before enlargement to those states took place. This came to be via the Treaty of Amsterdam which allowed the suspension of rights of a member state which breached the EU's values under Article 2.

In early 2000, Austria formed a government which included the right-wing populist Freedom Party. Invoking Article 7 was deemed excessive, so other member states threatened to cut off diplomatic contacts instead. This event led to a desire for an intermediate step to provide a warning sign without full suspension.

The Treaty of Nice provided this (in Article 7.1) whereby the Council, acting by majority, may identify a potential breach and make recommendations to the state to rectify it before action is taken against it as outlined above. In 2014 the European Commission introduced a three step mechanism to identify "systemic threats" to EU values. The mechanism must be complete before Article 7 is discussed.

== Process ==
Article 7.1: The mechanism begins with a proposal to find a "Clear Risk of Serious Breach" of EU values either by the Commission, the Parliament or one-third of member states. This is then approved by a two-thirds majority in the European Parliament. The accused country is then called to answer to the Council, which may then issue recommendations and vote by four-fifths to identify a breach.

Article 7.2: In the event of a "serious and persistent breach" (i.e. the country does not heed the Council's guidance) then the Commission or one-third of countries, approved by a two-thirds majority in Parliament, calls the country to answer to the European Council again. The European Council must then decide unanimously to proceed to Article 7.3.

Article 7.3: Once the European Council has unanimously decided that the breach is still occurring, the Council then votes by qualified majority to suspend rights of the accused country, including voting rights within the Council, until all duties are fulfilled.

== Usage ==
In its early history, from about 2000 to 2012, the possibility of activating Article 7 was debated but official recommendations were not made. Events for which activation of Article 7 was debated include the aforementioned Austrian coalition with the far right in 2000, the French government expulsion of thousands of Roma in 2009 and a political struggle in Romania between Traian Băsescu and Victor Ponta in 2012.

=== Use against Hungary ===
In June 2015, the European Parliament asked the Commission to present a proposal for starting the mechanism against Hungary over rule of law concerns in the country; but in October voted down a similar proposal to begin procedures against Hungary over its treatment of migrants. At the same time, a European Citizens' Initiative called for the start of Article 7 mechanisms against Hungary.

On 12 September 2018, the European Parliament voted for action against Hungary, alleging breaches of core EU values.

UK Conservative MEPs supported the right wing Hungarian leader, Viktor Orbán, against a motion to censure him in the European Parliament. Pablo Casado, leader of Spain's People's Party, directly ordered the PP members of the European Parliament to abstain in the voting of the Sargentini report calling for triggering Article 7 proceedings against the Hungarian government of Viktor Orbán.

On 30 March 2020, in response to the coronavirus pandemic, the Hungarian Parliament approved a bill to make the state of emergency indefinite and grant the ability for Prime Minister Orbán to rule by decree. The bill also makes the deliberate distribution of "misleading information that obstructs responses to the pandemic" punishable by up to five years in prison. The bill faced opposition for containing indefinite restrictions on these powers, as well as concerns over the possibility that the "fake news" prohibition in the bill could be abused for censorship of independent media outlets. As a result, European Parliament group leaders raised concerns, in a meeting of the Conference of Presidents, about the emergency measures and a majority of groups asked Parliamentary President David Sassoli to relay their concerns in a letter to the Commission and to consider activating the Article 7 procedure. In June 2020, the Hungarian parliament voted to end the rule by decree, but this left the government more powerful than before the crisis.

Usage of Article 7 was discussed again in January 2024 when Hungary blocked unanimous EU support for Ukraine.

Freedom House ratings for European Union and surrounding states, in 2019. Free Partly free Not free

=== Use against Poland ===
From the end of 2015, the Polish government became subject to European Union criticism over its media and judiciary changes and the European Commission began action against Poland in January 2016. On 20 December 2017, the European Commission triggered Article 7 for the first time in relation to Polish judicial reforms because, in the view of the Commission, they remove the separation of powers between the executive and the judiciary. "After two years, the Commission can only conclude that there is now a clear risk of a serious breach of the rule of law", Vice President Frans Timmermans added. Any action to deprive Poland of its voting rights would require a unanimous vote of its fellow member states. As of December 2017, Hungary would be expected to exercise its veto in Poland's favour. On 29 May 2024, the European Commission formally closed the Article 7(1) procedure against Poland by withdrawing the reasoned proposal that had initiated it in 2017. The Commission concluded that there was no longer a clear risk of a serious breach of the rule of law in Poland and said that it would continue monitoring the country's measures through the annual Rule of Law Report.

== Expulsion ==
While a state can be suspended, there is no provision to expel a member state outright. The idea appeared in the drafting of the European Constitution and the Lisbon Treaty but was not included. There are a number of considerations which make such a provision impractical. Firstly, a member state leaving would require amendments to the treaties, and amendments require unanimity. Unanimity would be impossible to achieve if the state did not want to leave of its own free will. Secondly it is legally complicated, particularly with all the rights and privileges being withdrawn for both sides that would not be resolved without an orderly and voluntary withdrawal. Third, the concept of expulsion goes against the spirit of the treaties. But it is possible and there is a rule, article 50, allowing a member to expel itself, which the United Kingdom did. In this article, all treaties simply cease to apply to the member leaving, adjusted by a possible treaty with the said member. Contrary to expulsion, most available sanctions are conciliatory, not punitive; they do not punish a state for failing to live up to fellow states' demands, but encourage a state to fulfill its treaty obligations.

== See also ==
- European Union law
- Rule of Law Conditionality Regulation
- Treaty on European Union
- Withdrawal from the European Union
