= The European Semester =

Annual cycle of economic and fiscal policy coordination

The Economic and Monetary Union (EMU) Members of the Eurozone ERM II member with opt-out (Denmark) ERM II members Other EU members

The European Semester of the European Union was established in 2010 as an annual cycle of economic and fiscal policy coordination. It provides a central framework of processes within the EU socio-economic governance. The European Semester is a core component of the Economic and Monetary Union (EMU) and it annually aggregates different processes of control, surveillance and coordination of budgetary, fiscal, economic and social policies. It also offers a large space for discussions and interactions between the European institutions and Member States. As a recurrent cycle of budgetary cooperation among the EU Member States, it runs from November to June and is preceded in each country by a national semester running from July to October in which the recommendations introduced by the Commission and approved by the Council are to be adopted by national parliaments and construed into national legislation.

The European Semester has evolved over the years with a gradual inclusion of social, economic, and employment objectives and it is governed by mainly three pillars which are a combination of hard and soft law due a mix of surveillance mechanisms and possible sanctions with coordination processes.

The main objectives of the European Semester are noted as: contributing to ensuring convergence and stability in the EU; contributing to ensuring sound public finances; fostering economic growth; preventing excessive macroeconomic imbalances in the EU; and implementing the Europe 2020 strategy. However, the rate of the implementation of the recommendations adopted during the European Semester has been disappointing and has gradually declined since its initiation in 2011 which has led to an increase in the debate/criticism towards the effectiveness of the European Semester.

== History ==
The European Semester was initiated in 2010 with the aim of providing better coordination between the European Union member states regarding their fiscal and economic policies. It is embedded in the architecture of the Economic and Monetary Union of the European Union and was created after the 2008 financial crisis and the Eurozone crisis. These international economic crisis deeply affected the EU member states and demonstrated the need for an enhanced economic and fiscal governance.

Prior to 2010, the EU member states’ economic policies were coordinated separately and yet the member states’ economies were (and still are) closely interdependent under the Economic and Monetary Union. Therefore, the countries found it appropriate to coordinate their economic policy procedures under a common time-based framework as well as to facilitate and harmonize their national budgetary, growth and employment policy goals, while taking into consideration various EU set of targets. The European Semester was meant to boost and improve the national strategies towards more fiscal, economic, employment and social policy coordination. It is based on different acts as well as on actions and development plans such as the Stability and Growth Pact (SGP), the European Employment Strategy, the Lisbon Strategy that sets the basis of the Open Method of Coordination and the Horizon 2020 strategy.

The European Semester was created under the legal basis of the Six-pack and especially Regulation (EU) No 1175/2011 of the European Parliament and of the Council of 16 November 2011 amending Council Regulation (EC) No 1466/97 on the strengthening of the surveillance of budgetary positions and the surveillance and coordination of economic policies. The first Semester was initiated in 2011.

At the end of 2017, the scope of the European Semester widened with the announcement by the European Parliament, the Council and the European Commission of the implementation of a social dimension within the third pillar, through the European Pillar of Social Right.

In 2020, with the outbreak of the COVID-19 crisis, the European Semester requirements were simplified. During the 2020 round of the European Semester, the main steps basically remained the same, but in response to the high socio-economic uncertainty of the crisis, some measures were made more flexible for the Member States. As opposed to other years, the 2020 European Semester recommendations mainly focused on broad areas that were the most related to the sanitary crisis, such as investments on healthcare, preservation of employment, research and development and the preservation of the single market. Created in a context of crises, the European Semester will be adapted in 2021 in response to the COVID-19 crisis. The Recovery and Resilience Facility, as part of the NextGenerationEU (that aims at helping the EU recover from the sanitary crisis), was integrated into the European Semester framework.

== The three pillars: a mix of hard and soft law ==
The European economic governance is formed by 3 pillars that were taken over under a single overarching framework: the European Semester. Before 2010, the European economic governance consisted of 2 pillars: the budgetary surveillance since the adoption of the Stability and Growth Pact (SGP) in 1997 and the socio-economic coordination initiated by the Lisbon Strategy in the early 2000. Since the Eurozone crisis, the economic dimension of the Economic and Monetary Union (EMU) was enhanced and one additional pillar was added while the existing pillars were strengthened. The 3 Pillars that form the European Semester since the crisis include:

- The budgetary surveillance that was strengthened (in view with the legislative acts reforming the SGP);
- The macroeconomic surveillance (created by the Six Pack);
- The socioeconomic coordination (strengthened by the Euro Plus Pact that came into force on 13 December 2011);
- In some literature, there is a fourth pillar based on Financial solidarity (formed by different acts: the Two Pack, the European Stability Mechanism and the Fiscal Compact) which doesn't play a relevant role during the Semester because all the macroeconomic and budgetary processes that form its core are part of the 3 pillars.

The European Semester is a framework of processes that combines hard and soft law. Soft law refers to non-binding processes. Indeed, during the European Semester, there is a coordination between the Member States that are not legally engaged and not forced to comply with its outcomes or its targets. Nevertheless, the European Semester also has a hard law component. Within hard law, the processes of budgetary as well as macroeconomic assessments and recommendations mentioned as legally engaging States in regulations or in treaties, must be observed. That means that States can be subjected to sanctions in case of non-compliance. The first and the second pillars of the European Semester form the hard law component. The third pillar is the broader one and the more sensitive for the Member States (mainly because of its social component) and deals with soft law.

=== First pillar: Budgetary surveillance ===
This pillar under the European semester framework aims at ensuring the surveillance and preventing the apparition of budgetary imbalances. In case of imbalances, corrective measures are taken. The legislative acts and treaties under this pillar are the following:

- The Six Pack and especially Regulation (EU) n°1175/2011 of 16 November 2011 amending Council Regulation (EC) No 1466/97 on the strengthening of the surveillance of budgetary positions and the surveillance and coordination of economic policies.
- The Two Pack and especially Regulation (EU) n° 472/2013 of 21 May 2013 on the strengthening of economic and budgetary surveillance of Member States in the euro area experiencing or threatened with serious difficulties with respect to their financial stability.
- The Stability and Growth Pact formed by the conclusions of the Amsterdam European Council of 16 and 17 June 1997, Regulation n°1466/97, Regulation n°1467/97, amended by Regulation n°1177/2011 and Regulation n°1175/2011.
- The Treaty on the Functioning of the European Union (article 126) and its Protocol on the Excessive deficits (Protocol 12)
- The Fiscal Compact that states that the budgetary and the rules concerning public indebtedness should be transposed in a national law preferably of a constitutional nature.

==== Rules concerning Public Deficit ====
Article 126 of the Treaty on the functioning of the European Union prohibits excessive deficits. Besides, the protocol n°12 states 3% of the GDP as maximum. The multilateral surveillance is a part since 2011 of the European Semester. Therefore, each Member State has to give to the Commission and the Council in its stability programme all the information concerning its deficit ratio (article 3 of Regulation n°1466/97 of the Stability and Growth Pact).

The Medium-term objective (MTO) is the deficit taken in a broader period of time and that is not subjected to economic cycles effects and budgetary short-term measures. The MTO is an important parameter taken into account by the Commission during its assessment of the budgetary situation of a Member State. The MTO must lead to an equilibrium of the deficits of each Member State and is calculated as the difference between public spending and the potential GDP growth. Indeed, Regulation (EU) n°1175/2011 amending one of the two regulation constituting the Stability and Growth Pact states that the MTO shall be between -0,5% of the GDP and the equilibrium or exceeding it. All the Member states that haven't reach a certain reference rate of public spending (deficit) based on GDP growth in the medium term (unique to each Member State based on projections) have to follow a trajectory of adjustment defined by the Commission and the Council.

==== Rules concerning Public Debt ====
The maximum of 60% of indebtedness relative to the GDP of each Member State was first inserted in the Protocol on the excessive deficit procedure of the Maastricht Treaty (article 1) in order to prepare the convergence of the States towards the adoption of the Euro. Moreover, the 60% criterion was taken over in the Protocol on the procedure regarding excessive deficits attached to the Lisbon Treaty (article 1). For the multilateral surveillance, each Member State has to give to the Commission and the Council in its stability programme all the information concerning its indebtedness ratio (article 3 of Regulation n°1466/97 of the Stability and Growth Pact). Furthermore, Regulation n°472/2013 in its article 6 states that if a Member State requests financial assistance, an evaluation shall be made on the sustainability of its government debt.

==== Excessive Deficit Procedure ====
In case of an excessive deficit, a deviation from the MTO or from the adjustment path, the Commission can activate the corrective phase of the SGP and recommend during the European semester the opening of an excessive deficit procedure. The council automatically adopts the recommendation against a Eurozone Member State unless a qualified majority of the States oppose to it (reversed qualified majority) following the procedure stated in the Fiscal compact. For the Non-Euro Members, the council has to agree on the Commission's recommendation with a qualified majority of the voting.

A lot of countries such as Belgium or Italy were subjected to that procedure. (Note: A list of the details per country can be found on the website of the Commission : https://ec.europa.eu/info/business-economy-euro/economic-and-fiscal-policy-coordination/eu-economic-governance-monitoring-prevention-correction/stability-and-growth-pact/corrective-arm-excessive-deficit-procedure/excessive-deficit-procedures-overview_en) Only 2 countries have never seen an excessive deficit procedure launched against them: Estonia and Sweden.

==== Obligation to Deliver Correct Information in Time ====
All the Member States have to build their budgetary framework according precise rules detailed in Directive 2011/85 of the Six Pack. Those rules are notably related to accounting, statistics, realism in budgetary information, etc. In case of suspicion of data manipulation or wrong information, the Commission can launch an investigation in a Member State that can lead to sanctions. For example, Spain got fiscal sanctions under that procedure because of the Autonomous Community of Valencia that had misrepresented its statistics.

=== Second pillar: Macroeconomic surveillance ===
This pillar aims at monitoring and preventing the emergence of macroeconomic imbalances. In its annual Alert Mechanism Report, the Commission gives an assessment for each country on the basis of its economic and financial situation using different indicators. There are two types of indicators:

- Example of internal indicators: public and private indebtedness, unemployment level, etc.
- Example of external indicators: exchange rates, the export data of each State, etc.

The countries that are facing (or that may face) macroeconomic imbalances are subjected to an in-depth analysis that can lead to the opening of an excessive macroeconomic imbalance procedure. If a Member State has seen an excessive macroeconomic imbalance procedure launched against it, the Council will recommend measures that the States shall take and the Commission will be in charge of closely monitoring their implementation. If there is no improvement, the Commission can publish a recommendation that publicly recognizes the non-compliance with the corrective measures. This will be automatically adopted by the Council unless a qualified majority of Member States oppose to it. The Commission may also recommend to the Council the imposition of sanctions, the conditions of which are detailed in Article 4 of Regulation n°1174/2011.

In 2018, 12 countries were subjected to an in-depth review from the Commission because they faced macroeconomic imbalances: Bulgaria, Croatia, Cyprus, France, Germany, Ireland, Italy, the Netherlands, Portugal, Slovenia, Spain and Sweden.

=== Third pillar: Socio-economic coordination ===
Socio-economic coordination relates to the coordination of national and European socio-economic policies with the objective of promoting growth and jobs. The 2011 European Semester was dominated by the pursuit of fiscal consolidation and macroeconomic austerity with limited concern for social cohesion and inclusion goals.

However, as the sovereign debt crisis within the Eurozone morphed into a broader economic and employment crisis, leading to a rapid erosion of public support for the EU, a significant re-balancing between social, economic, and employment objectives has been visible in the policy orientation of successive European Semesters. In the 2017 European Commission’s reflection paper on deepening the Economic and Monetary Union, the European Commission suggested that the Semester could be further reinforced by fostering cooperation and dialogue among member states at different levels to ensure and encourage stronger domestic implementation of reforms.

== The Functioning of the European Semester ==
=== Autumn package ===
It's the most important period of the semester if we take into account the five documents that are produced: the Annual Growth Survey; the Alert Mechanism Report; the Joint Employment Report; the Commission’s recommendation for the euro area; and the Commission’s opinions on draft budgetary plans.

==== October ====
The European semester begins with the submission from the Eurozone Member States of their draft budgetary plans. This also marks the start of a dialogue between the Member States and the Commission. Before the budget of each Member State is debated in its national parliament, the Commission needs to assess it according to numerous elements such as the macroeconomic and budgetary situation of the country or the council recommendations made during former semesters.

==== November ====
The Commission usually releases the full "Autumn Package" (usually) in November. This set of documents aim to describe the overall situation of the employment, the social priorities and the economic stability inside the European Union. It also delivers overall recommendations for the Eurozone and a specific opinion on the draft budgetary plans of the Eurozone countries.

- The Annual Growth Survey (AGS):

The AGS is a communication from the Commission to the other European institutions . (Note: The Annual Growth Survey has been renamed as ‘the Annual Sustainable Growth Strategy (ASGS)’ during the 2020 European Semester.) It is a comprehensive document of the Autumn Package which analyses the most recent trends in terms of economic and social policies and establishes the general economic and social priorities for the EU. It also provides the Member States with policy guidance for the upcoming year. The Commission gives in the document an overview of the state of the European economy and looks at what has been accomplished in the past years in terms of growth, jobs and investment. It also gives the key challenge that the economy is facing which can lead to macroeconomic, financial and budgetary imbalances as well as defining long-term economic and social objectives for Europe. The annual growth survey is based on the progress towards the Europe 2020 targets, the macroeconomic report analyzing the EU economic situation and the joint employment report. The AGS priorities have evolved overtime: From 2011 to 2014, the AGS priorities focused on fiscal consolidation, tackling unemployment and the social consequences of the crisis as well as modernizing public administration. From 2015 to 2018, the focus shifted to boosting investment, pursuing structural reforms, and responsible fiscal policies. Furthermore, in 2019, the priorities stressed that policy efforts at national level should focus on delivering high-quality investment and reforms which increase productivity growth, inclusiveness and institutional capacity, while continuing to ensure macro-financial stability and sound public finances. Finally, in the 2020 Annual Sustainable Growth Strategy, there was a tremendous shift of priorities which stressed the transition towards a sustainable and inclusive economy, technological progress, sustainable solutions and demographic changes. Indeed, the 2020 Strategy has four dimensions; environmental sustainability, productivity gains, fairness and macroeconomic stability.

In 2025, the AGS report was renamed "European Macroeconomic report".

- The Alert Mechanism Report (AMR):

It is a report addressed from the Commission to other European institutions: the Council, the European Central Bank, the European Parliament and to the European Economic and social committee. This report marks the beginning of the annual cycle of the macroeconomic imbalance procedure (MIP) in identifying and addressing the risks of macroeconomic imbalances in accordance with articles 3 and 4 of Regulation (EU) No 1176/2011 on the prevention and correction of macroeconomic imbalances. Several indicators are used in order to determine the countries that need an in-depth review (IDR) because of the macroeconomic risk they face or may face.

- The Joint Employment Report (JER):

This report is mandated by article 140 of the Treaty on the functioning of the EU. This document outlines the important social and employment achievements or developments in the EU. It also gives actions that were taken by Member States in line with the Guidelines for the Employment Policies of each country. Furthermore, the States are monitored by a scoreboard of indicators set up in the European Pillar of Social Rights (Council decision 2018/1215 of 16 July 2018).

- The Recommendation on the economic policy of the euro area:

It's a draft recommendation made by the Commission in view of the Council recommendation. The document prescribes measures that the Eurozone Member States have to implement in order to tackle critical issues for the functioning of the Single currency area.

- The Opinion on draft budgetary plans of Eurozone members:

The opinion assesses the conformity of the draft budgetary plan of each Member state in line with the fiscal and budgetary rules (first pillar). It also gives an overview of the implementation of each State regarding the Country-specific recommendation (CSRs) addressed during the former European semester.

=== Winter economic forecast ===
==== December/January ====
The Council adopts the recommendations on the economic policy of the euro area on the basis of the Commission's recommendation. The Council also adopts conclusions on the Alert Mechanism Report and on the Annual Growth Survey.

During these 2 months, the national parliament of each Member State adopts its budget.

==== February ====
At the end of the month, the Commission publishes its Country reports. The reports underline for each State the economic situation and forecasts, the progress regarding the implementation of the Country-specific recommendations addressed by the Council in the previous years, the reform priorities that the country needs to endorse as well as a summary of the possible in-depth investigation launched under the AMR. Country reports also cover all areas of macroeconomic or social relevance with the aim of monitoring the progress of Member States. Countries can find in their report a detailed analysis of the challenges their economy face, as well as policy suggestions for tackling these challenges. The reports are also intended to provide the basis for a dialogue between the Member States and the European Commission under the form of bilateral meetings which follow their release. The country reports are important for States in view of the preparation of their National Reform Programmes as well as their Stability or Convergence Programmes.

=== Spring economic forecast ===
==== March ====
The European Council discusses the economic situation of the countries of the EU. It endorses the AGS and lists the broad economic priorities that need to be adopted by the member states. These guidelines allow Member States to develop their stability programs (for euro area members) or convergence programs (for non-euro area members states) and their national reform programmes.

==== April ====
Each member state sends two documents to the Commission and the Council:

- The National Reform Programme:

It gives a detailed project of economic reforms that each country will implement. It also contains all the reforms the country has taken (and will take) to address the country recommendations of the previous years or simply the reforms that the country has taken regarding its own situation. This document contains also specific policies that the country will implement in order to strengthen employment and growth. Furthermore, the programme gives an overview of the strategic investments and the use of the structural funds made by the state. The situation of the country regarding the objectives of the current framework strategy (currently Europe 2020) are also reported. The measures adopted in the National Reform Programmes should be precise and represent immediate and comprehensive budgetary consequences in relation to national objectives and targets.

- The Stability Programme (for Eurozone countries) / the Convergence Programme (for non-eurozone countries):

Each country sets in the document the orientation and the objectives of its budgetary policies for 3 years. The document should demonstrate how the country is in the path in reaching its Medium-Term Objective (MTO) and how it will prevent and correct its macroeconomic/budgetary imbalances. The stability programmes must contain macroeconomic forecasts that are provided by an independent authority and that will be reviewed and subjected to a comparison with the Commission forecasts. Any differences will have to be explained and justified. The programme contains more precisely budgetary and fiscal assumptions for 3 years such as the planned deficit, the level of indebtedness and some macroeconomic scenarios.

==== May ====
The commission publishes and sends to the Council its proposal of recommendation in view of the adoption of the Country-specific recommendations (CSRs). The documents contains policy guidelines for each country. It states the macroeconomic, fiscal and budgetary reforms that need to be taken or the way of addressing challenges. These recommendations need to be followed and implemented by the Member States. The CSRs are drafted after a thorough assessment of the progress made from the previous year's CSRs, and a detailed analysis of the National Reform Programmes and Stability or Convergence Programmes.

The initial preparation and drafting of the CSRs is done by Country Teams which are led by the Secretariat-General of the European Commission with contributions from desk officers and several responsible from relevant Directorate-Generals of the European Commission. It has to follow a deliberative and evidence-based process. At the national level, the European Commission engages European Semester Officers (ESOs) who are economic policy experts with the role of bringing the Semester closer to national stakeholders by overseeing the implementation of the CSRs, feeding the Country Teams with CSR analysis, national insights and sentiments, and sometimes explaining complex details of EU economic governance to the national stakeholders. When the draft has been formulated by the Country Teams, it is then submitted to the Director-Generals of Secretariat-General of the European Commission, Directorate-General for Economic and Financial Affairs, Directorate-General for Employment, Social Affairs and Inclusion, Directorate-General for Taxation and Customs Union for discussion and finally to the college of commissioners for approval.

=== Summer economic forecast ===
==== June / July ====
In June, the Council of the EU in its different formations such as Employment, Social Policy, Health and Consumer Affairs Council (EPSCO) and advisory bodies such as the Economic Policy Committee (EPC), the Employment Committee (EMCO), and the Social Protection Committee (SPC) discusses and debates the draft of the country-specific recommendations, which are in turn discussed and endorsed by the European Council.

Finally, in July, the Council formally adopts the country-specific recommendations, and the member states are supposed to take these recommendations into account in their national decision-making and in the next year's national budget. All CSRs adopted in the context of the European Semester since 2011 are registered in the CSR database, which is the main tool for recording and monitoring each member state's annual progress with the implementation of CSRs.

== The 2022 European Semester and Recovery and Resilience Facility ==
In response to the COVID-19 crisis, the EU adapted its socio-economic governance and decided to provide financial support to all member states in order to help them recover. In that context, as a key tool of the NextGenerationEU Plan, the Recovery and Resilience Facility emerged as a financial support for member states through loans and grants.

The European Council decided to use some of the existing EU macro-economic instruments to facilitate the implementation and the management of the Recovery and Resilience Facility, notably the EU budget but also the European Semester. Consequently, the European Semester became “the main institutional vehicle” for the Recovery and Resilience Facility, and they now encompass each other.

The Recovery and Resilience Facility requires from the member states, for the use of the financial support, plans and strategies with reforms and public investment projects. The main European Semester's tools used to integrate the Recovery and Resilience Facility are the Country Specific Recommendations and the National Reforms Programmes, facilitating the elaboration of plans in order to assess the reform trajectories. In addition, the European Semester timeline will be used to facilitate the exchange of information among the different actors along the process.

Although the use of the European Semester as the tool for the Covid-crisis Recovery plan faces criticism, it is also seen as an opportunity for the European Semester to become more effective, as this process makes the soft governance dimension of the European Semester harder.

In sum, in 2022, the European Semester is to provide its economic and employment policy scope while adapting to the Recovery and Resilience Facility. With the EU's strategy of competitive sustainability, further shifting of economic policy coordination has taken place in line with COVID-19 crisis challenges. This shift was confirmed by the Annual Sustainable Growth Survey, at the beginning of the 2021-2022 cycle.

The Commission classified the four main dimensions of the 2022 European Semester, integrating the Recovery and Resilience Facility:

1) National reform programmes and stability/convergence programmes - as usual, member states have to submit their economic and fiscal policy strategies, this time taking into account a new dimension of National Reform Programme, which includes bi-annual reporting requirements under the Recovery and Resilience facility.

2) Publication of streamline country reports - country reports will include a general overview of economic and social development and difficulties that states are facing. In addition, they will provide an analysis of their resilience.

3) Proposals for country-specific recommendations - these recommendations will highlight the important issues; and in some situations, in-depth analyses to identify the requirement of policy analyses.

4) Continued integration of the Sustainable Development Goals into the European Semester - Commission is working to integrate Sustainable Development Goals into the European Semester, and an annual SDG monitor reports will be available from all the member states. In addition, the report will include each state's progress in SDG areas.

While social targets are not precisely defined in the RRF, the Commission will, through the Semester governance, monitor the amount spent on reforms and investments focused on young people, gender and other groups, thereby taking the role of promoting the correct distribution of money to the different social groups.

== Criticism and debate ==
The economic governance structure of the European Semester has been criticized for focusing more on framing policies at the national level rather than reinforcing policies at the European level, as well as having an inclination towards executive institutions rather than legislative institutions. In his report on the European competitiveness, Mario Draghi stated that "the established processes have so far proven to be largely bureaucratic and ineffective at fostering genuine EU-wide policy coordination."

Additionally, the overlap of the governance tools has been seen as increasing the complexity of interpretation and understanding of the European Semester for both authorities and citizens at the national and European level.

It has also been criticized for primarily being based on budgetary discipline rather than adequately addressing the coordination as well as the political and economic policy integration which would favour growth and development.

The effectiveness of the European Semester has also been criticized due to the annual decline of the implementation of Country-Specific Mechanisms by the Member States.As observed by Efstathiou et al. (2018), there was a decline in the adoption and implementation of the CSRs by the member states from 2013 to 2017. Moreover, in an earlier study by Darvas et al. (2015), it was observed that there was a limited response and implementation of CSRs by the member states and an annual decline in CSRs implementation from 40% in 2011 to 29% in 2014 .

Another criticism put forward by many authors is the prioritization of economic objectives over social objectives in the European Semester. For example, Zeitlin et al. (2018) observe that many critics argue that social policy has been largely dominated by economic policy and that economic policy actors have dominated the semester process as well as the decision-making process In addition, they wrote that the legal basis of some elements of the coordination architecture means that the Semester is a hierarchical structure that Member States frequently experience as imposition from above. However, in their study, they note that although the Semester was largely driven by economic considerations when it was initiated, there has been a partial and progressive socialization of the European Semester and they stress that understanding the dynamics of the semester process and its stages of development is central to understanding its wider evolution and sense of trajectory.

Additionally, Bekker (2015) observed that the European Semester's socioeconomic coordination process was complex in nature and that the different dimensions were often difficult to disentangle thus the European Semester may be considered as both economic and social. However, she also notes that the subsuming of social policy goals into economic cycles of governance does not necessarily result in the subjugation of social policy to economic imperatives and concludes that there is still an opportunity to achieve complementary modes of coordination.

Overall, whereas it was established following the 2008 financial crisis in a context of social dissatisfaction about the measures taken, the European Semester establishes a coordination framework in which social policy coordination has gained importance during the second half of the last decade. Even though its social aspect has been criticized because it is considered overwhelmed by the economic goals, there is more and more evidence that the Semester faces a progressive socialization.

The coupling of the RRF to the Semester represents its latest development. It constitutes a new opportunity for social actors to further enter the process and seize their legitimate role, even though social players involvement remains so far mainly country-specific.
