= Gráinne de Búrca =

Irish legal scholar (born 1966)

Gráinne de Búrca, FBA (born 1966) is a highly cited Irish legal scholar, specialising in European Union law. With Paul Craig, de Búrca is the author of EU law: text, cases, and materials, a popular textbook in European Union Law; her research focuses on EU law, human rights and equality, democracy, and governance. Since 2023, she has been Chair in Constitutional Law at the European University Institute, on leave from the New York University School of Law Florence Ellinwood Allen Professorship. From 1990 to 2000, she was a lecturer at University of Oxford and a Fellow of Somerville College, Oxford. She was then Professor of Law at the European University Institute, Fordham University School of Law, and Harvard Law School, before joining New York University.

In 2023 she was elected an honorary member of the Royal Irish Academy.

== Selected works ==
- Craig, Paul; de Búrca, Gráinne, eds. (1999). The evolution of EU law (1st ed.). Oxford: Oxford University Press. ISBN 978-0198765080.
- de Búrca, Gráinne, ed. (2002). EU law and the welfare state: in search of solidarity. Oxford: Oxford University Press. ISBN 978-0199287413.
- Craig, Paul; de Búrca, Gráinne, eds. (2011). The evolution of EU law (2nd ed.). Oxford: Oxford University Press. ISBN 978-0199592968.
- de Búrca, Gráinne; Weiler, J. H. H., eds. (2011). The worlds of European constitutionalism. Cambridge: Cambridge University Press. ISBN 978-0521177757.
- Craig, Paul; de Búrca, Gráinne (2024). EU Law: Text, Cases, and Materials (8th ed.). Oxford: Oxford University Press. doi:10.1093/he/9780198915522.001.0001. ISBN 978-0198915522.
