= Deirdre Curtin =

Legal scholar

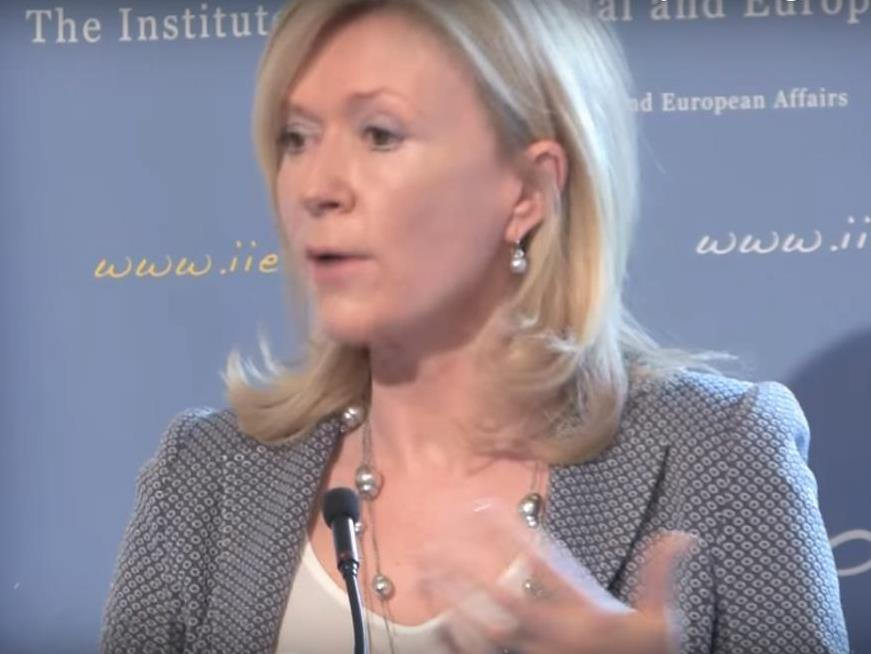
- Born: January 17, 1960 (age 66); Dublin, Ireland
- Occupations: Legal scholar, Professor

Academic background
- Education: University College Dublin; Trinity College, Dublin

Deirdre Maire Curtin (born 17 January 1960) is a legal scholar who works in the area of law and governance of the European Union. She is Professor of European Law at the European University Institute in Florence and director of its Centre for Judicial Cooperation.

== Career ==
Born in Dublin, Ireland, Curtin studied law at University College Dublin, completing her degree in 1980. After finishing her studies, Curtin joined Trinity College, Dublin as a Master's student.

In 1985, Curtin joined the Court of Justice of the European Communities as a legal secretary (référendaire) to Judge T. F. O'Higgins, a position she held until 1991. After her term at the Court, she joined Utrecht University as full professor of Law of International Organizations, moving in 2003 to the chair of International and European Governance at the Utrecht School of Governance, which she held (part-time) until 2013.

After some years at the Utrecht School of Governance, Curtin joined the University of Amsterdam in 2008 as a Professor of European Law, where she was the founding director of the Amsterdam Centre for European Law and Governance (ACELG). She left that professorship in 2015, to join the European University Institute as Professor of European Union Law, but retained her affiliation with the University of Amsterdam until 2016.

== Academic work ==
Deirdre Curtin's research deals with the law and governance of the European Union. Her publications have engaged with various aspects of European law, with a focus on matters of democracy, legitimacy and accountability.

Curtin has written extensively on phenomenon of differentiated integration, having coined the term "Europe of bits and pieces" to refer to its piecemeal development after the 1992 Maastricht Treaty. Curtin is known as a promoter of the use of empirical methods in research about European Union law.

== Awards ==
Since 2003, Curtin is member of the Royal Netherlands Academy of Arts and Sciences. She was the first woman to be appointed a member of the academy in the section law.

In 2007, she won the Spinozapremie, the first time it was awarded to a lawyer.

In May 2021, she was made a member of the Royal Irish Academy.

== Selected publications ==
=== Books ===
- Amtenbrink, D. Curtin, B. de Witte, P.J. Kuijper, A. McDonnell, S. van den Bogaert (eds.), Law of the European Union, Alphen aan den Rijn : Kluwer Law International, 2018.
- Fahey, E. and Curtin, D. (eds.), A Transatlantic Community of Law. Legal Perspectives on the Relationship between the EU and US Legal Orders, Cambridge: Cambridge University Press, 2014.
- Curtin, D., Mair, P. and Papadopoulos, I. (eds.), Accountability and European Governance, London: Routledge, 2012.
- Bovens, M., Curtin, D. and t'Hart, P. (eds.), The Real World of EU Accountability. What Deficit?, Oxford: Oxford University Press, 2010.
- Curtin, D., Executive Power in the European Union. Law, Practices and the Living Constitution, Oxford: Oxford University Press, 2009.

=== Articles ===
- Curtin, D., "Second Order Secrecy and Europe’s Legality Mosaics", West European Politics, 2018, 41(4), pp. 846–868.
- Curtin, D. & Leino-Sandberg, P., "In Search of Transparency for EU Law-Making: Trilogues on the Cusp of Dawn", Common Market Law Review, 2017, 54(6), pp. 1673–1712.
- Curtin, D., "Accountable Independence of the European Central Bank: Seeing the Logics of Transparency", European Law Journal, 2017, 23(1-2), 28–44.
- Curtin, D., "Data Privacy Rights and Democracy: Ireland, Europe and Beyond", Irish Journal of European Law, 2015, 18(2), pp. 5 – 14.
- Curtin, D., "The Challenge of Executive Democracy in Europe", Modern Law Review, 2014, 77(1), pp. 1 – 32.
- Curtin, D., Hillebrandt, M., & Meijer, A., "Transparency in the EU Council of Ministers: An Institutional Analysis", European Law Journal, 2014, 20(1), pp. 1–20.
