= Loïc Azoulai =

French scholar of European Union Law

Loïc Azoulai is a legal scholar known for his work on European Union law. Since January 2024, he holds the Chair in Law and Social Europe at the European University Institute, one of Europe's leading postgraduate institutions, on secondment from Sciences Po. In January 2025, he was appointed Director of Graduate Studies in the EUI Department of Law.

== Career ==
Azoulai studied law at the University of Nice in the 1990s, and obtained his PhD at the European University Institute in 2000 under the supervision of Joël Rideau and Renaud Dehousse. From 2003 to 2006, he worked as a legal secretary (référendaire) for Miguel Poiares Maduro, at the time an Advocate General at the Court of Justice of the European Union.

After his tenure at the Court of Justice, Azoulai became a professor of law at Paris-Panthéon-Assas University, a position he held until 2015. However, from 2009 to 2015 he was seconded to the European University Institute, where he held a Chair in European Law. During this second period in Florence, Azoulai was a co-director of the Academy of European Law and of the Centre for Judicial Cooperation.

Once his second period in Florence was completed, Azoulai returned to France, joining Sciences Po as a Professor of European Law before returning to the European University Institute as a Professor of Law and Social Europe. In this capacity, his research revolves around issues related to the interactions between European law and European societies. With Armin von Bogdandy, Azoulai leads the "Exploring European Society" project, which examines the notion of "European society" as a legal project.

As part of his academic work, Azoulai is a member of the editorial board of the legal journals Common Market Law Review and Revue trimestrielle de droit européen. In 2019, he was a panel member for the ERC Advanced Grant selection procedure, within the area of [ Social Sciences and Humanities].

== Selected publications ==
- Azoulai, Loïc. "The Court of Justice and the social market economy: the emergence of an ideal and the conditions for its realization." Common Market Law Review 45.5 (2008).
- Maduro, Luis Miguel Poiares Pessoa, and Loïc Azoulai, eds. The past and future of EU law: the classics of EU law revisited on the 50th anniversary of the Rome Treaty. Bloomsbury Publishing, 2010. Reviewed by Niamh Nic Shuibhne at the Yearbook of European Law.
- Azoulai, Loïc. "The Retained Powers' Formula in the Case Law of the European Court of Justice: EU Law as Total Law." Eur. J. Legal Stud. 4 (2011): 178.
- Azoulai, Loïc. "“Integration through law” and us." International Journal of Constitutional Law 14.2 (2016): 449-463.
- Azoulai, Loïc. "The law of European society." Common Market Law Review 59.Special (2022).
