= EFU =

EFU may refer to:

- Egyptian Feminist Union, the first nationwide feminist movement in Egypt
- Sixpack (European Union law), A fiscal law in the European Union
- European Fiscal Compact, An intergovernmental budget treaty in the European Union
- Exclusive Farm Use, a designation under land use in Oregon
- EFU Group, a Pakistan-based insurance company
- EFU tornado, a category on the Enhanced Fujita scale indicating a tornado of unknown intensity
