= Economic and Monetary Union of the European Union =

Economic union and policies

The Economic and Monetary Union (EMU) Members of the eurozone ERM II member with opt-out (Denmark) Other EU members

The economic and monetary union (EMU) of the European Union is a group of policies aimed at converging the economies of member states of the European Union at three stages.

There are three stages of the EMU, each of which consists of progressively closer economic integration. Only once a state participates in the third stage it is permitted to adopt the euro as its official currency. As such, the third stage is largely synonymous with the eurozone. The euro convergence criteria are the set of requirements that needs to be fulfilled in order for a country to be approved to participate in the third stage. An important element of this is participation for a minimum of two years in the European Exchange Rate Mechanism ("ERM II"), in which candidate currencies demonstrate economic convergence by maintaining limited deviation from their target rate against the euro.

The EMU policies cover all European Union member states. All new EU member states must commit to participate in the third stage in their treaties of accession and are obliged to enter the third stage once they comply with all convergence criteria. Twenty-one EU member states, including most recently Bulgaria, have entered the third stage and have adopted the euro as their currency. Denmark, whose EU membership predates the introduction of the euro, has a legal opt-out from the EU Treaties and is thus not required to enter the third stage.

== History ==
=== Early developments ===
The idea of an economic and monetary union in Europe was first raised well before establishing the European Communities. For example, the Latin Monetary Union existed from 1865 to 1927. In the League of Nations, Gustav Stresemann asked in 1929 for a European currency against the background of an increased economic division due to a number of new nation states in Europe after World War I.

In 1957 at the European Forum Alpbach, De Nederlandsche Bank Governor Marius Holtrop argued that a common central-bank policy was necessary in a unified Europe, but his subsequent advocacy of a coordinated initiative by the European Community's central banks was met with skepticism from the heads of the National Bank of Belgium, Bank of France and Deutsche Bundesbank.

A first concrete attempt to create an economic and monetary union between the members of the European Communities goes back to an initiative by the European Commission in 1969, which set out the need for "greater co-ordination of economic policies and monetary cooperation," which was followed by the decision of the Heads of State or Government at their summit meeting in The Hague in 1969 to draw up a plan by stages with a view to creating an economic and monetary union by the end of the 1970s.

On the basis of various previous proposals, an expert group chaired by Luxembourg's Prime Minister and Finance Minister, Pierre Werner, presented in October 1970 the first commonly agreed blueprint to create an economic and monetary union in three stages (Werner plan). The project experienced serious setbacks from the crises arising from the non-convertibility of the US dollar into gold in August 1971 (i.e., the collapse of the Bretton Woods System) and from rising oil prices in 1972. An attempt to limit the fluctuations of European currencies, using a snake in the tunnel, failed.

=== Delors Report ===
The debate on EMU was fully re-launched at the Hannover Summit in June 1988, when the ad hoc Delors Committee of the central bank governors of the twelve member states, chaired by the President of the European Commission, Jacques Delors, was asked to propose a new timetable with clear, practical and realistic steps for creating an economic and monetary union. This way of working was derived from the Spaak method.

The Delors report of 1989 set out a plan to introduce the EMU in three stages and it included the creation of institutions like the European System of Central Banks (ESCB), which would become responsible for formulating and implementing monetary policy.

The three stages for the implementation of the EMU were the following:

=== Stage One: 1 July 1990 to 31 December 1993 ===
- On 1 July 1990, exchange controls are abolished, thus capital movements are completely liberalised in the European Economic Community.
- The Treaty of Maastricht in 1992 establishes the completion of the EMU as a formal objective and sets a number of economic convergence criteria, concerning the inflation rate, public finances, interest rates and exchange rate stability.
- The treaty enters into force on 1 November 1993.

=== Stage Two: 1 January 1994 to 31 December 1998 ===
- The European Monetary Institute is established as the forerunner of the European Central Bank, with the task of strengthening monetary cooperation between the member states and their national banks, as well as supervising ECU banknotes.
- On 16 December 1995, details such as the name of the new currency (the euro) as well as the duration of the transition periods are decided.
- On 16–17 June 1997, the European Council decides at Amsterdam to adopt the Stability and Growth Pact, designed to ensure budgetary discipline after creation of the euro, and a new exchange rate mechanism (ERM II) is set up to provide stability above the euro and the national currencies of countries that haven't yet entered the eurozone.
- On 3 May 1998, at the European Council in Brussels, the 11 initial countries that will participate in the third stage from 1 January 1999 are selected.
- On 1 June 1998, the European Central Bank (ECB) is created, and on 31 December 1998, the conversion rates between the 11 participating national currencies and the euro are established.

=== Stage Three: 1 January 1999 and continuing ===
- From the start of 1999, the euro is now a real currency, and a single monetary policy is introduced under the authority of the ECB. A three-year transition period begins before the introduction of actual euro notes and coins, but legally the national currencies have already ceased to exist.
- On 1 January 2001, Greece joins the third stage of the EMU.
- On 1 January 2002, the euro notes and coins are introduced.
- On 1 January 2007, Slovenia joins the third stage of the EMU.
- On 1 January 2008, Cyprus and Malta join the third stage of the EMU.
- On 1 January 2009, Slovakia joins the third stage of the EMU.
- On 1 January 2011, Estonia joins the third stage of the EMU.
- On 1 January 2014, Latvia joins the third stage of the EMU.
- On 1 January 2015, Lithuania joins the third stage of the EMU.
- On 1 January 2023, Croatia joins the third stage of the EMU.
- On 1 January 2026, Bulgaria joins the third stage of the EMU.

== Criticism ==
There have been debates as to whether the eurozone countries constitute an optimum currency area.

There has also been significant doubt if all eurozone states really fulfilled a "high degree of sustainable convergence" as demanded by the Maastricht treaty as condition to join the Euro without getting into financial trouble later on.

=== Monetary policy inflexibility ===
Since membership of the eurozone establishes a single monetary policy and essentially use of a 'foreign currency' for the respective states, they can no longer use an isolated national monetary policy as an economic tool within their central banks. Nor can they issue money to finance any required government deficits or pay interest on government bond sales. All this is effected centrally from the ECB. As a consequence, if member states do not manage their economy in a way that they can show a fiscal discipline (as they were obliged by the Maastricht treaty), the mechanism means a member state could effectively 'run out of money' to finance spending. This is characterized as a sovereign debt crisis where a country is without the possibility of refinancing itself with a sovereign currency. This is what happened to Greece, Ireland, Portugal, Cyprus, and Spain.

== Plans for reformed Economic and Monetary Union ==
Being of the opinion that the pure austerity course was not able to solve the Euro-crisis, French President François Hollande reopened the debate about a reform of the architecture of the eurozone. The intensification of work on plans to complete the existing EMU in order to correct its economic errors and social upheavals soon introduced the keyword "genuine" EMU. At the beginning of 2012, a proposed correction of the defective Maastricht currency architecture comprising: introduction of a fiscal capacity of the EU, common debt management and a completely integrated banking union, appeared unlikely to happen. Additionally, there were widespread fears that a process of strengthening the Union's power to intervene in eurozone member states and to impose flexible labour markets and flexible wages, might constitute a serious threat to Social Europe. In the negotiation process, member states advocated different solutions depending on their social and political characteristics, while the result was a broad compromise.

=== First EMU reform plan (2012–2015) ===
In December 2012, at the height of the European sovereign debt crisis, which revealed a number of weaknesses in the architecture of the EMU, a report entitled "Towards a genuine Economic and Monetary Union" was issued by the four presidents of the Council, European Commission, ECB and Eurogroup. The report outlined the following roadmap for implementing actions being required to ensure the stability and integrity of the EMU:

Roadmap	Action plan	Status as of June 2015
Stage 1: Ensuring fiscal sustainability and breaking the costly link between banks and sovereigns (2012–13)	Framework for fiscal governance shall be completed through implementation of: Six-Pack, Fiscal Compact, and Two-Pack.	Point fully achieved through entry into force of the Six‑Pack in December 2011, Fiscal Compact in January 2013 and Two‑Pack in May 2013.
Stage 1: Ensuring fiscal sustainability and breaking the costly link between banks and sovereigns (2012–13)	Establish a framework for systematic Ex Ante Coordination of major economic policy reforms (as per Article 11 of the Treaty on Stability, Coordination and Governance).	A pilot project was conducted in June 2014, which recommended the design of the yet to be developed Ex Ante Coordination (EAC) framework, should be complementary to the instruments already in use as part of the European Semester, and should be based on the principle of "voluntary participation and non-binding outcome". Meaning the end result of an EAC should not be a final dictate, but instead just an early delivered politically approved non-binding "advisory note" put forward to the national parliament, which then can be taken into consideration, as part of their process on improving and finalizing the design of their major economic reform in the making.
Stage 1: Ensuring fiscal sustainability and breaking the costly link between banks and sovereigns (2012–13)	Establish European Banking Supervision as a first element of the Banking union of the European Union, and ensure the proposed Capital Requirements Directive and Regulation (CRD‑IV/CRR) will enter into force.	This point was fully achieved, when CRD‑IV/CRR entered into force in July 2013 and European Banking Supervision became operational in November 2014.
Stage 1: Ensuring fiscal sustainability and breaking the costly link between banks and sovereigns (2012–13)	Agreement on the harmonisation of national resolution and deposit guarantee frameworks, so that the financial industry across all countries contribute appropriately under the same set of rules.	This point has now been fully achieved, through the Bank Recovery and Resolution Directive (BRRD; Directive 2014/59/EU of 15 May 2014) which established a common harmonized framework for the recovery and resolution of credit institutions and investment firms found to be in danger of failing, and through the Deposit Guarantee Scheme Directive (DGSD; Directive 2014/49/EU of 16 April 2014) which regulates deposit insurance in case of a bank's inability to pay its debts.
Stage 1: Ensuring fiscal sustainability and breaking the costly link between banks and sovereigns (2012–13)	Establish a new operational framework under the auspice of the European Stability Mechanism (ESM), for conducting "direct bank recapitalization" between the ESM rescue fund and a country-specific systemic bank in critical need, so that the general government of the country in which the beneficiary is situated won't be involved as a guaranteeing debtor on behalf of the bank. This proposed new instrument, would be contrary to the first framework made available by ESM for "bank recapitalizations" (utilized by Spain in 2012–13), which required the general government to step in as a guaranteeing debtor on behalf of its beneficiary banks – with the adverse impact of burdening their gross debt-to-GDP ratio.	ESM made the proposed "direct bank recapitalization" framework operational starting from December 2014, as a new novel ultimate backstop instrument for systemic banks in their recovery/resolution phase, if such banks will be found in need to receive additional recapitalization funds after conducted bail-in by private creditors and regulated payment by the Single Resolution Fund.
Stage 2: Completing the integrated financial framework and promoting sound structural policies (2013–14)	Complete the Banking union of the European Union, by establishing the Single Resolution Mechanism (SRM) as a common resolution authority and setting up the Single Resolution Fund (SRF) as an appropriate financial backstop.	SRM was established in January 2015, SRF started working from January 2016.
Stage 2: Completing the integrated financial framework and promoting sound structural policies (2013–14)	Establish a new "mechanism for stronger coordination, convergence and enforcement of structural policies based on arrangements of a contractual nature between Member States and EU institutions on the policies countries commit to undertake and on their implementation". The envisaged contractual arrangements "could be supported with temporary, targeted and flexible financial support", although if such support is granted it "should be treated separately from the multiannual financial framework".	Status unknown. (mentioned as part of stage 2 in the updated 2015 reform plan)
Stage 3: Improving the resilience of EMU through the creation of a shock-absorption function at the central level (2015 and later)	"Establish a well-defined and limited fiscal capacity to improve the absorption of country-specific economic shocks, through an insurance system set up at the central level." Such fiscal capacity would reinforce the resilience of the eurozone, and is envisaged to be complementary to the "contractual arrangements" created in stage 2. The idea is to establish it as a built-in incentives-based system, so that eurozone Member States eligible for participation in this centralized asymmetrically working "economic shock-absorption function" are encouraged to continue implementing sound fiscal policy and structural reforms in accordance with their "contractual obligations", making these two new instruments intrinsically linked and mutually reinforcing.	Status unknown. (mentioned as part of stage 2 in the updated 2015 reform plan)
Stage 3: Improving the resilience of EMU through the creation of a shock-absorption function at the central level (2015 and later)	Establish an increasing degree of "common decision-making on national budgets" and an "enhanced coordination of economic policies". A subject to "enhanced coordination", could in example be the specific taxation and employment policies implemented by the National Job Plan of each Member State (published as part of their annual National Reform Programme).	Status unknown. (mentioned as part of stage 2 in the updated 2015 reform plan)

=== Second EMU reform plan (2015–2025): The Five Presidents' Report ===
In June 2015, a follow-up report entitled "Completing Europe's Economic and Monetary Union" (often referred to as the "Five Presidents Report") was issued by the presidents of the Council, European Commission, ECB, Eurogroup and European Parliament. The report outlined a roadmap for further deepening of the EMU, meant to ensure a smooth functioning of the currency union and to allow the member states to be better prepared for adjusting to global challenges:

- Stage 1 (July 2015 – June 2017): The EMU should be made more resilient by building on existing instruments and making the best possible use of the existing Treaties. In other words, "deepening by doing". This first stage comprise implementation of the following eleven working points.
1. Deepening the Economic Union by ensuring a new boost to convergence, jobs and growth across the entire eurozone. This shall be achieved by:
  - Creation of a eurozone system of Competitiveness Authorities:
    Each eurozone state shall (like Belgium and Netherlands already did) create an independent national body in charge of tracking its competitiveness performance and policies for improving competitiveness. The proposed "Eurozone system of Competitiveness Authorities" would bring together these national bodies and the Commission, which on an annual basis would coordinate the "recommendation for actions" being issued by the national Competitiveness Authorities.
  - Strengthened implementation of the Macroeconomic Imbalance Procedure:
    (A) Its corrective arm (Excessive Imbalance Procedure) is currently only triggered if excessive imbalances are identified while the state subsequently also fails to deliver a National Reform Programme sufficiently addressing the found imbalances, and the reform implementation surveillance reports published for states with excessive imbalance but without EIP only work as a non-legal peer-pressure instrument. In the future, the EIP should be triggered as soon as excessive imbalances are identified, so that the Commission more forcefully within this legal framework can require implementation of structural reforms - followed by a period of extended reform implementation surveillance in which continued incompliance can be sanctioned.
    (B) The Macroeconomic Imbalance Procedure should also better capture imbalances (external deficits) for the eurozone as a whole - not just for each individual country, and also require implementation of reforms in countries accumulating large and sustained current account surpluses (if caused by insufficient domestic demand or low growth potential).
  - Greater focus on employment and social performance in the European Semester:
    There is no "one-size-fits-all" standard template to follow, meaning that no harmonized specific minimum standards are envisaged to be set up as compliance requirements in this field. But as the challenges often are similar across Member States, their performance and progress on the following indicators could be monitored in the future as part of the annual European Semester: (A) Getting more people of all ages into work; (B) Striking the right balance between flexible and secure labour contracts; (C) Avoiding the divide between "labor market insiders" with high protection and wages and "labor market outsiders"; (D) Shifting taxes away from labour; (E) Delivering tailored support for the unemployed to re-enter the labour market; (F) Improving education and lifelong learning; (G) Ensure that every citizen has access to an adequate education; (H) Ensure that an effective social protection system and "social protection floor" are in place to protect the most vulnerable in society; (I) Implementation of major reforms to ensure pension and health systems can continue functioning in a socially just way while coping with the rising economic expenditure pressures stemming from the rapidly ageing populations in Europe - in example by aligning the retirement age with life expectancy.
  - Stronger coordination of economic policies within a revamped European Semester:
    (A) The Country-Specific Recommendations which are already in place as part of the European Semester, need to focus more on "priority reforms", and shall be more concrete in regards of their expected outcome and time-frame for delivery (while still granting the Member State political maneuver room on how the exact measures shall be designed and implemented).
    (B) Periodic reporting on national reform implementation, regular peer reviews or a "comply-or-explain" approach should be used more systematically to hold the Member States accountable for the delivery of their National Reform Programme commitments. The Eurogroup could also play a coordinating role in cross-examining performance, with increased focus on benchmarking and pursuing best practices within the Macroeconomic Imbalance Procedure (MIP) framework.
    (C) The annual cycle of the European Semester should be supplemented by a stronger multi-annual approach in line with the renewed convergence process.
  - Completing and fully exploiting the Single Market by creating an Energy Union and Digital Market Union.
2. Complete construction of the Banking union of the European Union. This shall be achieved by:
  - Setting up a bridge financing mechanism for the Single Resolution Fund (SRF):
    Building up SRF with sufficient funds, is an ongoing process to be conducted through eight years of annual contributions made by the financial sector, as regulated by the Bank Recovery and Resolution Directive. The bridge financing mechanism is envisaged to be made available as a supplementing instrument, in order to make SRF capable straight from the first day it becomes operational (1 January 2016) to conduct potential large scale immediate transfers for resolution of financial institutions in critical need. The mechanism will only exist temporarily, until a certain level of funds have been collected by SRF.
  - Implementing concrete steps towards the common backstop to the SRF:
    An ultimate common backstop should also be established to the SRF, for the purpose of handling rare severe crisis events featuring a total amount of resolution costs beyond the capacity of the funds held by SRF. This could be done through the issue of an ESM financial credit line to SRF, with any potential draws from this extra standby arrangement being conditioned on simultaneous implementation of extra ex-post levies on the financial industry, to ensure full repayment of the drawn funds to ESM over a medium-term horizon.
  - Agreeing on a common European Deposit Insurance Scheme (EDIS):
    A new common deposit insurance would be less vulnerable than the current national deposit guarantee schemes, towards eruption of local shocks (in particular when both the sovereign and its national banking sector is perceived by the market to be in a fragile situation). It would also carry less risk for needing injection of additional public money to service its payment of deposit guarantees in the event of severe crisis, as failing risks would be spread more widely across all member states while its private sector funds would be raised over a much larger pool of financial institutions. EDIS would just like the national deposit guarantee schemes be privately funded through ex ante risk-based fees paid by all the participating banks in the Member States, and be devised in a way that would prevent moral hazard. Establishment of a fully-fledged EDIS will take time. A possible option would be to devise the EDIS as a re-insurance system at the European level for the national deposit guarantee schemes.
  - Improving the effectiveness of the instrument for direct bank recapitalisation in the European Stability Mechanism:
    The ESM instrument for direct bank recapitalisation was launched in December 2014, but should soon be reviewed for the purpose of loosening its restrictive eligibility criteria (currently it only applies for systemically important banks of countries unable to function as alternative backstop themselves without endangering their fiscal stability), while there should be made no change to the current requirement for a prior resolution bail-in by private creditors and regulated SRF payment for resolution costs first to be conducted before the instrument becomes accessible.
3. Launch a new Capital Markets Union (CMU):
  The European Commission has published a green paper describing how they envisage to build a new Capital Markets Union (CMU), and will publish a more concrete action plan for how to achieve it in September 2015. The CMU is envisaged to include all 28 EU Members and to be fully build by 2019. Its construction will:
  (A) Improve access to financing for all businesses across Europe and investment projects, in particular start-ups, SMEs and long-term projects.
  (B) Increase and diversify the sources of funding from investors in the EU and all over the world, so that companies (including SMEs) in addition to the already available bank credit lending also can tap capital markets through alternative funding sources that better suits them.
  (C) Make the capital markets work more effectively by connecting investors and those who need funding more efficiently, both within Member States and cross-border.
  (D) Make the capital markets more shock resilient by pooling cross-border private risk-sharing through a deepening integration of bond and equity markets, hereby also protecting it better against the risk for systemic shocks in the national financial sector.
  The establishment of the CMU, is envisaged at the same time to require a strengthening of the available tools to manage systemic risks of financial players prudently (macro-prudential toolkit), and a strengthening of the supervisory framework for financial actors to ensure their solidity and that they have sufficient risk management structures in place (ultimately leading to the launch of a new single European capital markets supervisor). A harmonized taxation scheme for capital market activities, could also play an important role in terms of providing a neutral treatment for different but comparable activities and investments across jurisdictions. A genuine CMU is envisaged also to require update of EU legislation in the following four areas: (A) Simplification of prospectus requirements; (B) Reviving the EU market for high quality securitisation; (C) Greater harmonisation of accounting and auditing practices; (D) Addressing the most important bottlenecks preventing the integration of capital markets in areas like insolvency law, company law, property rights and the legal enforceability of cross-border claims.
4. Reinforce the European Systemic Risk Board, so that it becomes capable of detecting risks to the financial sector as a whole.
5. Launch a new advisory European Fiscal Board:
  This new independent advisory entity would coordinate and complement the work of the already established independent national fiscal advisory councils. The board would also provide a public and independent assessment, at European level, of how budgets – and their execution – perform against the economic objectives and recommendations set out in the EU fiscal framework. Its issued opinions and advice should feed into the decisions taken by the Commission in the context of the European Semester.
6. Revamp the European Semester by reorganizing it to follow two consecutive stages. The first stage (stretching from November to February) shall be devoted to the eurozone as a whole, and the second stage (stretching from March to July) then subsequently feature a discussion of country specific issues.
7. Strengthen parliamentary control as part of the European Semester. This shall be achieved by:
  - Plenary debate at the European Parliament first on the Annual Growth Survey and then on the Country-Specific Recommendations.
  - More systematic interactions between Commissioners and national Parliaments on Country-Specific Recommendations and on national budgets.
  - More systematic consultation by governments of national Parliaments and social partners before submitting National Reform and Stability Programmes.
8. Increase the level of cooperation between the European Parliament and national Parliaments.
9. Reinforce the steer of the Eurogroup:
  As the Eurogroup will step up its involvement and steering role in the revamped European Semester, a reinforcement of its presidency and provided means at its disposal, may be required.
10. Take steps towards a consolidated external representation of the eurozone:
  The EU and the eurozone are still not represented as one voice in the international financial institutions (i.e. in IMF), which mean Europeans speak with a fragmented voice, leading to the EU punching below its political and economic weight. Although the building of consolidated external representation is desirable, it is envisaged to be a gradual process, with only the first steps to be taken in stage 1.
11. Integrate intergovernmental agreements into the framework of EU law. This includes the Treaty on Stability, Coordination and Governance, the relevant parts of the Euro Plus Pact; and the Intergovernmental Agreement on the Single Resolution Fund.
- Stage 2: The achievements of the first stage would be consolidated. On basis of consultation with an expert group, the European Commission will publish a white paper in Spring 2017, which will conduct an assessment of progress made in Stage 1, and outline in more details the next steps and measures needed for completion of the EMU in Stage 2. This second stage is currently envisaged to comprise:
1. The intergovernmental European Stability Mechanism should be moved into becoming part of the EU treaty law applying automatically for all eurozone member states (something which is possible to do within existing paragraphs of the current EU treaty), in order to simplify and institutionalize its governance.
2. More far-reaching measures (i.e. commonly agreed "convergence benchmark standards" of a more binding legal nature, and a treasury for the eurozone), could also be agreed to complete the EMU's economic and institutional architecture, for the purpose of making the convergence process more binding.
3. Significant progress towards these new common "convergence benchmark standards" (focusing primarily on labour markets, competitiveness, business environment, public administrations, and certain aspects of tax policy like i.e. the corporate tax base) – and a continued adherence to them once they are reached – would need to be verified by regular monitoring and would be among the conditions for each eurozone Member State to meet in order to become eligible for participation in a new fiscal capacity referred to as the "economic shock absorption mechanism", which will be established for the eurozone as a last element of this second stage. The fundamental idea behind the "economic shock absorption mechanism", is that its conditional shock absorbing transfers shall be triggered long before there is a need for ESM to offer the country a conditional macroeconomic crisis support programme, but that the mechanism at the same time never shall result in permanent annual transfers - or income equalizing transfers - between countries. A first building block of this "economic shock absorption mechanism", could perhaps be establishment of a permanent version of the European Fund for Strategic Investments, in which the tap by a country into the identified pool of financing sources and future strategic investment projects could be timed to occur upon the periodic eruption of downturns/shocks in its economic business cycle.
4. Another important pre-condition for the launch of the "economic shock absorption mechanism", is expected to be, that the eurozone first establish an increasing degree of "common decision-making on national budgets" and an "enhanced coordination of economic policies" (i.e. of the specific taxation and employment policies implemented by the National Job Plan of each Member State - which is published as part of their annual National Reform Programme).
- Stage 3 (by 2025): Reaching the final stage of "a deep and genuine EMU", by also considering the prospects of potential EU treaty changes.

All of the above three stages are envisaged to bring further progress on all four dimensions of the EMU:

1. Economic union: Focusing on convergence, prosperity, and social cohesion.
2. Financial union: Completing the Banking union of the European Union and constructing a capital markets union.
3. Fiscal union: Ensuring sound and integrated fiscal policies
4. Political Union: Enhancing democratic accountability, legitimacy and institutional strengthening of the EMU.

=== Primary sources ===
The Historical Archives of the European Central Bank published the minutes, reports and transcripts of the Committee for the Study of Economic and Monetary Union ('Delors Committee') in March 2020.

== See also ==
- Capital Markets Union
- Banking union of the European Union
- Economy of the European Union
- European Central Bank
- European Supervisory Authorities
- Internal market
