= TwoPack =

Two pack may refer to:

- Collections of two objects of the same type
  - Twopack (European Union law), two regulations to reform a part of the Stability and Growth Pact for eurozone member states
- Media and entertainment
  - 2Pac, the artist name of the American rapper, actor, poet and activist Tupac Amaru Shakur (June 16, 1971 – September 13, 1996)
