= Committee on Monetary, Financial and Balance of Payments Statistics =

Advisory committee

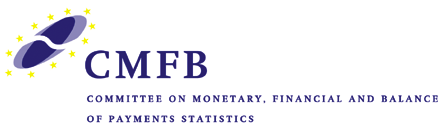
- Abbreviation: CMFB
- Formation: 1991; 35 years ago
- Founder: European Commission
- Type: Governmental commission
- Purpose: Advise
- Region served: Europe
- Products: Advisories
- Owner: European Union
- Website: www.cmfb.org -->

Committee on Monetary, Financial and Balance of Payments Statistics (CMFB) is an advisory committee for the European Commission (Eurostat) and European Central Bank for cooperation between the statistical and central banking community in the European Union.

== History ==
The CMFB was originally established in 1991.

It was designed so that the European Commission, on its own initiative, and, should the occasion arise, following a request from the Council or from the committees, could consult the Committee on:

- the establishment of multiannual Community programmes for monetary, financial and balance of payments statistics;
- the measures which the Commission intends to undertake to achieve the objectives referred to in the multiannual programmes for monetary, financial and balance of payments statistics and the resources and timetables involved;
- any other question, in particular questions of methodology, arising from the establishment or implementation of the Statistical Programme in the relevant fields.

The Committee may express opinions on its own initiative on any questions relating to the establishment or the implementation of statistical programmes in the monetary, financial and balance of payments fields.

== Opinions ==
The CMFB's main output are its opinions, adopted by a majority of its members, according to the applicable rules of procedure. Special rules apply for adoption opinion in the context of the Excessive Deficit Procedure

Below is a list of the most recent significant opinions that the Committee has concluded, upon the request of one or more EU Member States:

12 July 2023	CMFB opinion on the Exchange of Confidential Statistical Information (ECI) on European Statistics for statistical purposes between the ESS and the ESCB
3 June 2023	CMFB opinion on the Legal Entity Identifier (LEI) as unique identifier of financial and non-financial companies for statistical purposes
13 March 2023	CMFB opinion on the supplementary table for reporting government interventions to mitigate the impact of high energy prices
30 November 2022	CMFB opinion on the amendment of the Eurostat Manual on Government Deficit and Debt, 2022 edition
11 August 2021	CMFB opinion on the supplementary table for the reporting of the Recovery and Resilience Facility (RRF) associated flows
23 March 2021	CMFB opinion on the supplementary table for the reporting of the measures taken by the Member States due to the COVID-19 pandemic
27 June 2019	CMFB opinion on the proposal for a Regulation of the European Parliament and of the Council establishing the Programme for single market, competitiveness of enterprises, including small and medium-sized enterprises, and European statistics
13 May 2019	CMFB opinion on the amendment of the Eurostat Manual on Government Deficit and Debt, 2019 edition
31 October 2018	CMFB opinion on the statistical treatment of asset partitioning in Energy Performance Contracts (EPCs)
25 September 2018	CMFB Opinion on the recording of Euro coins in national accounts
13 July 2017	CMFB opinion on the statistical classification of the Hungarian Export-Import Bank (Eximbank)
12 September 2016	CMFB opinion on re-shaping the connection between business statistics and BOP-IIP
13 May 2016	CMFB opinion on the principles for re-shaping the connection between business statistics and BoP/IIP

== Advisory role in the EU's Excessive Deficit Procedure ==
The CMFB's role in the excessive deficit procedure (EDP) is in an advisory capacity that include the following requirements:

- The format of the questionnaires shall be defined by the Commission (Eurostat) after consultation of the Committee on Monetary, Financial and Balance of Payments Statistics (hereinafter referred to as CMFB).
- The inventories shall be prepared in accordance with guidelines adopted by the Commission (Eurostat) after consultation of CMFB.
- In the event of a doubt regarding the correct implementation of the ESA 95 [today: ESA 2010] accounting rules, the Member State concerned shall request clarification from the Commission (Eurostat). The Commission (Eurostat) shall promptly examine the issue and communicate its clarification to the Member State concerned and, when appropriate, to the CMFB.
- For cases which are either complex or of general interest in the view of the Commission or the Member State concerned, the Commission (Eurostat) shall take a decision after consultation of the CMFB. The Commission (Eurostat) shall make decisions public, together with the opinion of the CMFB, without prejudice to the provisions relating to statistical confidentiality of Regulation (EC) No 322/97.

== Quality in the EU's macroeconomic imbalance procedure ==
The CMFB's role in ensuring the quality of statistics underlying the EU's Macroeconomic Imbalance Procedure (MIP) is to make sure there are sound and harmonised official statistics.

The (ECOFIN) Council of the European Union, in its 2015 conclusions on EU statistics, recalled that the Macroeconomic Imbalances Procedure must rely upon such statistics. The Council welcomed the close cooperation of the European Statistical System (ESS) and the European System of Central Banks (ESCB), using existing fora, in ensuring the reliability of the statistics underlying the Macroeconomic Imbalances Procedure (MIP) and their comparability, welcomed the production of the first ESS-ESCB quality report on MIP statistics and encouraged the two statistical systems to give high priority to taking forward this programme.

As the statistics underlying MIP indicators are compiled, depending on domain, either or both by both the European Statistical System (ESS) and the European System of Central Banks (ESCB) within their respective spheres of competence, the two systems continuously cooperate statistical quality assurance mechanisms to ensure that these statistics are reliable and comparable across Member States. According to the Memorandum of Understanding between the ESS and the ESCB, the Committee on monetary, financial and balance of payments statistics (CMFB) is the operational platform for such cooperation.

The CMFB, starting 2013, developed a three level quality assurance framework for the statistics underlying the Macroeconomic Imbalance Procedure and published the related quality reports (Quality reports concerning statistics underlying the MIP indicators).
