= Euro Plus Pact =

Intergovernmental agreement

Eurozone participants Non-Eurozone participants Other EU member states

The Euro-Plus Pact (or Euro+ Pact, also initially called the Competitiveness Pact or later the Pact for the Euro) was adopted in March 2011 under EU's Open Method of Coordination, as an intergovernmental agreement between all member states of the European Union (except Croatia, Czech Republic, Hungary and Sweden), in which concrete commitments were made to be working continuously within a new commonly agreed political general framework for the implementation of structural reforms intended to improve competitiveness, employment, financial stability and the fiscal strength of each country. The plan was advocated by the French and German governments as one of many needed political responses to strengthen the EMU in areas which the European sovereign-debt crisis had revealed as being too poorly constructed.

The pact was constructed as an attempt to incentivize increased implementation of structural reforms by each participating EU member state, to improve their performance within the four focus areas of the pact, through: (1) A regular bottom-up inter-governmental political dialogue (learning best practices from each other) and (2) A commitment for each state to include reform measures (freely chosen from a broad list of potential policy action responses) in their annual National Reform Programme for those of the areas found in critical need of improvement. It also featured a commitment to transpose and operationalize one of the Stability and Growth Pact fiscal rules directly into national legislation – to make it more effectively working, and a commitment to perform regular "structured dialogue" for enhanced tax policy coordination in EU.

In May 2015, the European Political Strategy Centre (in-house think tank of the European Commission) upon its analysis of the latest set of submitted National Reform Programmes, declared the pact was in a dormant state (not being actively used or referred to by the majority of participating states), and recommended it should be revived by moving it from its current intergovernmental state to become an integrated part of the European Semester in the EU framework law. In the latest approved plan for reforming the EMU, this recommendation was adopted with a target for its transposition to take place at the latest in June 2017.

== Euro-Plus Pact ==
The Euro-Plus Pact came with four broad strategic objectives along with more specific strategies for addressing these objectives. The four objectives are:

- fostering competitiveness
- fostering employment
- contributing to the sustainability of public finances
- reinforcing financial stability.

An additional fifth issue is:

- tax policy coordination

Although for tax policy coordination, there is no requirement to achieve certain improvements or implement specific measures, as member states only more vaguely:

"commit to engage in structured discussions on tax policy issues, notably to ensure the exchange of best practices, the avoidance of harmful practices, and consideration of proposals to fight against fraud and tax evasion."

The four key objectives listed above are intended to be addressed with individualized measures by all member countries of the pact, unless a Member State can "show that action is not needed" in a specific area. While the pact comes with specific strategies, these are not compulsory. Specifically the pact states:

"The choice of the specific policy actions necessary to achieve the common objectives remains the responsibility of each country, but particular attention will be paid to the set of possible measures mentioned below."

Each member state commits at an annual frequency to "agree at the highest level on a set of concrete [policy] actions to be achieved within 12 months". The actions and initiatives taken by each member state across the four common key objectives, shall after having been agreed, then be noted as an explicit part of their "National Reform Program" and/or "Stability/Convergence Program" reports, being published annually in March/April. Finally, in addition to this:

"Member States also commit to consult their partners on each major economic reform having potential spill-over effects before its adoption".

=== Competitiveness ===
This area of the pact, is the same as several European countries had to address in the 1980s by abolishing Wage Indexation. The need for competitiveness improvements will be evaluated for each country upon analysis of its national Unit Labour Cost (ULC), a quantitative measure of wage costs per unit produced or serviced, and is to be addressed by measures that will reduce the cost of labour and/or measures that will increase productivity. Each country will be responsible for the selection of its own specific policy actions to improve competitiveness, but should mainly pick and choose between the following reform types:

Labour cost reducing measures

- Reforming the "wage setting arrangements", and where necessary adjust the "degree of centralisation in the bargaining process" and "wage indexation mechanisms".
- Ensure wages in the public sector only increase at a modest pace (equal to or below the inflation rate), as this has a strong signaling effect on the wage setting in the private sector.

Productivity increasing measures

- Deregulating industries by removing unjustified restrictions on professional services and the retail sector, so that competition and efficiency will increase.
- Improve infrastructure.
- Improve education systems.
- Promote and/or invest in Research & Development and innovation initiatives.
- Improve the business environment, notably by removing red tape and improving the regulatory framework (i.e. bankruptcy laws, commercial code).

=== Employment ===
This objective will be evaluated on basis of measured figures for the long-term unemployment rate, youth unemployment rate and labour participation rates. Beside of full employment being an objective by itself, a flexible all-inclusive labour market with security arrangements removing barriers for employees to conduct an increased amount of job shifts throughout their working career, also positively spill-over into improving the competitiveness. Each country will be responsible for the selection of its own specific policy actions to improve employment, but should mainly pick and choose between the following reform types:

- Labour market reforms to promote the "flexicurity" model, reduce undeclared work, and increase labour participation.
- Reforms to support lifelong learning of the already employed/educated working force.
- Tax reforms: "lowering taxes on labour" and "taking measures to facilitate the participation of second earners in the work force".

=== Sustainability of public finances ===
This objective will be assessed on basis of the sustainability gap indicators (S0 for the short-term, S1 for the medium-term and S2 for the long-term), which the Commission already publish every third year in their fiscal sustainability report (as part of their work to calculate appropriate minimum Medium-Term budgetary Objectives for each EU member state). If the composite S0 indicator is above 0.43, it signals existence of too high risk for fiscal stress in the short-term, which call on implementation of immediate counter measures. If the fiscal gap indicators S1 and/or S2 indicators are positive, it means debt levels are forecast to become unsustainable in the medium-term and/or long-term under a no-policy-change assumption, because of increasing public expenditures caused by demographic factors. If such S1 or S2 sustainability issues arise, they are to be addressed through implementation of fiscal consolidation leading to sufficient annual improvements for the structural budget balance and/or by increasing the sustainability of pensions, health care and social benefits systems through the following expenditure saving reforms:

- Aligning the effective retirement age with life expectancy, so that the pension system better can shoulder the demographic situation.
- Limiting early retirement schemes, and using targeted incentives for older workers in the age tranche above 55 still to be employed.
- Implement reforms to increase employment participation rates.
- Healthcare system reforms, focused either on reducing overall costs through implementing more cost efficient systems, or alternatively introducing certain level of privately paid healthcare contributions.

To further safeguard fiscal sustainability, one of the most stringent conditions of the pact is given with respect to also implementing national fiscal rules:

"Participating Member States commit to translating EU fiscal rules as set out in the Stability and Growth Pact into national legislation."

When implementing a balanced budget amendment, Member States are free to choose the type of legislation instrument (i.e. constitutional law or framework law), as long as it impose a "sufficiently strong binding" condition and a "durable nature". The law-enforced rule, needs to be fully compliant with the Stability and Growth Pact rules, but the exact formulation of the rule is up for each country to decide, as it could either be a "debt brake rule, or a rule related to the primary balance or an expenditure benchmark rule." Additionally, in case sub-national levels of the general government have autonomy to issue debt or other liabilities, the rule should ensure enforcement of fiscal discipline both at the national and sub-national levels.

=== Financial stability ===
The Financial stability will be measured quantitatively for each country with respect to its "level of private debt for banks, households and non-financial firms." With assistance from the President of the European Systemic Risk Board, the countries will be regularly informed on their present state of macro-financial stability, and will be expected to put into place "national legislation" to resolve potential problems. In addition, all participating Member States commit to adopt a fully community acquis compliant national legislation for banking resolution.

=== Tax policy coordination ===
The Euro Plus Pact does not entail any specific commitments on tax policy initiatives, other than to briefly outline that member states commit to engage in discussions about it through a regular "structured dialogue". Tax policy coordination is expected to help strengthen the sharing of best practices and fight against tax fraud and evasion. Direct taxation remains a national competence for each Euro Plus Pact member to decide upon individually. The European Commission had presented a proposal to introduce a Common Consolidated Corporate Tax Base (CCCTB) with appliance for all EU member states already back in March 2011, which if agreed could be a revenue neutral way to ensure consistency among national tax systems, while respecting national tax strategies - as it refrain to set a common tax rate. The Euro Plus Pact explicit mentioned, that its featured "structured dialogue" for "tax policy coordination", should also be used for the purpose to try and reach a future CCCTB agreement. The CCCTB proposal had still not reached any final agreement as of June 2015, which prompted the commission to announce they will now submit a relaunched less ambitious CCCTB proposal in 2016 - leaving out the more difficult "consolidation part" for later agreement - so that the core CCTB can be adopted more rapidly in the short-term.

In November 2011, the Finance ministers of all 23 participating states agreed on the content and format of the regular "structured dialogue" on tax policy coordination. The dialogue was decided to focus on: Avoidance of harmful practices, fight against fraud and tax evasion, exchange of best practices, prospects for International Coordination, and other potential issues (including taxation challenges related to digital economy, stronger alignment of national tax systems in specific areas like the recently proposed CCCTB, financial transaction tax, environmental and energy taxation, sustainability of tax systems, and empirical analysis of the impact of tax changes on growth). It was agreed, to set up a regular monitoring and reporting to the highest political level (European Council meetings) by the end of each future Council presidencies, on the following issues: "progress within the structured dialogue, concrete results in the field of tax coordination, avenues explored and specific issues on which agreement could be reached". Status reports for the structured dialogue on tax policy coordination, were subsequently published in: June 2012, November 2012, June 2013, December 2013, June 2014, December 2014, and June 2015. These regular specific reports which focus on Euro Plus related taxation dialogues, supplement those being simultaneously published by the ECOFIN council - which produce status on all relevant tax dialogues conducted between all EU member states. The ECOFIN tax dialogue reports were also published in June 2012, November 2012, June 2013, December 2013, June 2014, December 2014, and June 2015.

== Participation ==
On 25 March 2011 the proposal for economic measures and cooperation was adopted by the European Council and included as participants without any caveats the Eurozone member states as well as Bulgaria, Denmark, Latvia, Lithuania, Poland and Romania. The EU members which did not participate are Czech Republic, Hungary, Sweden and the United Kingdom, all for different reasons. Croatia subsequently acceded to the EU in July 2013.

== Progress ==
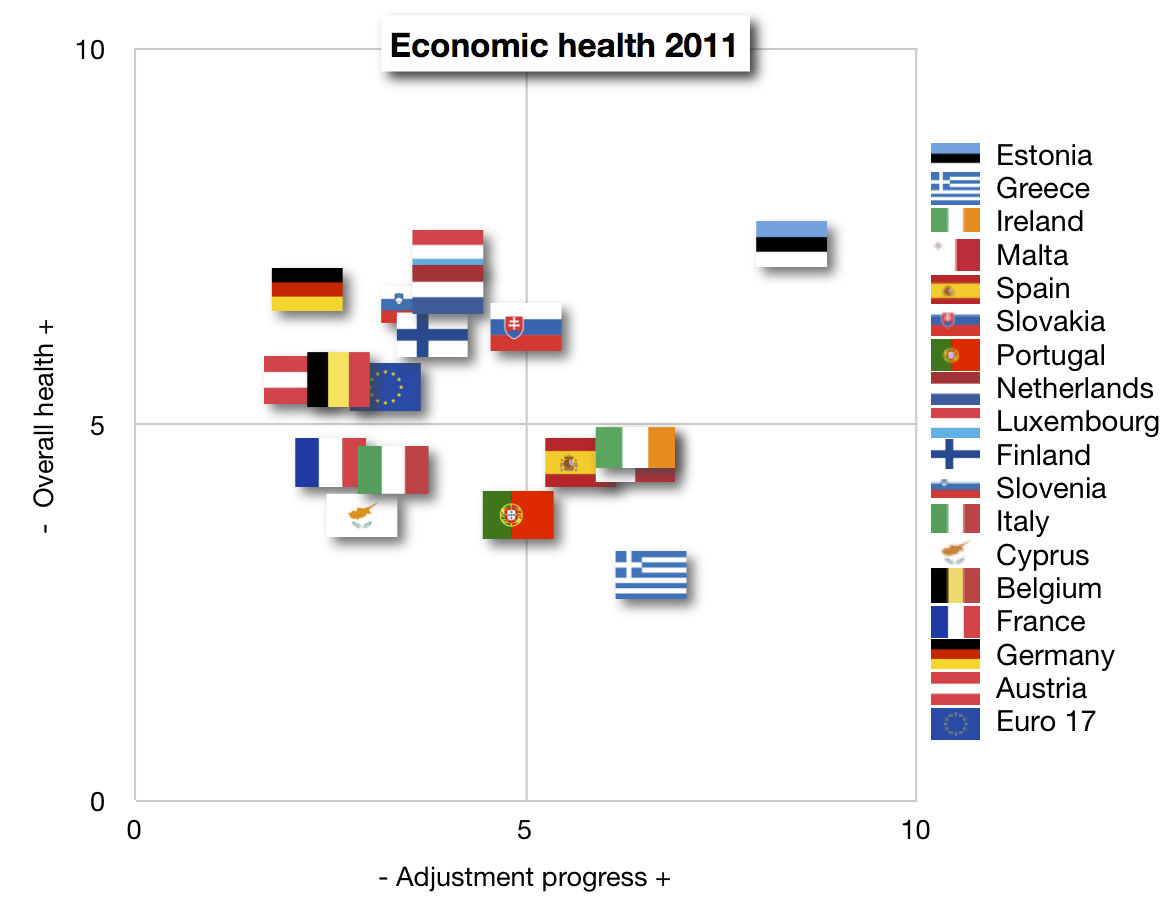
Eurozone economic health and adjustment progress according to Euro Plus Monitor Report 2011

The pact did not set up any structures or agreement for an independent monitoring of reform progress among its participating members. However, as a third party independent initiative aimed to keep institutional investors informed, the annual Euro Plus Monitor report conducts a comparative competitiveness ranking for all eurozone states and selected EU member states, as per the joint analysis and opinion of Berenberg Bank and the Lisbon Council. According to the Euro Plus Monitor report 2011, many eurozone member countries were found to be rapidly reforming to increase the competitiveness of their economies as of November 2011. The report also found that "Many of those countries most in need to adjust [...] are now making the greatest progress towards restoring their fiscal balance and external competitiveness". Greece, Ireland, Malta and Spain are among the top five reformers among 17 countries included in the report. The monitor report was also published in 2012, 2013, and 2014.

== The original plan: The Competitiveness Pact ==
The original plan was announced by Germany and France in February 2011 and called for six policy changes to be set as well as for a monitoring system to be implemented to ensure progress. The four objectives are: abolishing wage indexation, raising pension ages, creating a common base for corporate tax and adopting debt brakes. In the following sections the motivation for and criticism of each objective is summarized.

Abolishing wage indexation

Wage indexation is the process of adjusting wages to compensate for inflation, which reduces the value of money over time. Abolishing indexation would allow for real wages to decrease increasing the competitiveness of countries as it becomes less expensive to employ people. Understandably this policy objective has been called into question by some governments such as Belgium as it reduces people's purchasing power.

Raising pension ages

In countries with "pay as you go" pension systems, as most European countries have, raising pension ages has a very profound impact on government revenue as people who continue working will also pay taxes instead of requiring them. This too is a controversial proposal as can be seen in the 2010 French pension reform strikes.

Creating a common base for corporate taxes

Creating a "common base" is perceived by some as a first step in a process of unifying tax rates and as such has been opposed by countries such as Ireland, which have low corporate tax rates. The opinion of the European Commission is that having a common rules for calculating of the base amount over which the different national tax rates are applied is beneficial for the enterprises since it will reduce the administrative burden and costs of maintaining compliance with 27 different rule sets for corporate bookkeeping.

Adopting debt brakes

The word "debt brake" comes from the German "Schuldenbremse", an amendment to the constitution legally limiting the size of sovereign debt countries are allowed to run. These have been implemented in Switzerland in 2003 and in Germany in 2010. Debt brakes can vary in strictness and details of the intended implementation are not yet clear, but the motivation for this rule is to create a legally binding policy instead of the current budget guidelines on deficits which have been not been implemented by member countries.

== Criticism ==
The plan has been criticised for impinging on the sovereignty of countries, due to its authority to set policy in areas that were previously under national sovereignty. The reforms that the pact contain have also been criticised as being too harsh, or conversely called into question for not being strict enough in its requirements to implement reforms. On the other hand, some leaders agree that in order to avoid dangerous nationalisms and have fiscal and economic governance, it is necessary to transfer sovereignty.

== See also ==
- Enhanced co-operation
- European sovereign debt crisis
- European Fiscal Union
- Treaty of Lisbon
- Sixpack (EU)
