= European Fiscal Compact =

Intergovernmental treaty

Fiscal Compact
Treaty on Stability, Coordination and Governance in the Economic and Monetary Union
- Parties to the Fiscal Compact within the eurozone outside the eurozone outside the eurozone (not bound by fiscal or economic coordination provisions)
- Type: Intergovernmental agreement
- Drafted: 30 January 2012 ^{(treaty finalised)}
- Signed: 2 March 2012
- Location: Brussels, Belgium
- Effective: 1 January 2013
- Condition: Ratified by twelve eurozone states
- Signatories: 25 EU member states (all except Croatia and Czech Republic) including all eurozone states
- Parties: 27 states (all EU member states)
- Depositary: General Secretariat of the Council of the EU
- Languages: 22 (All EU languages except Croatian & Czech)

Full text
- Treaty on Stability, Coordination and Governance in the Economic and Monetary Union at Wikisource

The Treaty on Stability, Coordination and Governance in the Economic and Monetary Union; also referred to as TSCG, or more plainly the Fiscal Stability Treaty is an intergovernmental treaty introduced as a new stricter version of the Stability and Growth Pact, signed on 2 March 2012 by all member states of the European Union (EU), except the Czech Republic and the United Kingdom. The treaty entered into force on 1 January 2013 for the 16 states which completed ratification prior to this date. As of 3 April 2019, it had been ratified and entered into force for all 25 signatories plus Croatia, which acceded to the EU in July 2013, and the Czech Republic.

The Fiscal Compact is the fiscal chapter of the Treaty (Title III). It binds 23 member states: the 21 member states of the eurozone, plus Denmark and Romania, who have chosen to opt in. It is accompanied by a set of common principles.

Member states bound by the Fiscal Compact have to transpose into their national legal order the provisions of the Fiscal Compact. In particular, the national budget has to be in balance or surplus, under the treaty's definition. An automatic correction mechanism has to be established to correct potential significant deviations. A national independent monitoring institution is required to provide fiscal surveillance. The treaty defines a balanced budget as a general budget deficit not exceeding 3.0% of the gross domestic product (GDP), and a structural deficit not exceeding a country-specific Medium-Term budgetary Objective (MTO) which at most can be set to 0.5% of GDP for states with a debt‑to‑GDP ratio exceeding 60% – or at most 1.0% of GDP for states with debt levels within the 60%-limit. The country-specific MTOs are recalculated every third year, and might be set at levels stricter than the greatest latitude permitted by the treaty. The treaty also contains a direct copy of the "debt brake" criteria outlined in the Stability and Growth Pact, which defines the rate at which debt levels above the limit of 60% of GDP shall decrease.

If the budget or estimated fiscal account for any ratifying state is found to be noncompliant with the deficit or debt criteria, the state is obliged to rectify the issue. If a state is in breach at the time of the treaty's entry into force, the correction will be deemed to be sufficient if it delivers sufficiently large annual improvements to remain on a country specific predefined "adjustment path" towards the limits at a midterm horizon. Should a state suffer a significant recession, it will be exempted from the requirement to deliver a fiscal correction for as long as it lasts.

Despite being an international treaty outside the EU legal framework, all treaty provisions function as an extension to existing EU regulations, utilising the same reporting instruments and organisational structures already created within the EU in the three areas: Budget discipline enforced by the Stability and Growth Pact (extended by Title III), Coordination of economic policies (extended by Title IV), and Governance within the EMU (extended by Title V). The treaty states that the signatories shall attempt to incorporate the Fiscal Compact into the EU's legal framework, on the basis of an assessment of the experience with its implementation, by 1 January 2018 at the latest. By 2017 it was determined that only Title 3 could be easily incorporated since otherwise treaty change would be required. Title 3 of the Fiscal Compact was subsequently incorporated into EU law as part of the economic governance framework reforms (Regulation (EU) 2024/1263, Council Directive (EU) 2024/1265 and Council Regulation (EU) 2024/1264) as of 4 April 2024.

== History ==
=== Background ===
Monetary policy in the eurozone (the EU countries which have adopted the Euro) is determined by the European Central Bank (ECB). Thus, the setting of central bank interest rates and monetary easing is in the sole domain of the ECB, while taxation and government expenditure remain mostly under the control of national governments, within the balanced budget limits imposed by the Stability and Growth Pact. The EU has a monetary union but not a fiscal union.

In October 2007, then ECB president, Jean-Claude Trichet, emphasised the need for the European Union (EU) to pursue further economic and financial integration within certain areas (among others, labour mobility and flexibility and reaching retail banking convergence). If these fiscal policies were adhered to by all member states, the ECB believed that this would increase their competitiveness. In June 2009, recommendations were published by The Economist magazine which suggested that Europe establish a fiscal union comprising a: "Bailout fund, banking union, mechanism to ensure the same prudent fiscal and economic policies were pursued equally by all states, and common issuance of eurobonds". Angel Ubide from the Peterson Institute for International Economics joined this view, suggesting that long-term stability in the eurozone required a common fiscal policy rather than controls on portfolio investment.

=== Response to the euro area crisis ===
Starting from early 2010, the proposal to create a much greater fiscal union, at least in the eurozone, was considered by many to be either the natural next step in European integration, or a necessary solution to the euro area crisis. Combined with the EMU, a fiscal union would, according to the authors of the Blueprint report, lead to much greater economic integration. However, the process of building a fiscal union was envisaged by them to be a long-term project. The presidents of the ECB, Commission, Council and Eurogroup published a blueprint for a deep and genuine EMU in November 2012, outlining the elements of a fiscal union which could be achieved in the short, medium and long-term. For the short term (0–18 months), only proposals within the existing competences of the EU treaties were considered, while more wide-reaching proposals requiring treaty amendments were only considered for longer time frames.

The blueprint report mentioned that the potential introduction of a common issuance of eurobills with 1-year maturity could be implemented in the medium term (18 months – 5 years ahead), while eurobonds with 10-year maturity could be implemented as the final step in the long term (more than 5 years ahead). According to the authors of the Blueprint report, each step the EU takes towards the sharing of common debt, the first of which is envisaged to include joint guarantees for debt repayment in conjunction with either a "debt redemption fund for excessive debt" or "issuance of some short-term eurobills", will need to be accompanied by increased coordination and harmonization of fiscal and economic policies in the eurozone. As such, the two reforms of the Stability and Growth Pact known as the sixpack (which entered into force December 2011) and twopack (planned entry into force in summer 2013), and the European Fiscal Compact (a treaty which largely mirrors these two EU reforms), represent, according to the authors of the Blueprint report, the first step towards the increased sharing and adherence to the same fiscal rules and economic policies, which they argue potentially paves the way for ratification in the medium term of a new EU treaty allowing for the common issuance of eurobills.

=== Proposal development: Sixpack, Twopack and Fiscal Compact ===
In March 2010, Germany presented a series of proposals to address the euro area crisis. They emphasised that the intention was not to establish a fiscal union in the short term, but to make the monetary union more resilient to crises. They argued that the previous Stability and Growth Pact needed to be reformed to become more strict and efficient, and in return a European emergency bailout fund should be founded to assist states in financial difficulties, with bailout payments available under strict corrective fiscal action agreements – subject to approval by the ECB and Eurogroup. In case a non-collaborating state with an Excessive Deficit Procedure (EDP) breached the called for adjustment path towards compliance, it should risk being fined or lose its payment of EU cohesion funds and/or lose its political voting rights in the Eurogroup. A call was also made to enforce the Coordination of economic policies between eurozone members, so that all states take an active part in each other's policymaking. Throughout the following three years, these German proposals materialised into new European agreements or regulations after negotiations with the other EU member states.

The envisaged emergency bailout fund, the European Financial Stability Facility (EFSF), was the first proposal to be agreed to by the EU member states on 9 May 2010, with the facility being fully operational on 4 August 2010.

As a part of the proposed reform of the Stability and Growth Pact, Germany also presented a proposal in May 2010 that all Eurozone states should be obliged to adopt a balanced budget framework law into its national legislation, preferably at the constitutional level, with the purpose of guaranteeing future compliance with the Pact's promise of ensuring a clear cap for Member States on new debt, strict budgetary discipline and balanced budgets. Implementation of the proposed debt brake was by itself envisaged to imply much tighter fiscal discipline compared to the existing EU rules requiring deficits not to exceed 3% of GDP. This proposal was later adopted as part of both the Fiscal Compact and Twopack regulations.

In late 2010, proposals were made to reform some rules of the Stability and Growth Pact to strengthen fiscal policy co-ordination. In February 2011, France and Germany had proposed the 'Competitiveness Pact' to strengthen economic co-ordination in the eurozone. Spain also endorsed the proposed pact. German Chancellor Angela Merkel also verbally championed the idea of a fiscal union, as did various incumbent European Finance ministers and the head of the European Central Bank.

In March 2011, a new reform of the Stability and Growth Pact was initiated, aiming at strengthening the rules by adopting an automatic procedure for imposing penalties in case of breaches of either the deficit or the debt rules.

By the end of 2011, Germany, France and other EU Member States went a step further and vowed to create a fiscal union across the eurozone with strict and enforceable fiscal rules and automatic penalties embedded in the EU treaties. German chancellor Angela Merkel also insisted that the European Commission and the Court of Justice of the European Union must play an "important role" in ensuring that countries meet their obligations.

In that perspective, they called for strong European Commission "oversight in the fields of taxation and budgetary policy and the enforcement mechanisms that go with it could further infringe upon the sovereignty of eurozone member states". Think-tanks such as the World Pensions Council (WPC) have argued that a profound revision of the Lisbon Treaty would be unavoidable if Germany were to succeed in imposing its economic views, as stringent orthodoxy across the budgetary, fiscal and regulatory fronts would necessarily go beyond the treaty in its current form, thus further reducing the individual prerogatives of national governments.

=== Negotiations ===
On 9 December 2011 at the European Council meeting, all 17 members of the eurozone agreed on the basic outlines of a new intergovernmental treaty to put strict caps on government spending and borrowing, with penalties for those countries who violate the limits. All other non-eurozone countries except the United Kingdom said they were also prepared to join in, subject to parliamentary vote. Originally EU leaders planned to change existing EU treaties but this was blocked by British prime minister David Cameron, who demanded that the City of London be excluded from future financial regulations, including the proposed EU financial transaction tax. Thus a separate treaty was then envisaged, outside the formal EU institutions, as it had been with the first Schengen treaty in 1985.

On 30 January 2012, after several weeks of negotiations, all EU leaders except those from the UK and the Czech Republic endorsed the final version of the fiscal pact at the informal meeting of EU Heads of State or Government in Brussels. However, the treaty was left open to accession by any EU member state and Czech prime minister Petr Nečas said his country may join in the future. The treaty would only become binding on the non-eurozone signatory states after they adopt the euro as their currency, unless they declare their intention to be bound by part, or all, of the treaty at an earlier date. The new treaty was signed on 2 March and came into force on 1 January 2013, as it had been ratified (which requires the approval of national parliaments) by at least 12 countries that use the euro. Ireland held a referendum on the treaty on 31 May 2012, which was approved by 60.3%.

EU countries that signed the agreement had to ratify it by 1 January 2013. Once a country has ratified the Treaty it has another year, until 1 January 2014, to implement a balanced budget rule in their binding legislation. Only countries with such rule in their legal code by 1 March 2013 will be eligible to apply for bailout money from the European Stability Mechanism (ESM).

=== Incorporation into EU law ===
Although the European Fiscal Compact was negotiated between 25 of the then 27 member states of the EU, it is not formally part of European Union law. It did, however, contain a provision foreseeing its incorporation into EU law within five years of its entering into force, i.e. January 2018.

An updated EMU reform plan was issued in June 2015 by 5 EU institutional presidents (of the Council of the EU, the European Commission, the ECB, the Eurogroup and the European Parliament) outlined a roadmap for integrating the Fiscal Compact and Single Resolution Fund agreement into the framework of EU law by June 2017, and the intergovernmental European Stability Mechanism by 2025. A proposal by the European Commission to incorporate the substance of the Fiscal Compact into EU law was published in December 2017. Title 3 of the Fiscal Compact was incorporated into EU law as part of the economic governance framework reforms (Regulation (EU) 2024/1263, Council Directive (EU) 2024/1265 and Council Regulation (EU) 2024/1264) which entered into force on 4 April 2024.

== Content ==
The treaty is divided into 6 titles. The first explains that the aim of the treaty is to "strengthen the economic pillar of the economic and monetary union" and that the treaty should be fully binding on Eurozone countries. Title II defines its relation to EU laws and the Treaties of the European Union, applying the Fiscal Compact only "insofar as it is compatible". Title VI contains the final clauses regarding ratification and entry into force.

Three Titles (III-V) contain the rules regarding fiscal discipline, coordination and governance.

=== Title III – Fiscal Compact ===
- Balanced budget rule: General government budgets shall be "balanced" or in surplus. The treaty defines a balanced budget as a general budget deficit not exceeding 3.0% of the gross domestic product (GDP), and a structural deficit not exceeding a country-specific Medium-Term budgetary Objective (MTO) which at most can be set to 0.5% of GDP for states with a debt‑to‑GDP ratio exceeding 60% – or at most 1.0% of GDP for states with debt levels within the 60%-limit. The country-specific MTOs are recalculated every third year, and might be set at stricter levels compared to what the treaty allows at most.
  The rule is based upon the existing Stability and Growth Pact (SGP) deficit rule, where the concept of country-specific MTOs was integrated into the preventive arm of the pact in 2005, with an upper limit for structural deficits at 1.0% of GDP applying to all eurozone and ERM-II member states. The novelty of the Fiscal Compact was to introduce a varying upper limit which depends on the debt-level of the state. When comparing the Fiscal Compact's new MTO rule with the applying country-specific SGP MTOs in 2012, it can be concluded that if the fiscal provisions of the treaty had applied immediately towards all EU member states, then only Hungary and the UK would have been required to introduce a stricter MTO (revising it down to 0.5% of GDP) – as a consequence.
  As per the already applying Stability and Growth Pact, Member States with a fiscal balance not yet at their MTO, are required to ensure rapid convergence towards it, with the timeframe for this "adjustment path" being outlined by the Council of the EU on basis of a European Commission proposal, taking the country-specific sustainability risks into consideration.
- Debt brake rule: Member states whose gross debt-to-GDP ratio for the general government exceeds the 60% reference level in the latest recorded fiscal year, shall reduce it at an average rate of at least one twentieth (5%) per year of the exceeded percentage points, where the calculated average period shall be either the 3‑year period covering the latest fiscal year and forecasts for the current and next year, or the latest three fiscal years. Rising debt levels for both of the rolling 3‑year periods are allowed for as long as the debt-to-GDP ratio of the member state does not exceed 60% in the latest recorded fiscal year. If the European Commission had decided the interim values in the 3‑year periods should have no direct influence on the reduction requirement at the end point of the period, then the formula would have been quite simple (i.e. for a debt-to-GDP ratio recorded to be 80% by the end of the year preceding the latest fiscal year, then it should for the period covering the latest fiscal year and the subsequent forecast two years decline with at least: 1/20 * (80%‑60%) = 1.0 percentage point per year, resulting in a limit of 77.0% three years later). However, as the European Commission decided interim values in the 3‑year periods also should impact the final debt reduction requirement, they came up with this slightly more complicated benchmark calculation formula:

- Backwards-checking formula for the debt reduction benchmark (bb_{t}):
  bb_{t} = 60% + 0.95*(b_{t-1}-60%)/3 + 0.95^{2}*(b_{t-2}-60%)/3 + 0.95^{3}*(b_{t-3}-60%)/3.
  The bb-value is the calculated benchmark limit for year t.
  The formula features three t-year-indexes for backwards-checking.
- Forwards-checking formula for the debt reduction benchmark (bb_{t+2}):
  bb_{t+2} = 60% + 0.95*(b_{t+1}-60%)/3 + 0.95^{2}*(b_{t}-60%)/3 + 0.95^{3}*(b_{t-1}-60%)/3.
  When checking forwards, the same formula is applied as the backwards-checking formula, just with all the t-year-indexes being pushed two years forward.
- The year referred to as t in the backward-looking and forward-looking formula listed above, is always the latest completed fiscal year with available outturn data. For example, a backward-check conducted in 2024 will always check whether outturn data from the completed 2023 fiscal year (t) featured a debt-to-GDP ratio (b_{t}) at a level respecting the "2023 debt reduction benchmark" (bb_{t}) calculated on basis of outturn data for the debt-to-GDP ratio from 2020+2021+2022, while the forward-looking check conducted in 2024 will be all about whether the forecast 2025-data (b_{t+2}) will respect the "2025 debt reduction benchmark" (bb_{t+2}) calculated on basis of debt-to-GDP ratio data for 2022+2023+2024. Whenever a b input-value (debt-to-GDP ratio) is recorded/forecast below 60%, its data-input shall be replaced by a fictive 60% value in the formula.
- Besides of the backward-looking debt-brake compliance check (b_{t} $\scriptscriptstyle\leq$ bb_{t}) and forward-looking debt-brake compliance check (b_{t+2} $\scriptscriptstyle\leq$ bb_{t+2}), a third cyclically adjusted backward-looking debt-brake check (b*_{t} $\scriptscriptstyle\leq$ bb_{t}) also forms part of the assessment whether or not a member state is in abeyance with the debt criterion. This check applies the same backwards-checking formula for the debt reduction bechmark (bb_{t}), but now checks if the cyclically adjusted debt-to-GDP ratio (b*_{t}) respects this calculated benchmark-limit (bb_{t}) by being compliant with the equation: b*_{t} $\scriptscriptstyle\leq$ bb_{t}. The exact formula used to calculate the cyclically adjusted debt-to-GDP ratio for the latest completed year t with outturn data (b*_{t}), is displayed by the formula box below.

Formula used to calculate the cyclically adjusted debt-to-GDP ratio for the latest year "t" with recorded data (b*_{t})
- B_{t} + C_{t} + C_{t-1} + C_{t-2}
- ^{b*_{t} =}: Y_{t-3} * (1 + Ypot_{t})(1 + P_{t}) * (1 + Ypot_{t-1})(1 + P_{t-1}) * (1 + Ypot_{t-2})(1 + P_{t-2})
- B_{t} stands for consolidated nominal gross debt of the general government in year t.; C_{t} stands for the consolidated nominal gross debt generated by the cyclical component of the general government budget balance in year t (note: As the linked AMECO data series for C_{t} only display this figure as a percentage of 2010 potential GDP at current prices, it shall of course be recalculated back to its nominal figure by multiplying it with the 2010 potential GDP).; Y_{t} stands for nominal GDP at current market prices in year t.; Ypot_{t} stands for potential growth rate in year t (table 13 in source).; P_{t} stands for the GDP price deflator rate in year t (table 15 in source).

- If just one of the four quantitative debt-requirements (including the first one requesting the debt-to-GDP ratio to be below 60% in the latest recorded fiscal year) is complied with: b_{t} $\scriptscriptstyle\leq$ 60% or b_{t} $\scriptscriptstyle\leq$ bb_{t} or b*_{t} $\scriptscriptstyle\leq$ bb_{t} or b_{t+2} $\scriptscriptstyle\leq$ bb_{t+2}, then a member state will be declared to be in abeyance with the debt brake rule. Otherwise the Commission will declare existence of an "apparent breach" of the debt-criterion by the publication of a 126(3) report, which shall investigate if the "apparent breach" was "real" after having taken a range of allowed exemptions into consideration. Provided no special "breach exemptions" can be found to exist by the 126(3) report (for example, finding the debt breach was solely caused by "structural improving pension reforms" or "payment of bailout funds to financial stability mechanisms" or "payment of national funds to the new European Fund for Strategic Investments" or by the "appearance of an EU-wide recession"), then the Commission will recommend for the Council to open a debt-breached EDP against the member state by the publication of a 126(6) report. This, however, is seen as a last resort procedure: the concept of the Fiscal Compact is that national legislation instead shall ensure that an automatic correction will be implemented immediately when such a potential 126(6) situation is detected, so that the state can manage to correct it in advance, thus avoiding for the Council to decide to open up the 126(6) debt-breached EDP against it.
- The above outlined debt brake rule already entered into force at EU level on 13 December 2011, as part of the Regulation 1177/2011 amendment of EU Regulation 1467/97 introduced by the sixpack reform. As it is also an essential part of the Fiscal Compact, the signatories are encouraged to refer to the existing version of "EU Regulation 1467/97" when they implement the rule into domestic law.
- For transitional reasons, the regulation granted all 23 EU Member States with an ongoing EDP in November 2011, a 3-year exemption period to comply with the rule, which will become applicable in the year when the member state's 2011-EDP is abrogated. For example, Ireland only was obliged to comply with the new debt brake rule in 2019, if it, as expected, would have corrected its EDP in fiscal year 2015 – with the formal EDP abrogation then taking place in 2016. During the years where the 23 member states are exempted from complying with the new debt brake rule, they were still obliged to comply with the old debt brake rule that requires the debt-to-GDP ratios in excess of 60% to be "sufficiently diminished", meaning that they must approach the 60% reference value at a "satisfactory pace" ensuring they would meet the debt reduction requirement of the new debt brake rule three years after the abrogation of the EDP. This special transitional "satisfactory pace" was calculated by the Commission individually for each of the concerned states, and was published as The annually required Minimum Linear Structural Adjustment (MLSA) of the deficit in each of the 3 years in the transition period – ensuring the compliance with the new debt brake rule by the end of the transition period.

- Automatic correction mechanism: If it becomes clear that the fiscal reality does not comply with the "balanced budget rule", which is the case when a "significant deviation" is observed from the MTO or the adjustment path towards it, then an automatic correction mechanism should be triggered. The exact implementation of this mechanism will be defined individually by each Member State, but it has to comply with the basic principles outlined in a directive published by the European Commission. This directive was published in June 2012, and outlined common principles for the role and independence of institutions (such as a Fiscal Advisory Council) responsible at the national level for monitoring the observance of the rules, which is one of the key elements to ensure that the "automatic correction mechanism" will actually work. The directive also outlined the nature, size and timeframe of the corrective action to be undertaken under normal circumstances, and how to undertake corrections for states subject to "exceptional circumstances".
  - Correction of deficit deviations: If a significant deviation (more than 0.5% of GDP) from the MTO or the adjustment path towards it, is observed on basis of an overall assessment with the structural balance as a reference (including analysis of the "expenditure benchmark"), the automatic correction mechanism shall immediately correct the situation through implementation of counter measures being effective after a short period of time, unless the deviation has been caused by "extraordinary events outside control of the Member State", including a "severe economic downturn". In June 2014, the Council endorsed the following cited method to assess whether or not "effective action" during the course of the past two years had been taken by a state with an open ongoing EDP, which is checked to assess if the state implemented its required "adjustment path towards respecting its MTO" or should have implemented additional corrective measures through its automatic correction mechanism during the period: The assessment starts by comparing the headline deficit target and the recommended improvement in the structural balance, as notified by the latest Council recommendation to the state, with the headline deficit and the apparent fiscal effort measured by the change in structural budget balance. If not achieved, the Commission will carry out a "careful analysis" based on (1) a top-down assessment of the adjusted change of the structural balance (adjusting for: (i) the impact of revisions in potential GDP growth compared with the growth scenario underpinning the Council recommendation, (ii) the impact of revenue windfalls/shortfalls relative to the ones used in the baseline scenario, and (iii) the negative impact of the changeover to ESA 2010 on the cost of tax credits) and (2) a bottom-up assessment of the consolidation measures undertaken by the authorities for the period in concern (which differs from the adjusted top-down assessment by calculating the structural adjustment effort unaffected by potential changes in public debt interest rates and potential changes of the GDP deflator – compared to the forecast figures utilized by the baseline scenario in the previous 126(7) report calling for "effective action to end an excessive deficit"). In the event that both (1)+(2) return a shortfall for the targeted structural deficit improvements, the state will be deemed not to have implemented the required amount of corrective measures, equal to the launch of a 126(9) report requiring immediate effective action to be taken to make up for the recorded shortfall.

If a Member State ahead of the entry into force of the treaty, had a structural deficit in excess of its MTO, such state will not be required immediately to correct this down to its MTO-limit, but must comply with the "adjustment path" towards reaching their country-specific MTO, as outlined in its latest Stability/Convergence report – which is subject to approval by the European Commission and published annually in April. The adjustment path towards reaching a MTO shall at minimum entail annual structural deficit improvements of 0.5% of GDP. The MTO depicts the maximum average structural deficit per year the country can afford for the medium term, when targeting that the debt-to-GDP ratios shall be maintained below 60% throughout the next fifty years, which mean it might – due to presence of age-related demographic dividends – imply that some states are required to impose stricter surplus MTOs through decades where the pensioned elderly represents a low percentage of the population (so that the state can conduct early continuous savings to meet the challenge of increased age-related costs in some future decades) – followed by some less strict deficit MTOs through the decades where the opposite is the case.

- Economic Partnership Programmes: Member States having an Excessive Deficit Procedure (EDP) opened up after the treaty enters into force, shall submit to the commission and the council an Economic Partnership Programme (EPP) for endorsement, detailing the necessary structural reforms to ensure an effective and durable correction of their excessive deficit. This shall be done a few weeks after the EDP has been notified by a 126(6) report. If the granted EDP-deadline for correction subsequently gets extended, the state will at the same time be required to submit a new updated programme. The implementation of the programme, and the yearly budgetary plans consistent with it, are monitored not only by the state's Fiscal Advisory Council established by the treaty, but also by the commission and the council. The main instrument utilized for monitoring whether the state comply with its programme, is the National Reform Programme report, being submitted to the Commission each year in April. If a state under EDP at the same time benefits from a sovereign bailout programme, it shall not submit an EPP, as their content already will be covered by the conditional Economic Adjustment Programme report. The EAP report is updated at regular intervals, and payment of the next bailout tranches will only be conducted if it concludes that the state is still in ongoing compliance with its conditional programme.
- Debt issuance coordination: For the purpose of better coordination of the planning of national debt issuance between Member States, each state shall submit its public debt issuance plans in advance to the European Commission and the Council of the EU.
- Commitment always to support EDP recommendations: This provision only apply for eurozone states, which shall be committed when meeting in the Council format, always to support approval of the EDP-related proposals or recommendations submitted by the European Commission. However, this obligation shall not apply if a qualified majority of the eurozone states are opposed to the proposed or recommended decision.
- Embedding the "Balanced budget rule" and "Automatic correction mechanism" into domestic law: The Balanced budget rule and Automatic correction mechanism shall be embedded in the national legal system of each state at the statutory level or higher, no later than 12 months after the treaty entered into force for the state. The European Commission is responsible for monitoring this, and shall submit an evaluation report, which was first scheduled in September 2015. If any state legally bound by the fiscal provisions (Title III of the treaty) is reported to have a non-compliant implementation law, or if any ratifying state believes another state's implementation law is non-compliant after the deadline for compliance, then the Court of Justice can be asked to judge the case, and in the event of finding support for the claim it will submit an enforcement ruling setting a final deadline for compliance. If the non-compliance continues after expiry of the new extended deadline ruled by the Court of Justice, then the Court can impose a penalty of up to 0.1% of GDP against the concerned state. The fine goes to the ESM if a eurozone state is fined, or to the general EU budget if a non-eurozone state is fined.

=== Title IV – Economic policy co-ordination and convergence ===
- Coordination of policies improving competitiveness, employment, public fiscal sustainability and financial stability: All states bound by this provision shall "work jointly towards an economic policy that fosters the proper functioning of the economic and monetary union and economic growth through enhanced convergence and competitiveness". To this end, each state is required to "take the necessary actions and measures in all the areas which are essential to the proper functioning of the euro area in pursuit of the objectives of fostering competitiveness, promoting employment, contributing further to the sustainability of public finances and reinforcing financial stability". The state shall report through its annual National Reform Programme, how its economic policies comply with this provision, while the Commission and Council subsequently publish their non-legally-binding opinion if the actions taken are considered to be sufficient or insufficient. As such, this rule can be argued to be similar to the commitments in the Euro Plus Pact.
- Coordination and debate of economic reform plans: For the purpose of working towards a more closely coordinated economic policy, all major economic policy reforms a member state plans, shall be discussed ex-ante and – where appropriate – coordinated among all states bound by Title IV. Any such coordination shall involve the institutions of the European Union. To this end, a pilot project was conducted in July 2014, which recommended the design of the yet to be developed Ex Ante Coordination (EAC) framework, should be complementary to the instruments already in use as part of the European Semester, and should be based on the principle of "voluntary participation and non-binding outcome" with the output being more of an early politically approved non-binding "advisory note" put forward to the national parliament (which then can be taken into notice, as part of their process to complete and improve the design of their major economic reform in the making). As such, this rule can be argued to be similar to the earlier made commitment in the Euro Plus Pact, in which each Member State committed themselves to put any "major economic reform proposal with potential spillover effects" into a non-binding ex ante consultation with its Euro Plus partners.
- Enhanced fiscal coordination and enhanced cooperation: Contracting parties are committed "to make active use whenever appropriate and necessary" of two additional instruments:

1. "Measures specific to those Member States whose currency is the euro, as provided for in article 136 of the TFEU" (which relates to the already existing enhanced and more strict Stability and Growth Pact regulations applying only for Eurozone member states – i.e. the Two-pack regulation, as well as adoption of the part of the Broad Economic Policy Guidelines which concern the eurozone generally and only apply for Eurozone member states – based on article 121(2) of the TFEU – currently reflected by "guideline 3" of the Europe 2020 Integrated Guidelines)
2. "Enhanced cooperation, as provided for by the existing article 20 in the Treaty on European Union...on matters that are essential for the proper functioning of the euro area without undermining the internal market".

=== Title V – Governance of the Eurozone ===
- Meetings for policy governance: Title V of the treaty provides for Euro summits to take place at least twice a year, chaired by the President of the Euro summit to be appointed by Eurozone countries for a term that runs concurrent to the term of the President of the European Council. The meeting members include all heads of state or government from the Eurozone and the President of the European Commission, while the President of the European Central Bank is also invited. Agendas for the summits are limited to "questions relating to the specific responsibilities which the Contracting Parties whose currency is the euro share with regard to the single currency, other issues concerning the governance of the euro area and the rules that apply to it, and strategic orientations for the conduct of economic policies to increase convergence in the euro area." The heads of state or government from non-eurozone EU states which have ratified the treaty are also invited to take part in the meetings for agenda items related to "competitiveness for the Contracting Parties, the modification of the global architecture of the euro area and the fundamental rules that will apply to it in the future, as well as, when appropriate and at least once a year, in discussions on specific issues of implementation of this Treaty". The Eurogroup has been tasked with preparing and conducting the follow-up work between the Euro Summit meetings, and the President of the Eurogroup may also be invited to attend the Euro Summits to debrief the Leaders on this work.

The Fiscal Compact supplements pre-existing EU regulations for the Stability and Growth Pact (extended by Title III), coordination of economic policies (extended by Title IV), and governance within the EMU (Title V formalises a regulation for the existing Euro summit meetings of Eurozone members). Finally, a tie exists to the European Stability Mechanism, which requires its Member States to have ratified and implemented the Fiscal Compact into national law as a pre-condition for receiving financial support.

=== Stability and Growth Pact regulation ===
The fiscal provisions introduced by the Fiscal Compact treaty (for those states legally bound by these measures) function as an extension to the Stability and Growth Pact (SGP) regulation. The SGP regulation applies to all EU member states, and has been designed to ensure that each state's annual budgetary plans are compliant with the SGP's limits for deficit and debt (or debt reduction). Compliance is monitored by the European Commission and by the Council of the EU. As soon as a Member State is considered to breach the 3% budget deficit ceiling or does not comply with the debt-level rules, the Commission initiates an Excessive Deficit Procedure (EDP) and submits a proposal for countermeasures for the member state to correct the situation. The countermeasures will only be outlined in general, identifying the size and the timeframe of the needed corrective action to be undertaken, while taking into consideration country-specific risks for fiscal sustainability. Progress towards and respect of each specific state's Medium-Term budgetary Objective (MTO) shall be evaluated on the basis of an overall assessment with the structural balance as a reference, including an analysis of expenditure net of discretionary revenue measures. If a eurozone member state repeatedly breaches its "adjustment path" towards respecting the state's MTO and the fiscal limits outlined by the SGP, then the Commission may fine the state a percentage of its GDP. Such fines can only be rejected if the Council subsequently votes against the fine with a qualified 2/3 majority. EU member states outside the eurozone cannot be fined for breaches of the fiscal rules.

== Ratification and implementation ==
In December 2012, Finland became the twelfth eurozone state to ratify the treaty, thus triggering its entry into force on 1 January 2013. For subsequent ratifiers, entry into force is on the first day of the month following their deposit of the instrument of ratification. Slovakia became a party to the treaty on 1 February 2013, as did Hungary, Luxembourg and Sweden on 1 June 2013, Malta on 1 July 2013, Poland on 1 September 2013, the Netherlands on 1 November 2013, Bulgaria on 1 February 2014 and the last signatory Belgium on 1 April 2014. The non-eurozone countries Denmark and Romania have declared themselves to be bound in full, while Bulgaria declared itself bound by Title III. Latvia became bound by the fiscal provision on 1 January 2014 when it adopted the euro. Croatia, which acceded to the EU in July 2013, also acceded to the Fiscal Compact on 7 March 2018, as did the Czech Republic on 3 April 2019.

The ratification processes is summarised in the table below. 25 countries submitted laws for ratification of the treaty according to a standard parliamentary ratification procedure. In Cyprus, ratification was performed by a governmental decree without involving the parliament. In Ireland, a referendum was held to approve a constitutional amendment that empowered the government to ratify the treaty.

State	Signed	Conclusion date	Institution	Majority needed	In favour	Against	AB	Deposited	Ref.
Austria (Note: Eurozone member state.)	Yes	4 July 2012	Federal Council	50%	103	60	0	30 July 2012	
Austria	Yes	6 July 2012	National Council	50%	42	13	0	30 July 2012	
Austria	Yes	17 July 2012	Presidential Assent	–	Granted			30 July 2012	
Belgium	Yes	23 May 2013	Senate	50%	49	9	2	28 March 2014	
Belgium	Yes	20 June 2013	Chamber of Representatives	50%	111	23	0	28 March 2014	
Belgium	Yes	18 July 2013	Royal Assent (Federal law)	–	Granted			28 March 2014	
Belgium	Yes	20 December 2013	Walloon; Parliament / (regional) (community)	50%	54	0	1	28 March 2014	
Belgium	Yes	20 December 2013	Walloon; Parliament / (regional) (community)	50%	54	0	1	28 March 2014	
Belgium	Yes	14 October 2013	German-speaking Community	50%	19	5	0	28 March 2014	
Belgium	Yes	21 December 2013	French Community	50%	66	1	1	28 March 2014	
Belgium	Yes	20 December 2013	Brussels Regional Parliament	50%	62	10	2	28 March 2014	
Belgium	Yes	20 December 2013	Brussels United; Assembly (Note: Approval of the Brussels United Assembly is subject to an absolute majority of both language groups of the parliament (French and Dutch) voting in favour. Failing that, a second vote can be held where only one third of each language group, and a majority of the full house, is required for adoption.) / (FR language) (NL language)	50%	54	3	1	28 March 2014	
Belgium	Yes	20 December 2013	Brussels United; Assembly / (FR language) (NL language)	50%	9	7	0	28 March 2014	
Belgium	Yes	19 December 2012	Flemish; Parliament / (regional) (community)	50%	62	0	0	28 March 2014	
Belgium	Yes	19 December 2012	Flemish; Parliament / (regional) (community)	50%	64	0	0	28 March 2014	
Belgium	Yes	20 December 2013	COCOF Assembly	50%	56	3	1	28 March 2014	
Bulgaria (Note: Eurozone member state which had declared itself to be bound by Title III prior to its adoption of the euro.)	Yes	28 November 2013	National Assembly	50%	109	0	5	14 January 2014	
Bulgaria	Yes	3 December 2013	Presidential Assent	–	Granted			14 January 2014	
Croatia (Note: Eurozone member state which was not bound by Title III or Title IV prior to its adoption of the euro.)	No	26 January 2018	Parliament		114	0	10	7 March 2018	
Croatia	No	31 January 2018	Presidential Assent	–	Granted			7 March 2018	
Czech Republic	No	Did not conclude	Chamber of Deputies (Sobotka)	60% (Note: Needs the approval of a constitutional majority.)				3 April 2019	
Czech Republic	No	27 August 2014	Senate (Sobotka)	60%	58	10	5	3 April 2019	
Czech Republic	No	Did not conclude	Presidential Assent (Sobotka)	–				3 April 2019	
Czech Republic	No	1 November 2018	Chamber of Deputies (Babiš)	50%	106	43	4	3 April 2019	
Czech Republic	No	20 December 2018	Senate (Babiš)	50%	34	7	11	3 April 2019	
Czech Republic	No	6 March 2019	Presidential Assent (Babiš)	–	Granted			3 April 2019	
Cyprus	Yes	20 April 2012	Council of Ministers	–	Approved			26 July 2012	
Cyprus	Yes	29 June 2012	Presidential Assent	–	Granted			26 July 2012	
Denmark (Note: As non-eurozone member states, Denmark and Romania declared themselves fully bound by Titles III and IV, prior to their adoption of the euro. Denmark clarified in its declaration that this did not constitute any obligation to be automatically bound by any subsequent EU regulations within the scope of Title III+IV when adopted on the basis of those provisions of the EU Treaties (Article 136–138) which are only applicable to member states of the eurozone. For example, neither Romania nor Denmark, became bound by the subsequently agreed Two-pack regulation.)	Yes	31 May 2012	Folketing	50%	80	27	0	19 July 2012	
Denmark	Yes	18 June 2012	Royal Assent	–	Granted			19 July 2012	
Estonia	Yes	17 October 2012	Riigikogu	50%	63	0	0	5 December 2012	
Estonia	Yes	5 November 2012	Presidential Assent	–	Granted			5 December 2012	
Finland	Yes	18 December 2012	Parliament	50%	139	38	1	21 December 2012	
Finland	Yes	21 December 2012	Presidential Assent	–	Granted			21 December 2012	
France	Yes	11 October 2012	Senate	50% (Note: The French constitutional court ruled that a constitutional amendment was not required to ratify the treaty, meaning that the French parliament could approve it with a simple majority.)	307 (91%)	32 (9%)	8	26 November 2012	
France	Yes	9 October 2012	National Assembly	50%	477 (87%)	70 (13%)	21	26 November 2012	
France	Yes	22 October 2012	Presidential Assent	–	Granted			26 November 2012	
Germany	Yes	29 June 2012	Bundesrat	66.7%	65	0	4	27 September 2012	
Germany	Yes	29 June 2012	Bundestag	66.7%	491	111	6	27 September 2012	
Germany	Yes	13 September 2012	Presidential Assent	–	Granted			27 September 2012	
Greece	Yes	28 March 2012	Parliament	50%	194	59	0	10 May 2012	
Hungary	Yes	25 March 2013	National Assembly	66.7%	307	32	13	15 May 2013	
Hungary	Yes	29 March 2013	Presidential Assent	–	Granted			15 May 2013	
Ireland	Yes	20 April 2012	Dáil	50%	93	21	N/A	14 December 2012	
Ireland	Yes	24 April 2012	Senate	50%	Approved			14 December 2012	
Ireland	Yes	31 May 2012	Referendum	50%	60.3%	39.7%	N/A	14 December 2012	
Ireland	Yes	27 June 2012	Presidential Assent	–	Granted			14 December 2012	
Italy	Yes	12 July 2012	Senate	66.7%	216	24	21	14 September 2012	
Italy	Yes	19 July 2012	Chamber of Deputies	66.7%	368	65	65	14 September 2012	
Italy	Yes	23 July 2012	Presidential Assent	–	Granted			14 September 2012	
Latvia	Yes	31 May 2012	Parliament	66.7% (Note: A vote with 2/3 constitutional majority of present MPs was needed, as the treaty delegated a part of the national competencies to International institutions.)	67 (69%)	29 (30%)	1 (1%)	22 June 2012	
Latvia	Yes	13 June 2012	Presidential Assent	–	Granted			22 June 2012	
Lithuania	Yes	28 June 2012	Seimas	50% and min. 57 yes votes	80	11	21	6 September 2012	
Lithuania	Yes	4 July 2012	Presidential Assent	–	Granted			6 September 2012	
Luxembourg	Yes	27 February 2013	Chamber of Deputies	66.7% (Note: The Council of State of Luxembourg advised the parliament that even though the treaty's ratification did not require any changes to the constitution, it should still be approved by a 2/3 majority in parliament, as new powers – related to the validity check of enacted "implementation laws" – were transferred from the national level to the Commission and Court of Justice of the European Union. The responsible parliamentary Committee for Finances and the Budget decided in line with the Council of State's advice for a 2/3 majority for reasons of legal certainty of the law.)	46	10	0	8 May 2013	
Luxembourg	Yes	29 March 2013	Grand Ducal Assent	–	Granted			8 May 2013	
Malta	Yes	11 June 2013	House of Representatives	50%	Unanimously			28 June 2013	
Netherlands	Yes	25 June 2013	Senate	50%	Approved without vote (Note: It was formally noted (Dutch: Aantekening verleend) that the SP (8 of the 75 seats) would have voted against the proposal, had there been a vote.)			8 October 2013	
Netherlands	Yes	26 March 2013	House of Representatives	50%	112	33	0	8 October 2013	
Netherlands	Yes	26 June 2013	Royal Assent	–	Granted			8 October 2013	
Poland	Yes	20 February 2013	Sejm	50% (Note: As none of the Fiscal Compact provisions result in transfer of state authority competence to international organisations (EU) or international institutions (EU institutions), while the implementation into national law is possible without changing the Polish constitution, the ratification will only requirer a passing by simple majority in both chambers of the parliament.)	282	155	1	8 August 2013	
Poland	Yes	21 February 2013	Senate	50%	57	26	0	8 August 2013	
Poland	Yes	24 July 2013	Presidential Assent	–	Granted			8 August 2013	
Portugal	Yes	13 April 2012	Assembly	50%	204	24	2	5 July 2012	
Portugal	Yes	27 June 2012	Presidential Assent	–	Granted			5 July 2012	
Romania	Yes	21 May 2012	Senate	50% (Note: The constitution requires all EU treaties to be passed with a two-thirds absolute majority in a joint session by the Senate and House of Representatives. As the Fiscal Compact was an intergovernmental treaty without provisions requirering a change of the constitution, it was however sufficient to ratify the treaty by votes with simple majority, in both chambers.)	89	1	0	6 November 2012	
Romania	Yes	8 May 2012	House of Representatives	50%	237	0	2	6 November 2012	
Romania	Yes	13 June 2012	Presidential Assent	–	Granted			6 November 2012	
Slovakia	Yes	18 December 2012	National Council	50% (absolute) min.76 yes votes (Note: According to the Slovak procedural evaluation report, the treaty was voted for according to §86d and had been evaluated to be a §7(4) treaty. Hence, as regulated by the Slovak constitution §84(3), it only called for a 50% majority of parliament members to get passed.)	138	0	2	17 January 2013	
Slovakia	Yes	11 January 2013	Presidential Assent	–	Granted			17 January 2013	
Slovenia	Yes	19 April 2012	National Assembly	50%	74	0	2	30 May 2012	
Slovenia	Yes	30 April 2012	Presidential Assent	–	Granted			30 May 2012	
Spain	Yes	18 July 2012	Senate	50%	240	4	1	27 September 2012	
Spain	Yes	21 June 2012	Congress of Deputies	50%	309	19	1	27 September 2012	
Spain	Yes	25 July 2012	Royal Assent	–	Granted			27 September 2012	
Sweden	Yes	7 March 2013	Riksdagen	50%	251	23	37	3 May 2013	

= Eurozone parties bound by all treaty provisions
= Non-eurozone parties bound by all treaty provisions
= Non-eurozone parties not bound by any of the fiscal or economic provisions

=== Ratification process ===
After a country has completed its domestic ratification, it must deposit an instrument of ratification with the depositary (the General Secretariat of the Council of the European Union) to complete the process. If a legal complaint is filed with a constitutional court, this can delay the deposit and ratification, or even stop it if the court upholds the complaint. The list below summarises the progress of the ratification process.

- Belgium: On 14 March 2012 a motion was submitted to the Chamber of Representatives by members of the opposition calling for a referendum on the treaty. A similar motion was submitted to the Senate on 9 May, but a referendum was ultimately not held.
- Croatia: With their accession to the EU on 1 July 2013, Croatia became eligible to accede to the Fiscal Compact, which they did in March 2018.
- Czech Republic: The Czech government did not sign the treaty in 2012, in part due to objections to the increased liabilities and that non-eurozone states were not granted observer status at all Eurogroup and Euro-summit meetings. Then Czech Prime Minister Petr Nečas also argued that there was no moral obligation for net-paying, fiscally sound countries outside the Eurozone, such as the Czech Republic, to ratify the fiscal responsibility treaty. There was also uncertainty over the domestic ratification process, with then President Václav Klaus, a staunch eurosceptic, stating that he would not give his assent to the treaty. However, Nečas stated that his country may join in the future. During the treaty negotiations, the Civic Democratic Party (ODS), which Nečas led, suggested that a referendum should decide whether the country ratified the treaty, while their junior coalition partner, TOP 09, opposed the idea and wanted only parliamentary approval for the treaty.

In January 2013, Top 09 stated that they would only sign a revised coalition agreement for the remainder of the government's term if its partners, ODS and LIDEM, agreed to accede to the fiscal compact by the end of 2013. ODS rejected this ultimatum and stated that a constitutional amendment implementing the Fiscal Compact's debt and deficit provisions should be approved before ratifying the Fiscal Compact. The opposition Social Democratic Party (ČSSD) announced that they would support the Financial Constitution on 5 conditions, one of which was the ratification of the Fiscal Compact. After Jiří Rusnok took over as caretaker Prime Minister following a government corruption scandal, he stated that a decision on the Czech Republic ratifying the Fiscal Compact would not be made until after parliamentary elections scheduled for October.

President Miloš Zeman, who took over in March 2013 after winning the January presidential election, supported the Czech Republic's accession to the Fiscal Compact, although not before they join the Eurozone, which he believed shouldn't occur before 2017. Following the parliamentary election, ČSSD, ANO and KDU-ČSL formed a coalition government which agreed to ratify the Fiscal Compact. ČSSD Prime Minister Bohuslav Sobotka supports ratifying the treaty, and his party has opposed holding a referendum on it. The opposition Top 09 party's election campaign called for parliamentary ratification of the Fiscal Compact as soon as possible. In late February 2014, Sobotka's government committed to starting the ratification of the Fiscal Compact within two months. Sobotka expected that ratification would be finalized within eight months. The cabinet approved accession to the Fiscal Compact on 23 March 2014, and the bill was introduced to the Chamber of Deputies on 11 April. The bill called for accession without a declaration on the full application of all treaty titles immediately, meaning that only Title V will apply until the state adopts the euro. To be approved, the bill needed the consent of a constitutional majority of 60% in both houses of parliament and a final consent of the Czech president.

The Czech senate approved accession to the treaty on 27 August 2014. However, the governing parties did not have sufficient votes in the Chamber of Deputies to have the bill passed alone, and required the support of TOP 09. While TOP 09 supports the Fiscal Compact, they have said they would only support ratification if the Czech Republic declares itself bound by all provisions of the treaty immediately, rather than once they adopt the euro. In February 2015 the Czech government introduced bills which would enact some provisions of the Fiscal Compact into Czech law. A constitutional amendment was also proposed to embed the provisions in the Czech constitution. At the first reading of the constitutional fiscal responsibility bill, TOP 09 notified the ruling coalition that it would only support the constitutional bill if the Czech Republic's ratification of Fiscal Compact included a declaration for full Title III and IV commitments. The bills, but not the constitutional amendment, were approved by the Chamber in October 2016.

On 14 February 2018, the Andrej Babiš' First Cabinet, which took over following elections in October 2017, approved the Fiscal Compact and sent it to the Chamber of Deputies. The bill proposes that the Czech Republic accede without making a declaration to be bound by Titles III or IV. Following approval of ratification of the treaty by the Chamber of Deputies and Senate, President Zeman signed a letter of accession to the treaty on 6 March 2019.

- France: French President François Hollande promised during the 2012 presidential election campaign that he would only ratify the Fiscal Compact if the European Council agreed to a supplemental "Growth Pact". After the Compact for Growth and Jobs was adopted on 29 June 2012, the combined Fiscal Compact and Growth Pact bill, having received the support of the French government and president, was passed by both chambers of the National Assembly.
- Germany: Ratification was stalled following a complaint to the Federal Constitutional Court on the consistency of the Fiscal Compact with the German Basic Law. However, on 12 September 2012 the court rejected all applications for injunctions against ratification of the treaty, and on 18 March the court released their decision which found that all the complaints against the Fiscal Compact were either inadmissible or unfounded.
- Ireland: A constitutional amendment, which authorised the government to ratify the Fiscal Compact, was approved by a referendum. However, the government opted to wait until the Fiscal Responsibility Bill 2012, which implemented the provisions required by the treaty into national law, was passed before formally completing their ratification of the treaty.
- Poland: 20 members of parliament submitted a proposal on 31 January 2012 calling on the parliament to schedule a referendum on the ratification of the Fiscal Compact, but the proposal was never voted on. On 5 December, the bill to ratify the Fiscal Compact was submitted to the parliament with an attached legal evaluation stating that ratification only required a simple majority for approval in both chambers, rather than the constitutional 2/3 majority. In March, Sejm parliamentarians from the opposition Law and Justice (PiS) party challenged the ratification of the Fiscal Compact with the Constitutional Tribunal of the Republic of Poland, listing 14 violations of the Polish Constitution. They argued that ratification of the Compact required a two-thirds majority and that the text of the treaty is incompatible with the constitution. A separate challenge was filed by PiS Senators in early April claiming that they were not given sufficient time to consider ratification of the Compact, though it was subsequently combined with the original case by the court. On 21 May 2013, the Tribunal rejected both challenges on procedural grounds, arguing that the treaty had not been fully ratified by Poland, and thus its constitutionality could not yet be challenged and judged.

=== Entry into force, applicability and implementation ===
The provisions regarding governance (Title V) are applicable to all signatories since the treaty's entry into force on 1 January 2013. For eurozone members that ratify, the treaty applies in full, pursuant to article 14. Non-eurozone countries will automatically become bound by all treaty provisions the moment they adopt the euro. Prior to that, only Title V applies to them, unless they by their own initiative make a declaration to the depositary "to be bound at an earlier date by all or part of the provisions in Titles III and IV".

The applicability of the treaty's provisions to each country is summarized in the table below. The last column of the table reflects the status of compliant implementation laws, and denotes whether the Title III provisions (the "balanced budget rule" and "automatic correction mechanism") have been embedded into national legislation through an ordinary law subject to later revisions by simple majority, or also by a constitutional amendment of which later revisions will require a higher constitutional majority. The background color of the last column indicates whether or not the implementation law of the state is compliant with Title III, where green indicates compliance, while yellow and red indicate that existing national fiscal rules are non-compliant. As of January 2015, the compliance assessments are only based on unofficial sources and/or assessments made by a parliamentary committee of the concerned state. The first official independent assessment of the treaty compliance of the listed national implementation laws has been scheduled to be conducted by the European Commission in September 2015, for each of the states bound by the fiscal provisions (Title III).

The European Commission adopted in February 2017 a report on the transposition across the 22 Member States concerned

State	Sections applied	Governance provisions (Title V) effective	Fiscal and economic provisions (Titles III and IV) effective	Implementation law for enforcement of Title III provisions
Austria	Full (eurozone)	1 January 2013	1 January 2013	Ordinary law (simple majority)
Belgium	Full (eurozone)	1 January 2013 (Note: According to Article 14 (4), Title V applied to all signatory states from 1 January 2013, the date the treaty entered into force. All other titles only applied to states once they had ratified the treaty, as per Article 14 (3).)	1 April 2014	Ordinary law (simple majority)
Bulgaria	Full (eurozone)	1 January 2013	1 January 2014 (Title III) (Note: As a non-eurozone member state, Bulgaria declared itself bound by Title III, prior to its adoption of the euro.) 1 January 2026 (Title IV) (Note: On 1 January 2026, Bulgaria adopted the euro and automatically became bound by Title IV (the treaty in its entirety), according to Article 14 (5).)	Ordinary law (simple majority)
Croatia	Full (eurozone)	7 March 2018	1 January 2023 (Note: On 1 January 2023, Croatia adopted the euro and automatically became bound by Title III+IV (the treaty in its entirety), according to Article 14 (5).)	
Cyprus	Full (eurozone)	1 January 2013	1 January 2013	Ordinary law (simple majority)
Czech Republic	Title V	3 April 2019	No	Ordinary law (simple majority, not required until euro adoption)
Denmark	Full (declaration)	1 January 2013	1 January 2013 (Note: As non-eurozone member states, Denmark and Romania declared themselves fully bound by Titles III and IV, prior to their adoption of the euro. Denmark clarified in its declaration, that this did not constitute any obligation to be automatically bound by any subsequent EU regulations within the scope of Title III+IV when adopted on the basis of those provisions of the EU Treaties (Article 136–138) which are only applicable to member states of the eurozone. For example, neither Romania nor Denmark, became bound by the subsequently agreed Two-pack regulation.)	Ordinary law (simple majority)
Estonia	Full (eurozone)	1 January 2013	1 January 2013	Ordinary law (simple majority)
Finland	Full (eurozone)	1 January 2013	1 January 2013	Ordinary law (simple majority)
France	Full (eurozone)	1 January 2013	1 January 2013	Organic law (simple majority)
Germany	Full (eurozone)	1 January 2013	1 January 2013	Constitutional law
Greece	Full (eurozone)	1 January 2013	1 January 2013	Ordinary law (simple majority)
Hungary	Title V	1 January 2013	No	Constitutional law
Ireland	Full (eurozone)	1 January 2013	1 January 2013	Ordinary law (simple majority)
Italy	Full (eurozone)	1 January 2013	1 January 2013	Constitutional law
Latvia	Full (eurozone)	1 January 2013	1 January 2014 (Note: On 1 January 2014, Latvia adopted the euro and automatically became bound by Title III+IV (the treaty in its entirety), according to Article 14 (5).)	Ordinary law (simple majority)
Lithuania	Full (eurozone)	1 January 2013	1 January 2015 (Note: On 1 January 2015, Lithuania adopted the euro and automatically became bound by Title III+IV (the treaty in its entirety), according to Article 14 (5).)	Constitutional law (entered into force 1 January 2015) (Note: Lithuania transposed the TSCG into its constitution, replacing its ordinary "Law on Fiscal Discipline" with effect from its euro adoption on 1 January 2015.)
Luxembourg	Full (eurozone)	1 January 2013	1 June 2013	Ordinary law (simple majority)
Malta	Full (eurozone)	1 January 2013	1 July 2013	Ordinary law (simple majority)
Netherlands	Full (eurozone)	1 January 2013	1 November 2013	Ordinary law (simple majority)
Portugal	Full (eurozone)	1 January 2013	1 January 2013	Organic law (2/3 supermajority)
Poland	Title V	1 January 2013	No	No (not required until euro adoption)
Romania	Full (declaration)	1 January 2013	1 January 2013	Ordinary law
Slovakia	Full (eurozone)	1 January 2013	1 February 2013	Constitutional law (and implementation law for the constitutional amendment)
Slovenia	Full (eurozone)	1 January 2013	1 January 2013	Constitutional law
Spain	Full (eurozone)	1 January 2013	1 January 2013	Constitutional law
Sweden	Title V	1 January 2013	No	No (not required until euro adoption)

== Fiscal compliance ==
The compliance of last years fiscal account and the equally important forecast fiscal accounts, with the criteria set by the Fiscal Compact, is summarized for each EU member state in the table below. The figures stem from the economic forecast published by the European Commission in November 2018, basing its forecast figures on the government's already implemented fiscal budget law 2018 and its recently proposed fiscal budget law for 2019. Non-exempted breaches of either the deficit or debt criteria in the Stability and Growth Pact (SGP), will lead the commission to open up an Excessive Deficit Procedure (EDP) against the state through the publication of a 126(6) report, in which a deadline to rectify the issue is set – along with the request for the state to submit a compliant fiscal recovery and reform plan (referred to as an Economic Partnership Programme – or alternatively an Economic Adjustment Programme if the state receives a sovereign bailout). All current EDP deadlines are listed in the last column of the table.

The table also list each member states' Medium-Term budgetary Objective (MTO) for its structural balance, and its current target year for achieving this MTO. Until the MTO has been achieved, all states are obliged to adhere to an adjustment path towards this country-specific target, where the structural balance must improve at least 0.5% points per year. The MTO depicts the most adverse structural balance per year the country can afford, when targeting that debt-to-GDP ratios first decline to below 60% and subsequently remain stable below this level for the next 50 years while adjusting for the forecast change of aging related costs. Beside existence of the debt dependent minimum limits for the MTO dictated by the Fiscal Compact, there is also existence of two other calculated minimum limits for the MTO determined by a formula ensuring respectively "a safety margin to respect the nominal 3%-limit during economic downturns" and "long-term sustainability of public finances taking into account the forecast for future adverse aging related costs". The final country-specific MTO minimum limit will be determined as the one respecting all of the three determined minimum limits (note: those non-eurozone states neither having entered ERM-II nor ratified a submission to Title III of the Fiscal Compact, are only required to respect the first two calculated minimum limits), and this final limit will be recalculated by the European Commission once every third year (most recently in October 2012). Subsequently, and as a final step, each state have the prerogative still to set its MTO at a level being stricter than the one calculated by the European Commission, but can not set it at a limit being worse. The states will communicate their final MTO selection in their annual Stability and Convergence Report, in which the attached target year for obtaining the selected MTO will also be revealed/updated according to the latest macroeconomic developments and success of the previously implemented fiscal policies by the concerned state.

Green rows in the table reflect full compliance with the Fiscal Compact criteria, requiring the state to have achieved its MTO for the entire 2015–17 period. Yellow rows represent compliance with only the Stability and Growth Pact (SGP), as the state is still on an adjustment path to respect its MTO at a midterm horizon. Red rows reflect an "apparent breach" of the SGP's EDP-criteria (nominal debt/deficit rules), which as minimum will merit the publication of a 126(3) report to investigate if the "apparent breach" was "real" (with an EDP finally only opened against the state by the launch of a 126(6) report, if the breach was found to be "real" by the 126(3) report).

Fiscal compliance in 2018–20 (assessed Nov 2019)	Debt-to-GDP ratio (in 2018)	Budget balance (worst figure in 2018–20)	Structural balance (worst figure in 2018–20)	MTO for structural balance (compliance checked for 2013–15)	Bailout program (approved by EC)	Deadline for EDP adjustment (as of 10 November 2019)
Fiscal compliance in 2018–20 (assessed Nov 2019)	max. 60.0% (or declining at sufficient pace)	max. -3.0%	min. -0.5% (or −1% if debt<60%)	MTO achieved (or adjustment path obeyed)	Bailout program (approved by EC)	Deadline for EDP adjustment (as of 10 November 2019)
Austria	74.0% (back-+forward-compliant)^{C}	0.2%	-0.3%	-0.5% in 2018	No	No EDP (since 2014)
Belgium	100.0% (decline in 2018–19)	-2.0%	-2.4%	0.75% in 2016	No	No EDP (since 2014)
Bulgaria	22.3%	0.9%	0.6%	-0.5% in 2017	No	No EDP (since 2012)
Croatia^{R}	74.8% (back-+forward-compliant)^{C}	0.0%	-1.0%	N/A	No	No EDP (since 2017)
Cyprus^{T}	100.6% (decline in 2019–20)	-4.4%	0.6%	0.0% in 2032	Yes (expired 2016)^{3}	No EDP (since 2016)
Czech Republic^{R}	32.6%	-0.1%	-0.4%	No (−1.0% in 202X)	No	No EDP (since 2014)
Denmark	34.2%	0.5%	1.0%	-0.5% since 2011	No	No EDP (since 2014)
Estonia	8.4%	-0.6%	-2.2%	0.0% in 2015	No	Never had an EDP
Finland	59.0%	-1.4%	-1.6%	-0.5% in 2014	No	No EDP (since 2011)
France^{T}	98.4% (no decline)	-3.1%	-2.7%	0.0% in 2019	No	No EDP (since 2018)
Germany	61.9% (back-+forward-compliant)^{C}	0.6%	0.7%	Yes (−0.5% MTO achieved since 2012)	No	No EDP (since 2012)
Greece^{T}	181.2% (decline in 2019–20)	1.0%	1.8%	N/A	Yes (expired 2018)^{3}	No EDP (since 2017)
Hungary^{R}	70.2% (back-+forward-compliant)^{C}	-2.3%	-3.8%	-1.7% since 2012	Yes (expired 2010)^{2}	No EDP (since 2013)
Ireland	63.6% (back-+forward-compliant)^{C}	0.1%	-0.8%	0.0% in 2019	Yes (expired 2013)^{3}	No EDP (since 2016)
Italy	134.8% (no decline)	-2.3%	-2.5%	0.0% in 2016	No	No EDP (since 2013)
Latvia	36.4%	-0.7%	-1.9%	-0.5% in 2019	Yes (expired 2011)^{2}	No EDP (since 2013)
Lithuania	34.1%	0.0%	-1.6%	-1.0% in 2015	No	No EDP (since 2013)
Luxembourg	21.0%	1.4%	0.8%	0.5% in 2013	No	Never had an EDP
Malta^{T}	46.8%	1.0%	0.5%	0.0% in 2017	No	No EDP (since 2015)
Netherlands	52.4%	0.5%	0.2%	-0.5% in 2018	No	No EDP (since 2014)
Poland^{R}	48.9%	-1.0%	-2.2%	-1.0% in 2018	No	No EDP (since 2015)
Portugal^{T}	122.2% (transitional-compliant)^{C}	-0.4%	-0.6%	-0.5% in 2015	Yes (expired 2014)^{3}	No EDP (since 2017)
Romania	35.0%	-4.4%	-4.4%	-1.0% in 2014	Yes (expired 2015)^{2}	No EDP (since 2013)
Slovakia	49.4%	-1.2%	-1.8%	-0.5% in 2022	No	No EDP (since 2014)
Slovenia^{T}	70.4% (back-+forward-compliant)^{C}	0.5%	-1.0%	-0.5% in 2017	No	No EDP (since 2016)
Spain^{T}	97.6% (decline in 2018–20)	-2.5%	-3.2%	0.0% in 2026	No	No EDP (since 2019)
Sweden^{R}	38.8%	0.1%	0.2%	-1.0% since 2011	No	Never had an EDP

^{1} Did not sign the Fiscal Compact. ^{2} EU 'balance of payments' programme. ^{3} ESM/EFSM/EFSF programme. ^{R} Ratified, but not bound by fiscal provisions (Title III).
^{T} Transitional states, only required to have a declining debt-to-GDP ratio to the extent of ensuring full debt-criterion compliance by the end of their 3-year transition period following EDP abrogation.
^{C} Compliance: see Content/Title III/Debt brake – back: b_{2015} $\scriptscriptstyle\leq$ bb_{2015} – forward: b_{2017} $\scriptscriptstyle\leq$ bb_{2017} – transitional: fulfills old debt brake for each year of transition period.

The noted ongoing EDPs will be abrogated, as soon as the concerned state for the period encompassing the last completed fiscal year (based on final notified data) and for the current and next year (based on forecast data), succeeds in delivering a general government account in full compliance with the SGP's deficit criteria (budget deficit no more than 3.0% of GDP) and the debt criterion (debt‑to‑GDP ratio below 60% – or sufficiently declining towards this level). The deadlines for EDP abrogations will only be extended if extraordinary circumstances occur – like a recession or severe economic downturn. As part of the increased surveillance efforts introduced by the Sixpack, all EDP's are now evaluated three times per year, based upon data from the commission's economic outlook reports published in February, May and November. Member states involved in bailout programs are evaluated even more frequently and more in depth, through the so-called "Programme Reviews". EDP abrogations are normally announced in June, as they always await final notified data for the last completed fiscal year (being published in early May), but can occasionally also be announced later in the year (due to later arriving positive data revisions for recorded data or subsequent improvements materializing for its forecast data). The SGP and Fiscal Compact feature identical debt criteria, so they only differ compliance wise for the deficit criteria, where the Fiscal Compact sets the additional structural deficit criteria to be met as a main criteria (elevating its importance from the additional but less binding MTO adjustment path criteria).

The debt-criterion has due to transitional reasons been split into three different requirements, being in place since the sixpack reform was implemented in November 2011. For states aspiring to have their ongoing 2011‑EDP abrogated based on compliance with the debt-criterion, this will require they deliver a declining debt-to-GDP ratio for the last year in the forecast horizon, which was even changed to "no declining requirement at all" – as per the latest revised procedure published in 2013. The second debt-criterion is the so-called "transitional criteria", applying for states with an abrogated 2011‑EDP throughout a three-year transition period, in which the debt ratio is required to decline steadily towards full compliance with the debt brake benchmark rule by the end of the transition period – by annual improvements equal to the calculated Minimum Linear Structural Adjustment (MLSA) of its general government deficit. Finally in the fourth year after the 2011‑EDP has been abrogated, all transitional states will be assessed for compliance with the normal "debt brake benchmark rule" (which also apply towards states that never had a 2011‑EDP).

The new "debt brake benchmark rule" require the state to deliver, either for the three year backward-looking or cyclically adjusted backward-looking or forward-looking period, an annual debt-to-GDP ratio decrease of at least 5% of the benchmark value in excess of the 60% limit. As Germany and Malta both had their 2011‑EDP abrogated in 2012, these two states will need to comply with the "debt brake benchmark rule" starting from Fiscal Year 2014, with their first official debt-reduction evaluation expected to be published shortly after the year has ended – and at the latest when the Commission publish its assessment of the next Stability Programmes of the member states in May 2015. Among the member states with a debt-to-GDP ratio above 60% in 2013, Croatia was the first one being required to comply with the new "debt brake benchmark rule" in January 2014, where the European Commission concluded no compliance was found, due to both its debt-to-GDP ratio and cyclically adjusted debt-to-GDP ratio exceeding its calculated backward-looking benchmark limit in 2013 (75.7% $\scriptscriptstyle\nleq$ 61.4% and 71.3%* $\scriptscriptstyle\nleq$ 61.4%) and due to its forecast forward-looking debt-to-GDP ratio exceeding its calculated benchmark limit in 2015 (84.9% $\scriptscriptstyle\nleq$ 72.9%).

== See also ==
- Euro Plus Pact
- European Stability Mechanism
- Fiscal policies in the Eurozone
- Enhanced co-operation
- Fiscal federalism
- Sixpack (EU)
- List of acronyms associated with the eurozone crisis
