= Macroeconomic Imbalance Procedure =

Part of the EU's "Sixpack" legislation

The Macroeconomic Imbalance Procedure (MIP) is a set of European Union regulations designed to prevent and correct risky macroeconomic developments within EU member states, such as high current account deficits, unsustainable external indebtedness and housing bubbles. It was introduced by the EU in autumn 2011 amidst the economic and financial crisis, and entered into force on 13 December 2011. The MIP is part of the EU's "Sixpack" legislation, which aims to reinforce the monitoring and surveillance of macroeconomic policies in the EU and the euro area.

== Procedure ==
The first step of each yearly round of the MIP is the Alert Mechanism Report prepared by the European Commission. Based on a scoreboard of indicators, which are not interpreted mechanically, the Commission identifies the countries and issues which require In-Depth Reviews for further economic analysis. The Commission also takes into account relevant data beyond the scope of the scoreboard, when selecting countries for in-depth reviews. Based on these in-depth reviews, the Commission determines if imbalances exist; what the nature of the imbalances is; and judges whether they are persistent, aggravating or unwinding. Depending on the severity of the imbalances the Commission proposes a policy recommendation under either the 'preventive arm' or the 'corrective arm' of the MIP.

In the case of countries where an imbalance exists, but is not of an excessive nature, the follow-up to the in-depth review will take place under the preventive arm of the MIP. It is embedded in the European Semester (the EU's yearly cycle of economic policy coordination). This means that the MIP-relevant recommendation will be integrated in the package of proposals for Country-Specific Recommendations, which aim to provide guidance for national policy making.

If the Commission in their In-Depth Review find existence of an excessive imbalance, this might subsequently trigger an Excessive Imbalance Procedure (EIP) under the corrective arm of the MIP. The Commission's decision will be taken in the context of the additional analysis of the "National Reform Programme" and "Stability/Convergence Programme" submitted in April. If the Commission on this basis find the excessive imbalance soon will be mitigated by implementation of effective counter measures, they will refrain to open up an EIP, but the state will still be subject to "a specific and close monitoring of policy implementation" by a separate status report issued a half year later, which will conduct a real-time assessment of implemented action and establish peer pressure towards ensuring the promised reform action is taken by the Member State in concern. On the other hand, if an excessive imbalance that jeopardises the proper functioning of the Economic and Monetary Union is still found to exist by the end of the European Semester, not being properly rectified by the submitted programmes, the Commission will then (upon the same time of its publication of Country-Specific Recommendations) forward a special procedural recommendation to the Council for opening up an EIP. If the Council at its subsequent meeting decides to follow the Commission's recommendation to open up an EIP, the member state concerned will then have to submit a "corrective action plan" to the Council and Commission within a short notice, featuring a detailed roadmap for all specific policy actions with specific deadlines for implementing adequate measures satisfying the received Council recommendation. Surveillance will subsequently be stepped up by the Commission through regular progress reports drawn up by the member state concerned. The enforcement of the Excessive Imbalance Procedure is backed by sanctions for euro area member states (up to 0.1% of GDP), if they repeatedly fail to take agreed action or to deliver a sufficient "corrective action plan".

Since the entry into force of the EIP regulation on 13 December 2011, the Council however never has launched any Excessive Imbalance Procedure. Two main reasons exist for no launched EIP's. The first reason, was that all of the seven states identified to have excessive imbalance through 2013–15, succeeded to present sufficient counter measures when submitting their next year reform programme. The second reason, was that the most fragile and imbalanced "Programme countries" at the height of their imbalances received macroeconomic financial support from EFSM/EFSF/ESM/IMF or the EU Balance of Payments Programme, and thus were not covered at all by the Macroeconomic Imbalance Procedure and the Excessive Imbalance Procedure (instead being tightly monitored by their macroeconomic financial assistance programme). In 2013 the list of "Programme countries" included: Cyprus, Greece, Ireland, Portugal and Romania. In comparison, Spain was not considered to be a "Programme country" in 2013, due to only receiving financial assistance for bank recapitalizations and not any macroeconomic financial assistance.

== Implementation ==
The Macroeconomic Imbalance Procedure was triggered the first time with the publication of the Alert Mechanism Report in February 2012. Based on the analysis in the report, the European Commission carried out in-depth reviews for twelve EU member states. The countries included were: Belgium, Bulgaria, Cyprus, Denmark, Finland, France, Italy, Hungary, Slovenia, Spain, Sweden and the United Kingdom. The analysis confirmed that these EU member states faced macroeconomic imbalances of different nature. But none were considered excessive, therefore no Excessive Imbalance Procedure was launched. The 'preventive arm' of the MIP was however activated, with the recommended policy responses to the imbalances being integrated in the set of Country-Specific Recommendations addressed to member states under the European Semester. These recommendations were endorsed by the European Council in June and subsequently adopted by the Council of Ministers in July 2012.

On 28 November 2012 the second Alert Mechanism Report was published. Based on the report, the Commission decided to review the progress in all of the twelve member states initially reviewed in 2012. They were therefore all selected again for an In-Depth Review. In addition, the Commission also started in-depth reviews for Malta and the Netherlands. On 10 April 2013, the Commission published the in-depth reviews and concluded that excessive imbalances exist in Spain and Slovenia. At its meeting on 14 May 2013, the Council of the European Union however stated that the European Commission should first review the national reform programmes of these countries, and on this basis it would then be assessed whether additional policy measures were necessary. The Slovenian Prime Minister stated on 23 May:

We have the feeling the Commission believes submitting us to this [Excessive Imbalance] procedure will be a help to our country. This is not the case, in my estimate, and I believe it would be much better that Slovenia can on its own without any supervision resolve its problems.

On 29 May 2013, after the national reform programmes of Spain and Slovenia had been reviewed, the Commission found those programmes to be sufficient; and thus refrained from launching an Excessive Imbalance Procedure towards Spain and Slovenia.

In the third Alert Mechanism Report published in November 2013, the Commission announced a new round of in-depth reviews for the countries already under scrutiny, but widened these reviews to Germany, Croatia, and Luxembourg, as well as to Ireland immediately after exit from its assistance programme. In March 2014, the Commission concluded that it found no imbalances in Denmark, Malta and Luxembourg, while the remaining countries were experiencing imbalances. Imbalances in Spain were not considered excessive any more. Imbalances in Italy, Croatia, and Slovenia were however experienced as excessive, with decisions to be taken in June 2014 on subsequent steps under the MIP – meaning those three countries are in risk of facing the opening up of EIP's. The joint decision by the Commission and Council whether or not to open up EIP's, will be taken in conjunction with the publication of the Country-Specific Recommendations in the context of the European Semester. On 2 June 2014 the Commission announced for the three countries identified with excessive imbalance: "we have found that their national reform programmes appropriately address the main challenges we identified in March. That's why we are not proposing to launch the Excessive Imbalances Procedure for these three Member States. We will however monitor very closely the implementation of today’s detailed "Country Specific Recommendations", so as to provide the same support for the reform process in these countries, as we have over the past year for Spain and Slovenia, where progress has been very encouraging".

Findings of the Macroeconomic Imbalance Procedure for all EU member states
Year	No In-depth review	No Imbalance	Imbalance	Excessive Imbalance	Excessive Imbalance Procedure	Programme countries
2012	Austria, Czech Republic, Estonia, Germany, Latvia, Lithuania, Luxembourg, Malta, Netherlands, Poland, Slovakia		Belgium, Bulgaria, Cyprus, Denmark, Finland, France, Hungary, Italy, Slovenia, Spain, Sweden, United Kingdom	No	No	Greece, Ireland, Portugal, Romania
2013	Austria, Czech Republic, Estonia, Germany, Latvia, Lithuania, Luxembourg, Poland, Slovakia		Belgium, Bulgaria, Denmark, Finland, France, Hungary, Italy, Malta, Netherlands, Sweden, United Kingdom	Slovenia, Spain	No	Cyprus, Greece, Ireland, Portugal, Romania
2014	Austria, Czech Republic, Estonia, Latvia, Lithuania, Poland, Slovakia	Denmark, Luxembourg, Malta	Belgium, Bulgaria, Finland, France, Germany, Hungary, Ireland, Netherlands, Spain, Sweden, United Kingdom	Croatia, Italy, Slovenia	No	Cyprus, Greece, Portugal, Romania
2015	Austria, Czech Republic, Denmark, Estonia, Latvia, Lithuania, Luxembourg, Malta, Poland, Slovakia		Belgium, Finland, Germany, Hungary, Ireland, Netherlands, Romania, Slovenia, Spain, Sweden, United Kingdom	Bulgaria, Croatia, France, Italy, Portugal	No	Cyprus, Greece
2016	Czech Republic, Denmark, Latvia, Lithuania, Luxembourg, Malta, Poland, Slovakia	Austria, Belgium, Estonia, Hungary, Romania, United Kingdom	Finland, Germany, Ireland, Netherlands, Slovenia, Spain, Sweden	Bulgaria, Croatia, Cyprus, France, Italy, Portugal	No	Greece
2017	Austria, Belgium, Czech Republic, Denmark, Estonia, Hungary, Latvia, Lithuania, Luxembourg, Malta, Poland, Romania, Slovakia, United Kingdom	Finland	Germany, Ireland, Netherlands, Slovenia, Spain, Sweden	Bulgaria, Croatia, Cyprus, France, Italy, Portugal	No	Greece
2018	Austria, Belgium, Czech Republic, Denmark, Estonia, Finland, Hungary, Latvia, Lithuania, Luxembourg, Malta, Poland, Romania, Slovakia, United Kingdom	Slovenia	Bulgaria, France, Germany, Ireland, Netherlands, Portugal, Spain, Sweden	Croatia, Cyprus, Italy	No	Greece
2019	Austria, Belgium, Czechia, Denmark, Estonia, Finland, Hungary, Latvia, Lithuania, Luxembourg, Malta, Poland, Slovakia, Slovenia, United Kingdom		Bulgaria, Croatia, France, Germany, Ireland, Netherlands, Portugal, Romania, Spain, Sweden	Cyprus, Greece, Italy	No	
2020	Austria, Belgium, Czechia, Denmark, Estonia, Finland, Hungary, Latvia, Lithuania, Luxembourg, Malta, Poland, Slovakia, Slovenia, United Kingdom	Bulgaria	Croatia, France, Germany, Ireland, Netherlands, Portugal, Romania, Spain, Sweden	Cyprus, Greece, Italy	No	
2021	Austria, Belgium, Bulgaria, Czechia, Denmark, Estonia, Finland, Hungary, Latvia, Lithuania, Luxembourg, Malta, Poland, Slovakia, Slovenia		Croatia, France, Germany, Ireland, Netherlands, Portugal, Romania, Spain, Sweden	Cyprus, Greece, Italy	No	
2022	Austria, Belgium, Bulgaria, Czechia, Denmark, Estonia, Finland, Hungary, Latvia, Lithuania, Luxembourg, Malta, Poland, Slovakia, Slovenia	Croatia, Ireland	France, Germany, Netherlands, Portugal, Romania, Spain, Sweden	Cyprus, Greece, Italy	No	
2023	Austria, Belgium, Bulgaria, Croatia, Denmark, Finland, Ireland, Malta, Poland, Slovenia	Czechia, Estonia, Latvia, Lithuania, Luxembourg, Slovakia	France, Germany, Cyprus, Hungary, Netherlands, Portugal, Romania, Spain, Sweden	Greece, Italy	No	
2024	Austria, Belgium, Bulgaria, Croatia, Czechia, Denmark, Estonia, Finland, Ireland, Latvia, Lithuania, Luxembourg, Malta, Poland, Slovenia	France, Portugal, Spain	Cyprus, Germany, Greece, Hungary, Italy, Netherlands, Slovakia, Sweden	Romania	No	

=== List of Excessive Imbalance surveillance reports ===
These surveillance reports listed below, published at regular intervals by the European Commission for states found to be in Excessive Imbalance, were crafted to check the country-specific progress of implementing mitigating reforms (as outlined by their annual National Reform Programme report). Each state's period with extended surveillance spans from the time, when the Commission became aware of the existence of Excessive Imbalance, until the point of time, when the particular In-Depth Review report (published annually in February/March) finds that the Excessive Imbalance no longer exists.

- Spain (April 2013 – March 2014): February 2014
- Slovenia (April 2013 – February 2015): November 2013 February 2014, December 2014, February 2015
- Croatia (March 2014 – ongoing): November 2014, February 2015
- Italy (March 2014 – ongoing): November 2014, February 2015
- France (December 2014 – ongoing): December 2014

February 2015

- Bulgaria (February 2015 – ongoing)
- Portugal (February 2015 – ongoing)

== The scoreboard ==
The scoreboard in the Alert Mechanism Report is currently made up of eleven indicators that monitor external imbalances and competitiveness, as well as internal imbalances. The indicators in the scoreboard ensure an early identification of imbalances that emerge over the short term in addition to those that arise due to structural and long-term trends. Since 2015, the scoreboard comprises 14 headline indicators for which indicative thresholds have been set. In addition the scoreboard comprises 28 auxiliary indicators without thresholds, that help to qualify its economic reading.

The design of the scoreboard is as follows:

External imbalances and competitiveness

- 3 year average of the current account balance as a percentage of GDP, with an indicative threshold of +6% and -4%.
- Net international investment position (NIIP) as a percentage of GDP, with an indicative threshold of -35%. The NIIP shows the difference between a country's external financial assets and its external financial liabilities.
- 5 year percent change of export market shares measured in values, with an indicative threshold of -6%.
- 3 year percent change in nominal unit labor cost, with indicative thresholds of +9% for euro area countries and +12% for non-euro area countries.
- 3 year percent change in real effective exchange rates (REER) based on HICP deflators, relative to 41 other industrial countries, with indicative thresholds of -/+5% for euro area countries and -/+11% for non-euro area countries. The REER shows price competitiveness relative to the main trading partners.

Internal imbalances

- private sector debt (consolidated) as a percentage of GDP, with an indicative threshold of 133%.
- private sector credit flow (consolidated) as a percentage of GDP, with an indicative threshold of 15%.
- year-on-year percentage change in deflated house prices, with an indicative threshold of 6%.
- public sector debt as a percentage of GDP, with an indicative threshold of 60%.
- year-on-year percent change in total financial liabilities of the financial sector, with an indicative threshold of 16.5%.

Social Indicators

- 3-year average of the unemployment rate, with an indicative threshold of 10%.
- 3-year change of the activity rate, with an indicative threshold of -0.2 pp.
- 3-year change of the long-term unemployment rate, with an indicative threshold of 0.5 pp.
- 3-year change of the youth unemployment rate, with an indicative threshold of 2 pp.

== Legal basis ==
The Macroeconomic Imbalance Procedure is based on two Regulations that are part of the 'six-pack' to improve economic governance in the EU. The first is Regulation 1176/2011, which lays out the details of the surveillance procedure and covers all EU member states. The second is Regulation 1174/2011, which focuses on enforcement, including the possibility of sanctions, and only applies to euro area member states.

== Quality of statistics underlying the MIP ==
The (ECOFIN) Council of the European Union, in its 2015 conclusions on EU statistics, recalled that the Macroeconomic Imbalances Procedure must rely upon sound and harmonised official statistics. The Council welcomed the close cooperation of the ESS and the ESCB, using existing fora, in ensuring the reliability of the statistics underlying the Macroeconomic Imbalances Procedure (MIP) and their comparability, welcomed the production of the first ESS-ESCB quality report on MIP statistics and encouraged the two statistical systems to give high priority to taking forward this programme.

European statistics is developed, produced and disseminated, within their respective spheres of competence, by

- the European Statistical System (ESS) – defined by Article 4 of regulation 2009/223 of the European Parliament and of the Council on European statistics and
- the European System of Central Banks (ESCB) – performing their statistical function on the basis of Article 5 of the Statute of the European System of Central Bank and the European Central Bank.

According to the Memorandum of Understanding between the ESS and the ESCB, the two systems producing European statistics cooperate on strategic level in the European Statistical Forum (ESF) and the operational platform is the Committee on monetary, financial and balance of payments statistics (CMFB).
