= Sixpack (EU law) =

EU economic governance

Within the framework of EU economic governance, Sixpack describes a set of European legislative measures to reform the Stability and Growth Pact and introduces greater macroeconomic surveillance, in response to the European debt crisis of 2009. These measures were bundled into a "six pack" of regulations, introduced in September 2010 in two versions respectively by the European Commission and a European Council task force. In March 2011, the ECOFIN council reached a preliminary agreement for the content of the Sixpack with the commission, and negotiations for endorsement by the European Parliament then started. Ultimately it entered into force 13 December 2011, after one year of preceding negotiations. The six regulations aim at strengthening the procedures to reduce public deficits and address macroeconomic imbalances.

== Overview ==
All 27 EU member states are committed by the paragraphs in the EU Treaty, referred to as the Stability and Growth Pact (SGP), to implement a fiscal policy aiming for the country to stay within the limits on government deficit (3% of GDP) and debt (60% of GDP); and in case of having a debt level above 60% it should each year have a declining trend. Each year all EU member states are obliged to submit a SGP compliance report for the scrutiny and evaluation of the European Commission and the Council of Ministers, that will present the country's expected fiscal development for the current and subsequent three years. These reports are called "stability programmes" for eurozone Member States and "convergence programmes" for non-eurozone Member States, but despite having different titles they are identical in their content. After the reform of the SGP in 2005, these programmes have also included the Medium-Term budgetary Objectives (MTOs), being individually calculated for each Member State as the medium-term sustainable average-limit for the country's structural deficit, the Member State is also obliged to outline the measures it intends to implement to attain its MTO. If the EU Member States do not comply with both the deficit limit and the debt limit, a so-called "Excessive Deficit Procedure" (EDP) is initiated along with a deadline to comply, which outlines an "adjustment path towards reaching the MTO".

Four of the six instruments in the Sixpack are used to conduct further reforms of the "Stability and Growth Pact" (SGP), focusing on improving compliance. These reforms do not change any of the conditions already imposed by the SGP, but aim to enforce greater budgetary discipline among the Member States of the euro area by stipulating that sanctions come into force earlier and more consistently. For example, when a country against which an excessive deficit procedure was opened fails to take necessary measures to eliminate its deficit, an interest-bearing deposit equalling 0.2% of GDP is due. With continued non-compliance the deposit is converted into a fine. In addition, automatic sanctions are triggered based on a different voting mechanism in the Council of the European Union. At the same time the national accounts statistics and forecast practices of Member States are adjusted to comply with EU standards. If it is determined that a country has reported false data, an additional fine may be imposed.

The remaining two pieces of legislation in the Sixpack relate to the Macroeconomic Imbalance Procedure, an early warning system and correction mechanism for excessive macroeconomic imbalances.

== Specific EU regulations and guidelines ==
Regulation
- European Union regulation
- Title: Sixpack (fiscal law package of 5 regulations and 1 directive)
- Applicability: Member states of the European Union
- Made by: European Parliament and Council
- Made under: Article 136, 121 (6) and 126(14) of the TFEU
- Journal reference: L 306, 23 November 2011

History
- Date made: 8 and 16 November 2011
- Entry into force: 13 December 2011

Specifically, the EU sixpack relates to the following regulations and guidelines:

Fiscal policy
1. Regulation 1175/2011 amending Regulation 1466/97: On the strengthening of the surveillance of budgetary positions and the surveillance and coordination of economic policies.

2. Regulation 1177/2011 amending Regulation 1467/97: On speeding up and clarifying the implementation of the excessive deficit procedure.

3. Regulation 1173/2011: On the effective enforcement of budgetary surveillance in the euro area.

4. Directive 2011/85/EU: On requirements for budgetary frameworks of the Member States.
The directive shall be implemented by all EU member states no later than 31 December 2013.

Macroeconomic imbalances
5. Regulation 1176/2011: On the prevention and correction of macroeconomic imbalances.
The regulation lays out the details of the macroeconomic imbalance surveillance procedure and covers all EU member states.

6. Regulation 1174/2011: On enforcement action to correct excessive macroeconomic imbalances in the euro area.
The regulation only apply towards all Eurozone Member States, and focuses on the possibility of sanctions and other procedures for enforcement of the needed "corrective action plan", to satisfy the EIP recommendation from the Council.

== Further proposals for the Eurozone ==
Development of the Eurozone fiscal union can be described as the fourth stage of the EMU, proposed to be implemented for the Eurozone in the near future. The argument presented was, that Member States sharing the same currency will also need more integration of fiscal policies (closer collaboration on fiscal matters) and tighter budgetary surveillance, to prevent and combat the occurrence of financial instability caused by macroeconomic imbalances inside the monetary union.

=== Two-pack ===
Regulation 473/2013
- European Union regulation
- Title: Regulation on common provisions for monitoring and assessing draft budgetary plans and ensuring the correction of excessive deficit of the Member States in the euro area.
- Applicability: Member states of the Eurozone
- Made by: European Parliament and Council
- Made under: Article 136 and 121 (6) of the TFEU
- Journal reference: L 140, 27.05.2013, p.11

History
- Date made: 21 May 2013
- Entry into force: 30 May 2013
- Implementation date: Most provisions: 30 May 2013; Some provisions: 31 Oct 2013

Preparative texts
- Commission proposal: COM/2011/0821 final (2011/0386 COD)

Regulation 472/2013
- European Union regulation
- Title: Regulation on the strengthening of economic and budgetary surveillance of Member States in the euro area experiencing or threatened with serious difficulties with respect to their financial stability.
- Applicability: Member states of the Eurozone
- Made by: European Parliament and Council
- Made under: Article 136 and 121 (6) of the TFEU
- Journal reference: L 140, 27.05.2013, p.1

History
- Date made: 21 May 2013
- Entry into force: 30 May 2013
- Implementation date: 30 May 2013

Preparative texts
- Commission proposal: COM/2011/0819 final (2011/0385 COD)

A step towards increased fiscal discipline of member States of the European Union was taken on 23 November 2011, when the European Commission proposed the two Regulations (also known as the "Two-pack"), which introduced additional coordination and surveillance of budgetary processes for all eurozone members. The additional regulations complement the SGP's requirement for surveillance, by enhancing the frequency of scrutiny of Member States' policymaking, but do not place additional requirements on the policy itself. The frequency of monitoring will depend on the economic health of the member state. As of the entry into force of the regulations, all eurozone member states are obliged to respect "Regulation 1", while "Regulation 2" – demanding even more in depth and frequent monitoring – will only be triggered if the state receive macroeconomic financial assistance or has an ongoing Excessive Imbalance Procedure (EIP):

1. Regulation 473/2013: On common provisions for monitoring and assessing draft budgetary plans and ensuring the correction of excessive deficit of the Member States in the euro area.
If the eurozone member state is not involved in an Excessive Deficit Procedure (EDP) or Excessive Imbalance Procedure (EIP) or Financial assistance programme, the only extra monitor requirement (compared to the SGP) will be for the member state to submit its draft fiscal budget for the upcoming year to the European Commission: no later than 15 October; and it shall then await receiving the Commission's opinion before it is debated and voted for in the national parliament. The European Commission will not be granted any veto right over the national parliaments potential pass of a fiscal budget, but will have the role to issue warnings in advance to the national parliaments, if the proposed draft budget is found to compromise the debt and deficit rules outlined by the European Fiscal Compact. The reporting requirements towards Eurozone member states subject to open EDP's are regulated by article 6 to 12, outlining that "status reports for corrective action" shall be published by 6 months intervals from the moment the Council has granted the country an official deadline for EDP correction, and with the frequency increased to quarterly reports for those "Member States persisting in failing to put into practice the recommendations of the Council" for corrective measures to remedy the excessive deficit situation - leading to a Council notice for immediate implementation of deficit reduction measures in accordance with article 126(9) of the TFEU. Article 6 to 12 does not apply for those Member States with open EDP's who are also subject to a macroeconomic adjustment programme - as their increased reporting requirements are specifically outlined by regulation 472/2013.

2. Regulation 472/2013: On the strengthening of economic and budgetary surveillance of Member States in the euro area experiencing or threatened with serious difficulties with respect to their financial stability.
Eurozone member states with an ongoing EIP, or being involved in a financial assistance program from EFSM/EFSF/ESM/IMF/other bilateral basis, will be required to further increase the level and frequency for submitted monitor/surveillance reports to the European Commission. This so-called "enhanced surveillance" will mean, that "status reports for corrective action" needs to be published on a quarterly basis, and that the Commission on that basis will be allowed to send warnings to the national parliament of the member state concerned, about a likely missed compliance with programme targets and/or the fiscal adjustment path to comply with EDP deadlines, at such an early stage in the process, that the affected member state still have sufficient time to implement needed counter-measures to prevent the possible delay of the required compliance. Regulation 472/2013 will continue to apply for member states recently having ended a macroeconomic financial assistance programme, with a post-programme surveillance being active until at least the time when more than 25% of the borrowed money has been repaid. In the event of a "persistent risk to the financial stability or fiscal sustainability of the Member State concerned", the Council may also decide to further extend the duration of the post-programme surveillance. Finally it shall be noted, that regulation 472/2013 will not apply for a member state without an open EIP receiving macroeconomic financial assistance only in the form of an undrawn "Precautionary Conditioned Credit Line".

The two above regulations apply towards all eurozone member states, and together form a stronger budgetary governance with a more tight system of monitoring and surveillance by the European Commission. According to article 136 in the Treaty on the Functioning of the European Union, the enactment and entry into force of the regulations required the council's adoption in agreement with the European Parliament, subject to a qualified majority of the 17 eurozone member states. The ECOFIN council reached a final agreement with the Parliament's Permanent Representatives Committee on 20 February 2013. The parliament then adopted the two-pack on 12 March, with the first regulation passed by 526 voting for towards 86 against and 66 abstentions, and with the second regulation passed by 528 voting for towards 81 against and 71 abstentions. Subsequently, the two-pack was finally adopted by the Council of the European Union on 13 May, with publication of the legal acts in the Official Journal of the European Union on 27 May, and the official legal entry into force on 30 May 2013. Most provisions will apply from the date of entry into force. In regards of the increased reporting frequency for member states with an open EDP, and the requirement to set up independent national bodies monitoring compliance with the fiscal rules, these article provisions will however only apply starting from 31 October 2013.

The provisions of the Two-pack (which only apply for Eurozone member states), complements and extends the Stability and Growth Pact already reformed by the Six-pack, and it also integrates some elements of the already ratified intergovernmental European Fiscal Compact, directly into EU law. Examples of identical elements with the Fiscal Compact: 1) Member States are required to transpose the SGP fiscal rules into national legislation, 2) Member States in EDP are required to prepare "economic partnership programmes", 3) Member States are required to submit their debt issuance plans for an ex-ante coordination with other Member States. The new legal structure introduced by the Two-pack, was in March 2013 expected to be used for the first time, when the 2014 fiscal budget draft laws shall be submitted to the European Commission for prior review and comments by 15 October 2013.

=== Eurobonds ===
On 23 November 2011, the European Commission also presented a Green paper for the possible introduction of Eurobonds (referred to as "Stability Bonds"), that outlined different options and levels for common issuance and common guarantees. The plan ultimately never moved forward in face of German and Dutch opposition; the crisis was ultimately resolved by the ECB's declaration in 2012 that it would do "whatever it takes" to stabilise the currency, rendering the Eurobond proposal moot.

=== Convergence and Competitiveness Instrument (CCI) ===
The European Commission also recently proposed the establishment of a Convergence and Competitiveness Instrument (CCI) within the EU budget. The proposal is to create a special EU budget account with earmarked money, for supporting the timely implementation of needed structural reforms (traditionally considered to be politically unpopular to implement), where the implementation funding would be paid by the CCI fund conditional on strict adherence to a prior signed "contractual arrangement" for the agreed structural reform, with the two contracting parties being the Member State and the commission. If the Member State implements the identified and needed structural reforms to ensure convergence/competitiveness, then the CCI budget will so to speak pay the Member State an economic reward of behaving in a sound and responsible way. The proposal is expected to be further debated, soon after the Council have concluded an agreement for the next 7-year EU budget (also referred to as the "Multi-annual Financial Framework 2014–2020").

An additional/related suggestion also currently being debated, is to create the CCI outside the EU budget and only let it apply for eurozone member states, with a budget instead to be covered by income from the collection of the Financial Transaction Tax (FTT). In October 2012, the FTT was formally agreed to be implemented and enter into force 1 January 2014 in 11 out of 17 eurozone member states. Currently no formal decision was however reached, if the collected income should be kept as direct national income, or perhaps instead be transferred to a supranational eurozone budget.

=== Banking Union ===
The proposal to create a Banking Union covers both the establishment of European Banking Supervision, and after its adoption also a Single Resolution Mechanism (SRM) to deal with banks in difficulties. This new independent organisation, is supposed to be in charge of the restructuring and resolution of banks within the EU Member States participating in the Banking Union (meaning that it is not limited to the eurozone). The European Commission presented the proposal 12 September 2012 and at the EU summit in October, it was agreed to formally request that a final proposal for the SSM framework be agreed between the Council and Parliament before the end of the year, with the aim for the SSM to be founded in 2013 and fully established to cover all banks starting from 1 January 2014.

On 29 November 2012, the Economic and Monetary affairs Committee of the European Parliament voted on and approved the initial framework proposal and a mutually approved final proposal agreement between the Council and Parliament is now the next step. Remaining issues for the ECOFIN council to consider at their next meeting on 4 December 2012, is to decide on: "the role of the national supervisors, the governance of the ECB and the voting rights within EBA". At the council meeting there was not sufficient time to agree on any final decision, so the council will be called for a second meeting within 8 days, with the aim of concluding the work ahead of the EU summit on 13–14 December. Any change of the EU legislation about EBA require (according to article 114 of the TFEU): A qualified majority at the council in conjunction with the Parliament's approval. While any change of the EU legislation about ECB's function/role require (according to article 127(6) of the TFEU): "Unanimity for adoption by the Council, after consulting the European Parliament and the ECB".

== See also ==
- Enhanced co-operation
- European sovereign debt crisis
- Euro Plus Pact
- Macroeconomic Imbalance Procedure
