= Japan Center =

Japan Center may refer to:

- Japan Center (Frankfurt)
- Japan Center (San Francisco)
- Japan Centers in Russia
- Japan Center for Michigan Universities, located in Shiga Prefecture, Japan
- Japan Center for International Exchange

Japan Foundation-sponsored 22 organizations outside of Japan to introduce Japanese culture, when spoken in English, are often called Japan Centers:

- Japanese cultural House in Paris (French: Maison de la culture du Japon à Paris)
- Japanisches Kulturinstitut in Cologne
- Istituto Giapponese di Cultura in Rome

etc.
