= Single Resolution Board =

Bank resolution agency in Brussels

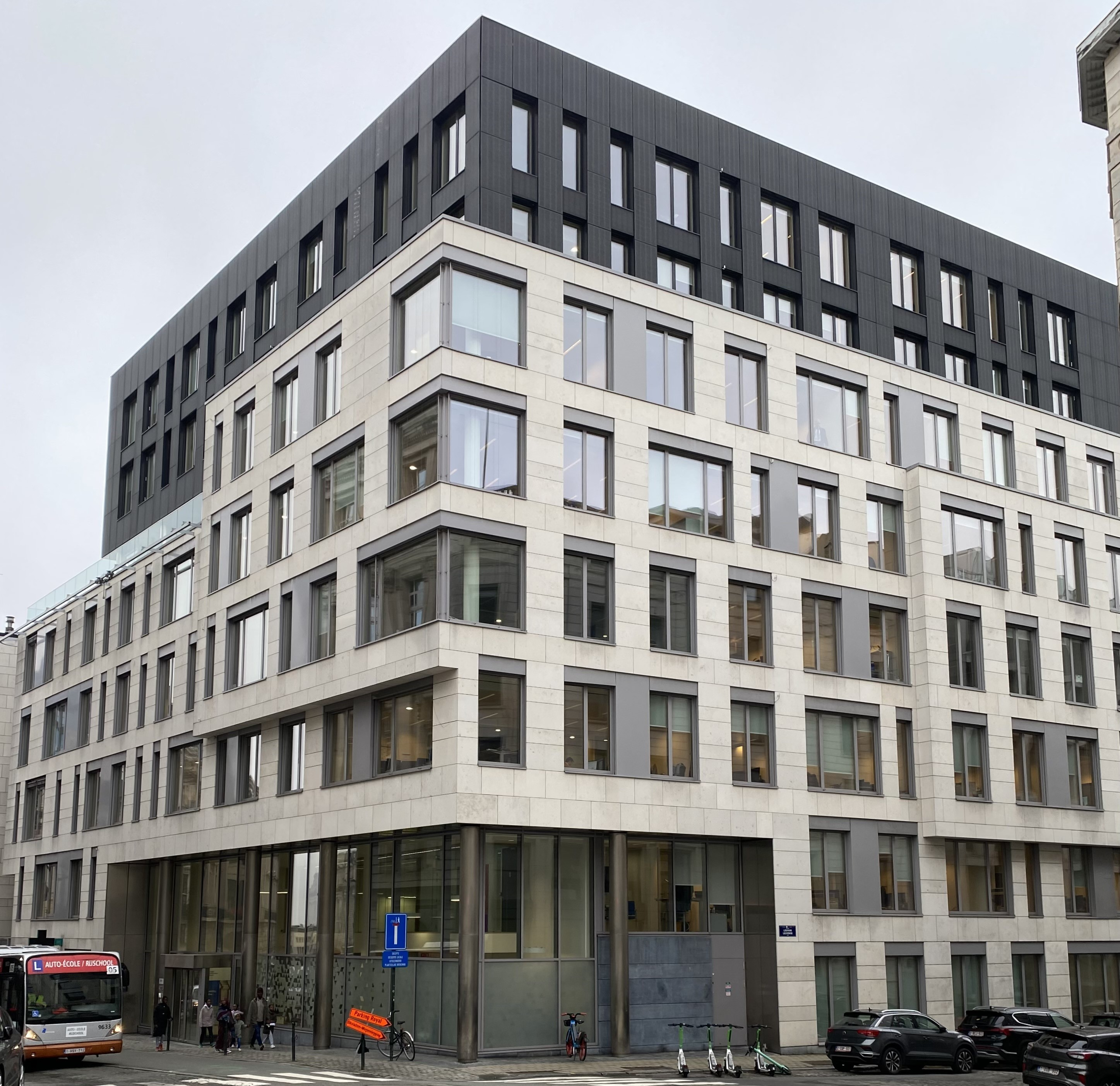
- SRB head office in Brussels

Board overview
- Formed: January 1, 2015; 11 years ago
- Type: European banking union EU agency
- Jurisdiction: European Union
- Headquarters: Treurenberg 22, 1049 Brussels, Belgium; 50.84776°N 4.36222°E
- Employees: ~465
- Board executives: Dominique Laboureix, Chair; Miguel Carcaño Saenz De Cenzano, Vice-Chair; Karen Braun-Munzinger, Member; Radek Urban, Member; Tuija Taos, Member; Slavka Eley, Member
- Key documents: Work Programme; Resolution Planning
- Website: www.srb.europa.eu/en

Map
- Single Resolution Board (European Union)

The Single Resolution Board (SRB) is an EU agency that was established in Brussels in 2015 as part of the broader set of reforms known as the banking union. It acts as the bank resolution authority for a subset of banks in the euro area and as the institutional hub of the Single Resolution Mechanism (SRM). Resolution is the restructuring of a bank by a resolution authority through the use of resolution tools in order to safeguard public interests, including the continuity of the bank's critical functions and financial stability, at minimal costs to taxpayers.

== History ==
The SRB was established by the EU Single Resolution Mechanism Regulation of 2014. Its leadership was appointed in December 2014. The Board became operational on 1 January 2015, with full assumption of its resolution authority on 1 January 2016.

Its early development was supported by the European Commission. It moved to its current office on Treurenberg 22 in central Brussels in late 2015.

The initial activity of the SRB was largely about establishing processes and methodologies, particularly in the area of resolution planning.

In June 2017, the SRB took its first decision to take resolution action in the case of Banco Popular Español. In March 2022, the European unit of Sberbank was determined to be failing or likely to fail, in the context of the 2022 Russian invasion of Ukraine and the ensuing EU sanctions against Russian lenders. The SRB decided that Sberbank Europe's Austrian parent entity would go into insolvency, but took resolution action on two subsidiaries in Croatia and Slovenia, which it respectively sold to Hrvatska postanska banka and to Nova Ljubljanska Banka.

== Single Resolution Fund ==
The Single Resolution Fund (SRF) was established by the SRM Regulation. Where necessary, it may be used to ensure the efficient application of resolution tools and the exercise of the resolution powers conferred to the SRB by the SRM Regulation. The SRF is composed of contributions from credit institutions and certain investment firms in the 21 participating Member States within the Banking Union. It is being gradually built up during the period until 2023 included, and shall reach the target level of at least 1% of the amount of covered deposits of all credit institutions within the Banking Union by 31 December 2023. As of 31 December 2024, the SRF amounts to €80 billion, which is above the 1% of covered deposits.

== Composition ==
=== Board members ===
The Board, in a narrow sense, is composed of six members : the SRB Chair, the Vice-Chair and four full-time Board Members. These four full-time Board Members as well as the Vice-Chair are responsible for SRB directorates.

The composition of the Board has been, over time, the following one:

- Chair:
  - Elke König (2015–2022)
  - Dominique Laboureix (since 2023)
- Vice Chair:
  - Timo Löyttyniemi (2015–2020)
  - Jan Reinder De Carpentier (2020–2025)
  - Miguel Carcaño Saenz De Cenzano (since 2025)
- Full-time Board Members:
  - Joanne Kellermann (2015–2017)
  - Mauro Grande (2015–2019)
  - Dominique Laboureix (2015–2019)
  - Antonio Carrascosa (2015–2020)
  - Boštjan Jazbec (2018–2023)
  - Sebastiano Laviola (2019–2024)
  - Pedro Machado (2020–2025)
  - Jesús Saurina (2020–2025)
  - Tuija Taos (since 2023)
  - Karen Braun-Munzinger (since 2024)
  - Slavka Eley (since 2025)
  - Radek Urban (since 2025)

=== National Resolution Authorities ===
The National Resolution Authorities (NRAs) participate in the SRB's plenary sessions, and in certain circumstances set out in the SRM Regulation, also occasionally in executive sessions. As of January 2024, they were the following:

- Austria: Financial Market Authority (FMA)
- Belgium: National Bank of Belgium
- Bulgaria: Bulgarian National Bank
- Croatia: Croatian National Bank
- Cyprus: Central Bank of Cyprus
- Estonia: Estonian Financial Supervisory Authority (FI)
- Finland: Finnish Financial Stability Authority (RVV)
- France: Prudential Supervision and Resolution Authority (ACPR)
- Germany: Federal Financial Supervisory Authority (BaFin)
- Greece: Bank of Greece
- Ireland: Central Bank of Ireland
- Italy: Bank of Italy
- Latvia: Bank of Latvia
- Lithuania: Bank of Lithuania
- Luxembourg: Commission de Surveillance du Secteur Financier (CSSF)
- Malta: Malta Financial Services Authority (MFSA)
- Netherlands: De Nederlandsche Bank
- Portugal: Banco de Portugal
- Slovakia: Slovak Resolution Council
- Slovenia: Bank of Slovenia
- Spain: Fondo de Reestructuración Ordenada Bancaria (FROB)

== See also ==
- Federal Deposit Insurance Corporation
- European banking union
- European Banking Supervision
- Single Resolution Mechanism
- List of financial supervisory authorities by country
