= Finnish Financial Supervisory Authority =

Financial supervisory authority in Finland

Finnish Financial Supervisory Authority (FIN-FSA)
- Finanssivalvonta (Fiva); Finansinspektionen (FI)

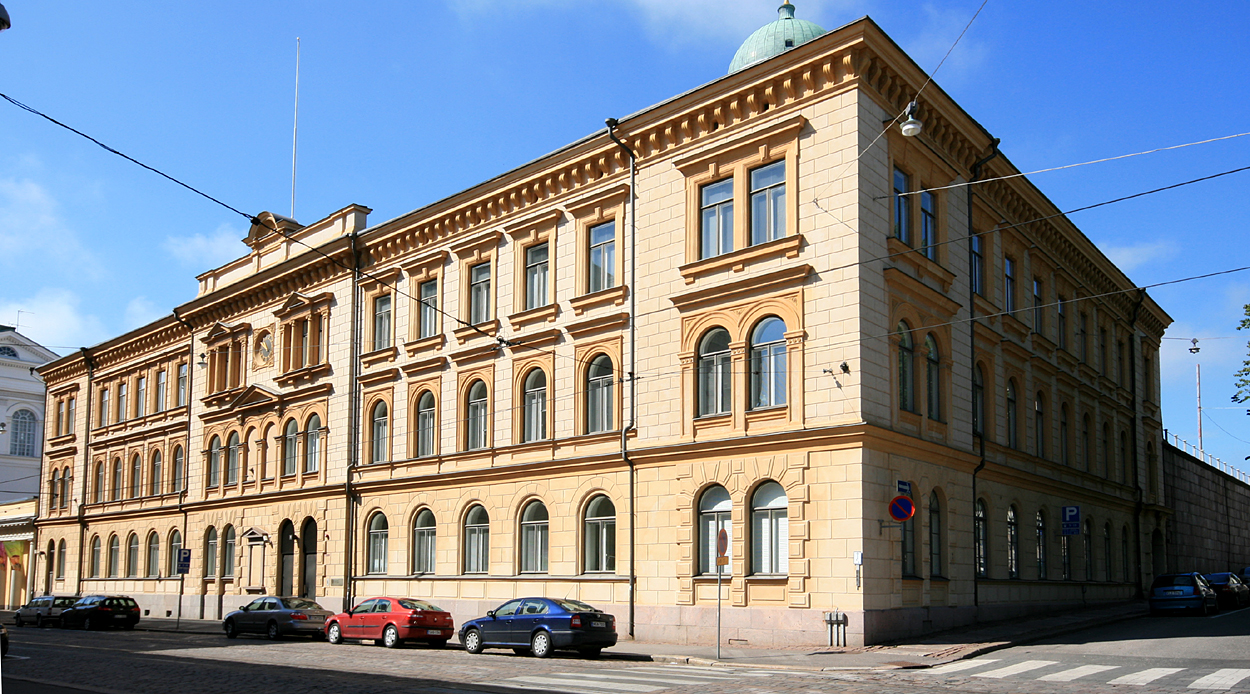
- FIN-FSA building in Kruununhaka, Helsinki

Agency overview
- Formed: January 1, 2009
- Jurisdiction: Finland
- Headquarters: Helsinki, Finland
- Agency executive: Mr. Tero Kurenmaa, Director General
- Website: www.finanssivalvonta.fi

The Finnish Financial Supervisory Authority (FIN-FSA; Finnish: Finanssivalvonta or Fiva; Swedish: Finansinspektionen or FI) is the financial supervisory authority responsible for the regulation of financial services in Finland.

Under European Union policy frameworks, the FIN-FSA is the national competent authority for Finland within European Banking Supervision. It is a voting member of the respective Boards of Supervisors of the European Banking Authority (EBA), European Insurance and Occupational Pensions Authority (EIOPA), and European Securities and Markets Authority (ESMA). It provides the permanent single common representative for Finland in the Supervisory composition of the General Board of the Anti-Money Laundering Authority (AMLA). It is also a member of the European Systemic Risk Board (ESRB).

== History ==
The Financial Supervisory Authority (FIN-FSA) was established on 1 January 2009, following a merger of the former Financial Supervision Authority and the Insurance Supervisory Authority. FIN-FSA operates in connection with the Bank of Finland. The predecessor of the Financial Supervision Authority was the Banking Supervision Office (in Finnish: Rahoitustarkastus [Rata]; also then in Swedish: Finansinspektionen [FI]).

== See also ==
- Bank of Finland
- Finnish Financial Stability Authority
- Economy of Finland
- Securities Commission
- List of financial supervisory authorities by country
