= Finnish Financial Stability Authority =

Financial supervisory authority in Finland

Financial Stability Authority
- Rahoitusvakausvirasto
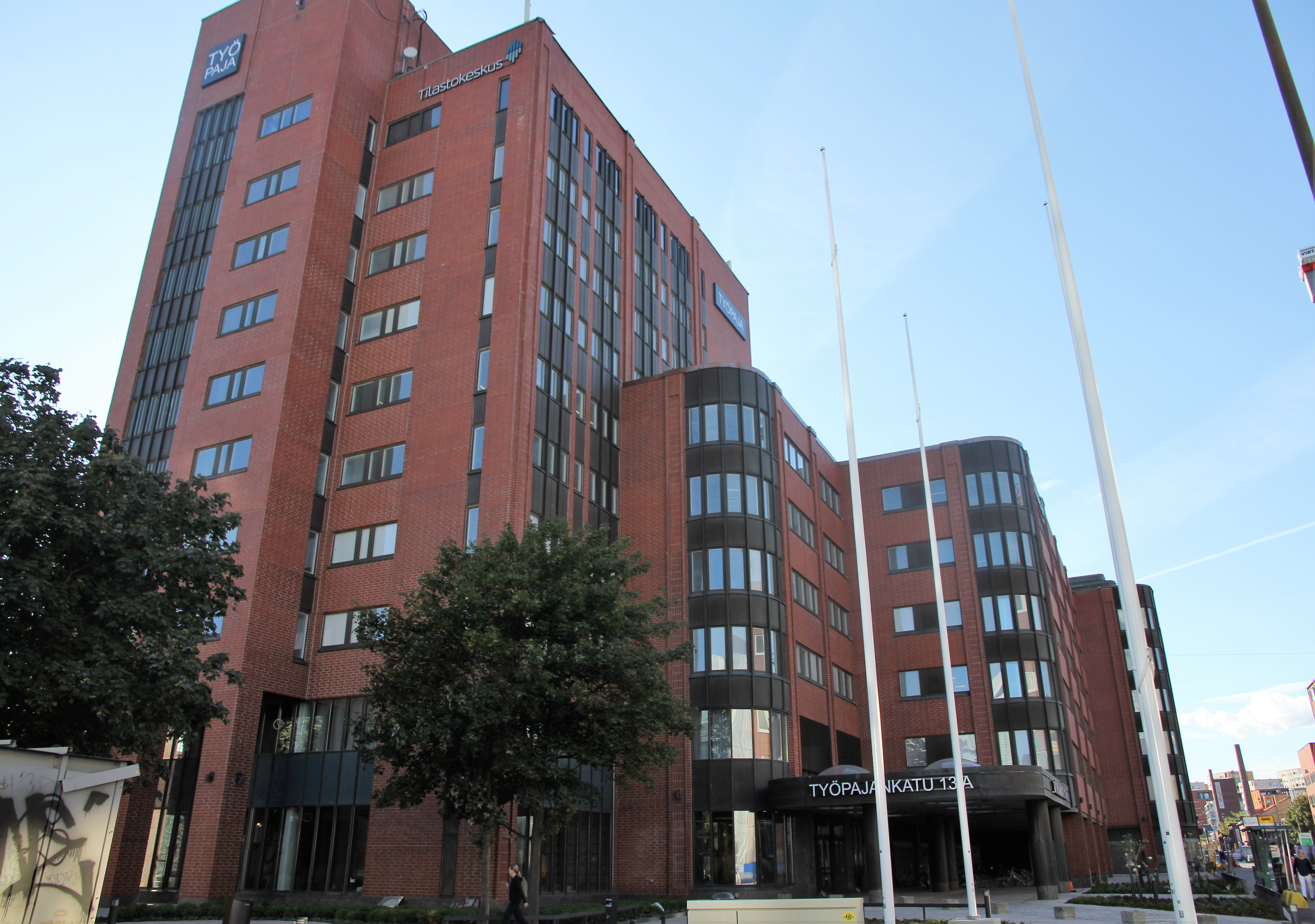

Agency overview
- Formed: 2015
- Jurisdiction: Finland
- Headquarters: Helsinki
- Agency executive: Jaakko Weuro, Director General
- Website: rvv.fi/en

The Finnish Financial Stability Authority (Finnish: Rahoitusvakausvirasto, RVV) is a Finnish financial supervisory authority established at the beginning of 2015 which is the designated bank resolution authority in Finland. As such, it is responsible for planning the resolution of credit institutions and investment companies, as well as decision-making to reorganize the operations of institutions that have fallen into financial difficulties. It also manages Finland's national deposit insurance system.

Under the Single Resolution Mechanism, the RVV is Finland's designated National Resolution Authority and plenary session member of the Single Resolution Board (SRB).

== History ==
The authority was established at the beginning of 2015 by the Finnish Government. Initially located in the same building as the Finnish Financial Supervisory Authority, it moved in 2018 to its current address in the Kalasatama neighborhood of Helsinki, in the same building as Statistics Finland.

== Overview ==
The Financial Stability Authority participates in the work of the SRB and closely cooperates with it in issues related to resolution. The Financial Stability Authority is also responsible for managing the official tasks related to the planning of the resolution of Finland's central securities depository.

In addition, the Financial Stability Authority acts as Finland's national authority responsible for deposit insurance. The Authority performs tasks belonging to the deposit protection system, collects deposit protection fees and decides on the payment obligation of the deposit protection fund. The Financial Stability Authority manages the Financial Stability Fund outside the state budget, which consists of the resolution fund accumulated as stability fees and the deposit protection fund accumulated as deposit protection fees. The Financial Stability Authority maintains a security of supply account system, which consists of a security of supply account service and a security of supply service for card payments.

== Leadership ==
- Tuija Taos, Director General 2015–2023
- Jaakko Weuro, Director General since 2023

== See also ==
- Finnish Financial Supervisory Authority
- List of financial supervisory authorities by country
