= European banking union =

European policy

The European banking union refers to the transfer of responsibility for banking policy from the member state-level to the union-wide level in several EU member states, initiated in 2012 as a response to the 2009 eurozone crisis. The motivation for the banking union was the fragility of numerous banks in the eurozone, and the identification of a vicious circle between credit conditions for these banks and the sovereign credit of their respective home countries ("bank-sovereign vicious circle"). In several countries, private debts arising from a property bubble were transferred to the respective sovereign as a result of banking system bailouts and government responses to slowing economies post-bubble. Conversely, weakness in sovereign credit resulted in deterioration of the balance sheet position of the banking sector, not least because of high domestic sovereign exposures of the banks.

As of mid-2020, the Banking union of the European Union largely consists of two main initiatives, European Banking Supervision and the Single Resolution Mechanism, which are based upon the EU's "single rulebook" or common financial regulatory framework. The SSM took up its authority on 4 November 2014, and the SRM entered into full force on 1 January 2015. Most accounts of banking union view it as incomplete in the absence of a European deposit insurance. The European Commission made a legislative proposal for a Deposit Insurance Scheme in November 2015, but it has not been adopted by the EU co-legislators.

Until October 2020 and starting again from January 2026, the geographical scope of the European Banking Union is identical to that of the eurozone. Other non-euro member states may join the European Banking Union under a procedure known as close cooperation. Bulgaria and Croatia initiated requests for close cooperation, in July 2018 and May 2019 respectively. Following a formal approval of these requests in June 2020, the European Central Bank started supervising the larger Bulgarian and Croatian banks on 1 October 2020.

In December 2023 Italy's lower house of parliament voted against reforming the euro zone bailout fund ESM preventing parliament from approving the same reform text in the six months to come, and blocking implementation of the Single Resolution Mechanism.

== Name ==
The earliest recorded public use of the expression "banking union" in the eurozone crisis context was in an article by scholar Nicolas Véron published near-simultaneously by Bruegel, the Peterson Institute for International Economics and VoxEU.org (a website of CEPR) in December 2011. It paralleled the earlier advocacy of fiscal union by various observers and policymakers in the same context, especially in Germany in the second half of 2011. According to Véron, the expression had been suggested to him by European Commission official Maarten Verwey. From April 2012, the expression was later popularised by the financial press, initially with reference to its use by Bruegel scholars. From June 2012 onward, it was increasingly used in the public policy debate, including by the European Commission.

== Background and formation ==
The integration of bank regulation has long been sought by EU policymakers, as a complement to the internal market for capital and, from the 1990s on, of the single currency. However, powerful political obstacles including the willingness of member states to retain instruments of financial repression and economic nationalism led to the failure of prior attempts to create a European framework for banking supervision, including during the negotiation of the Maastricht Treaty in 1991 and of the Treaty of Nice in 2000. During the 2000s, the emergence of pan-European banking groups through cross-border mergers and acquisitions (such as the purchases of Abbey National by Santander Group, HypoVereinsbank by UniCredit and Banca Nazionale del Lavoro by BNP Paribas) led to renewed calls for banking policy integration, not least by the International Monetary Fund, but with limited policy action beyond the creation of the Committee of European Banking Supervisors in 2004.

Deterioration of credit conditions during the eurozone crisis, and specifically the contagion of financial instability to larger member states of the eurozone from the middle of 2011, led to renewed thinking about the interdependence between banking policy, financial integration, and financial stability. On 17 April 2012, IMF managing director Christine Lagarde renewed the institution's earlier calls for banking policy integration by specifically referring to the need for the euro monetary union to be "...supported by stronger financial integration which our analysis suggests be in the form of unified supervision, a single bank resolution authority with a common backstop, and a single deposit insurance fund." The following week on 25 April 2012, European Central Bank President Mario Draghi echoed this call by noting in a speech before the European Parliament that "Ensuring a well-functioning EMU implies strengthening banking supervision and resolution at European level". Suggestions for more integrated European banking supervision were further discussed during an informal European Council meeting on 23 May 2012, and appear to have been backed at the time by French president François Hollande, Italian prime minister Mario Monti, and European Commission president José Manuel Barroso. German chancellor Angela Merkel signalled a degree of convergence on this agenda when declaring on 4 June 2012, that European leaders "will also talk about to what extent we have to put systemically (important) banks under a specific European oversight".

Another milestone was the report delivered on 26 June 2012, by European Council President Herman Van Rompuy, which called for deeper integration in the eurozone and proposed major changes in four areas. First, it called for a banking union encompassing direct recapitalisation of banks by the European Stability Mechanism, a common financial supervisor, a common bank resolution scheme and a deposit guarantee fund. Second, the proposals for a fiscal union included a strict supervision of eurozone countries' budgets, and calls for eurobonds in the medium term. Third, it called for more integration on economic policy, and fourth, for the strengthening of democratic legitimacy and accountability. The latter is generally envisioned as giving supervisory powers to the European Parliament in financial matters and in reinforcing the political union. A new treaty would be required to enact the proposed changes.

The key moment of decision was a summit of euro area heads of state and government on 28–29 June 2012. The summit's brief statement, published early on 29 June, began with a declaration of intent, "We affirm that it is imperative to break the vicious circle between banks and sovereigns," which was later repeated in numerous successive communications of the European Council. It followed by announcing two major policy initiatives: first, the creation of European Banking Supervision under the European Central Bank's central authority, using Article 127(6) of the Treaty on the Functioning of the European Union; and second, "when an effective single supervisory mechanism is established," the possibility of direct bank recapitalisation by the European Stability Mechanism, possibly with retroactive effect in the case of Spain and Ireland.

In the following weeks, the German government quickly backtracked on the commitment about direct bank recapitalisation by the ESM. In September 2012, it was joined on this stance by the governments of Finland and the Netherlands. Eventually, such conditions were put on the ESM direct recapitalisation instrument that, as of September 2014, it has never been activated. However, the establishment of European Banking Supervision proceeded apace. Furthermore, in December 2012 the European Council announced the creation of the Single Resolution Mechanism. Europe's banking union has been identified by many analysts and policymakers as a major structural policy initiative that has played a significant role in addressing the eurozone crisis.

== Single Rulebook ==
The single rulebook is a name for the EU laws that collectively govern the financial sector across the entire European Union. The provisions of the single rulebook are set out in three main legislative acts:

- Capital Requirements Regulation and Directive (also known as CRD IV; Regulation (EU) No 575/2013 of 26 June 2013; Directive 2013/36/EU of 26 June 2013), which implements the Basel III capital requirements for banks.
- Deposit Guarantee Scheme Directive (DGSD; Directive 2014/49/EU of 16 April 2014), which regulates deposit insurance in case of a bank's inability to pay its debts.
- Bank Recovery and Resolution Directive (BRRD; Directive 2014/59/EU of 15 May 2014), which establishes a framework for the recovery and resolution of credit institutions and investment firms in danger of failing.

== European Banking Supervision ==
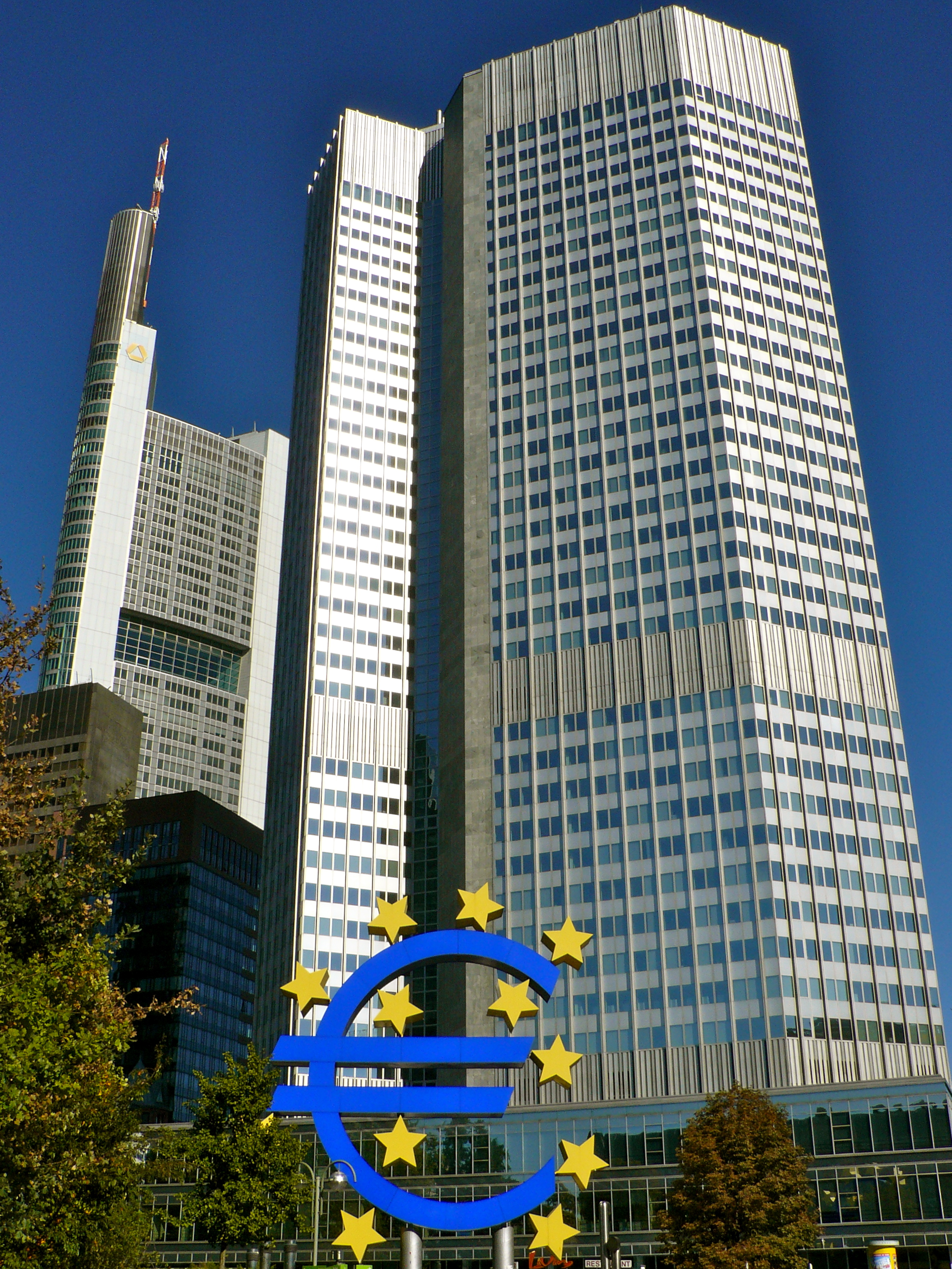
The Eurotower, home of the European Central Bank supervisory staff

The first pillar of the banking union is European Banking Supervision, also known as the Single Supervisory Mechanism (SSM), which grants the European Central Bank (ECB) a leading supervisory role over banks in the euro area. Participation is automatic for all euro area member states, and optional for other EU member states through the process known as "close cooperation" established by the SSM Regulation of October 2013.

While all banks in participating states will be under the supervision of the ECB, this is carried out in co-operation with national supervisors. The banking groups designated by the SSM as "significant institutions", including all those with assets greater than 30 billion euros or 20% of the GDP of the member state where they are based, are directly supervised by the ECB. Smaller banks, known in the banking union as "less significant institutions", remain directly monitored by the national supervisory authorities of the member state in which they are established, even though the ECB has indirect supervisory oversight and also the authority to take over direct supervision of any bank. The ECB's monitoring regime includes conducting stress tests on financial institutions. If problems are found, the ECB will have the ability to conduct early intervention in the bank to rectify the situation, such as by setting capital or risk limits or by requiring changes in management.

The SSM was enacted through Council Regulation (EU) No 1024/2013 of 15 October 2013 conferring specific tasks on the European Central Bank concerning policies relating to the prudential supervision of credit institutions, known as the SSM Regulation. Significantly, since this EU Regulation is based on Article 127(6) TFEU, it was adopted by unanimity of the Council, with only a consultative role for the European Parliament. To secure the consent of the United Kingdom, however, it was critical to simultaneously adopt a reform of the EBA Regulation of 2010 (Regulation (EU) No 1022/2013 of the European Parliament and of the Council of 22 October 2013 amending Regulation (EU) No 1093/2010 establishing a European Supervisory Authority (European Banking Authority) as regards the conferral of specific tasks on the European Central Bank pursuant to Council Regulation (EU) No 1024/2013), which in practice gave the European Parliament a veto and thus a significant role in the legislative process. Any future modification of the SSM Regulation may also require unanimity of the council.

The European Commission released their proposal for the SSM in September 2012. The European Parliament and Council agreed on the specifics of the SSM on 19 March 2013. The Parliament voted in favour of the SSM and EBA Regulations on 12 September 2013, and the Council of the European Union gave their approval on 15 October 2013.

As set in the SSM Regulation, the ECB assumed its supervisory authority on 4 November 2014.

== Single Resolution Mechanism ==
Signatories of the Agreement on the transfer and mutualisation of contributions to the Single Resolution Fund within the eurozone outside the eurozone (not applying the treaty) Signatories that have not ratified EU members that may accede to the treaty

The Single Resolution Mechanism (SRM) was created to centrally implement the Bank Recovery and Resolution Directive in banking union countries, including a Single Resolution Fund (SRF) to finance resolution operations. The SRF is valued at 1% of covered deposits of all credit institutions authorised in the participating member states (estimated at 55 billion euros), to be filled with contributions by participating banks during an eight-year establishment phase ending on 31 December 2023. A key motivation is to alleviate the impact of failing banks on the sovereign debt of individual states and thus to mitigate the bank-sovereign vicious circle. All EU member states participating in the SSM, any those non-euro countries with a "close cooperation" agreement, are also participants in the SRM.

The Single Resolution Board, a new agency established as the institutional hub of the SRM, is directly responsible for the resolution of significant institutions supervised by the ECB.

The SRM was enacted through a legislative act known as the SRM Regulation ("Regulation of the European Parliament and of the Council establishing uniform rules and a uniform procedure for the resolution of credit institutions and certain investment firms in the framework of a Single Resolution Mechanism and a Single Bank Resolution Fund and amending Regulation (EU) No 1093/2010 of the European Parliament and of the Council"). In addition, an intergovernmental agreement (IGA) was made to govern the specifics of how the SRF would be financed ("Agreement on the transfer and mutualisation of contributions to the Single Resolution Fund"). The SRM Regulation was proposed by the European Commission in July 2013. The Parliament and the Council of the European Union reached an agreement on the Regulation on 20 March 2014. The European Parliament approved the Regulation on 15 April, and the Council followed suit on 14 July 2014, leading to its entry into force on 19 August 2014. The Intergovernmental Agreement (IGA) was signed by all 26 EU member states on 21 May 2014, excluding Sweden. Its entry into force was conditional on the Agreement being ratified by states representing 90% of the weighted vote of SSM and SRM participating states. This was achieved on 30 November 2015, when all participating states apart from Greece and Luxembourg had ratified. Greece ratified on 7 December. The agreement entered into force on 1 January 2016 for SSM and SRM participating states. Luxembourg subsequently ratified on 11 January 2016.

== European deposit insurance and regulatory treatment of sovereign exposures ==
From the start in early 2012, advocates of banking union have insisted on the need to set up a European deposit insurance in order to break the bank-sovereign vicious circle. This component of the banking union has been initially more controversial than the SSM or SRM, however, because of the strong signal it entails of cross-border risk-sharing. In November 2015, the European Commission published a legislative proposal for a European Deposit Insurance Scheme (EDIS), but this did not get traction in the ensuing legislative process, even after the Commission in October 2017 watered down its project by suggesting a partial implementation. In June 2019, the European Commission conceded that an entirely new proposal might be needed to bring the vision of European deposit insurance to fruition.

One reason for the failure of the EDIS proposal is that it embedded an imbalanced approach to breaking the bank-sovereign vicious circle, as it only tackled one key component of that vicious circle – the fact that deposit insurance is only provided at the national level – while leaving intact another one – namely, the continued existence of concentrated domestic sovereign exposures in most euro-area banks, or in other words, the fact that euro-area banks appear to give preference to their home country in their allocation of credit to governments despite the absence of exchange rate risk within the monetary union. The financial and political salience of this challenge, widely referred to as "regulatory treatment of sovereign exposures" (RTSE), was not immediately recognized in the early debates about the banking union. In 2015-2016 a high-level working group of the EFC chaired by Per Callesen explored options to tackle concentrated exposures, but no consensus was achieved and the final report was not made public.

The link between the two themes of European deposit insurance and RTSE has been acknowledged by EU officials and embedded in negotiating frameworks of the council. As of mid-2020, however, no tangible progress has been achieved on reaching a policy consensus.

== Geographical scope and close cooperation ==
The 21 eurozone member states automatically participate in European Banking Supervision and the Single Resolution Mechanism (SRM).

Since the EU treaties only give the ECB jurisdiction over eurozone states, legally it cannot enforce measures in non-eurozone states. This would prevent the ECB from effectively carrying out its supervisory role in these states. Under the European Treaties, non-eurozone countries do not have the right to vote in the ECB's Governing Council and in return are not bound by the ECB's decisions. Non-eurozone countries cannot become full members of the SSM and SRM in the sense of having the same rights and obligations as eurozone members. However, non-eurozone EU member states can enter into a "close cooperation agreement" on the SSM with the ECB. The banks in that country are then supervised by the ECB and the country gains a seat in the ECB Supervisory Board. It would allow banks in that country to be supervised by the ECB provided that they have mechanisms in place to make ECB measures binding upon national authorities. A "close cooperation" agreement can be ended by the ECB or by the participating non-eurozone member state. The text of the SRM stipulates that all states participating in the SSM, including those non-eurozone states with a "close cooperation" agreement, will automatically be participants in the SRM.

=== Bulgaria ===
The first request to enter into "close cooperation" was made by Bulgaria on 18 July 2018.

Bulgaria's Finance Minister, Vladislav Goranov, stated in July 2017 that his country would not participate prior to euro adoption. However, after pressure from the ECB to begin participating in the European Banking Union prior to joining the European Exchange Rate Mechanism (ERM II), Goranov said in June 2018 that Bulgaria would join the European Banking Union within a year. Bulgaria sent a letter to the Eurogroup in July 2018 on its desire to participate in ERM II, and commitment to enter into a "close cooperation" agreement with the Banking Union. The ECB governing council decided on 24 June 2020 to establish a close cooperation with the Bulgarian central bank. The close cooperation entered into force on 1 October 2020. The Bulgarian National Bank thus receives a representative with voting rights on the ECB Supervisory Board and on 1 October 2020, the European Central Bank started supervising the larger Bulgarian banks after the completion of a significance assessment process. On 1 January 2026, Bulgaria joined the eurozone and thus became a full member of the European banking union.

=== Croatia ===
Croatia likewise submitted a request for closer cooperation in May 2019, as part of its efforts to join the ERM II. Croatia was expected to join the European Banking Union and ERM II by July 2020. The ECB governing council decided on 24 June 2020 to establish a close cooperation with the Croatian central bank. The close cooperation entered into force on 1 October 2020. The Croatian National Bank thus receives a representative with voting rights on the ECB Supervisory Board and on 1 October 2020, the European Central Bank started supervising the larger Croatian banks after the completion of a significance assessment process. Croatia joined the eurozone, and thus became a full member of the European banking union, as of 1 January 2023.

=== Denmark ===
The Danish government announced in April 2015 its intention to join the European Banking Union. Although the Ministry of Justice found that the move did not entail any transfer of sovereignty and thus would not automatically require a referendum, the Danish People's Party, Red Green Alliance and Liberal Alliance oppose joining the European Banking Union and collectively the three won enough seats in the subsequent June 2015 election to prevent the Folketing (the Danish parliament) from joining without the approval through a referendum. As of July 2017, Denmark was studying joining, with a decision expected in the autumn of 2019.

On 10 July 2017, the Danish Central Bank (Danmarks Nationalbank) published a statement in English on its official website, stating under the section entitled “Danmarks Nationalbank's views on Danish participation”:

Danmarks Nationalbank believes that Denmark should join the European banking union. In short, it is Danmarks Nationalbank's assessment that participation will benefit Danish households and firms.

Generally speaking, the banking union will make a positive contribution to financial stability. This is relevant to all of us. As we saw after 2008, a financial crisis can have a severe impact on the economic infrastructure most of us rely on: investments, mortgage loans, business growth opportunities, employment, and government revenue and expenditure. The banking union can be seen as a bulwark against future financial crises. It will also ensure that the impact is less severe if banks do, nevertheless, become distressed.

In addition, there are a number of special factors that make it particularly interesting for Denmark to participate in the banking union.

Some Danish banks and mortgage banks are very large relative to the size of the economy. In Danmarks Nationalbank's assessment, supervision of the largest Danish banks and mortgage banks would be strengthened in the banking union. Danmarks Nationalbank also finds that participation in the banking union would be an advantage if a large Danish bank or mortgage bank ever became distressed. A single, powerful resolution authority would then be better equipped to minimise the adverse effects on the economy and the financial system without the use of public funds.

A level playing field across borders would also enhance competition in the Danish banking market, which would only be to the benefit of Danish households and firms.

Furthermore, as a member of the banking union, Denmark would have a say when European rules, standards and practices are being established. Inter alia, this means that the mortgage credit model would be more strongly positioned inside than outside the banking union.

In a press release from 19 December 2019, the Danish Ministry of Industry, Business and Financial Affairs quoted Danish Minister for Industry, Business and Financial Affairs, Simon Kollerup, as saying:

... It is the government’s position that there is a need for greater clarity concerning a number of important issues before we can determine our position on Danish participation: Sweden’s position is unclear; work on additional elements of the Banking Union is still ongoing, and the United Kingdom’s future relationship with the EU remains to be finalised. In addition, there is still uncertainty concerning how the new Basel recommendations will be implemented in the EU, which can have significant impact on the framework conditions for the Danish financial sector, regardless of whether we participate in the Banking Union or not. The government will return to the issue when there is greater clarity on these issues, and when we have had a good public debate on possible Danish participation. It is the government’s position that if we end up recommending that Denmark should participate in the Banking Union, a referendum on the issue should be held.

=== Sweden ===
Since the rise in resolution fund fees for Swedish banks to protect against banking failures in 2017, resulting in the move of the headquarters of the biggest bank in Sweden and the entire Nordic region, Nordea, from Stockholm to the Finnish capital Helsinki, which lies within the eurozone and therefore also within the European Banking Union, there has been discussion about Sweden joining the European Central Bank's Banking Union. Nordea's chairman of the board, Björn Wahlroos, stated that the bank wanted to put itself "on a par with its European peers" in justifying the relocation from Stockholm to Helsinki.

The main aim for joining the European Banking Union would be to protect Swedish banks against being "too big to fail". Sweden's Financial Markets Minister Per Bolund said that the country was conducting a study on joining, which was planned to be completed by 2019. Critics argue that Sweden will be disadvantaged by joining the banking union because it does not have any voting rights, as it is not a member of the eurozone. Swedish Finance Minister Madgalena Andersson stated: “You can't ignore the fact that the decision-making can be a little problematic for countries not in the eurozone.”

== See also ==
- Economic and Monetary Union of the European Union
- Capital Markets Union
- Internal Market of the European Union
- Shadow Banking
