= AnaCredit =

Dataset of the European Central Bank

AnaCredit is a dataset of the European Central Bank, containing detailed information on individual bank loans in the euro area, harmonised across all member states. “AnaCredit” stands for analytical credit datasets.

The decision by the ECB to go ahead and create what is now known as AnaCredit was made in February 2014.

== Overview ==
The purpose is to support:

- monetary policy analysis and operations;
- risk management;
- financial stability surveillance.

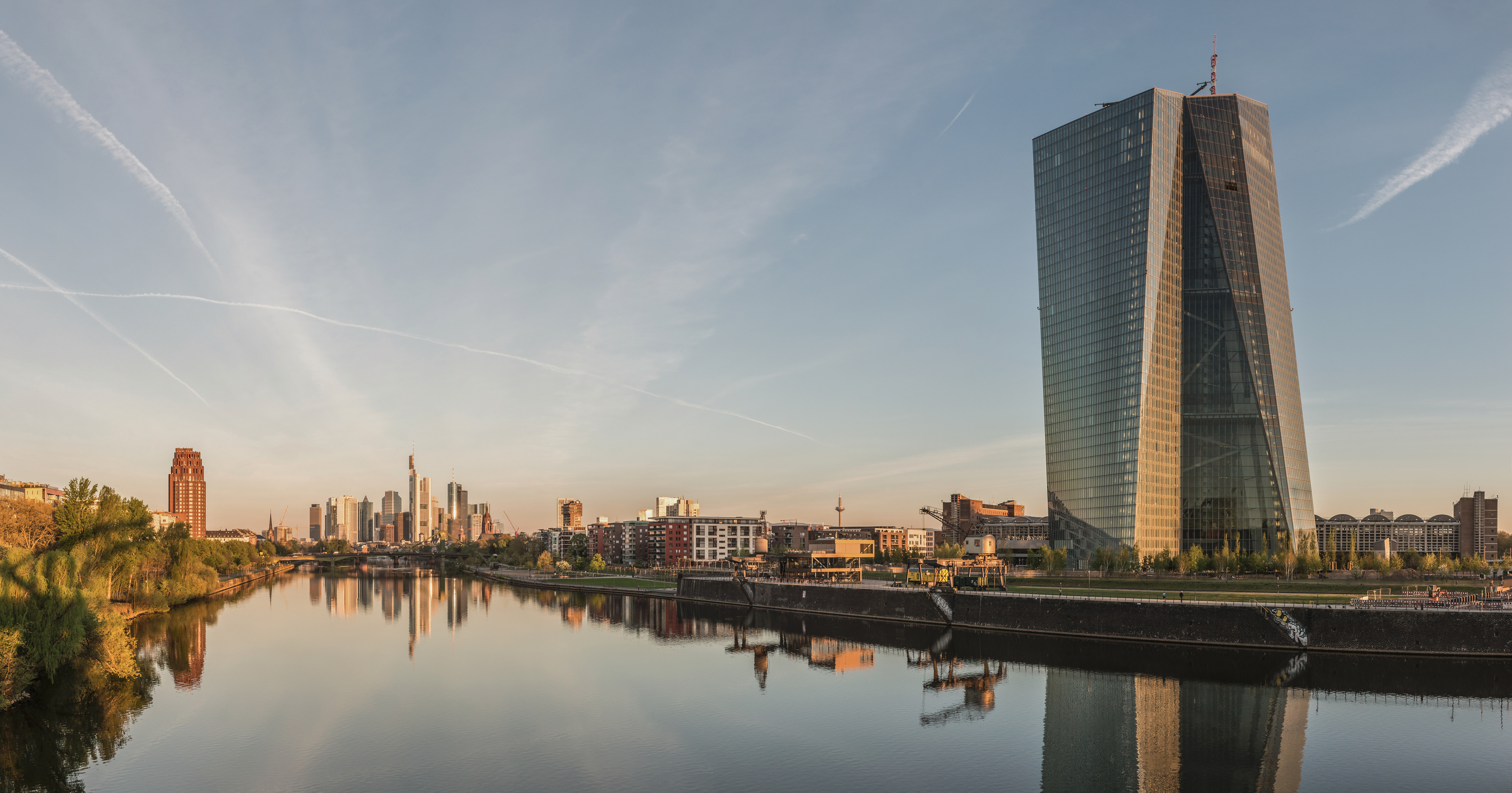
Seat of the European Central Bank and Frankfurt Skyline at dawn 20150422 1

AnaCredit focuses on the collection of granular credit data to address the main data needs of the ESCB. While some of the data could be also helpful for prudential supervision, AnaCredit is not set up to meet banking supervisory needs, and no specific requirements pertaining to European Banking Supervision are included in the Regulation.

Eurozone states are obliged to participate, while Member states of the European Union outside the eurozone can voluntarily participate. Two of the Scandinavian countries: Denmark and Sweden have announced their intention to do so.

The project was initiated in 2011, and data collection is scheduled to start in September 2018. The final regulation was decided by the ECB's Governing Council on 18 May 2016.

== Reporting population ==
The following entities are subject to the reporting requirements:

- Credit institutions resident in a euro area Member State;
- Branches of credit institutions, provided that the branches are resident in a euro area Member State.

=== Derogations ===
The relevant national central bank may grant derogations to small reporting agents in accordance with national criteria. Derogations may be granted by the relevant national central bank provided that the total commitment amount for all derogations in the country concerned does not exceed 2% of the total commitment.

For instance, it is possible that in those Member States in which credits are extended by a large number of relatively small credit institutions the derogations may lead to a large number of small credit institutions being exempted.

== Reported credits ==
Only credits extended to legal entities and other entities that are not natural persons fall under the scope of the data collection.

Loans and deposits are the only instruments that will be considered, with credit derivatives and off-balance-sheet items being excluded from the scope of the regulation.

Loans and deposits include:

- deposits other than reverse repurchase agreements
- overdrafts
- credit card debt
- revolving credit other than overdrafts and credit card debt
- credit lines other than revolving credit
- reverse repurchase agreements
- trade receivables
- financial leases
- other loans

=== Reporting threshold ===
A given instrument has to be reported if it is held by a debtor whose total commitment amount for all relevant instruments equals or exceeds €25,000 at the reporting reference date. In such cases, every single credit instrument of the debtor is subject to reporting, even if the commitment amount of an individual instrument does not exceed the threshold.

=== Reporting frequency ===
The frequency of reporting is monthly or quarterly dependent on data set.

== First reporting ==
The first reporting to AnaCredit relates to data for 30 September 2018 and covers both data reported monthly and data reported quarterly.

== See also ==
- European Banking Supervision
