= Japan Centers in Russia =

Japan Centers in Russia (Russian: Японские центры в России) refer to the several Japanese government-backed institutions in Russia where the Japanese language and culture courses are taught, and other Japan-related activities are supported in order to improve the Russo-Japanese relationship.

== Overview ==
Since 1994, the Japan Centers have been established by the Ministry of Foreign Affairs of the Japanese government in six cities of Russia in order to support the market-oriented economy that was emerging. For assisting the people who might be able to participate in the Russo-Japanese exchange of business, business management and Japanese language education courses are taught at these centers.

== See also ==
- Russo-Japanese Organizations for Trade and Investment
- Japan External Trade Organization (JETRO)
- Japan Foundation and its 22 centers outside of Japan, such as Japanese cultural House in Paris (French: Maison de la culture du Japon à Paris), Japanisches Kulturinstitut in Cologne, Istituto Giapponese di Cultura in Rome, etc.
