= Japan Center (Frankfurt) =

High-rise building in the Innenstadt district of Frankfurt, Germany

Coordinates: 50.1111°N 8.67239°E

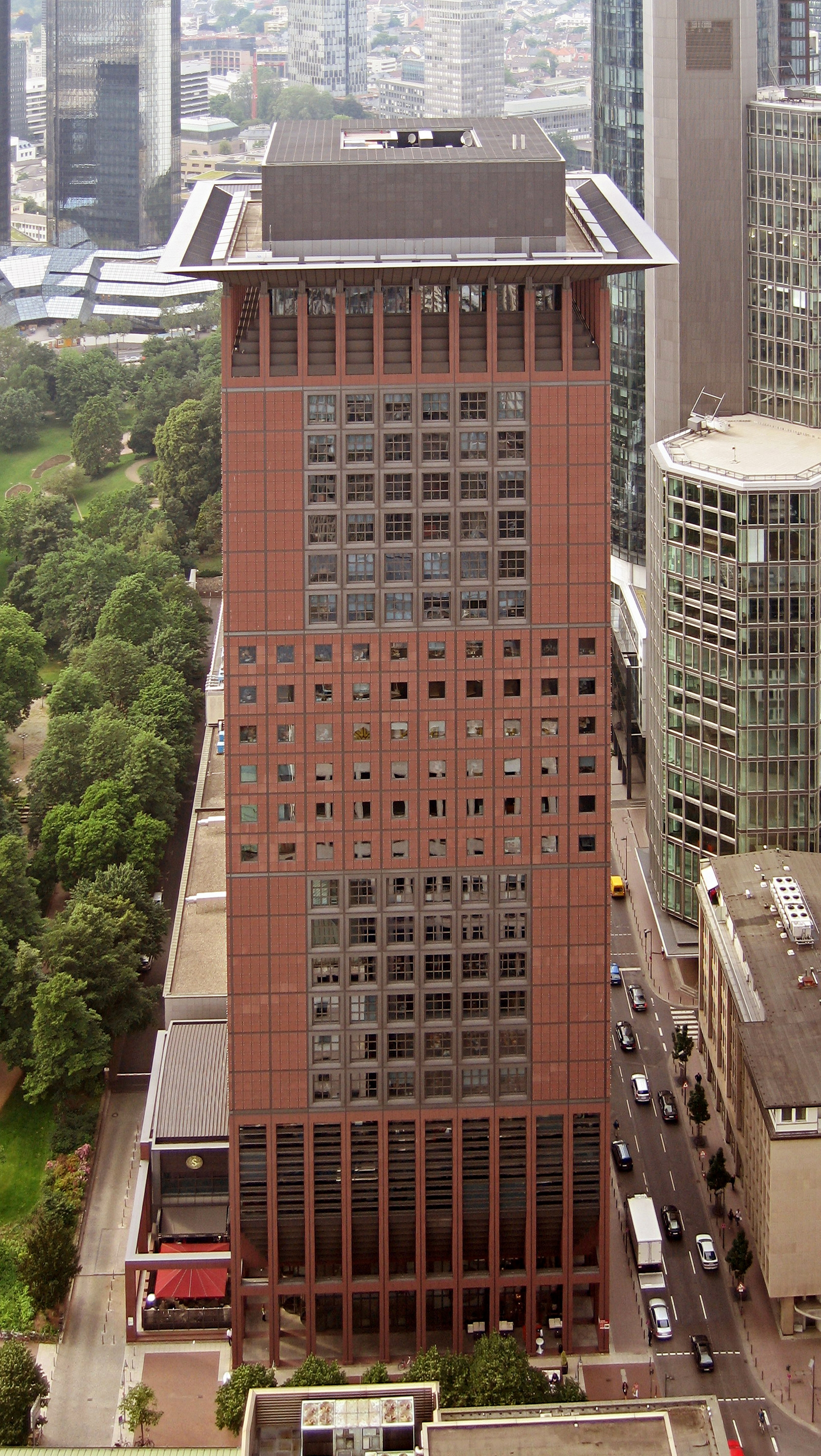
- Interactive map of the Japan Center area

General information
- Type: Commercial offices
- Location: Taunustor 2-4; Frankfurt; Hesse, Germany
- Opening: 1996

Height
- Roof: 115 m (377 ft)

Technical details
- Floor count: 27
- Floor area: 26,000 m^{2} (279,900 sq ft)

Design and construction
- Architect: Joachim Ganz

Japan Center is a high-rise building in the Innenstadt district of Frankfurt, Germany. The 115-meter-high office tower with 27 floors was completed in 1996.

== Design and construction ==
The building was designed by Berlin architect Joachim Ganz and cost approximately 200 million Euros. It was completed in 1996. The strict geometric forms based on the measure of a Japanese tatami mat (0.9 m × 1.8 m) and terra cotta stone cladding correspond to classical Japanese design. Its wide roof reminisces the shape of a Japanese stone lantern. The building outline is square (36.9 m × 36.9 m). Its central core houses nine elevators, two emergency staircases and utility shafts. The facade features large and small square windows housing open plan and single offices respectively.

== Interior ==
The ground floor is an arcade with shops and a Japanese restaurant. The 1st floor holds a multi-room conference center for up to 360 people. Utilities are housed in the 2nd floor followed by 21 office floors with a total area of 26,000 square meters. In the 25th floor, close to the roof, is another restaurant, which serves as a cafeteria and is used by a catering service as a venue. The topmost floors hold additional offices and utilities for the upper half of the building. The Japan Center office rooms are used by the European Central Bank and also housed (from 2014–16) the first headquarters of ECB Banking Supervision until it moved to the Eurotower.

== Gallery ==
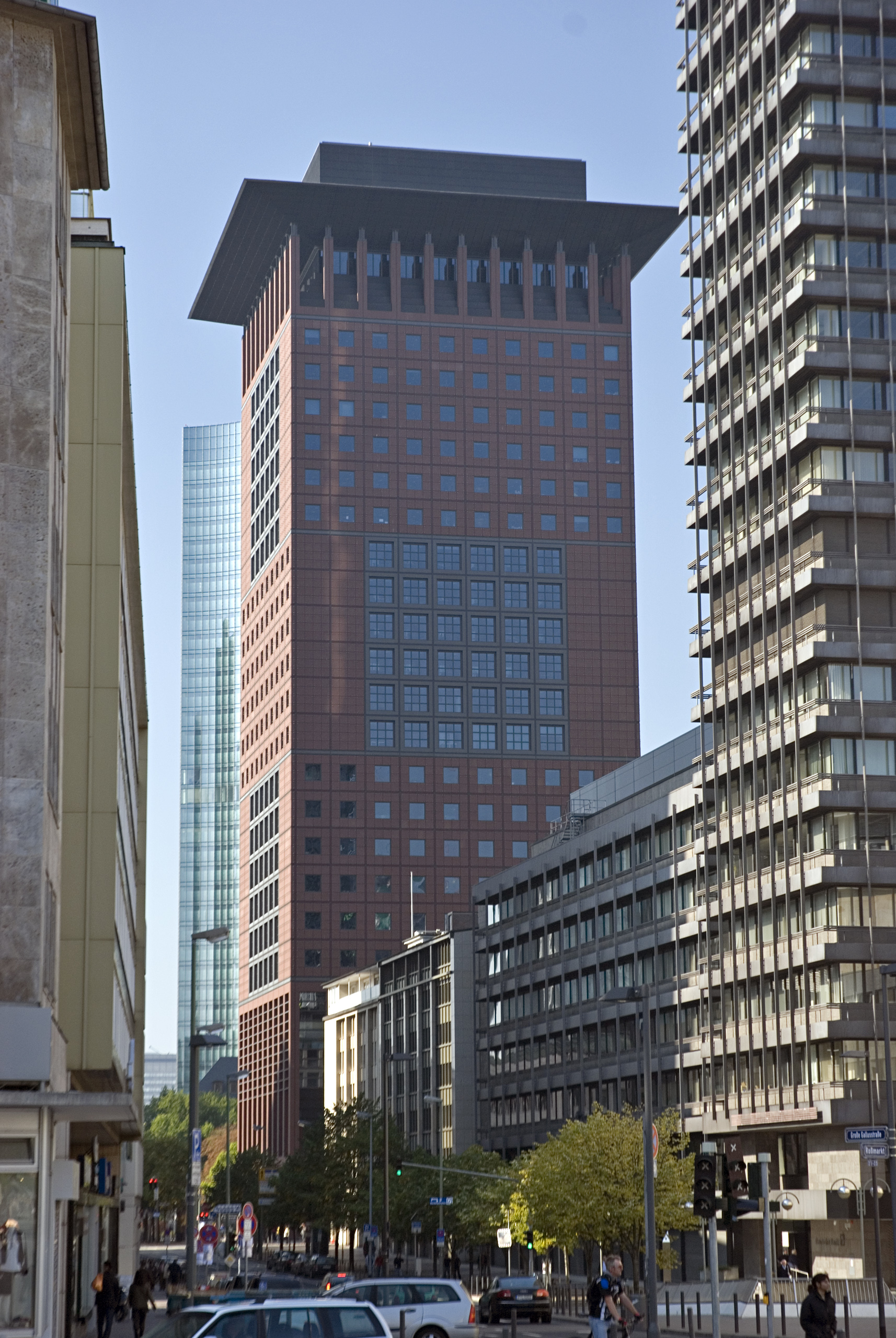

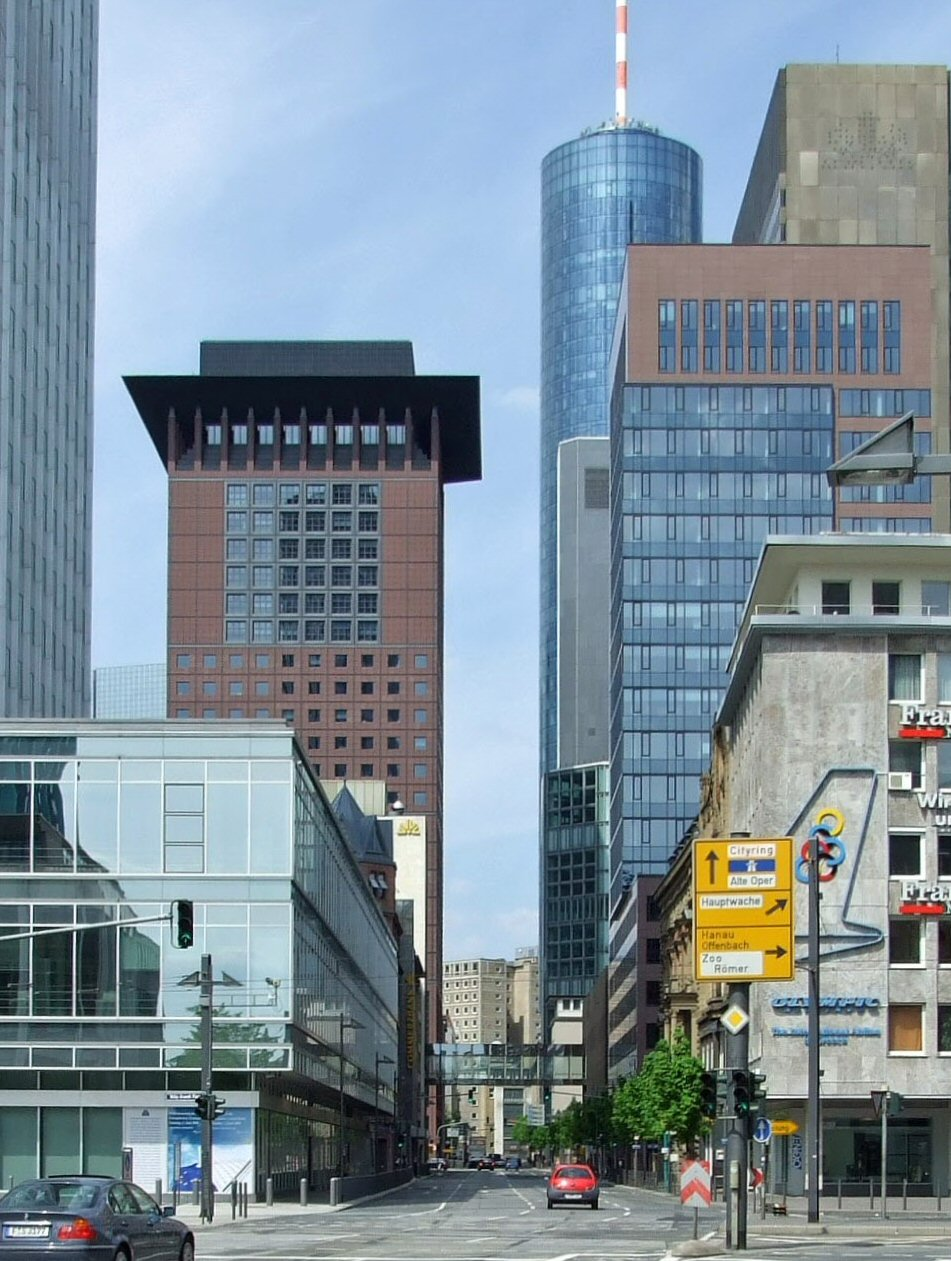

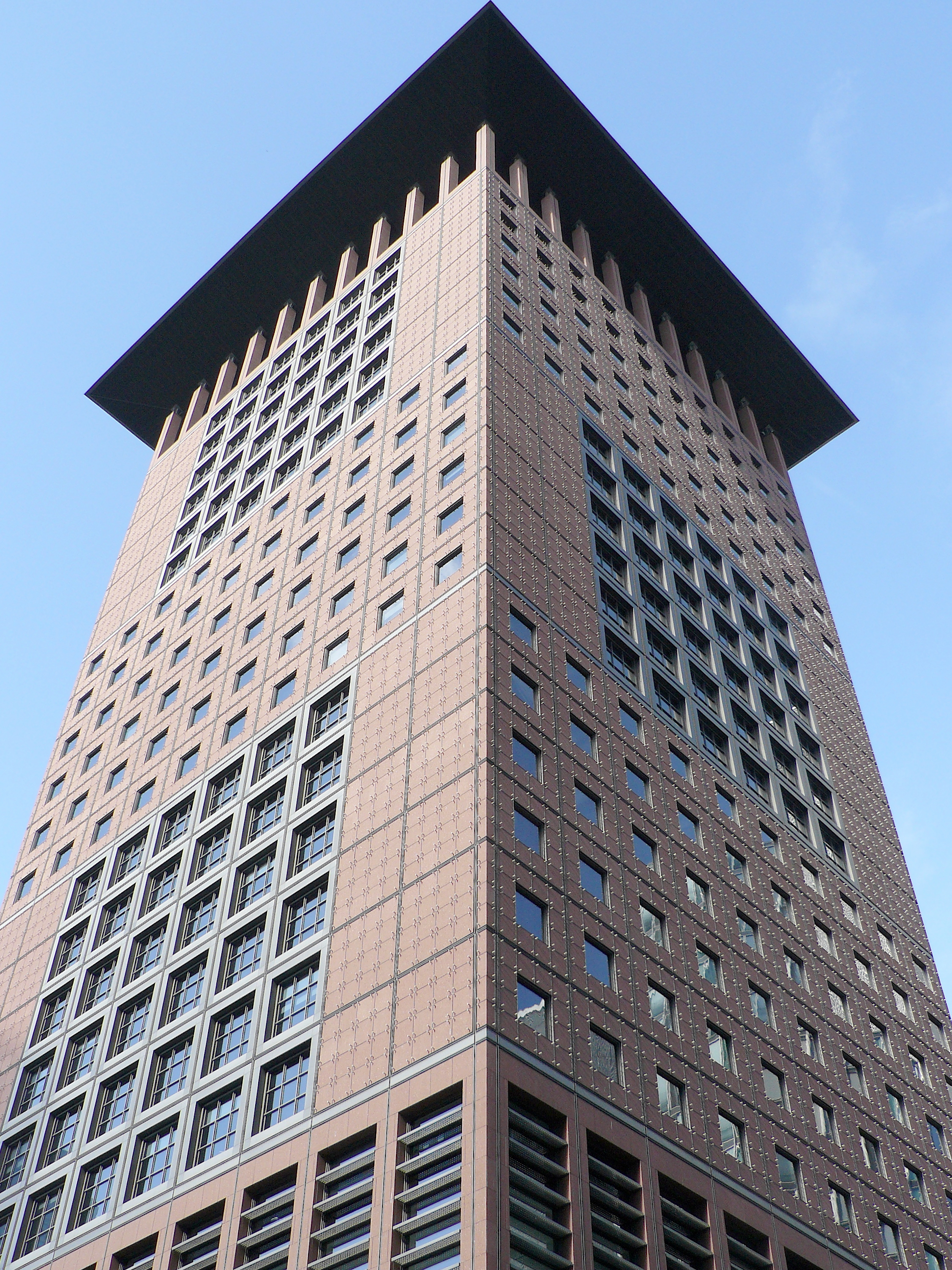

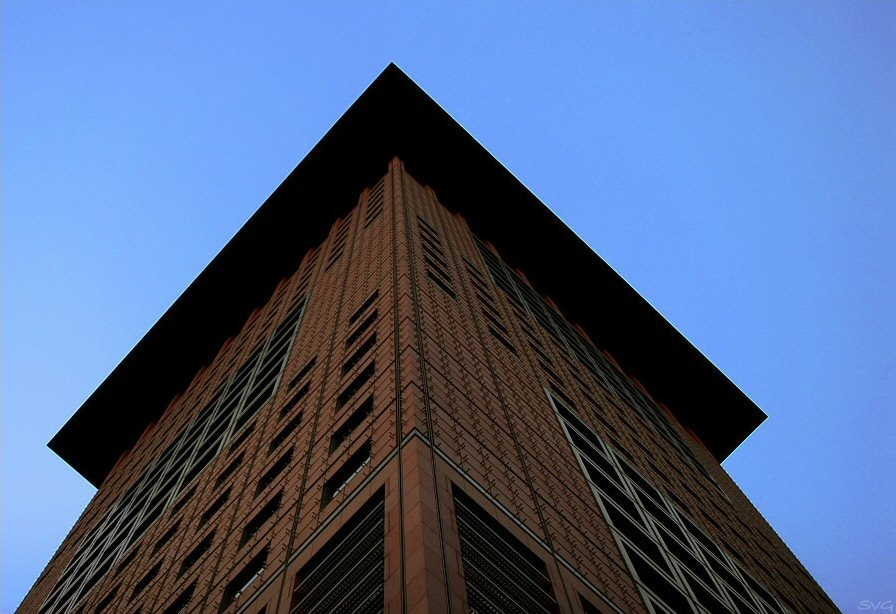

== See also ==
- List of tallest buildings in Frankfurt
- List of tallest buildings in Germany
