= Single Resolution Mechanism =

Resolution procedure of the EU banking union

Regulation 806/2014
- European Union regulation
- Title: Establishing uniform rules and a uniform procedure for the resolution of credit institutions and certain investment firms in the framework of a Single Resolution Mechanism and a Single Resolution Fund
- Applicability: All EU members. SRM provisions however only apply to Member States participating in the SSM.
- Made by: European Parliament and Council
- Made under: Article 114 of the TFEU.
- Journal reference: L225, 30.07.2014, p.1

History
- Date made: 15 July 2014
- Entry into force: 19 August 2014
- Applies from: Applies in its entirety from 1 January 2016, conditional a prior transfer of contributions to the Single Resolution Fund has been met. Otherwise, it will apply in its entirety from the first day of the month following the day where the payment requirement has been met.: Articles 1-4, 6, 30, 42-48, 49, 50(1)(a)+(b)+ (g) to (p), 50(3), 51, 52(1)+(4), 53(1)+(2), 56-59, 61-66, 80-84, 87-95 and 97-98, apply from 19 August 2014.; Articles 69(5), 70(6)+(7), and 71(3), which empower the Council to adopt implementing acts and the Commission to adopt delegated acts, apply from 1 November 2014.; Article 8+9 and all related provisions elsewhere in the regulation, which empowers the Board to collect information and cooperate with the national resolution authorities for the elaboration of resolution planning, apply from 1 January 2015.

Other legislation
- Amends: Regulation (EU) No 1093/2010

Agreement on the transfer and mutualisation of contributions to the Single Resolution Fund
- Parties to the Single Resolution Fund Within the eurozone Outside the eurozone (not applying the treaty) Signatories that have not ratified EU members which may accede to the treaty
- Type: Intergovernmental agreement
- Signed: 21 May 2014
- Location: Brussels, Belgium
- Effective: 1 January 2016
- Condition: Entry into force on the first day of the second month following the ratification by states representing 90% of the weighted vote of SSM and SRM participating states; but not before 1 January 2016
- Signatories: 26 EU member states (all except Sweden) including all 21 eurozone states
- Ratifiers: 24 / 26
- Depositary: General Secretariat of the Council

The Single Resolution Mechanism (SRM) is one of the pillars of the European Union's banking union. The Single Resolution Mechanism entered into force on 19 August 2014 and is directly responsible for the resolution of the entities and groups directly supervised by the European Central Bank as well as other cross-border groups. The centralised decision making is built around the Single Resolution Board (SRB) consisting of a chair, a Vice Chair, four permanent members, and the relevant national resolution authorities (those where the bank has its headquarters as well as branches and/or subsidiaries).

Upon notification from the ECB that a bank is failing or likely to fail, the Board will adopt a resolution scheme including relevant resolution tools and any use of the Single Resolution Fund, established by the SRM Regulation (EU) No 806/2014. The Single Resolution Fund helps to ensure a uniform administrative practice in the financing of resolution within the SRM.

A Single Resolution Fund (SRF) to finance the restructuring of failing credit institutions was established as an essential part of the SRM by a complementary intergovernmental agreement, after its ratification. If it is decided to resolve a bank facing serious difficulties, its resolution will be managed efficiently, at minimum costs to taxpayers and the real economy. In extraordinary circumstances, the Single Resolution Fund (SRF), financed by the banking sector itself, can be accessed. The SRF is established under the control of the SRB.

The available financial means of the Fund aims to equal at least 1% of the amount of the covered deposits of all credit institutions authorised in all of the Member States participating in the Banking Union. The SRF was built up over eight years, from 2016 until 2023, when it reached the target level of at least 1% of the amount of covered deposits of all the banks operating in the Banking Union. As of 31 December 2025, the SRF amounts to €81 billion, which equates 1% of covered deposits.

== History ==
=== Initial legislation ===
The SRM was enacted through a Regulation and an Intergovernmental Agreement (IGA) which are titled:

- Regulation of the European Parliament and of the Council establishing uniform rules and a uniform procedure for the resolution of credit institutions and certain investment firms in the framework of a Single Resolution Mechanism and a Single Bank Resolution Fund and amending Regulation (EU) No 1093/2010 of the European Parliament and of the Council
- Agreement on the transfer and mutualisation of contributions to the Single Resolution Fund.

The proposed Regulation was put forward by the European Commission in July 2013 to complement the first pillar of the banking union, namely European Banking Supervision. The details of some aspects of the functioning of the SRF, including the transfer and mutualisation of funds from national authorities to the centralized fund, was split off from the Regulation into the IGA due to concerns, especially by Germany, that they were incompatible with current EU treaties.

The European Commission argued that centralizing the resolution mechanism for the participating states will allow for more coordinated and timely decisions to be made on weak banks. Internal Market and Services Commissioner Michel Barnier stated that "by ensuring that supervision and resolution are aligned at a central level, whilst involving all relevant national players, and backed by an appropriate resolution funding arrangement, it will allow bank crises to be managed more effectively in the banking union and contribute to breaking the link between sovereign crises and ailing banks."

Ratings Agencies have stated their approval of the measure and believe it will cause European ratings and credit to rise as it will limit the impact of a bank failure. Critics have stated their concerns that this mechanism will result in sovereign states' taxpayers' money being used to pay off other nation's bank failures.

The Parliament and the Council of the European Union reached an agreement on the Regulation on 20 March 2014. The European Parliament approved the Regulation on 15 April 2014, and the Council followed suit on 14 July, leading to its entry into force on 19 August 2014. The SRM automatically applies to all SSM members, and states which do not participate in the SSM cannot participate in the SRM.

Some of the provisions of the Regulation were applied from 1 January 2015, but the authority to carry out bank resolution did not apply until 1 January 2016, and were subject to the entry into force of the IGA.

=== Intergovernmental agreement ===
The IGA was signed by 26 EU member states (all except Sweden and the United Kingdom, the latter which withdrew from the EU) on 21 May 2014 and is open to accession to any other EU member states. It was to enter into force on the first day of the second month following the deposit of instruments of ratification by states representing at least 90% of the weighted vote of SSM and SRM participating states, and was applied from 1 January 2016, since the Regulation had entered into force, but only to SSM and SRM participating states. The IGA states that the intention of the signatories is to incorporate the IGA's provisions into EU structures within 10 years.

As of 31 August 2025, 24 states, including all eurozone members, have ratified the intergovernmental agreement (IGA). A sufficient number of participating Member States, surpassing the 90% voting share of participating member states required for entry into force, ratified the IGA by 30 November, allowing the SRB to take over full responsibility for bank resolution as planned on 1 January 2016. The only eurozone states which had not completed their ratification at the time were Greece and Luxembourg. Greece subsequently did so in December, while Luxembourg followed suit in February 2016.

The ECB governing council decided on 24 June 2020 to establish a close cooperation agreement with the Bulgarian and Croatian central banks. The close cooperation agreements enter into force on 1 October 2020, at which point SRF agreement will apply to them.

| Member state | QM votes | QM weight (Note: Of participating states as of entry into force) | Ratification |
|---|---|---|---|
| France | 29 | 12.95% | 19 June 2015 |
| Germany | 29 | 12.95% | 28 October 2015 |
| Italy | 29 | 12.95% | 30 November 2015 |
| Poland | 27 | – | – |
| Spain | 27 | 12.05% | 15 October 2015 |
| Romania | 14 | – | 2 March 2017 |
| Netherlands | 13 | 5.80% | 11 November 2015 |
| Belgium | 12 | 5.36% | 27 November 2015 |
| Czech Republic | 12 | – | 15 February 2021 |
| Greece | 12 | 5.36% | 4 December 2015 |
| Hungary | 12 | – | 29 December 2015 |
| Portugal | 12 | 5.36% | 23 October 2015 |
| Austria | 10 | 4.46% | 17 November 2015 |
| Bulgaria | 10 | – | 13 December 2018 |
| Croatia | 7 | – | 15 September 2020 |
| Denmark | 7 | – | – |
| Finland | 7 | 3.13% | 24 June 2015 |
| Ireland | 7 | 3.13% | 26 November 2015 |
| Lithuania | 7 | 3.13% | 25 November 2015 |
| Slovakia | 7 | 3.13% | 4 February 2015 |
| Cyprus | 4 | 1.79% | 14 October 2015 |
| Estonia | 4 | 1.79% | 25 November 2015 |
| Latvia | 4 | 1.79% | 4 December 2014 |
| Luxembourg | 4 | 1.79% | 5 February 2016 |
| Slovenia | 4 | 1.79% | 25 November 2015 |
| Malta | 3 | 1.34% | 30 November 2015 |
| European Union | 313 (Note: 224 for participating states as of entry into force) | 100.00% (Note: QM weight of ratifying states as of entry into force) | 24 states (Note: Ratifying states) |

An updated EMU reform plan issued in June 2015 by the five presidents of the council, European Commission, ECB, Eurogroup and European Parliament outlined a roadmap for integrating the Fiscal Compact and Single Resolution Fund agreement into the framework of EU law by June 2017, and the intergovernmental European Stability Mechanism by 2025. Proposals by the European Commission to incorporate the substance of the Fiscal Compact into EU law and create a European Monetary Fund to replace the ESM were published in December 2017.

On 30 November 2020 the finance ministers at the Eurogroup agreed to amend the IGA and treaty establishing respectively the SRF and ESM. The reform proposal was blocked for months because of the veto of the Italian government. The ratification of the amendments by Member States is ongoing and, as of December 2023, Italy is the only Eurozone Member State that has not yet ratified the amendments. The proposed amendments include:

- The establishment of the ESM as a "backstop" to the Single Resolution Fund (SRF), through a revolving credit line.
- Reform of the ESM Governance
- Mandatory introduction of single-limb collective action clauses (CACs) in new euro area sovereign bonds issued
- Changes of eligibility criteria to the precautionary financial assistance instruments
- Clarifications and expansions of the ESM mandate on economic governance;

An amendment to the SRF Agreement (which would establish the ESM as a backstop to the SRF) was signed on 27 January 2021 by Member States, and its ratification is ongoing. As of June 2025, 22 states have ratified the amendment: among the 24 states that have ratified the intergovernmental agreement (IGA) enacting the SRM, only Italy and Czechia have not yet ratified the amendment.

== Functioning ==
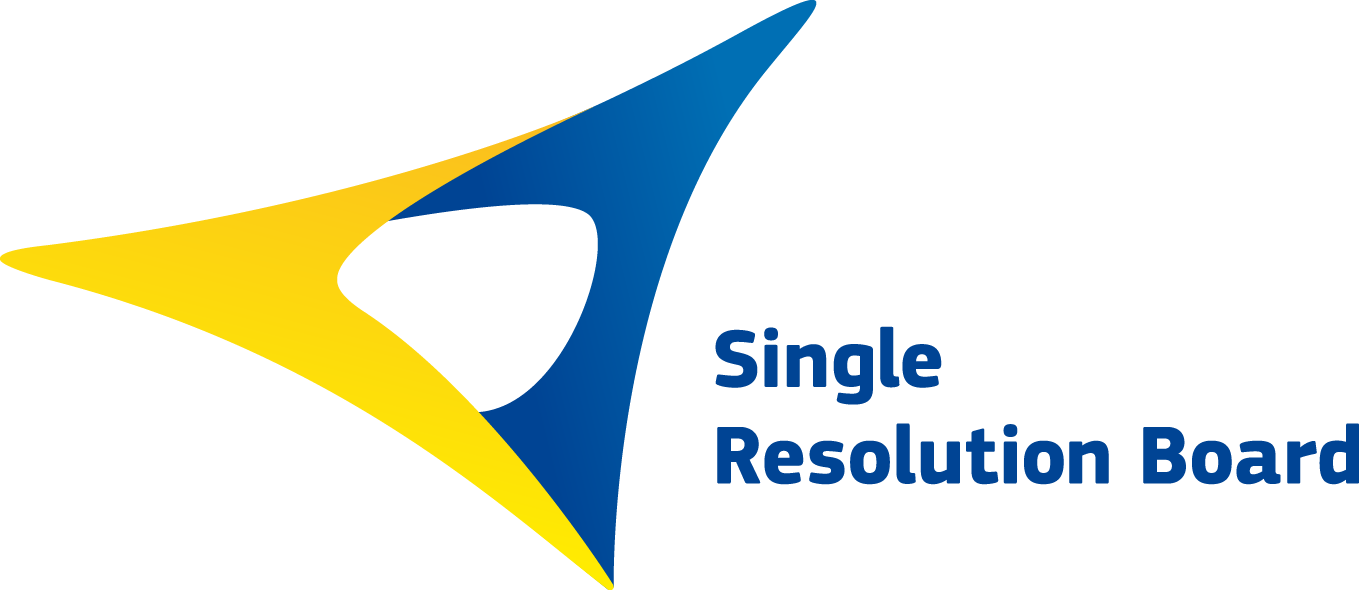
Single Resolution Board logo until 2023

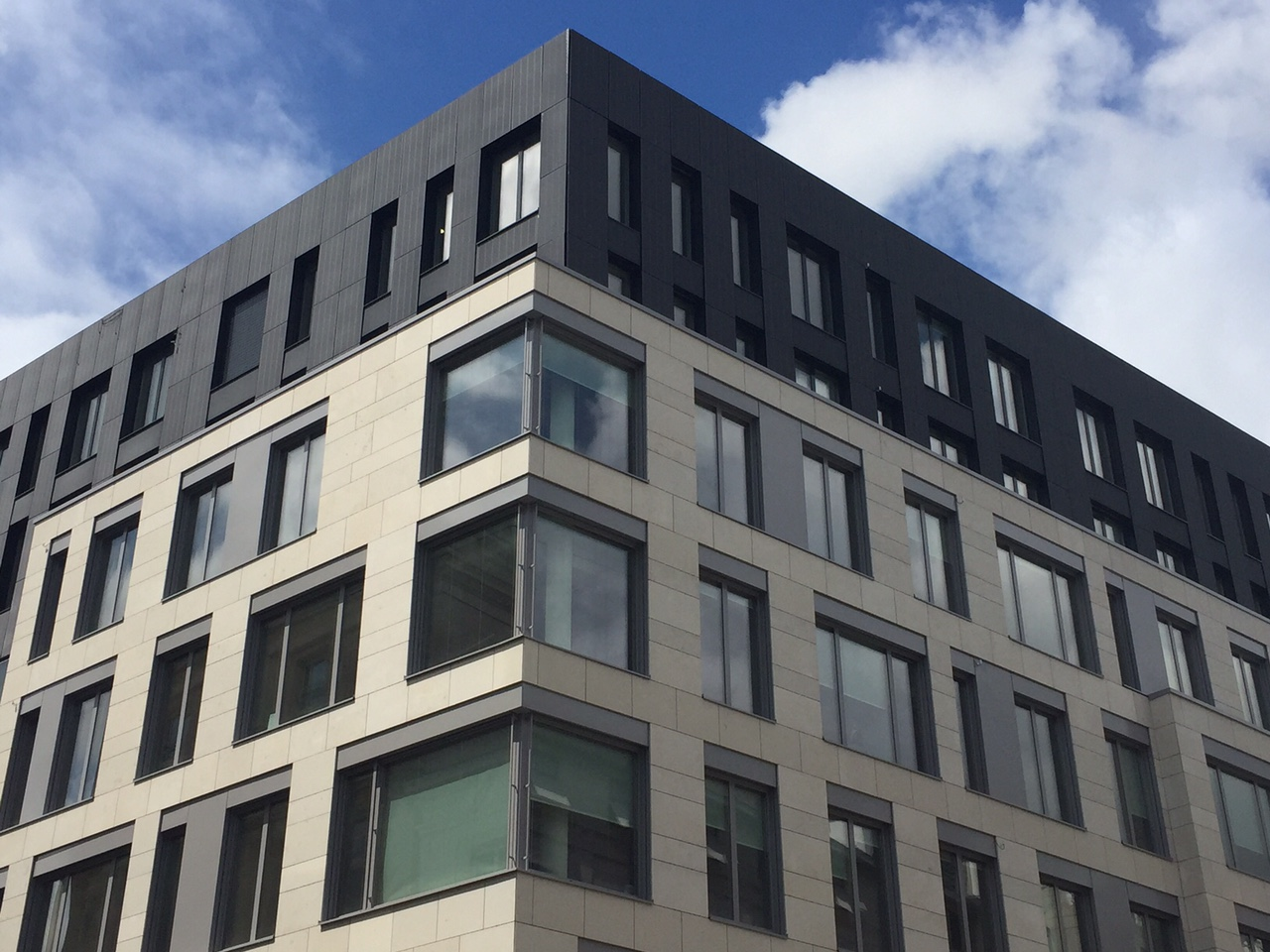
Single Resolution Board Headquarters by 2018 in 22 Treurenberg, Brussels

The SRM allows for troubled banks operating under the SSM (as well as other cross border groups) to be restructured with a variety of tools including bailout funds from the centralized SRF, valued at at least 1% of covered deposits of all credit institutions authorised in all the participating member states (estimated to be around 55 billion euros), which would be filled with contributions by participating banks during an eight-year establishment phase. This would help to alleviate the impact of failing banks on the sovereign debt of individual states. The SRM also handles the winding down of non-viable banks. The Single Resolution Board is directly responsible for the resolution of significant banks under ECB supervision, as well as other cross border groups, while national authorities will take the lead in smaller banks.

Like the SSM, the SRM Regulation will cover all banks in the eurozone, with other states eligible to join. The text of the Regulation approved by the European Parliament stipulates that all states participating in the SSM, including those non-eurozone states with a "close cooperation" agreement, will automatically be participants in the SRM. As of 2026, this includes all 21 eurozone states.

The Single Resolution Board (SRB) was established in 2014 by Regulation (EU) No 806/2014 on the Single Resolution Mechanism (SRM Regulation) and began work on 1 January 2015. It became fully responsible for resolution on 1 January 2016 and was henceforth the resolution authority for around 143 significant banking groups as well as any cross border banking group established within participating Member States.

== See also ==
- Single Resolution Board
- European Banking Supervision
- European banking union
- List of acronyms associated with the Eurozone crisis
