= European Banking Supervision =

Supranational banking supervisory framework

Agency overview
- Formed: 4 November 2014
- Jurisdiction: Eurozone
- Headquarters: Frankfurt, Germany
- Agency executive: Claudia Buch, Chair
- Website: www.bankingsupervision.europa.eu

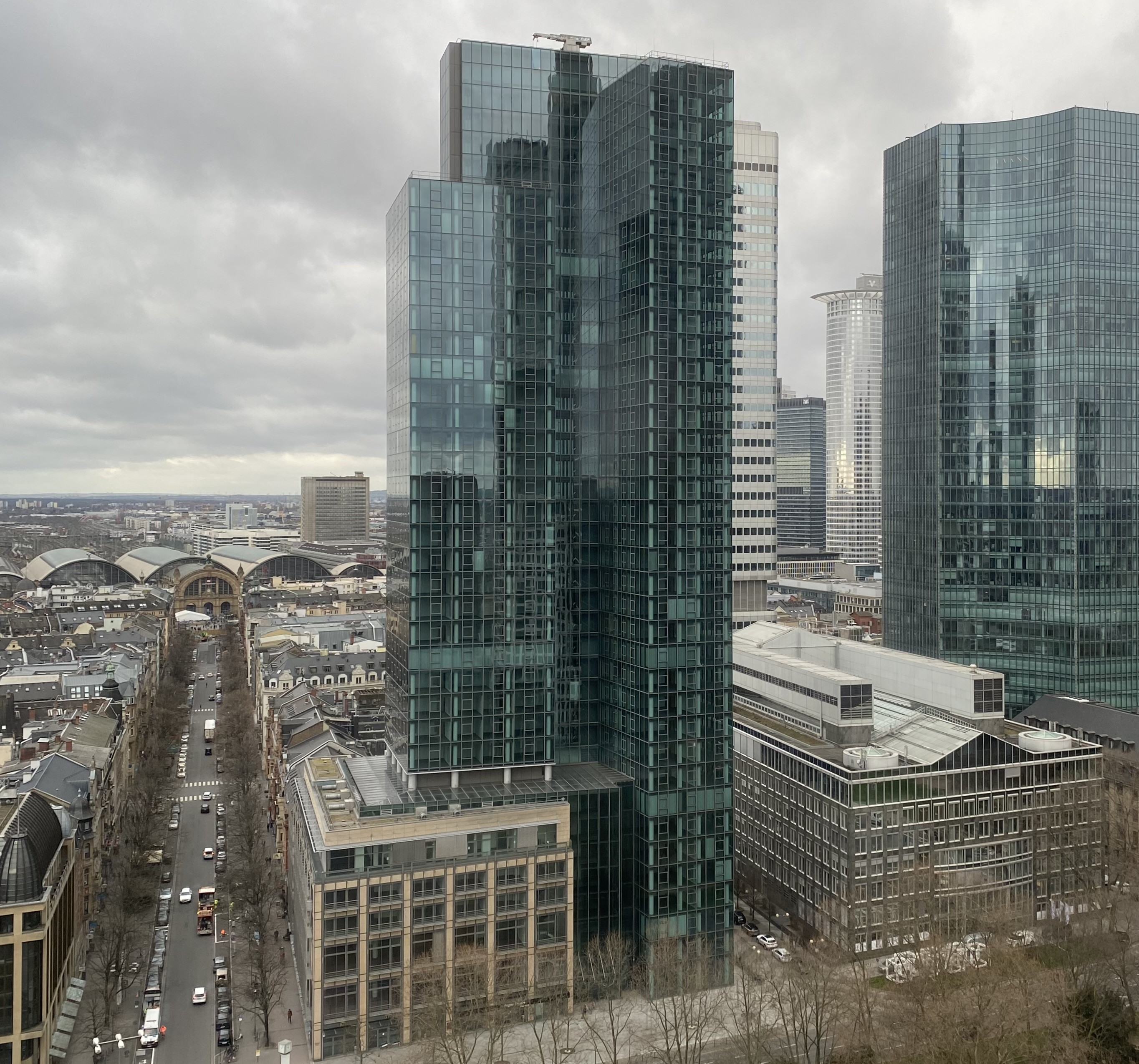
Gallileo tower in Frankfurt, home of ECB Banking Supervision since 2025

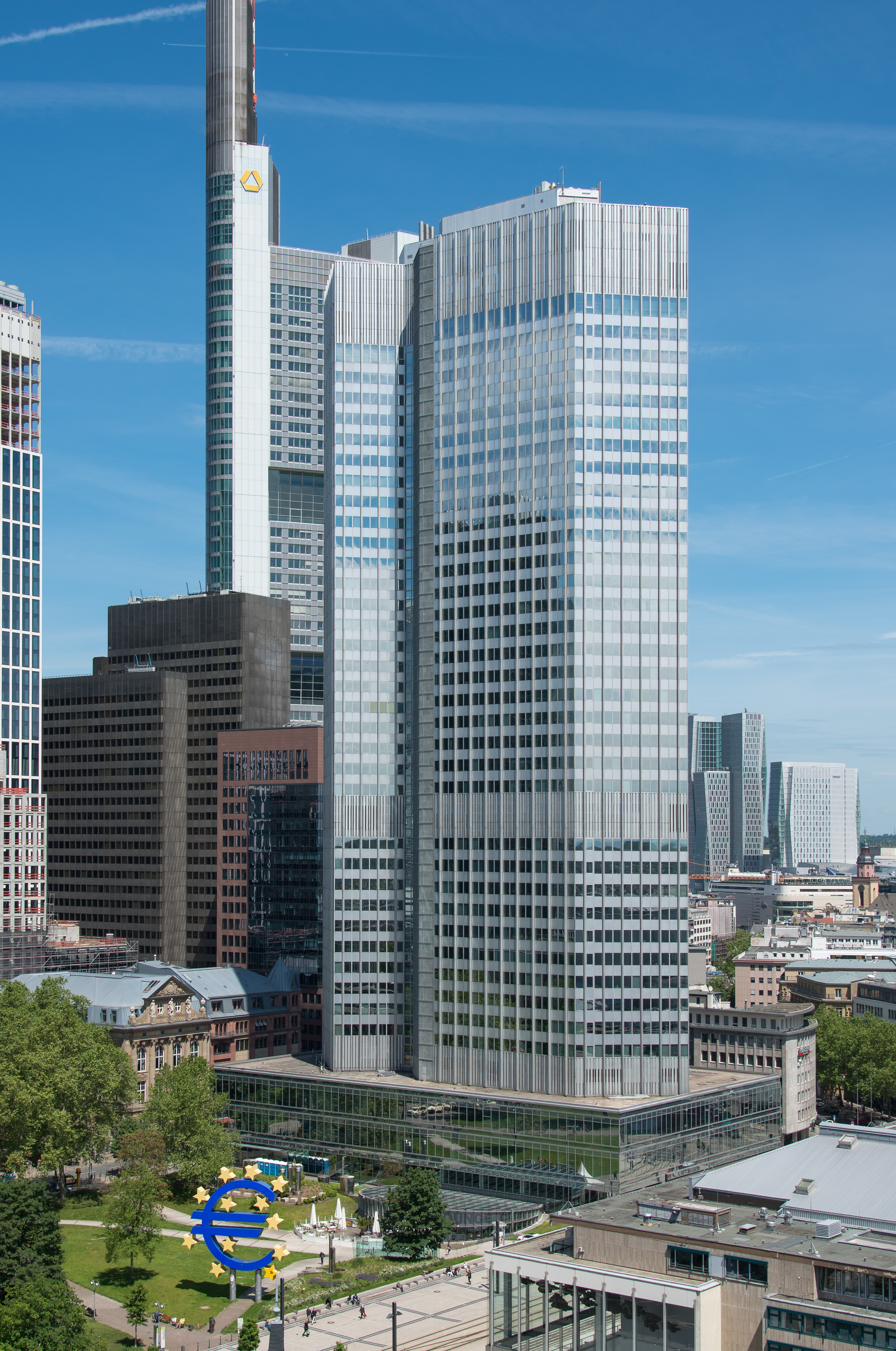
Eurotower in Frankfurt, home of ECB Banking Supervision 2016-2025

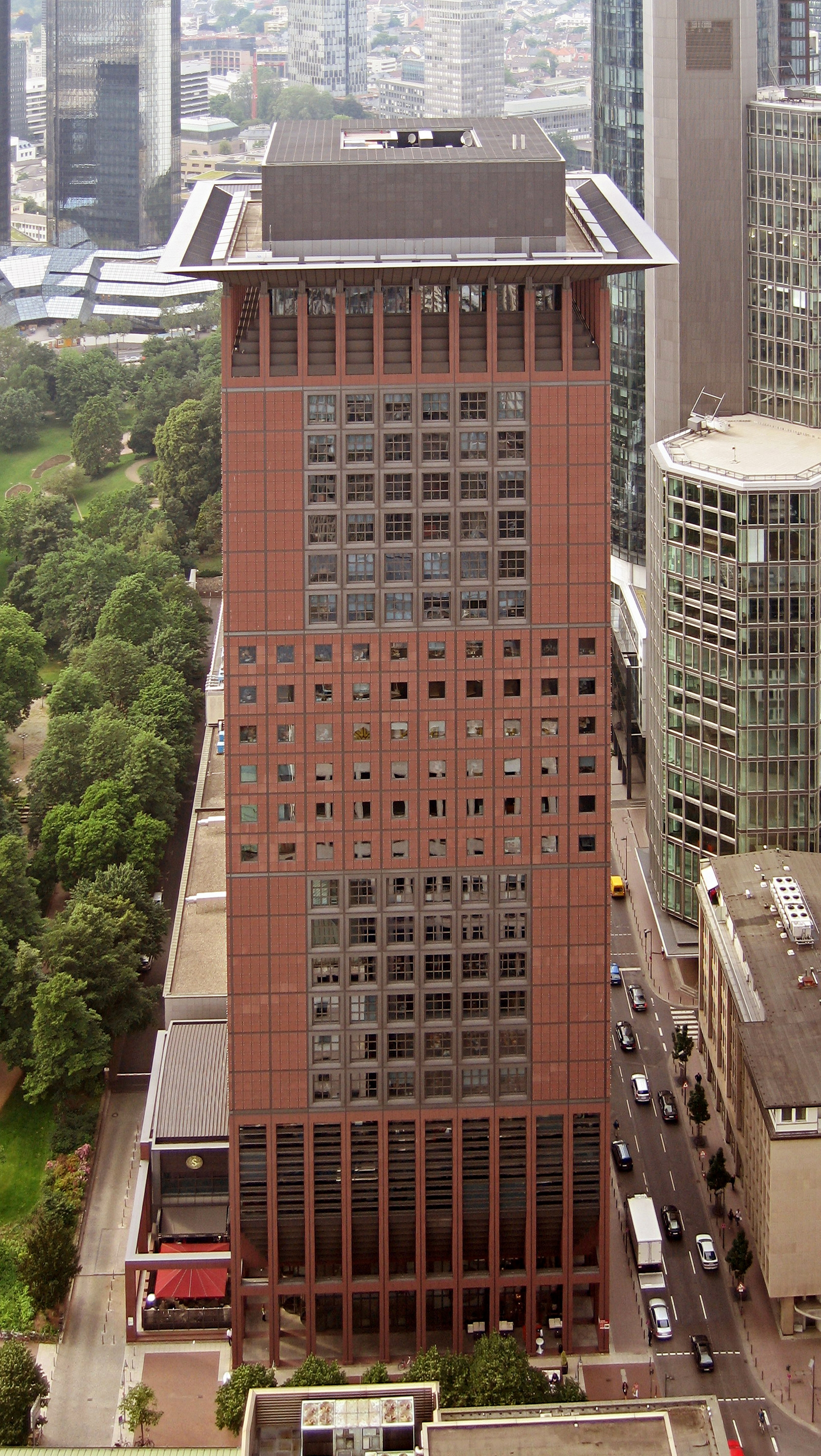
Japan Center in Frankfurt, home of ECB Banking Supervision 2014–2016

European Banking Supervision, formally known as the Single Supervisory Mechanism (SSM), is the policy framework for the prudential supervision of banks in the euro area. It is centered on the European Central Bank (ECB), whose supervisory arm is referred to as ECB Banking Supervision. EU member states outside of the euro area can also participate on a voluntary basis. European Banking Supervision was established by Regulation 1024/2013 of the Council, also known as the SSM Regulation, which also created its central (albeit not ultimate) decision-making body, the ECB Supervisory Board.

Under European Banking Supervision, the ECB directly supervises the larger banks that are designated as Significant Institutions. The other banks, known as Less Significant Institutions, are supervised by national banking supervisors ("national competent authorities") under supervisory oversight by the ECB. As of late 2022, the ECB directly supervised 113 Significant Institutions in the 21 countries within its geographical scope of authority, representing around 85% of the banking system's total assets (excluding financial infrastructures that are designated as LSIs such as Euroclear Bank in Belgium, Banque Centrale de Compensation in France, or Clearstream Banking AG and Clearstream Banking SA in Germany and Luxembourg).

European Banking Supervision represents the initial and so far most complete component of the broader banking union, a project initiated in 2012 to integrate banking sector policy in the euro area. The unfinished piece of the banking union agenda is about crisis management and resolution, for which the so-called Single Resolution Mechanism coexists with national arrangements for deposit insurance and other aspects of the bank crisis management framework. The policy agenda on the completion of the banking union, stalled since June 2022, also includes options for the regulatory treatment of sovereign exposures.

== History ==
=== Background and genesis ===
The question of supervising the European banking system arose long before the 2008 financial crisis. Shortly after the creation of the monetary union in 1999, a number of observers and policy-makers warned that the new monetary architecture would be incomplete, and therefore fragile, without at least some coordination of supervisory policies among euro members.

The first supervisory measure put in place at the EU level was the creation of the Lamfalussy Process in March 2001. It involved the creation of a number of committees in charge of overseeing regulations in the financial sector. The primary goal of these committees was to accelerate the integration of the EU securities market.

This approach was not binding for the European banking sector and had therefore little influence on the supervision of European banks. This can be explained by the fact that the European treaties did not allow the EU, at the time, to have real decision-making power on these matters. The idea of having to modify the treaties and of engaging in a vast debate on the Member States’ loss of sovereignty cooled down the ambitions of the Lamfalussy process. The financial and economic crisis of 2008 and its consequences in the European Union incentivized European leaders to adopt a supranational mechanism of banking supervision.

The main objective of the new supervisory mechanism was to restore confidence in financial markets. The idea was also to avoid having to bail out banks with public money in case of future economic crises.

To implement this new system of supervision, the President of the European Commission in 2008, José Manuel Barroso, asked a group of experts to look at how the EU could best regulate the European banking market. This group was led by Jacques de Larosière, a French senior officer who held, until 1978, the position of Director General of the Treasury in France. He was also President of the International Monetary Fund from 1978 to 1987, President of the "Banque de France" from 1987 to 1993 and President of the European Bank for Reconstruction and Development from 1993. On a more controversial stance, Jacques de Larosière has also been a close advisor of BNP Paribas.

This group led by de Larosière delivered a report highlighting the major failure of European banking supervision pre-2008. Based on this report, the European institutions have set up in 2011 "The European System of Financial Supervision" (ESFS). Its primary objective was:

"to ensure that the rules applicable to the financial sector are adequately implemented, to preserve financial stability and ensure confidence in the financial system as a whole".

The ESFS brought together, in an unconventional manner, the European and the national supervisory authorities.

Despite the creation of this new mechanism, the European Commission considered that, having a single currency, the EU needed to go further in the integration of its banking supervision practices. The idea was that the mere collaboration of national and European supervisory authorities was not enough and that the EU needed a single supervisory authority. The European Commission therefore suggested the creation of the Single Supervisory Mechanism.

This proposal was debated at the Eurozone summit that took place in Brussels on 28 and 29 June 2012. Herman Van Rompuy, who was president of the European Council at the time, had worked upstream with the president of the commission, the president of the Central Bank and of the Eurogroup on a preliminary report used as a basis for discussions at the summit. In compliance with the decisions made then, the European Commission published a proposal for a council regulation establishing European banking supervision in September 2012.

The European Central Bank welcomed the proposal. Chancellor of Germany Angela Merkel questioned "the capacity of the ECB to monitor 6,000 banks". The Vice-President of the European Commission at the time, Olli Rehn, responded to that concern that the majority of European banks would still be monitored by national supervisory bodies, while the ECB "would assume ultimate responsibility for the supervision, in order to prevent banking crises from escalating".

The European Parliament voted in favour of the legislative proposal on the 12th of September 2013. The Council of the European Union gave its own approval on the 15th of October 2013. The SSM Regulation entered into force on the 4th of November 2014.

The fact that European Banking Supervision is formulated as a regulation and not a directive is important. Indeed, a regulation is legally binding and Member States do not have the choice, unlike for directives, of how to transpose it under national law.

=== Entry into force ===
The ECB published its first comprehensive assessment on 26 October 2014. This financial health check covered the 130 most significant credit institutions in the 19 Eurozone states representing assets worth €22 trillion (equal to 82% of total banking assets of the eurozone).

The supervision report included:

1. The results of an Asset Quality Review (AQR) - assessing capital shortfalls (i.e., a failure to meet the minimum capital requirement) of each significant credit institution on 31 December 2013.
2. Assessment of potential capital shortfalls when subject to a stress test based on the baseline scenario - being the latest economic forecast published by the Commission for the eurozone in 2014–16.
3. Assessment of potential capital shortfalls when subject to a stress test based on an adverse scenario - which was developed by the European Systemic Risk Board in cooperation with the National Competent Authorities, the EBA and the ECB.

Based on these three criteria, the review found that a total of 105 out of the 130 assessed banks met all minimum capital requirements on 31 December 2013. A total of 25 banks were found to suffer from capital shortfalls on 31 December 2013, of which 12 managed to cover these capital shortfalls through raising extra capital in 2014. The remaining 13 banks were asked to submit a recapitalization plan for 2015.

SSM participating banks with a CET1 capital shortfall, as of the status of its assets on 31 December 2013
Bank Name	State	CET1 ratio starting point	CET1 ratio post AQR	CET1 ratio baseline scenario	CET1 ratio adverse scenario	Capital shortfall on 31 Dec 2013 (€ billion)	Net eligible capital raised during 2014 (€ billion)	Capital shortfall post net capital raised (€ billion)
Eurobank¹	Greece	10.6%	7.8%	2.0%	-6.4%	4.63	2.86	1.76
Banca Monte dei Paschi di Siena	Italy	10.2%	7.0%	6.0%	-0.1%	4.25	2.14	2.11
National Bank of Greece¹	Greece	10.7%	7.5%	5.7%	-0.4%	3.43	2.50	0.93
Banca Carige	Italy	5.2%	3.9%	2.3%	-2.4%	1.83	1.02	0.81
Cooperative Central Bank Ltd	Cyprus	-3.7%	-3.7%	-3.2%	-8.0%	1.17	1.50	0.00
Banco Comercial Português	Portugal	12.2%	10.3%	8.8%	3.0%	1.14	-0.01	1.15
Bank of Cyprus	Cyprus	10.4%	7.3%	7.7%	1.5%	0.92	1.00	0.00
Volksbank Group	Austria	11.5%	10.3%	7.2%	2.1%	0.86	0.00	0.86
Permanent tsb	Ireland	13.1%	12.8%	8.8%	1.0%	0.85	0.00	0.85
Veneto Banca	Italy	7.3%	5.7%	5.8%	2.7%	0.71	0.74	0.00
Banco Popolare	Italy	10.1%	7.9%	6.7%	4.7%	0.69	1.76	0.00
Banca Popolare di Milano	Italy	7.3%	6.9%	6.5%	4.0%	0.68	0.52	0.17
Banca Popolare di Vicenza	Italy	9.4%	7.6%	7.5%	3.2%	0.68	0.46	0.22
Piraeus Bank	Greece	13.7%	10.0%	9.0%	4.4%	0.66	1.00	0.00
Credito Valtellinese	Italy	8.8%	7.5%	6.9%	3.5%	0.38	0.42	0.00
Dexia²	Belgium	16.4%	15.8%	10.8%	5.0%	0.34	0.00	0.34
Banca Popolare di Sondrio	Italy	8.2%	7.4%	7.2%	4.2%	0.32	0.34	0.00
Hellenic Bank	Cyprus	7.6%	5.2%	6.2%	-0.5%	0.28	0.10	0.18
Münchener Hypothekenbank	Germany	6.9%	6.9%	5.8%	2.9%	0.23	0.41	0.00
AXA Bank Europe	Belgium	15.2%	14.7%	12.7%	3.4%	0.20	0.20	0.00
C.R.H. - Caisse de Refinancement de l'Habitat	France	5.7%	5.7%	5.7%	5.5%	0.13	0.25	0.00
Banca Popolare dell'Emilia Romagna	Italy	9.2%	8.4%	8.3%	5.2%	0.13	0.76	0.00
Nova Ljubljanska banka^{3}	Slovenia	16.1%	14.6%	12.8%	5.0%	0.03	0.00	0.03
Liberbank	Spain	8.7%	7.8%	8.5%	5.6%	0.03	0.64	0.00
Nova Kreditna Banka Maribor^{3}	Slovenia	19.6%	15.7%	12.8%	4.4%	0.03	0.00	0.03
Total	-	10.0%	8.4%	7.2%	2.1%	24.62	18.59	9.47
Notes: ¹ These banks have a shortfall on a static balance sheet projection, but will have dynamic balance sheet projections taken into account in determining their final capital requirements. Under the dynamic balance sheet assumption, these banks have no or practically no shortfall taking into account net capital already raised. ² Taking into account the orderly resolution plan of this institution, which benefits from a State guarantee, there is no need to proceed with additional capital raising.^{3} The impact on 2014 of the restructuring measures already taken to improve structural profitability and the maintenance of retained earnings in banks will cover the shortfalls identified.

This is the only time where a comprehensive assessment has been done for the 130 banks supervised by the ECB. Since 2014, only a few numbers of banks have been comprehensively assessed by the ECB: 13 in 2015, 4 in 2016 and 7 in 2019. These comprehensive assessments are conducted either when a bank is recognized as significant or when deemed necessary (i.e., in case of exceptional circumstances or when a non-Eurozone country joins the mechanism). Comprehensive assessments require too much resources for them to be conducted annually.

Other supervision tools are therefore used on a more regular basis in order to assess how banks would cope with potential economic shocks. As required by EU law and as part of the SREP, the ECB carries out annual stress tests on supervised banks. In 2016, a stress test was performed on 51 banks, covering 70% of EU banking assets. These banks entered the process with an average Common Equity Tier 1 (CET1, i.e., percentage of Tier 1 capital held by banks) ratio of 13%, higher than the 11.2% of 2014. The test showed that, with one exception, all the assessed banks exceeded the benchmark used in 2014 in terms of CET1 capital level (5.5%). The results of this stress test show that, in 2016, EU banks had a better potential of resilience and shock absorption than in 2014. In 2018, two types of stress tests were performed: an EBA stress test for 33 banks and a SSM SREP stress test for 54 banks. The aggregate results of those tests show that, in 2018, both sets of banks had again strengthened their capital base compared to 2016, increasing their potential of resistance to financial shocks. Due to the coronavirus pandemic, the 2020 stress test has been postponed to 2021. The results of this test should be published by the end of June 2021.

== Organization ==
Regulation 1024/2013 ("SSM Regulation")
- European Union regulation
- Title: Conferring specific tasks on the European Central Bank concerning policies relating to the prudential supervision of credit institutions
- Applicability: All EU member states. However, only eurozone states and EU member states with "close cooperation agreements" are subject to the supervision tasks conferred to ECB.
- Made by: Council of the European Union
- Made under: Article 127(6) of the TFEU.
- Journal reference: OJ L287, 29.10.2013, p.63–89

History
- Date made: 15 October 2013
- Entry into force: 3 November 2013
- Implementation date: 4 November 2014

=== Geographical scope ===
All 21 eurozone member states automatically participate in European Banking Supervision. Bulgaria, being the latest country to join the Eurozone on 1 January 2026, was accordingly added to the scope of application of European Banking Supervision.

Under the European Treaties, non-Eurozone countries do not have the right to vote in the ECB's Governing Council and, in return, are not bound by its decisions. As a result, non-Eurozone countries cannot become full members of the banking union (i.e., they cannot have the same rights and obligations as Eurozone members). However, non-Eurozone EU member states can enter into a "close cooperation agreement" with the ECB. This procedure is organised by article 7 of the SSM regulation (Council regulation (EU) No 1024/2013) and the ECB decision 2014/510. In effect, these agreements imply the supervision of banks in these signatory countries by the ECB. A close cooperation agreement can be ended either by the ECB or by the participating non-Eurozone member state. For example, both Bulgaria and Croatia had close cooperation agreements with the ECB prior to joining the eurozone.

=== ECB Banking Supervision ===
The European Central Bank (ECB) has the leadership in European banking supervision. A strict administrative separation is foreseen between the ECB's monetary and supervisory tasks. However, final decision-making on both matters takes place in the same body: the Governing Council.

The Governing Council is the main decision-making entity of the ECB. It comprises the members of the Executive Board of the European Central Bank and the governors of all national central banks of the Eurozone's member states. The Governing council is in charge, based on the opinion drafted by the Supervisory Board, of taking formal decisions with regard to its supervisory mandate.

The Supervisory Board is organised by article 26 of the SSM regulation (Council regulation (EU) No 1024/2013). It is composed of all national participating supervisors, a chair, vice-chair and four ECB representatives. These members meet every three weeks in order to draft supervisory decisions then submitted to the Governing Council.

The Supervisory Board is assisted in the preparation of its meetings by a Steering Committee. This committee gathers the Chair and the Vice-Chair of the Supervisory Board, an ECB representative (Edouard Fernandez-Bollo since 2019) as well as five deputies of national supervisors.

=== Division of labour between ECB Banking Supervision and national competent authorities ===
A division of labour has been established between the ECB and national supervisors. Banks deemed significant will be supervised directly by the ECB. Even though the ECB has the authority to take over the direct supervision of any bank, smaller banks will usually continue to be monitored directly by their national authorities. A total of 115 banks are currently being supervised by the ECB; all other banks are supervised by their national supervisor.

A bank is considered significant when it meets any of the following criteria:

- The value of its assets exceeds €30 billion;
- The value of its assets exceeds both €5 billion and 20% of the GDP of the member state in which it is located;
- The bank is among the three most significant banks of the country in which it is located;
- The bank has large cross-border activities;
- The bank receives, or has applied for, assistance from eurozone bailout funds (i.e., the European Stability Mechanism or European Financial Stability Facility).

This significance status is subject to change due to, for example, mergers and acquisitions. In 2020, two additional banks (LP Group B.V. in the Netherlands and Agri Europe Cyprus in Slovenia) have joined the list of banks supervised by the ECB.

=== Joint supervisory teams ===
Joint Supervisory Teams (JST), composed of members of the ECB's staff, national competent supervisors and experts in the banking field, make the link between the national and supranational levels. There is a JST for each significant banking institution. They act as supporting bodies, responsible mainly for the coordination, control and evaluation of supervisory missions.

== Missions and outcomes ==
=== Supervisory Review and Evaluation Process ===
The Supervisory Review and Evaluation Process, also known as ‘SREP’, is a periodic assessment of the risks taken by European banks. This process, undertaken annually by supervisors from the ECB and Joint Supervisory Teams, is an essential element of the implementation of the Single Supervisory Mechanism. The aim of the SREP is to make sure that banks remain safe and reliable; that any factors that could affect their capital and liquidity are under control. Today, the capital and liquidity levels of banks are then directly subject to an ECB monitoring system while beforehand it was heterogeneously done at a national level.

This evaluation is based on the monitoring of four different areas:

- Business Model – assessment of the bank's strategy and its main activities;
- Internal Governance – examination of the organizational structure and the management;
- Risks to capital – close analysis of risks linked to credits, markets, interest rates, and operations;
- Risks to liquidity – zoom on whether the banks have sufficient cash to cover their short-term needs.

In addition, each year, the European Central Bank is, under European Union law, obliged to perform at least one stress test on all supervised banks. This test will be part of the annual SREP cycle. Stress tests are computer-simulated techniques which evaluate the capacity of banks to cope with potential financial and economic shocks. Annual SREP cycles are based on data from the previous year and after each cycle, there is an individual evaluation. Based on these assessments and simulations, supervisors write a report on the vulnerability of European banks, with a score ranging from 1 (low risk) to 4 (high risks), and list concrete measures for these banks to take. These measures can be quantitative - related to capital or liquidity, or qualitative (e.g., a change in the management structure or the need of holding more capital especially in times of financial crisis). These actions shall normally be fulfilled by the following year. In case of non-compliance with these requirements, the ECB can charge a fine up to the double of the profits (or losses) which have been generated (or caused) by the breach and that can amount up to 10% of these banks’ annual turnover. The ECB can also request national authorities to open proceedings against these banks. In the worst-case scenario, when a bank is likely to fail, the second pillar of the European Banking Union, the Single Resolution Mechanism, enters into play. Eventually, even though the methodology and the timeframe are identical for banks, the actions to take can significantly differ among them as well as the sanctions.

==== Capital requirements ====
As banks can take considerable risks, holding capital is essential to absorb potential losses, avoid bankruptcies and secure people's deposits. The amount of capital banks should hold is proportional to the risks they take. This is closely monitored by the supervisory authorities.

Since 2016, if the results of the SREP for a bank do not reflect a proper coverage of the risks, the ECB may impose additional capital requirements to those required by the Basel agreement. This agreement provides a minimum capital requirement (called Pillar 1 requirement) of 8% of banks' risk-weighted assets. Since Basel II, extra requirements (called Pillar 2 requirements) can be set in order to cover additional risks. This second category of requirements is divided in two:

- Pillar 2 Requirement (P2R): requirements in terms of risk sensitivity and flexibility that must be fulfilled at all times;
- Pillar 2 Guidance (P2G): identification of the levels of capital to be maintained by banks in the longer run.

Finally, Basel III provides additional capital buffers covering more specific risks.

==== Non-performing loans ====
European Banking Supervision has been actively involved in the making of non-performing loans action plans. In the ECB guidance recommendations, the SSM, along with the European Banking Authority (EBA), have introduced a new definition of Non-Performing Loans (NPLs) that relates to the optimisation of the disposal of the NPLs by the banks. The main purpose is to integrate the multidimensional framework that the banks use in their evaluation process in the comprehensive assessment by the Supervisory Authority.

A bank loan is non-performing when the 90-day period is exceeded without the borrower paying the due amount or the agreed interest. If customers do not follow the agreed upon repayment terms for 90 days or more, the bank must further protect itself by increasing its equity reserve in the event the loan is not paid. The purpose of this procedure is to increase the bank's resilience to shocks by sharing the risk with the private sector. In other words, addressing the problems associated with PNPs in the future is paramount to consolidating the banking union, while developing lending activity.

The new provisions put in place a "prudential backstop," or minimum common loss guarantee for the reserve funds that banks set up to deal with losses from future non-performing loans. If a bank fails to meet this agreed minimum level, deductions are made directly from its capital.

=== Other mandates ===
In addition to the core SREP process, the ECB is also in charge of assessing banks’ acquisition of qualifying holdings, in accordance with Regulation 1024/2013, Art. 4.

=== European Banking Supervision and banking consolidation ===
Before the 2008 financial crisis, an increasing number of banks were merging across Europe. This trend stopped as a result of the crisis: between 2008 and 2017, while we saw a decline in the number of cross-border M&As, domestic consolidations (i.e., between two national institutions) rose. In 2016, there were about 6 000 banks in the Eurozone, most of which with a clear focus on their domestic market. Today, the European banking landscape is composed of banks with a smaller market share at the EU level than what can be observed in the United States. As a result, the European market is said to be more fragmented and therefore less competitive than in the US or Asia.

Cross-border mergers in banking would help banks to diversify their portfolio and, therefore, better recover from localized shocks in the economy. On the other hand, spreading risks across different geographies could also be a threat to the stability of financial markets: one might, indeed, worry of a potential effect of contagion between regions. Such transactions could also lead to the creation of groups regarded as "Too big to fail", which, in case of systemic crises, would require significant support from the public purse. Following the terrible consequences of the Lehman Brothers’ fall in 2008, public authorities seem committed to avoid the collapse of other systemic banks. One of the side effects of these public guarantees is to encourage moral hazard: protected by a public net, these financial institutions are incentivized to adopt riskier behaviors. As this opposition of opinions illustrates, if cross-border mergers might have the potential of reducing the exposure of individual firms to localized shocks, studies show that they also increase systemic risks on financial markets.

In the attempt to mitigate those risks, the ECB is, since 2013, responsible (as part of the Single Monitoring Mechanism), with the European Commission, for assessing the soundness of banking mergers (Council Regulation No 1024/2013, Art. 4). While the European Commission is in charge of checking the impacts such transactions will have on competition and, therefore, on consumers, the ECB is tasked to monitor the risks entailed by the suggested consolidations. If a transaction includes the acquisition of more than 10% of a bank's shares or voting rights (i.e., a qualifying holding – Regulation 575/2013, Art. 4(1)36), it must be reported to the national competent authority of the Member State in which the bank is established. This national authority must then conduct an assessment of the deal and forward its conclusions to the ECB, which is the final decision-maker, validating (with or without conditions) or refusing the transaction (Council Regulation No 1024/2013, Art. 15).

In 2020, the ECB published a document aiming to clarify the way they were assessing such transactions, with the objective of being more transparent and predictable. Even though transactions are assessed on a case-to-case basis, the supervision process of these deals follow the same three stages:

1. The preliminary stage: the ECB advises companies to contact them early in order to get feedback on their transaction project;
2. The formal application stage: the project is officially sent for approval to the ECB;
3. The implementation phase: if approved, the project and its developments are closely monitored by the ECB.

In phase two, the ECB pays particular attention to the sustainability of the suggested business model (e.g., under which assumptions it has been built, what has been planned in terms of IT integration, etc.) and to the governance mechanism at stake (e.g. what the skills and experiences of the leadership are). With this communication, the ECB also took the initiative to clarify how it was computing the capital requirements of the new entity and how it would assess the quality of this new body's assets.

According to two PwC analysts, the publication of this document by the ECB seems to indicate that it wishes to encourage banking consolidation. This position from the ECB is not new. In November 2016, the ECB wrote in its Financial Stability Review the following sentence with regard to the banking sector:

"Consolidation could bring some profitability benefits at the sector level by increasing cost and revenue synergies without worsening the so-called "too-big-to-fail" problem" (ECB Financial Stability Review, Nov. 2016, p. 75)

This positioning of the ECB, in favor of bigger and more competitive banks in Europe, translates a certain bias of this institution towards the financial industry. This bias can be explained by different power mechanisms at stake:

- Instrumental power: central bankers have, through their interactions with expert groups and their past professional experiences, close relationships with professionals from the financial industry, framing their preferences in support of these firms.
- Structural power: banks have today such a large influence on the European economy, employing many people and financing many organizations, that the ECB actually have incentives to protect this industry.
- Infrastructural power: central bankers rely on the banking industry to transmit their policy's objectives to the real economy. When setting its short-term interest rate, the central bank hopes to get an indirect influence, through private banks’ lending operations, on different macroeconomic variables (e.g., inflation).

Because of these mechanisms, it is argued that the interests of central bankers can often be found aligned with the ones of the banking industry. With regard to banking consolidation, the position of the ECB, in support of large competitive banks operating across Europe, tends to favor a situation of financial stability at short-term, at the expense of longer term consequences resulting from an increase in the European systemic risk.

The centralization of banking supervision at the EU level and the harmonization of banking regulations in the EU has already been a way to foster consolidation in the financial industry. Nevertheless, many obstacles to consolidation – economic (e.g., poor economic conditions in Europe), regulatory (e.g., national discrepancies in corporate law) and cultural (e.g., linguistic barriers) – remain. Zooming on obstacles linked to regulatory and monitoring practices, despite efforts of harmonization, the fact that there remain some national inconsistencies in those practices has been identified as a barrier to consolidation (e.g., some countries assess subsidiaries as separate entities, others as part of a single group). Another issue is the tendency of some EU member states, since the EU sovereign debt crisis, to impose minimum capital requirements to their national banks, hindering the free movement of capital across EU's subsidiaries. This reaction could be explained by the current incompleteness of the Banking Union: lacking a third – risk-sharing – pillar, national authorities would not be ready to drop their prerogatives. To sum up, despite a willingness from the sector and authorities to boost the competitiveness of the European banking industry, obstacles remain in the way of a further integration of the European banking market.

== Controversy ==
European Banking Supervision has been, over time, criticised regarding its methodology and scope. This institutional scheme has also suffered from some controversies.

=== Methodological limits ===
Stress tests are an integral part of the supervisory activities of the ECB. Methodological flaws related to these stress tests have been identified and corrected throughout the years in order for these assessments to properly reflect the actual risk status of the banks. In the 2014 stress tests, the capital strength of banks was assessed according to the Basel III approach that uses Common Equity Tier 1 as the only capital buffer. This methodology has been the subject of criticism by many scholars and organisations for its failure to provide good estimates of the actual solvency of banks. This method was deemed to favour investment banks that were less exposed to credit risk as opposed to commercial banks. Today, stress tests remain flawed: e.g., they do not take into account potential externalities and spillovers while these risks have been shown to have significant impacts in a time of crisis. Andrea Enria, the head of the European Banking Authority (EBA), also pointed out the fact that these tests do not take into account possible adjustments that a bank could make in reaction to an economic shock (i.e., stress tests assume that the bank will not react to the shock). Finally, he also emphasised that, while the methodology of stress tests is transparent, decisions taken by the supervisor as a result of these tests (e.g., increase its capital or decrease its dividend payments) are the result of a mutual agreement closed with the bank in a rather non-transparent manner.

In their 2018 report, the European Court of Auditors (ECA) pointed out flaws in the Comprehensive Assessment process of European Banking Supervision. The main identified flaws by the ECA were the limited resources of the ECB to gather the necessary information to assess the assets' quality of banks and a lack of effective guidance on risk assessment.

=== Institutional limits ===
A first limit to the scope of application of European Banking Supervision is geographical: it does not cover all EU member states. This system hence contributes to what is known as the multi-speed Europe. Another limitation to the scope of application of European Banking Supervision is the fact that it only deals with the supervision of banks. Supervision of the rest of the financial sector (e.g., insurance firms) remains a national competence. The supervisory role of the ECB is restricted to individual banking institutions as they are defined in the Capital Requirements Directive IV. This means that the ECB cannot conduct supervision on over-the-counter derivatives markets, wholesale debt securities markets and on the shadow banking industry. In addition, some aspects of bank supervision (e.g., consumer protection or money laundering monitoring) continue to be dealt with at the national level. Furthermore, while the ECB directly supervises the most significant banks of the Eurozone, the supervision of smaller banks remains under national realm. National authorities are also in charge of defining their own macro prudential policy, limiting the ability of the ECB to take a proactive stance on systemic and liquidity risks. Finally, when European Banking Supervision was first launched, some economists were sceptical with regard to the composition of its Supervisory Board: they criticized the fact that a large majority of this board would be composed of national supervisors who "do not appreciate ECB interference in their daily national supervisory activities".

The quality of the ECB's banking supervision is dependent on the effectiveness of the Single Resolution Mechanism as well as on the creation of a deposit insurance scheme. In 2018, 17 economists published a paper calling for a reform of the banking union. These economists emphasised the necessity to consolidate the Single Resolution Mechanism, enabling the establishment of real risk-sharing mechanisms. With regard to the deposit insurance scheme, it has been subject to a first proposal by the Commission in November 2015 but no tangible progress has been made since then to achieve its implementation.

Thirdly, as laid down in articles 130 and 282 of the TFEU, the independence of the ECB from political actors should be guaranteed. However, the ECB has to rely on the European Parliament and the Council to take decisions regarding the reporting of its supervisory activities and the appointment of its members. The perceived need of democratic legitimacy that is at the basis of these procedures can be thought to create a shift of accountability from the ECB to the institutions – or member states – of the Union.

A final important question arises when prudential supervision and monetary policy are at stake, as it is the case at the ECB: as these two areas are intertwined, how to avoid potential conflicts of interest? The Supervisory Board is theoretically in charge of preventing these issues from happening. In practice, the ECB has already interfered with the solvency assessments of its supervised banks by, for example, purchasing asset-backed securities issued by these same banks.

=== Supervisory forbearance ===
In 2017, Banca Monte dei Paschi di Siena, an Italian bank, was subject to a national insolvency procedure following multiple unsuccessful recapitalisations. Later that year however, the ECB declared the bank to be solvent on the basis of the stress tests performed by the EBA in 2016, which was a requirement for the bank to benefit from a precautionary recapitalisation by the Italian government. Many member states such as Germany criticised the ECB's methodology and considered it as vague and non-transparent.

In 2019, the European Commission concluded a contract with the American asset management company BlackRock. The company has been mandated to advise the Commission on prudential risk matters to implement sustainability in the banking regulation ecosystem. This is not the first time that the ECB has been working with BlackRock: in the aftermath of the Eurozone debt crisis, in 2014, the private firm already helped the ECB conduct its comprehensive assessment of the European banking market. Concerns over potential conflicts of interests have been raised regarding the choice of a private company because of the potential influence on the rulemaking of the ECB, as well as on the credibility of BlackRock to perform such a task. The Commission and BlackRock rejected any wrongdoings and respectively invoked independence and transparency.

=== COVID-19 pandemic ===
The COVID-19 crisis has highlighted new limitations concerning the methodology of stress tests. During the first half of 2020, financial markets underwent unprecedented fluctuations far from what had been considered in the most severe forecasts (e.g., in the most adverse scenarios of the EBA, oil would lose 15% of its value whereas oil price actually fell by 60% at the peak of the crisis in 2020). This COVID-19 crisis could actually be considered as a real-life stress test whose macroeconomic factors could later be used to readjust the EBA-ECB most severe scenario in their subsequent evaluations. This health crisis has also illustrated the dual role of the ECB: its actions during the crisis reflected a mix between its mandate as banking supervisor and its initiatives in support of the stability of financial markets.

== See also ==
- AnaCredit
- European banking union
- Single Resolution Mechanism
- List of acronyms associated with the Eurozone crisis
- List of financial supervisory authorities by country
