= Japanese Culture House of Paris =

Cultural institution in Paris, France

- Maison de la culture du Japon à Paris
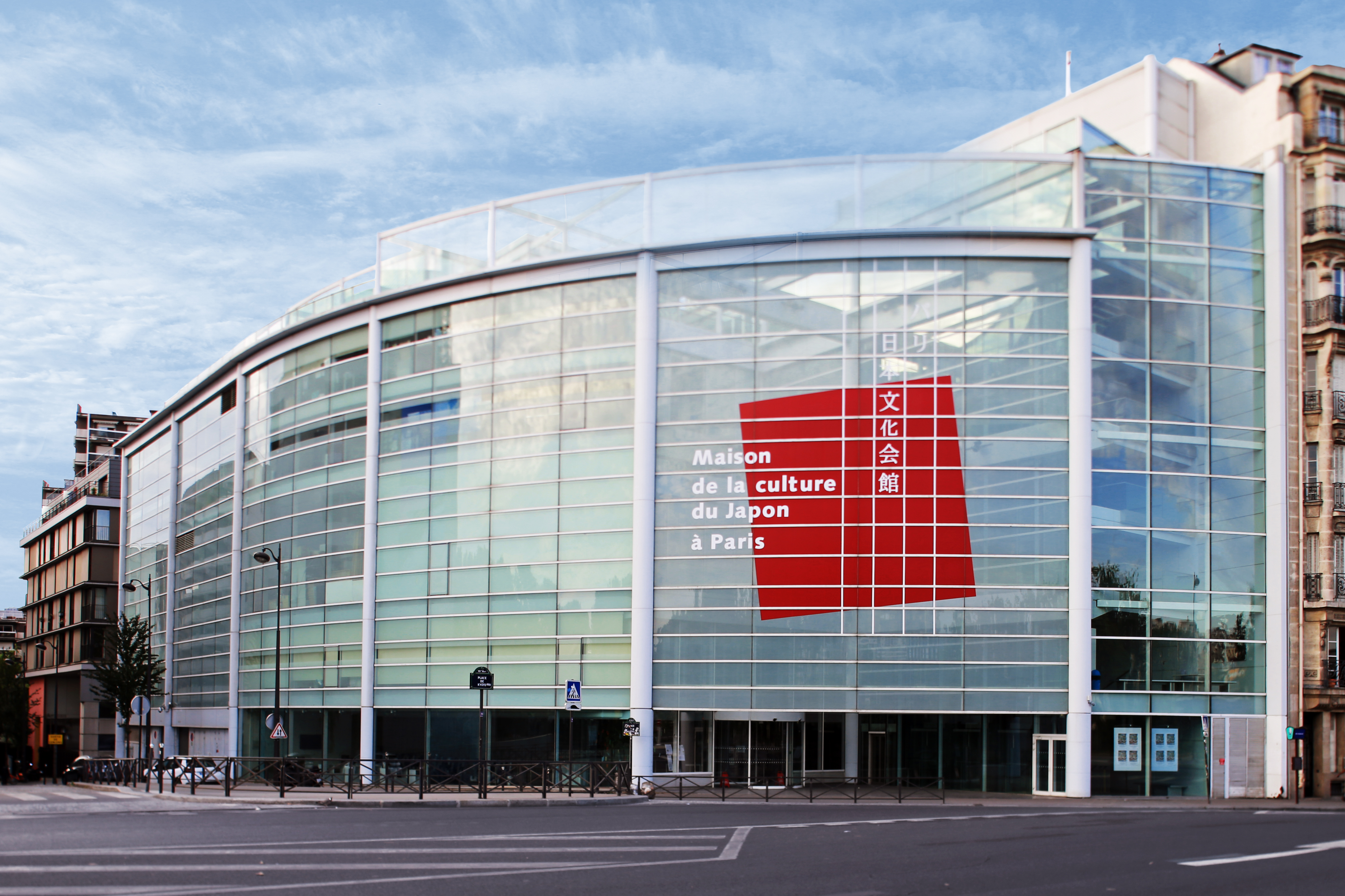
- Types: Cultural institution Cultural center Concert hall
- Country: France
- Coordinates: 48°51′17″N 2°17′23″E
- Website: www.mcjp.fr/fr

The Japanese Culture House of Paris (French: La maison de la culture du Japon à Paris) (Japanese: パリ日本文化会館) (also known as MCJP) is located at 101 bis, quai Jacques-Chirac, in the 15th arrondissement of Paris. Its purpose is to introduce Japanese culture to the French. It is managed by the Japan Foundation in France.

== Building ==
The project for such an establishment was launched during a meeting in Japan between the President of the French Republic François Mitterrand and the Japanese Prime Minister Zenkō Suzuki. The building is the work of two architects, the British architect, Kenneth Armstrong and the Japanese architect, Masayuki Yamanaka. Started in 1994, the construction completed at the end of 1997. The MCJP was inaugurated on May 13, 1997, by the President of the French Republic at the time, Jacques Chirac, and by Princess Sayako.

== Description ==
The building, built on a pre-existed building, from the Haussmann's renovation era of Paris, with a large mural dedicated to the Great Men of the 20th century painted on it.

It has eleven floors, six of which are visible. It includes, among other things, an exhibition hall, two multi-purpose rooms of 500 m2 and 130 m2, a library and a traditional tea pavilion. The house presents exhibitions, shows, film screenings, conferences, and workshops and classes on Japanese culture: ikebana, calligraphy, go, manga, origami and Japanese tea ceremony.

== Divers ==
A conference on the indigenous Ainu minority in Japan was given on October 3, 2016, at the MCJP; on this occasion the team of the library of the Culture House prepared a profile on this people showing the first documentation of Ainu language is the Ainu-English compiled by the English missionary John Batchelor.

On April 14, 2021, the Council of Paris voted to rename most of the Quai Branly Museum to “Quai Jacques-Chirac”, in homage to the former President of the French Republic, in particular for the close ties he had forged with Japan.

== See also ==
- Quartier de Grenelle
