= Stability and Growth Pact =

Main European Union fiscal agreement

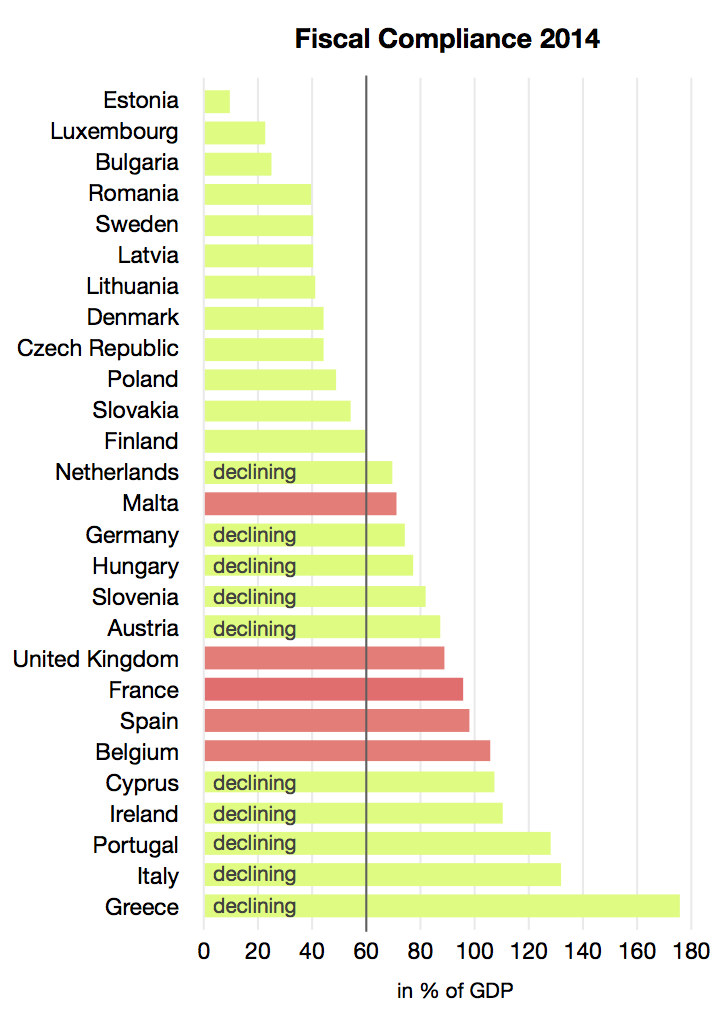
Forecast fiscal compliance of EU member states (debt-to-GDP criterion)

The Stability and Growth Pact (SGP) is an agreement, among all the 27 member states of the European Union (EU), to facilitate and maintain the stability of the Economic and Monetary Union (EMU). Based primarily on Articles 121 and 126 of the Treaty on the Functioning of the European Union, it consists of fiscal monitoring of member states by the European Commission and the Council of the European Union, and the issuing of a yearly Country-Specific Recommendation for fiscal policy actions to ensure a full compliance with the SGP also in the medium-term. If a member state breaches the SGP's outlined maximum limit for government deficit and debt, the surveillance and request for corrective action will intensify through the declaration of an Excessive Deficit Procedure (EDP); and if these corrective actions continue to remain absent after multiple warnings, a member state of the eurozone can ultimately also be issued economic sanctions. The pact was outlined by a European Council resolution in June 1997, and two Council regulations in July 1997. The first regulation "on the strengthening of the surveillance of budgetary positions and the surveillance and coordination of economic policies", known as the "preventive arm", entered into force 1 July 1998. The second regulation "on speeding up and clarifying the implementation of the excessive deficit procedure", sometimes referred to as the "dissuasive arm" but commonly known as the "corrective arm", entered into force 1 January 1999.

The purpose of the pact was to ensure that fiscal discipline would be maintained and enforced in the EMU. All EU member states are automatically members of both the EMU and the SGP, as this is defined by paragraphs in the EU Treaty itself. The fiscal discipline is ensured by the SGP by requiring each Member State, to implement a fiscal policy aiming for the country to stay within the limits on government deficit (3% of GDP) and debt (60% of GDP); and in case of having a debt level above 60% it should each year decrease with a satisfactory pace towards a level below. As outlined by the "preventive arm" regulation, all EU member states are each year obliged to submit a SGP compliance report for the scrutiny and evaluation of the European Commission and the Council of the European Union, that will present the country's expected fiscal development for the current and subsequent three years. These reports are called "stability programmes" for eurozone Member States and "convergence programmes" for non-eurozone Member States, but despite having different titles they are identical in regards of the content. After the reform of the SGP in 2005, these programmes have also included the Medium-Term budgetary Objectives (MTO), being individually calculated for each Member State as the medium-term sustainable average-limit for the country's structural deficit, and the Member State is also obliged to outline the measures it intends to implement to attain its MTO. If the EU Member State does not comply with both the deficit limit and the debt limit, a so-called "Excessive Deficit Procedure" (EDP) is initiated along with a deadline to comply, which basically includes and outlines an "adjustment path towards reaching the MTO". This procedure is outlined by the "dissuasive arm" regulation.

The SGP was initially proposed by German finance minister Theo Waigel in the mid-1990s. Germany had long maintained a low-inflation policy, which had been an important part of the German economy's robust performance since the 1950s. The German government hoped to ensure the continuation of that policy through the SGP, which would ensure the prevalence of fiscal responsibility, and limit the ability of governments to exert inflationary pressures on the European economy. As such, it was also described to be a key tool for the member states adopting the euro, to ensure that they did not only meet the Maastricht convergence criteria at the time of adopting the euro but kept on complying with the fiscal criteria for the following years. The Excessive Deficit Procedure (EDP), also known as the corrective arm of the SGP, was suspended via activation of the "general escape clause" during 2020–2023 to allow for higher deficit spending; first due to the COVID-19 pandemic arriving as an extraordinary circumstance, and later during 2022–2023 due to the Russian invasion of Ukraine having sent energy prices up, defence spending up and budgetary pressures up across the EU. Despite the EDP suspension in 2020–2023, Romania still experienced the opening of an EDP in April 2020; but only because of existence of a deficit limit breach being recorded already for its 2019 fiscal year, which required corrective action across 2020–2024, to remedy a budgetary imbalance created before 2020. 16 out of 27 member states had a technical SGP criteria breach, when their 2022 fiscal results and 2023 budgets were analyzed in May 2023; because those breaches were exempted due to the finding of temporary and exceptional circumstances, reflected by the activation of the general escape clause, no new EDPs were opened against those member states.

The EDP will be assessed again starting from 19 June 2024, where each country will have their usual set of a "2024 National Reform Programme" and "2024 Stability or Convergence Programme" analyzed, with a compliance check of the 2023 fiscal result and 2024 budget with the existing 2019-version of the SGP rules, although only 3% deficit breaches will be evaluated because no debt limit or debt reduction breach can trigger an EDP in 2024. The European Commission reasoned for its continued deactivation for another year of the debt limit or debt reduction rule in 2023–2024, stating "that compliance with the debt reduction benchmark could imply a too demanding frontloaded fiscal effort that would risk to jeopardise economic growth. Therefore, in the view of the Commission, compliance with the debt reduction benchmark is not warranted under the prevailing economic conditions." In February 2024, the EU approved a revised set of SGP rules, that will introduce acceptance of a slower adjustment path towards respecting the deficit and debt limit of the SGP, and extend the maximum duration of an Excessive Deficit Procedure from four to seven years if certain reform requirements are respected. The new revised rules will be finally adopted by the European Parliament and Council of Ministers before the 2024 European Parliament election; and fully applied starting from the presented drafts for 2025 budgets. The first "national medium-term fiscal-structural plans" guided by the new revised fiscal rules, will cover the four-year period 2025–2028, and need to be submitted by each member state by 20 September 2024.

== Timeline ==
This is a timeline of how the Stability and Growth Pact evolved over time:

- 1997: The Stability and Growth Pact is decided.
- 1998: The preventative arm comes into force.
- 1999: The corrective arm comes into force.
- 2005: The SGP is amended.
- 2011: The Six Pack enters into force.
- 2013: The Fiscal Compact and the Two-Pack are adopted.
- 2020: The General Escape Clause within the existing regulations is activated, and the SGP fiscal rules suspended for fiscal years 2020–22.
- 2023: The General Escape Clause within the existing regulations is deactivated, and the SGP fiscal rules will apply again starting from the next evaluation in June 2024, concerning data for fiscal year 2023 and budget year 2024.
- 2024: Reform of the Economic Governance Framework (new fiscal rules) will be adopted by EU in spring 2024, and apply starting from submission of 2025 budgets and 2025–2028 national fiscal plans in September 2024.

== Reform 2005 ==
In March 2005, the EU Council, under the pressure of France and Germany, relaxed the rules; the EC said it was to respond to criticisms of insufficient flexibility and to make the pact more enforceable. The Ecofin agreed on a reform of the SGP. The ceilings of 3% for budget deficit and 60% for public debt were maintained, but the decision to declare a country in excessive deficit can now rely on certain parameters: the behaviour of the cyclically adjusted budget, the level of debt, the duration of the slow growth period and the possibility that the deficit is related to productivity-enhancing procedures. The pact is part of a set of Council Regulations, decided upon the European Council Summit 22–23 March 2005.

Reform changes of the preventive arm

- Country-specific Medium-Term budgetary Objectives (MTO): Previously throughout 1999–2004 the SGP had outlined a common MTO for all Member States, which was "to achieve a budgetary position of close to balance or in surplus over a complete business cycle". After the reform, MTOs were calculated to country-specific values according to "the economic and budgetary position and sustainability risks of the Member State", based upon the state's current debt-to-GDP ratio and long-term potential GDP growth, while the overall objective over the medium term is still "to achieve a budgetary position of close to balance or in surplus over a complete business cycle". No exact formula for the calculation of the country specific MTO was presented in 2005, but it was emphasized the upper limit for the MTO should be at a level "providing a safety margin towards continuously respecting the government's 3% deficit limit, while ensuring fiscal sustainability in the long run". In addition it was enforced by the EU regulation, that the upper MTO limit for eurozone states or ERM II Member States should be: Max. 1.0% of GDP in structural deficit if the state had a combination of low debt and high potential growth, and if the opposite was the case – or if the state suffered from increased age-related sustainability risks in the long term, then the upper MTO limit should move up to be in "balance or in surplus". Finally, it was emphasized, that each Member State has the task to select its MTO when submitting its yearly convergence/stability programme report, and always allowed to select its MTO at a more ambitious level compared to the upper MTO limit, if this better suited its medium-term fiscal policy.
- Minimum annual budgetary effort – for states on the adjustment path to reach its MTO: All Member States agreed that fiscal consolidation of the budget should be pursued "when the economic conditions are favourable", which was defined as being periods where the actual GDP growth exceeded the average for long-term potential growth. In regards of windfall revenues, a rule was also agreed, that such funds should be spent directly on reduction of government deficit and debt. In addition, a special adjustment rule was agreed for all Eurozone states and ERM-II member states being found not yet to have reached their MTO, outlining that they commit to implement yearly improvements for its structural deficit equal to minimum 0.5% of GDP.
- Early-warning system: The existing early-warning mechanism is expanded. The European Commission can now also issue an "opinion" directed to member states, without a prior Council involvement, in situations where the opinion functions as formal advice and encouragement to a Member State for realizing the agreed adjustment path towards reaching its declared MTO. This means that the commission will not limit its opinion/recommendations only to situations with an acute risk of breaching the 3% of GDP reference value, but also contact Member States with a notification letter in cases where it finds unjustified deviations from the adjustment path towards the declared MTO or unexpected breaches of the MTO itself (even if the 3% deficit limit is fully respected).
- Structural reforms: To ensure that implementation of needed structural reforms will not face disincentives due to the regime of complying with the adjustment path towards reaching a declared MTO, it was agreed that implementation of major structural reforms (if they have direct long-term cost-saving effects – and can be verified to improve fiscal sustainability over the long term – i.e. pension scheme reforms), should automatically allow for a temporary deviation from the MTO or its adjustment path, equal to the costs of implementing the structural reform, in the condition that the 3% deficit limit will be respected and the MTO or MTO-adjustment path will be reached again within the four-year programme period.

Reform changes of the correcting arm

- Definition of excessive deficits:
- Deadlines and repetition of steps in the excessive deficit procedure:
- Taking into account systemic pension reforms:
- Focus on debt and fiscal sustainability:

Reform changes of the economic governance

- Fiscal governance:
- Statistical governance:

== Reforms 2011–13 ==
The euro area crisis proved the serious shortcomings embedded in the SGP. On one hand, fiscal wisdom was not spontaneously followed by the majority of Eurozone Members during the early-2000s expansion cycle. On the other hand, the EDP was not duly carried out, when necessary, as the cases of France and Germany clearly show.

In order to stabilise the Eurozone, Member States adopted an extensive package of reforms, aiming at straightening both the substantive budgetary rules and the enforcement framework. The result was a complete revision of the SGP. The measures adopted soon proved highly controversial, because they implied an unprecedented curtailment of national sovereignty and the conferral upon the Union of penetrating surveillance competences. The new framework consists of a patchwork of normative acts, both within and outside the formal EU edifice. Consequently, the system is now much more complex.

=== Treaty on Stability, Coordination and Governance ===
The Treaty on Stability, Coordination and Governance (TSCG), commonly labeled as European Fiscal Compact, was signed on 2 March 2012 by all eurozone member states and eight other EU member states and entered into force on 1 January 2013. As of today, all current 27 EU member states ratified or acceded to the treaty, while the main opponent against the TSCG (the United Kingdom) left the EU in January 2020. The TSCG was intended to promote the launch of a new intergovernmental economic cooperation, outside the formal framework of the EU treaties, because most (but not all) member states at the time of its creation were willing to be bound by extra commitments.

Despite being an intergovernmental treaty outside the EU legal framework, all treaty provisions function as an extension to pre-existing EU regulations, utilising the same reporting instruments and organisational structures already created within the EU in the three areas: Budget discipline enforced by Stability and Growth Pact (extended by Title III), Coordination of economic policies (extended by Title IV), and Governance within the EMU (extended by Title V). The full treaty applies for all eurozone member states. A voluntary opt-in for non-eurozone member states to be bound by the fiscal and economic provisions of the treaty (Title III+IV) has been declared by Denmark, Bulgaria and Romania, while this main part of the treaty currently does not apply for Sweden, Poland, Hungary and Czech Republic – until the point of time they either declare otherways or adopt the euro.

Member states bound by Title III of the TSCG have to transpose these fiscal provisions (referred to as the Fiscal Compact) into their national legislation. In particular, the general government budget has to be in balance or surplus, under the treaty's definition. As a novelty, an automatic correction mechanism has to be established by written law in order to correct potential significant deviations. Establishment is also required of a national independent monitoring institution to provide fiscal surveillance (commonly referred to as a fiscal council), with a mandate to verify all statistical data and fiscal budgets of the government are in compliance with the agreed fiscal rules, and ensure the proper functioning of the automatic correction mechanism.

The treaty defines a balanced budget exactly the same way the SGP did, as a government budget deficit not exceeding 3.0% of the gross domestic product (GDP), and a structural deficit not exceeding a country-specific Medium-Term budgetary Objective (MTO). The Fiscal Compact however introduced a more strict upper MTO-limit compared to SGP, as it now at most can be set to 0.5% of GDP for states with a debt‑to‑GDP ratio exceeding 60%, while only states with debt levels below 60% of GDP will be subject to respect an upper MTO-limit at the SGP-allowed 1.0% of GDP. The exact applying country-specific minimum MTO is recalculated and set by the European Commission for each country every third year, and might be set at levels stricter than the greatest latitude permitted by the treaty.

In line with the existing SGP rules, the general government budget balance of a member state will be in compliance with the TSCG deficit criteria, either if its found to be within the country-specific MTO-limit, or if its found to display "rapid progress" on its "adjustment path" towards respecting the country-specific MTO-limit. On this point the TSCG is only stricter than SGP by using the phrase "rapid progress" (without quantifying this term), while the SGP regulation opted instead to use the phrase "sufficient progress". In line with the existing SGP rules, the European Commission will for each country set the available time-frame for the "adjustment path" until the MTO-limit shall be achieved, based on consideration of a country-specific debt sustainability risk assessment, while also respecting the requirement that the annual improvements for the structural budget balance shall be minimum 0.5% of GDP.

The treaty refers to that the compliance check and calculation of sufficiently required corrections for the debt-limit and "debt brake" criteria, shall be identical with the existing operating debt rules outlined by the Stability and Growth Pact. The outlined debt-limit and debt brake criteria established four ways for a member state to comply with the debt rules, either by simply having a gross debt level below 60% of GDP, or if above 60% of GDP it then needs to be found "sufficiently diminishing" by specific calculation formulas, either over a "3‑year forward looking period" or a "3‑year backward looking period" or a "3‑year backward looking period based on cyclical adjusted data".

If any of the periodic checks conducted by the national fiscal council finds the budget or estimated fiscal account of the general government to be noncompliant with the deficit or debt criteria of the treaty, the state is obliged to immediately rectify the issue by implementing sufficient counteracting fiscal measures or changes to its ongoing fiscal policy for the specific year(s) in concern. If a state is in breach at the time of the treaty's entry into force, the correction will be deemed to be sufficient if it delivers sufficiently large annual improvements to remain on a country specific predefined "adjustment path" towards the limits at a midterm horizon. Similar to the general escape clause of the SGP, a state suffering a significant recession or a temporary exceptional event outside its control with major budgetary impact, will be exempted from the requirement to deliver a fiscal automatic correction for as long as it lasts.

The treaty states that the signatories shall attempt to incorporate the treaty into EU's legal framework, on the basis of an assessment of the experience with its implementation, by 1 January 2018 at the latest. In December 2017, the European Commission proposed a new Council Directive to incorporate the main fiscal provisions of the TSCG (all articles of its Title III – except article 7) into EU law. The ECB proposed several clarifying amendments to this proposed Council Directive in May 2018, while noting a potential adoption of this Directive should only happen together with an amendment of the pre-existing Council Regulation 1466/97, in order to reflect the TSCG had introduced a stricter upper limit for the structural deficit (MTO) at 0.5% of GDP for member states indebted by a debt-to-GDP ratio above 60%, which was a stricter limit than the maximum 1% of GDP being allowed by Council Regulation 1466/97 for all eurozone member states regardless of their debt-to-GDP ratio. If the Council Directive is adopted, it will align the EU fiscal rules with the TSCG fiscal rules. As the content of the Directive does not cover all articles of the TSCG, it will however not replace it, but continue to coexist with TSCG. The proposed Council Directive was never adopted, but the latest 2024 reform is a new attempt to integrate the TSCG into EU law, that will likely succeed.

=== Secondary legislation ===
Several secondary legislative acts were implemented to strengthen both the preventive and the corrective arms of the SGP. One must distinguish between the 2011 Sixpack and the 2013 Twopack.

==== Sixpack ====
The Sixpack consists of five Regulations and one Directive, which all entered into force on 13 December 2011, although compliance with the Directive was only required by 31 December 2013.

- Regulation 1177/2011 amended the corrective arm (Regulation 1467/97), with a new debt reduction rule being introduced and operationalised (see subchapter below), and the Excessive Deficit Procedure being modified. On one side, each procedural step was subjected to precise and bounding timing. On the other side, the flexibility clauses listed in Art. 126(3) were better specified to reduce enforcement uncertainty.
- Regulation 1176/2011 introduced the Macroeconomic Imbalance Procedure (MIP), a new procedure based on the macroeconomic clauses of the treaties. This procedure is not concerned with budgetary rules, but with the reduction of "macroeconomic imbalances". The latter consists of economic trends experienced by one member state that can upset the normal functioning of the economy. An example of such trends might be the development of a housing bubble like the one that busted in Ireland in 2010, or of an uncontrolled current account surplus or deficit.
- Regulations 1173/2011 and 1174/2011 modified the framework for the imposition of sanctions in the context of both the EDP and the MIP. A semi-automatic mechanism was introduced: the establishment of a budgetary infringement would trigger a fining decision within the Council unless a qualified majority vote expresses a contrary opinion. Furthermore, as the infringements persist, less afflictive sanctions (such as interest-bearing deposits) are automatically transformed into more afflictive ones (either non-interest-bearing deposits or fines).
- Regulation 1175/2011 amended the preventive arm (Regulation 1466/97), and introduced the European Semester. This is a procedure meant to provide a forum for ex ante coordination of economic and budgetary policies of Member States on an annual basis. In particular, every year in April all eurozone member states submit their "stability programmes", while all non-eurozone member states submit "convergence programmes" that except of a different title provides identical content. These documents outline the main elements of the member states' budgetary plans and are assessed by the commission for compliance with the SGP criteria both within the preventive arm (MTO achievement) and corrective arm (EDP correction). An important part of the assessment addresses compliance with the minimum annual benchmark figures set for each individual country's structural budget balance, striving towards either a minimum improvement for the structural budget balance to be on the set path to correct an ongoing Excessive Deficit Procedure within the corrective arm, or striving towards achievement of the country-specific Medium-Term budgetary Objective (MTO) – or being assessed to be on an appropriate adjustment path towards this MTO within the preventive arm. Based on its assessment of the stability and convergence programmes, the commission also draws up Country-Specific Recommendations for all EU member states, on which the Council adopts opinions in July. These include recommendations for appropriate economic and fiscal policy actions. All CSRs adopted in the context of the European Semester since 2011 are registered in the CSR database, which is the main tool for recording and monitoring each member state's annual progress with the implementation of CSRs. Furthermore, the Council adopts recommendations on economic policies that apply to the euro area as a whole.
- Directive 2011/85/EU outlined requirements for annually submitted budgetary frameworks of all member states, and shall be implemented by each member state no later than 31 December 2013.

===== New debt reduction rule (Regulation 1177/2011) =====
The corrective arm of the SGP (Regulation 1467/97) was amended by Regulation 1177/2011. By an entirely rewritten "article 2", this amendment introduced and operationalised a new "debt reduction rule", commonly referred to as the "debt brake rule", and legislatively referred to as the "1/20 numerical benchmark for debt reduction". The new debt reduction rule entered into force at the EU level on 13 December 2011.

- Debt brake rule: Member states whose gross debt-to-GDP ratio for the general government exceeds the 60% reference level in the latest recorded fiscal year, shall reduce it at an average rate of at least one twentieth (5%) per year of the exceeded percentage points, where the calculated average period shall be either the 3‑year period covering the latest fiscal year and forecasts for the current and next year, or the latest three fiscal years. Rising debt levels for both of the rolling 3‑year periods, are allowed for as long as the debt-to-GDP ratio of the member state does not exceed 60% in the latest recorded fiscal year. If the European Commission had decided the interim values in the 3‑year periods should have no direct influence on the reduction requirement at the end point of the period, then the formula would have been quite simple (i.e. for a debt-to-GDP ratio recorded to be 80% by the end of the year preceding the latest fiscal year, then it should for the period covering the latest fiscal year and the subsequent forecast two years decline with at least: 1/20 * (80%‑60%) = 1.0 percentage point per year, resulting in a limit of 77.0% three years later). As the European Commission decided interim values in the 3‑year periods also should impact the final debt reduction requirement, they came up with this slightly more complicated benchmark calculation formula:

- Backwards-checking formula for the debt reduction bechmark (bb_{t}):
  bb_{t} = 60% + 0.95*(b_{t-1}-60%)/3 + 0.95^{2}*(b_{t-2}-60%)/3 + 0.95^{3}*(b_{t-3}-60%)/3.
  The bb-value is the calculated benchmark limit for year t.
  The formula feature three t-year-indexes for backwards-checking.
- Forwards-checking formula for the debt reduction bechmark (bb_{t+2}):
  bb_{t+2} = 60% + 0.95*(b_{t+1}-60%)/3 + 0.95^{2}*(b_{t}-60%)/3 + 0.95^{3}*(b_{t-1}-60%)/3.
  When checking forwards, the same formula is applied as the backwards-checking formula, just with all the t-year-indexes being pushed two years forward.
- The year referred to as t in the backward-looking and forward-looking formula listed above, is always the latest completed fiscal year with available outturn data. For example, a backward-check conducted in 2024 will always check whether outturn data from the completed 2023 fiscal year (t) featured a debt-to-GDP ratio (b_{t}) at a level respecting the "2023 debt reduction benchmark" (bb_{t}) calculated on basis of outturn data for the debt-to-GDP ratio from 2020+2021+2022, while the forward-looking check conducted in 2024 will be all about whether the forecast 2025-data (b_{t+2}) will respect the "2025 debt reduction benchmark" (bb_{t+2}) calculated on basis of debt-to-GDP ratio data for 2022+2023+2024. It shall be noted, that whenever a b input-value (debt-to-GDP ratio) is recorded/forecast below 60%, its data-input shall be replaced by a fictive 60% value in the formula.
- Besides of the backward-looking debt-brake compliance check (b_{t} $\scriptscriptstyle\leq$ bb_{t}) and forward-looking debt-brake compliance check (b_{t+2} $\scriptscriptstyle\leq$ bb_{t+2}), a third cyclically adjusted backward-looking debt-brake check (b*_{t} $\scriptscriptstyle\leq$ bb_{t}) also form part of the assessment whether or not a member state is in abeyance with the debt-criterion. This check applies the same backwards-checking formula for the debt reduction bechmark (bb_{t}), but now checks if the cyclically adjusted debt-to-GDP ratio (b*_{t}) respects this calculated benchmark-limit (bb_{t}) by being compliant with the equation: b*_{t} $\scriptscriptstyle\leq$ bb_{t}. The exact formula used to calculate the cyclically adjusted debt-to-GDP ratio for the latest completed year t with outturn data (b*_{t}), is displayed by the formula box below.

Formula used to calculate the cyclically adjusted debt-to-GDP ratio for the latest year "t" with recorded data (b*_{t})
- B_{t} + C_{t} + C_{t-1} + C_{t-2}
- ^{b*_{t} =}: Y_{t-3} * (1 + Ypot_{t})(1 + P_{t}) * (1 + Ypot_{t-1})(1 + P_{t-1}) * (1 + Ypot_{t-2})(1 + P_{t-2})
- B_{t} stands for consolidated nominal gross debt of the general government in year t.; C_{t} stands for the consolidated nominal gross debt generated by the cyclical component of the general government budget balance in year t (note: As the linked AMECO data series for C_{t} only display this figure as a percentage of 2010 potential GDP at current prices, it shall of course be recalculated back to its nominal figure by multiplying it with the 2010 potential GDP).; Y_{t} stands for nominal GDP at current market prices in year t.; Ypot_{t} stands for potential growth rate in year t (table 13 in source).; P_{t} stands for the GDP price deflator rate in year t (table 15 in source).

If just one of the four quantitative debt-requirements (including the first one requesting the debt-to-GDP ratio to be below 60% in the latest recorded fiscal year) is complied with: b_{t} $\scriptscriptstyle\leq$ 60% or b_{t} $\scriptscriptstyle\leq$ bb_{t} or b*_{t} $\scriptscriptstyle\leq$ bb_{t} or b_{t+2} $\scriptscriptstyle\leq$ bb_{t+2}, then a member state will be declared to be in abeyance with the debt brake rule. Otherwise the commission will declare existence of an "apparent breach" of the debt-criterion by the publication of a 126(3) report, which shall investigate if the "apparent breach" was "real" after having taken a range of allowed exemptions into consideration. Provided no special "breach exemptions" can be found to exist by the 126(3) report (i.e. finding the debt breach was solely caused by "structural improving pension reforms" or "payment of bailout funds to financial stability mechanisms" or "payment of national funds to the new European Fund for Strategic Investments" or "appearance of an EU-wide recession"), then the commission will recommend the council to open a debt-breached EDP against the member state by the publication of a 126(6) report.

For transitional reasons, the regulation granted all 23 EU member states with an ongoing EDP in November 2011, a 3‑year exemption period to comply with the rule, which shall start in the year when the member state have its 2011-EDP abrogated. For example, Ireland will only be obliged to comply with the new debt brake rule in 2019, if they, as expected, manage to correct their EDP in fiscal year 2015 – with the formal EDP abrogation then taking place in 2016. During the years where the 23 member states are exempted from complying with the new debt brake rule, they are still obliged to comply with the old debt brake rule that requires the debt-to-GDP ratios in excess of 60% to be "sufficiently diminished", meaning that it must approach the 60% reference value at a "satisfactory pace" ensuring it will succeed to meet the debt reduction requirement of the new debt brake rule three years after its EDP is abrogated. This special transitional "satisfactory pace" is calculated by the Commission individually for each of the concerned member states, and is published to them in form of a figure for: The annually required Minimum Linear Structural Adjustment (MLSA) of the deficit in each of the 3 years in the transition period – ensuring the compliance with the new debt brake rule by the end of the transition period.

==== Twopack ====
The Twopack consists of two Regulations that entered into force on 30 May 2013. They are exclusively applicable to eurozone member states and introduced additional coordination and surveillance of their budgetary processes. They were deemed necessary given the higher potential for spillover effects of budgetary policies in a common currency area. The additional regulations complement the SGP's requirement for surveillance, by enhancing the frequency and scope of scrutiny of the member state's policymaking, but do not place additional requirements on the policy itself. The degree of surveillance will depend on the economic health of the member state.

Regulation 473/2013 is directed at all eurozone member states and requires a draft budgetary plan for the upcoming year to be submitted annually by 15 October, for a SGP compliance assessment conducted by the European Commission. The member state shall then await receiving the commission's opinion before the draft budgetary plan is debated and voted for in their national parliament. The commission will not be granted any veto right over the national parliaments potential pass of a fiscal budget, but will have the role to issue warnings in advance to the national parliaments, if the proposed draft budget is found to compromise the debt and deficit rules of the SGP.

- The regulation requires that any eurozone member state subject to an open EDP shall also publish a "status report for corrective action" by 6 months intervals, with the frequency increased to quarterly reports if the state "persistently fails to implement the Council recommendations for corrective measures in order to remedy the excessive deficit".

Regulation 472/2013 is concerned with the subgroup of eurozone member states experiencing or being threatened by financial instability, which is understood to be the case if the state has an ongoing Excessive Imbalance Procedure (EIP) or receives any macroeconomic financial assistance from EFSM/EFSF/ESM/IMF/other bilateral basis. These member states are made subject to even more in depth and frequent "enhanced surveillance", in order to prevent a possible sovereign debt crisis.

- The regulation requires that "status reports for corrective action" needs to be published on a quarterly basis, and that the commission on that basis will be allowed to send warnings to the national parliament of the member state concerned, about a likely missed compliance with programme targets and/or the fiscal adjustment path to comply with EDP deadlines; at such an early stage in the process, that the affected member state still have sufficient time to implement needed counter-measures to prevent the possible delay of the required compliance.

==== Assessment and criticism ====
In the post-crisis period, the legal debate on EMU largely focused on assessing the effects of both the Six- and the Two-Pack on the SGP. Most scholars admit that a considerable improvement occurred in the field of budgetary enforcement, especially for what concerns the imposition of dissuasive sanctions upon noncompliant Members. However, critical positions generally outnumber positive ones.

Many have criticised the growing complexity of the enforcement procedures. The reform process had to reconcile a strong tightening of the EDP with the pressure for wider escape clauses. The tension between these opposite trends fostered the developments of complicated assessment criteria, often translated in sophisticated mathematical formulas. This not only induces confusion in the overall framework, but also makes the procedural outcome hardly predictable for Member States.

Another widespread criticism concerns the high democratic deficit embedded by the SGP. National policymakers are elected democratically backed up at national level, whereas the EU (in its quality of central watchdog) is only in an indirect way. The friction between the two levels is ever more perceived in periods of economic distress, when the quest for budgetary consolidation becomes more compelling. Scholars agree in referring the issue of democratic deficit to the lack of a more federalised institutional framework for the Eurozone economic governance. The argument goes that strongly legitimated Union institutions would avoid the need for penetrating surveillance mechanisms, as they would partially shift economic policymaking at central level.

=== Bailout programs ===
Because of the crisis, some Members lost access to financial markets to refinance their debt. Clearly, the SGP framework proved not enough to ensure the stability of the Eurozone. For this reason, a bailout facility was deemed necessary to face such extraordinary challenges. The first attempt was the European Financial Stability Facility (EFSF), specifically created in 2010 to help Greece, Portugal, and Ireland. However, a permanent facility was created two years later with the establishment of the European Stability Mechanism (ESM). The latter consists of an international treaty signed on 2 February 2012 by Eurozone Members only.

Ailing Members receive financial aid in the form of low-interest loans whose disbursement is attached policy conditionalities. The latter usually consist in Macroeconomic Adjustment Programs (MAPs) whose adoption is deemed necessary to fix the imbalances which gave rise to the original instability.

Bailout programs do not constitute enforcement procedure stricto sensu. However, since financial support always entails compliance with several budgetary and economic conditionalities, they can be construed as a sort of ex post enforcement mechanism.

== Reform 2024 ==
On 26 April 2023, the Commission presented three legislative proposals to implement a comprehensive reform of the EU fiscal framework:

- New Regulation on the preventive arm of the SGP: Regulation on the effective coordination of economic policies and multilateral budgetary surveillance, and repealing Council Regulation 1466/97.
- Regulation amending the corrective arm of the SGP: Regulation amending Regulation 1467/97 on speeding up and clarifying the implementation of the excessive deficit procedure.
- Directive amending the Directive on national budgetary frameworks: Council Directive amending Directive 2011/85/EU on requirements for budgetary frameworks of the Member States.

The proposed reform aims to strengthen public debt sustainability, promote sustainable and inclusive growth through reforms and investments, increase national ownership for fiscal plans and fiscal corrections, simplify the legal framework, move towards a greater medium-term approach to budgetary policies, and ensure more effective and coherent enforcement of the fiscal rules.

As per legal assessment of ECB, the Commissions reform proposals also aim to integrate the Title III articles of the European Fiscal Compact (TSCG), and wherever provisions would be different this does not necessitate the subsequent amendment or repeal of the TSCG, because Article 2 of the TSCG ensures that the TSCG provisions will always apply and be interpreted in accordance with the existing economic governance framework of the European Union.

In February 2024, the trilogue negotiations between the co-legislators ended with a provisional political agreement on the Commissions proposal for a comprehensive reform of the SGP rules. The reform will introduce acceptance of a slower adjustment path towards respecting the deficit and debt limit of the SGP, and extend the maximum duration of an Excessive Deficit Procedure from four to seven years if certain reform requirements are respected. The new revised rules will be finally adopted by the European Parliament and Council of Ministers before the 2024 European Parliament election; and fully applied starting from the presented drafts for 2025 budgets. The first "national medium-term fiscal-structural plans" guided by the new revised fiscal rules, will cover the four-year period 2025–2028, and need to be submitted by each member state by 20 September 2024.

The European Parliament is expected to vote on the new Regulation on the preventive arm in April 2024. After the Parliament's approval, the Council of Ministers is expected to adopt the new Regulation, adopt the Regulation amending the corrective arm, and adopt the Directive amending the Directive on national budgetary frameworks. In the meantime, as a new legal framework is not yet in place, the current legal framework continues to apply in spring 2024.

=== SGP changes induced by the reform ===
The reform was adopted and entered into force on 30 April 2024, and induced the following changes to the SGP:

- "National medium-term fiscal-structural plans" submitted annually by 20 September, will integrate and replace the previous "Stability/Convergence programme" and "National Reform Programme" submitted annually in April. While maintaining a 4–5 year time span for the duration of the programme/plan, the intention with the new plans are that the subsequent annually reporting will be limited to progress reports on how the implementation of the original plan is moving forward.
- The maximum duration of an Excessive Deficit Procedure (EDP) will be extended from four to seven years if certain reform requirements are respected, for member states in need of a slower adjustment path towards respecting the deficit and debt limit of the SGP.
- The New debt reduction rule (Regulation 1177/2011) – also known as the debt reduction benchmark, will be repealed. In the future, a debt-based EDP can instead only be triggered for member states having a debt-to-GDP ratio above 60% along with a budget balance deficit, if the control account of the member state at the same time deviates from the country-specific agreed "Net Expenditure Path" by 0.3 percentage points of GDP annually, or 0.6 percentage points of GDP cumulatively. As 2025 will be the first fiscal year subjected to the reformed "Net Expenditure Path", no member state can have the opening of a debt-based EDP in 2024. The procedure for launching a deficit-based EDP, due to a breach of the 3% deficit limit for the general government nominal budget balance, will however not be changed by the reform, and will therefore be assessed already in 2024.
- The Medium-Term budgetary Objective (MTO) and its related "Significant Deviation Procedure" within the preventive arm of the SGP, are both repealed.
- Fiscal surveillance will no longer focus on how the structural budget balance performs, but instead check if the annual percentage change of the "nationally financed net primary expenditure" of the member state stays within the agreed country-specific multi-year net expenditure path, as endorsed by the council. This path will serve as a basis for carrying out annual fiscal surveillance over the lifetime of the Member State's medium-term fiscal-structural plan. The "nationally financed net primary expenditure", represents the figure for the overall general government expenditures but excluding: new additional expenditures financed by discretionary revenue measures such as new taxation measures (as per the word "net"), interest expenditures (as per the word "primary"), cyclical unemployment expenditures (making the figure neutral to the business cycle), national expenditures on co-financing of programmes funded by the EU, and expenditures on EU programmes fully matched by revenue from EU funds.
- For a member state having both a government deficit below the 3% of GDP reference value and public debt below the 60% of GDP reference value, the European Commission will now only provide technical advice upon the request of the concerned member state, on its country-specific target for the Structural Primary Balance necessary in order to ensure that both:
  - The government deficit and debt also stay below both reference values, during its 4–5 year long "National medium-term fiscal-structural plan" plus for an additional assumed no-fiscal-policy-change 10-year period beyond.
  - The government deficit throughout the same 14–15 years period complies with the new "deficit resilience safeguard" (Article 6b), that requires an annual positive fiscal adjustment for the Structural Primary Balance of at least 0.4% of GDP (or 0.25% in case the adjustment period and plan is extended to 7 years) until the structural balance is above or equal to −1.5% of GDP.
  - The technical advice for the Structural Primary Balance target meeting both criteria above, shall be calculated as per the outlined methodology described in the latest "Debt Sustainability Monitor" report. When knowing the recommended Structural Primary Balance target, then the maximum allowed limit for the annual Nominal net primary expenditure growth can be calculated per this formula:

Nominal net primary expenditure growth = yearly potential GDP growth + inflation (as measured by the GDP deflator) – required change in the Structural Primary Balance / primary expenditure-to-GDP ratio

- For member states with a public debt above the 60% of GDP reference value or a government deficit above the 3% of GDP reference value, the European Commission will issue reference trajectories for the country-specific net expenditure path, ensuring a compliance with both reference values for debt and deficit in the future. The net expenditure path set annual limits for how much the net expenditure of the general government can grow, and will be determined and communicated by the European Commission ahead of the publication of the first national medium-term fiscal-structural plan, with a default adjustment period covering the four years of the plan – but with a possible extension of the adjustment period by a maximum of three additional years if certain reform requirements are met. The reference trajectories for the country-specific net expenditure path shall be set in compliance with these five subcriteria:
  - Government deficit is brought and maintained below 3% of GDP by the end of the EDP period.
  - Government deficit shall after being recorded below 3% of GDP, further converge towards a "common resilience margin" below the 3% of GDP deficit limit. This new criteria is called the "deficit resilience safeguard" (Article 6b), that requires a further annual positive fiscal adjustment for the Structural Primary Balance of at least 0.4% of GDP (or 0.25% in case the adjustment period and plan is extended to 7 years) until the structural balance is above or equal to −1.5% of GDP.
  - Projected public debt-to-GDP ratios above 60% shall decrease by a minimum annual average, in line with the debt sustainability safeguard, as per the outlined methodology described in the latest "Debt Sustainability Monitor" report. The debt sustainability safeguard will ensure that the government debt ratio decreases by a minimum annual average of 1% of GDP as long as the member state's debt ratio exceeds 90%, or of 0.5% of GDP as long as the member state's debt ratio remains between 60% and 90%.
  - The fiscal effort over the horizon of the plan is linear and at least proportional to the total effort over the entire adjustment period, and will by default have a duration of 4 years, although it can be extended to 7 years if certain reform requirements are met.
  - While having a nominal budget balance deficit above 3% of GDP, the structural deficit of the general government shall be improved by a fiscal adjustment of minimum 0.5% of GDP per year as a benchmark, even if the four other subcriteria above would allow for a lower annual adjustment. If the four other subcritera demand a higher than 0.5% of GDP annual adjustment, this higher adjustment will be required instead.
- The standard fine in case of non-compliance with the EDP targets, was 0.2% of GDP in the previous version of the SGP, but will after the reform now amount to up to 0.05% of GDP and accumulate every six months until "effective action" by the member state concerned is taken. After the reform "effective action" will be deemed taken, if the net expenditure is corrected to a level in compliance with the agreed "Net Expenditure Path".
- The previous "general escape clause" was not changed by the reform. As activation/deactivation of this clause however covered the entire eurozone/EU as a whole entity, the reform now also introduced a "national escape clause", which may be activated by the Council if this is requested by a member state and recommended by the European Commission. A potential activation of a "national escape clause" would suspend the rules only for the member state concerned for a time-limited period, in the event that exceptional circumstances outside the control of that member state have a major impact on its public finances, but only if the activation itself will not endanger fiscal sustainability in the medium term.

== Member states by SGP criteria ==
Both eurozone and non-eurozone EU member states are subjected to a regular compliance check with the SGP deficit and debt criterion. Minimum one ordinary check per year was conducted for all member states since 1998, and minimum two ordinary checks per year for all eurozone member states since the twopack reform entered into force in 2013. If just one of the two criteria is not complied with when conducting the first numerical check, and the following investigative article 126(3) report of the Commission concludes this "apparent breach" was non-exempted, then there will be the opening of an Excessive Deficit Procedure (EDP) against the concerned member state – declared by the council's adoption of a 126(6) report; and a deadline for the needed correction of the criteria breach – along with annual targets for the structural deficit and nominal budget balance – will be set by the simultaneous adoption of a 126(7) report.

The EDP – also known as the corrective arm of the SGP, was however suspended via activation of the "general escape clause" during 2020–2023 to allow for higher deficit spending; first due to the COVID-19 pandemic arriving as an extraordinary circumstance, and later during 2022–2023 due to the Russian invasion of Ukraine having sent energy prices up, defence spending up and budgetary pressures up across the EU. Despite the EDP suspension in 2020–2023, Romania still experienced the opening of an EDP in April 2020; but only because of existence of a deficit limit breach being recorded already for its 2019 fiscal year, which required corrective action across 2020–2024, to remedy a budgetary imbalance created before 2020.

=== Compliance in 2023 ===
The data in the table below are from the ordinary compliance check of all EU member states in May 2023, with outturn data for the 2022 fiscal year as they were published on the Eurostat website in April 2023, and budget values for 2023–2026 as they were reported by the submitted Stability programme or Convergence programme of each member state in April 2023. 16 out of 27 member states had a technical "SGP criteria breach" when their 2022 fiscal results and 2023 budgets were analyzed in May 2023, but because those breaches were exempted due to the finding of temporary and exceptional circumstances – reflected by the activation of the general escape clause, no new EDPs were opened against those member states.

SGP criteria not fulfilled, EDP corrective action required
SGP criteria not fulfilled, but exempted, no EDP corrective action required
SGP criteria fully complied with

SGP criteria check (May 2023)	Budget balance in % of GDP (worst value in 2022–23)	Debt-to-GDP ratio (in 2022)	EDP periods since 1998 (due to a breach of the deficit or debt rule)	Fiscal years with a deficit above 3.0% (1998–2023)	Number of years with a deficit above 3.0% (1998–2023)
Country	max. -3.0% (or found close at 3.0–3.5% if other subcriteria are met)	max. 60.0% (or sufficiently diminishing over a backward looking period 19‑22 or a forward looking period 21‑24 or a cyclical adjusted period 19‑22)	EDP periods since 1998 (due to a breach of the deficit or debt rule)	Fiscal years with a deficit above 3.0% (1998–2023)	Number of years with a deficit above 3.0% (1998–2023)
Austria	-3.2% (found close to 3%)	78.4% (decreasing fast enough)	2009–14	2004, 2009–10, 2020–22	6
Belgium	-5.1%	105.1% (decreasing fast enough)	2009–14	2009–14, 2020–present	10
Bulgaria	-6.1%	22.9%	2010–12	2009–10, 2014, 2020–21	5
Croatia	-0.7%	68.4% (decreasing fast enough)	2013–17	1999–2004, 2009–15, 2020	14
Cyprus	2.0%	86.5% (decreasing fast enough)	2004–6, 2010–16	1998–99, 2002–4; 2009–14, 2018, 2020	13
(Czech Republic) Czechia	-3.6%	44.1%	2004–8, 2009–14	1998–2003, 2009–10, 2012, 2020–present	13
Denmark	3.3%	30.1%	2010–14	2012	1
Estonia	-4.3%	18.4%	No breaches	1999, 2020, 2023–present	3
Finland	-2.6%	73.0% (increasing)	2010–11	2020	1
France	-4.9%	111.6% (decreasing, but not fast enough)	2003–7, 2009–18	2002–5, 2008–16, 2020–present	17
Germany	-4.25%	66.3% (decreasing fast enough)	2003–7, 2009–12	2002–5, 2009–10, 2020–21	8
Greece	-2.3%	171.3% (decreasing fast enough)	2004–7, 2009–17	1998–2015, 2020–21	20
Hungary	-6.2%	73.3% (decreasing fast enough)	2004–13	1998–99, 2001–11, 2020–present	17
Ireland	1.6%	44.7%	2009–16	2008–14, 2020	8
Italy	-8.0%	144.4% (decreasing, but not fast enough)	2005–8, 2009–13	2001, 2003–6, 2009–11, 2020–present	12
Latvia	-4.4%	40.8%	2009–13	1999, 2008–11, 2020–22	8
Lithuania	-2.2%	38.4%	2009–13	2000–1, 2008–12, 2020	8
Luxembourg	-1.5%	24.6%	No breaches	2020	1
Malta	-5.8%	53.4%	2004–7, 2009–12, 2013–15	1998–2004, 2008–9, 2012, 2020–present	14
Netherlands	-3.0%	51.0%	2004–5, 2009–14	2003, 2009–12, 2020	6
Poland	-4.7%	49.1%	2004–8, 2009–15	1998, 2000–6, 2008–14, 2020, 2022–present	18
Portugal	-0.4%	113.9% (decreasing fast enough)	2005–8, 2009–17	1998, 2000–6, 2008–15, 2020	17
Romania	-6.2%	47.3%	2009–13, 2020–present	1998–2001, 2008–12, 2019–present	14
Slovakia	-6.3%	57.8%	2004–8, 2009–14	1998–2003, 2006, 2009–12, 2014, 2020–21, 2023–present	15
Slovenia	-4.1%	69.9% (decreasing fast enough)	2009–16	2000–1, 2009–14, 2020–21	10
Spain	-4.8%	113.2% (decreasing fast enough)	2009–19	2008–17, 2019–present	15
Sweden	-0.4%	33.0%	No breaches	No breaches	0
(European Union) Eurozone 20 (from 2023)	-3.6%	90.9% (decreasing fast enough)	No EDP possible	2003, 2009–13, 2020–present	10
EU 27 (from 2020)	-3.3% (found close to 3%)	83.5% (decreasing fast enough)	No EDP possible	2003, 2009–12, 2020–present	9
UK (former member)	No longer assessed	No longer assessed	2006–7, 2008–17	2003–5, 2008–16, 2020–present	16

=== Compliance in 2024 ===
The EDP will be assessed again starting from 19 June 2024, where each country will have their usual set of a "2024 National Reform Programme" and "2024 Stability or Convergence Programme" analyzed, with a compliance check of the 2023 fiscal result and 2024 budget with the existing 2019-version of the SGP rules; although only 3% deficit breaches will be evaluated – because no debt limit or debt reduction breach can trigger an EDP in 2024. The European Commission reasoned for its continued deactivation for another year of the debt limit or debt reduction rule in 2023–2024: "that compliance with the debt reduction benchmark could imply a too demanding frontloaded fiscal effort that would risk to jeopardise economic growth. Therefore, in the view of the Commission, compliance with the debt reduction benchmark is not warranted under the prevailing economic conditions."

10 out of 27 member states (Belgium, Czechia, France, Hungary, Italy, Malta, Poland, Romania, Slovakia and Spain) had a technical deficit-based "SGP criteria breach" as per their 2023 fiscal results published by Eurostat in April 2024. The European Commission will await receiving the budget values for 2024–2027 via the submitted Stability programme or Convergence programme of each member state, before deciding whether or not to open an EDP for the concerned member states.

The 2024 SGP compliance table below will be updated with the latest data, as soon as the 2024 stability/convergence programme has been published for each country. The colors used to indicate compliance with the SGP criteria, are only preliminary selected based on whether the reported fiscal data exceeds the criteria limits after taking the commission's latest fiscal policy statements into consideration exempting all debt-related breaches, but without taking any additional factors or subcriteria into consideration when assessing compliance with the deficit criteria. The final assessment for compliance with the SGP criteria of each country, will be published by the European Commission on 19 June 2024, in the form of an article 126(3) assessment report investigating if the "apparent breach" was "real" (indicated by a red color) or can be "exempted" (indicated by a yellow color).

SGP criteria not fulfilled, EDP corrective action required
SGP criteria not fulfilled, but exempted, no EDP corrective action required
SGP criteria fully complied with

SGP criteria check (June 2024)	Budget balance in % of GDP (worst value in 2023–24)	Debt-to-GDP ratio (in 2023)	EDP periods since 1998 (due to a breach of the deficit or debt rule)	Fiscal years with a deficit above 3.0% (1998–2023)	Number of years with a deficit above 3.0% (1998–2023)
Country	max. -3.0% (or found close at 3.0–3.5% if other subcriteria are met)	max. 60.0% (or sufficiently diminishing over a backward looking period 20‑23 or a forward looking period 22‑25 or a cyclical adjusted period 20‑23)	EDP periods since 1998 (due to a breach of the deficit or debt rule)	Fiscal years with a deficit above 3.0% (1998–2023)	Number of years with a deficit above 3.0% (1998–2023)
Austria	-2.7%	77.8% (decreasing fast enough)	2009–14	2004, 2009–10, 2020–22	6
Belgium	-4.4%	105.2% (decreasing fast enough)	2009–14	2009–14, 2020–present	10
Bulgaria	-1.9%	23.1%	2010–12	2009–10, 2014, 2020–21	5
Croatia	-0.7%	63.0% (decreasing fast enough)	2013–17	1999–2004, 2009–15, 2020	14
Cyprus	3.1%	77.3% (decreasing fast enough)	2004–6, 2010–16	1998–99, 2002–4; 2009–14, 2018, 2020	13
(Czech Republic) Czechia	-3.7%	44.0%	2004–8, 2009–14	1998–2003, 2009–10, 2012, 2020–present	13
Denmark	3.1%	29.3%	2010–14	2012	1
Estonia	-3.4% (found close to 3%)	19.6%	No breaches	1999, 2020, 2023–present	3
Finland	-3.4% (found close to 3%)	75.8% (increasing)	2010–11	2020	1
France	-5.5%	110.6% (decreasing, but not fast enough)	2003–7, 2009–18	2002–5, 2008–16, 2020–present	17
Germany	-2.5%	63.6% (decreasing fast enough)	2003–7, 2009–12	2002–5, 2009–10, 2020–21	8
Greece	-1.6%	161.9% (decreasing fast enough)	2004–7, 2009–17	1998–2015, 2020–21	20
Hungary	-6.7%	73.5% (decreasing fast enough)	2004–13	1998–99, 2001–11, 2020–present	17
Ireland	1.7%	43.7%	2009–16	2008–14, 2020	8
Italy	-7.4%	137.3% (decreasing, but not fast enough)	2005–8, 2009–13	2001, 2003–6, 2009–11, 2020–present	12
Latvia	-2.2%	43.6%	2009–13	1999, 2008–11, 2020–22	8
Lithuania	-0.8%	38.3%	2009–13	2000–1, 2008–12, 2020	8
Luxembourg	-1.3%	25.7%	No breaches	2020	1
Malta	-4.9%	50.4%	2004–7, 2009–12, 2013–15	1998–2004, 2008–9, 2012, 2020–present	14
Netherlands	-0.3%	46.5%	2004–5, 2009–14	2003, 2009–12, 2020	6
Poland	-5.1%	49.6%	2004–8, 2009–15	1998, 2000–6, 2008–14, 2020, 2022–present	18
Portugal	1.2%	99.1% (decreasing fast enough)	2005–8, 2009–17	1998, 2000–6, 2008–15, 2020	17
Romania	-6.6%	48.8%	2009–13, 2020–present	1998–2001, 2008–12, 2019–present	14
Slovakia	-4.9%	56.0%	2004–8, 2009–14	1998–2003, 2006, 2009–12, 2014, 2020–21, 2023–present	15
Slovenia	-2.5%	69.2% (decreasing fast enough)	2009–16	2000–1, 2009–14, 2020–21	10
Spain	-3.6%	107.7% (decreasing fast enough)	2009–19	2008–17, 2019–present	15
Sweden	-1.2%	31.2%	No breaches	No breaches	0
(European Union) Eurozone 20 (from 2023)	-3.6%	88.6% (decreasing fast enough)	No EDP possible	2003, 2009–13, 2020–present	10
EU 27 (from 2020)	-3.5% (found close to 3%)	81.7% (decreasing fast enough)	No EDP possible	2003, 2009–12, 2020–present	9
UK (former member)	No longer assessed	No longer assessed	2006–7, 2008–17	2003–5, 2008–16, 2020–present	16

An article 126(3) assessment report can declare an apparent numerical breach "exempted" and hereby "accepted", if the breach in example was solely caused by "extra expenditures caused by implementation of structural improving pension reforms" or "payment of bailout funds to financial stability mechanisms" or "payment of national funds to the European Fund for Strategic Investments" or "appearance of an EU-wide recession" or "other temporary and extraordinary expences specifically allowed by the currently agreed fiscal policy of the EU". Any non-exempted breach of either the deficit or debt criteria of the Stability and Growth Pact declared by a 126(3) report, will however result in the publication of a 126(6) report and 126(7) report shortly afterwards, in which the council will be recommended to open an EDP and set a deadline for when the breaching of the criteria shall have been corrected by the member state. If any EDP recommendation is issued by the Commission in June, then the EDP is expected to be formally adopted and opened by the Council in July.

== Medium-Term budgetary Objective (MTO) ==
=== 1999–2005 ===
Across the first seven years, since the entry into force of the Stability and Growth Pact, all EU Member States were required to strive towards a common MTO being "to achieve a budgetary position of close to balance or in surplus over a complete business cycle – while providing a safety margin towards continuously respecting the government's 3% deficit limit". The first part of this MTO, was interpreted by the Commission Staff Service to mean continuously achievement each year throughout the business cycle of a "cyclically-adjusted budget balance net of one-off and temporary measures" (also referred to as the "structural balance") at minimum 0.0%. In 2000, the second part was interpreted and operationalized into a calculation formula for the MTO also to respect the so-called "Minimal Benchmark" (later referred to as "MTO Minimum Benchmark"). When assessing the annual Convergence/Stability programmes of the Member States, the Commission Staff Service checked whether the structural balance of the state complied with both the common "close to balance or surplus" criteria and the country-specific "Minimal Benchmark" criteria. The last round under this assessment scheme took place in Spring 2005, while all subsequent assessments were conducted according to a new reformed scheme – introducing the concept of a single country-specific MTO as the overall steering anchor for the fiscal policy.

=== Calculation of a country-specific Minimum MTO (2005–present) ===
In order to ensure long-term compliance with the SGP deficit and debt criteria, the member states have since the SGP-reform in March 2005 striven towards achieving their country-specific Medium-Term budgetary Objective (MTO). The MTO is the set limit, that the structural balance relative to GDP needs to equal or be above for each year in the medium-term. Each state selects its own MTO, but it needs to equal or be better than a calculated minimum requirement (Minimum MTO) ensuring sustainability of the government accounts throughout the long-term (calculated on basis of both future potential GDP growth, future cost of government debt, and future increases in age-related costs).

The structural balance is calculated by the European Commission as the cyclically adjusted balance minus "one-off measures" (i.e. one-off payments due to reforming a pension scheme). The cyclically adjusted balance is calculated by adjusting the achieved general government balance (in % of GDP) compared to each year's relative economic growth position in the business cycle (referred to as the "output gap"), which is found by subtraction of the achieved GDP growth with the potential GDP growth. So, if a year is recorded with average GDP growth in the business cycle (equal to the potential GDP growth rate), the output gap will then be zero, meaning that the "cyclically-adjusted balance" then will be equal to the "government budget balance". In this way, because it is resistant to GDP growth changes, the structural balance is considered to be neutral and comparable across an entire business cycle (including both recession years and "overheated years"), making it perfect to be used consistently as a medium-term budgetary objective.

Whenever a country does not reach its MTO, it is required in the subsequent year(s) to implement annual improvements for its structural balance equal to minimum 0.5% of GDP, although several sub-rules (including the "expenditure benchmark") has the potential slightly to alter this requirement. When Member States are in this process of improving their structural balance until it reaches its MTO, they are referred to as being on the "adjustment path", and they shall annually report an updated target year for when they expect to reach their MTO. It is the responsibility of each Member State through a note in their annual Convergence/Stability report, to select their contemporary MTO at a point being equal to or above the "minimum MTO" calculated every third year by the European Commission (most recently in October 2012). The "minimum MTO" that the "nationally selected MTO" needs to respect, is equal to the strictest of the following three limits (which since a method change in 2012 now automatically is rounded to the lowest 1/4-value, if calculated to a figure with the last two digits after punctuation differing from 00/25/50/75, i.e. -0.51% will be rounded to −0.75%):

(1) MTO^{MB} (the Minimum Benchmark, adds a public budget safety margin to ensure the 3%-limit will be respected during economic downturns)

(2) MTO^{ILD} (the minimum value ensuring long-term sustainability of public budgets taking into account the Implicit Liabilities and Debt, aiming to ensure convergence across a long-term horizon of debt ratios towards prudent levels below 60% with due consideration to the forecast budgetary impact of ageing populations)

(3) MTO^{ea/erm2/fc} (Council Regulation 1466/97 of the SGP explicitly defined a −1.0% limit applying for eurozone states or ERM2 members already in 2005; but if having committed to a stricter requirement through ratification and bound acceptance of Title III of the Fiscal Compact, a stricter −0.5% limit will replace it whenever the debt-to-GDP ratio of the member state exceeds 60%).

Formula used to calculate the MTO Minimum Benchmark
- MTO^{MB} = –3% – ε × ROG
- ROG = $\tfrac{Ni}{(Nt+Ni)}$ × P_{5% state} + $\tfrac{Nt}{(Nt+Ni)}$ × P_{5% EU27}
- ε stands for the country-specific semi-elasticity of the government budget balance to output gap. Normally these figures are only recalculated every third year. However, after its latest recalculation in October 2012, the following 2014 revision by OECD of individual revenue and expenditure elasticities prompted the Commission to recalculate the semi-elasticities again in November 2014.; ROG stands for the Representative Output Gap, which gets recalculated every third year for the latest 25-year period (last time Oct.2012, for the 1986–2010 period). Based on the historic distribution of output gap data, the ROG figure attempts to identify the most negative output gap appearing across a full business cycle by a 95% likelihood. It is calculated by a formula comprising the following parameters: P_{5% state} represents the 5% percentile of the distribution of the country-specific output gap series for the latest 25-year period (1986–2010).; P_{5% EU27} represents the 5% percentile of the output gap data for all countries for the latest 25-year period (1986–2010).; The above 5% percentiles are computed after outlier values are deleted. Outliers are defined as observations of the distribution for the entire sample – including all Member States – below and above, respectively the 2.5% and 97.5% percentiles. Exceptionally, it has also been decided to trim the country-specific series of their most negative value achieved in either 2009 or 2010, as this last financial economic crisis cannot be considered as a normal cyclical fluctuation.; N_{i} and N_{t} stand for the number of country-specific and common annual observations available, respectively, over a period of 25 years. Meaning that N_{t}=25, while N_{i} can be lower for some states due to absence of available cyclically-adjusted budget data for them in the earliest years. For states with N_{i}=25, the ROG is the simple average of the two percentiles: ROG = (P_{5% state} + P_{5% EU27})/2.

Formula for the MTO limit due to Implicit Liabilities and Debt
- MTO^{ILD} = BB_{stable debt} + BB_{debt reduction} + BB_{LTC}
- BB_{stable debt} = -(60×g_{pot})/(1+g_{pot})
- BB_{debt reduction} = 0.024×D_{t-1} – 1.24
- BB_{LTC} = 0.33×S2_{COA}
- BB_{stable debt} stands for the Budget Balance in structural terms needed, so that a fictive 60% debt-to-GDP ratio at the beginning is kept stable throughout an infinite (50 year) time horizon – while solely taking the impact of nominal GDP growth into concern.; BB_{debt reduction} stands for the Budget Balance in structural terms needed to conduct a supplementary debt reduction effort for countries whose debt exceeds 60% of GDP. The provided formula for debt reduction is not applied (BB_{debt reduction}=0) if the debt-to-GDP ratio was less than 60% by the end of the latest completed fiscal year.; BB_{LTC} stands for a proportion (33%) of the Budget Balance adjustment needed to cover the present value of the future increase in age-related expenditure (the budget cost of the Long-Term Component).; g_{pot} stands for the country-specific long-term average potential growth rate for GDP in nominal terms, projected every third year by the Ageing Working Group as an average figure for the next 50 years (latest in Nov.2014, for 2013–60). The referenced latest figures are given in real terms, and shall be adjusted to nominal terms before input in the formula, which is done for all countries by adding AWG's common inflation (GDP deflator) assumption for the period of 2.0%.; D_{t-1} stands for the general government's debt-to-GDP ratio (in gross terms) by the end of the latest completed fiscal year.; S2_{COA} represents the fiscal adjustment in structural balance terms being needed to finance the country's Costs Of Ageing (COA) throughout 2010–2060. The S2 debt sustainability indicator is calculated as S2_{IBP}+S2_{COA}, and gets recalculated every third year by the Commission's Fiscal Sustainability Report (latest in Oct.2012). The reason why the formula only include 33% of the S2_{COA} as current and constant saving needs throughout the years (to lower the debt further or be put aside as reserve liquidity at public saving accounts to cover future increases for age-related costs), is the assumption the state will find the remaining 67% of needed funds through later implementation of cost saving or revenue increasing structural reforms that will deliver the remaining part of the required improvement for the government budget balance.

The third minimum limit listed above (MTO^{ea/erm2/fc}), mean that EU member states having ratified the Fiscal Compact and being bound by its fiscal provisions in Title III (which requires a special additional declaration of intent for non-eurozone member states), are obliged to select a MTO which does not exceed a structural deficit of 1.0% of GDP at maximum if they have a debt-to-GDP ratio significantly below 60%, and of 0.5% of GDP maximum if they have a debt-to-GDP ratio above 60%. In 2013–22, the following six states were not bound by the fiscal provisions of the Fiscal Compact: UK, Czech Republic, Croatia, Poland, Sweden, Hungary. Croatia became bound by the Fiscal Compact provisions and its stricter −0.5% limit when they adopted the euro on 1 January 2023, and were bound by the −1.0% limit while being an ERM-2 member from 10 July 2020 until 31 December 2022. Those of the non-eurozone member states neither being ERM-2 members nor having committed to respect the fiscal provisions of the Fiscal Compact (Czech Republic, Poland, Sweden, and Hungary, as of April 2024), will still be required to set a national MTO respecting the calculated "minimum MTO" being equal to the strictest limit set by MTO^{MB} and MTO^{ILD}.

The only EU member state ever exempted from complying with this MTO procedure outlined above, was the former member UK, as it was exempted from complying with the SGP per a protocol to the EU treaty. In other words, while all other member states are obliged nationally to select a MTO respecting their calculated Minimum MTO, the calculated Minimum MTO for the UK were only presented by the European Commission for advice, with no obligation for the UK to set a compliant national MTO in structural terms.

The Minimum MTOs are recalculated every third year by the Economic and Financial Committee, based on the above-described procedure and formulas, that among others require the prior publication of the commission's triennial Ageing Report. Although member states having an open "macroeconomic adjustment programme" covering the entire first year of which a recalculated "Minimum MTO" should have applied, shall not be subject to recalculation of its MTO^{ILD} due to an ongoing implementation of structural reforms as part of that program, and consequently will not be bound by any "Minimum MTO" for this specific three‑year period (i.e. Greece in 2012–15 and 2015–18, while a "Minimum MTO was calculated for 2010 due to its first 2010–12 programme only starting in May 2010). A Member State can also have its Minimum MTO updated outside the ordinary three‑year schedule, if it implements structural reforms with a major impact on the long-term sustainability of public finances (i.e. a major pension reform) – and subsequently submit a formal request for an extraordinary recalculation.

In example, after the ordinary recalculation of minimum MTOs had been conducted by the Commission staff service in autumn 2012, based partially on input values from the 2012 Ageing report published in November 2011, many extraordinary recalculations were subsequently conducted during 2013–14. The MTO^{ILD} limits for Belgium, Denmark, Hungary and the Netherlands were revised in 2013, due to the impact of their 2012 pension reforms only subsequently being incorporated for some updated S2_{COA} values in the Commission's Fiscal Sustainability Report 2012 released on 18 December 2012. The MTO^{ILD} limits were also later revised in a similar fashion for Spain, Poland, Latvia, Slovakia, and Slovenia, as the data impact from their 2012 enacted pension reforms had only been assessed with publication of some revised S2_{COA} values by graph 5.4 in the July 2014 report entitled 2014 Stability and Convergence Programmes: An Overview. The revised S2_{COA} values due to enacted pension reforms consequently changed the calculated MTO^{ILD} limits to less strict limits, for all of the concerned countries.

In March 2017, the Commission made a commitment to begin updating the MTO minimum benchmark (MTO^{MB}) annually in March/April (based on recalculated ROG input data from its latest autumn economic forecast), as the MTO^{MB} had become a critical part of how the recently introduced "Flexibility Clauses" (a collective term for the "Structural Reform Clause" and "Investment Clause") were applied, when making the annual assessment of compliance with the deficit and debt criteria for each member state within the preventive arm of the SGP. Except from the situation where a member state request an extraordinary recalculation of its MTO^{ILD} (due to implementation of major structural reforms), all calculated "Minimum MTOs" will however remain frozen for the entire three‑year period it covers, and not be changed by the annually revised MTO^{MB}.

The table below, display the input data and calculated Minimum MTOs only from the five latest ordinary recalculations, with no display of any potential extraordinary recalculations in between.

Calculation of a country-specific Minimum MTO for all EU member states (2010–2024)
EU member state	Calcu- lation apply for the period	Semi‑ elasticity of budget balance to output gap (ε)	Repre- senta- tive Output Gap (ROG)	Debt in % of GDP by end of last year (D_{t-1})	Average nominal GDP growth 2010–60 (g_{pot})	S2_{COA} adjustment needed to finance age‑related costs	MTO^{MB}	MTO^{ILD}	MTO^{ea/erm2/fc}	Minimum MTO (highest MTO value rounded)
Austria	2010–12			62.5%	3.7%	3.0%	-1.6%	-0.89%	−1.0%	-1.0%
Austria	2013–16	0.488		72.4%	3.391%	3.6%	−1.8%	-0.28%	−0.5%	-0.5%
Austria	2017–19	0.580		84.53%	3.476%	2.4%	-1.6%	−0.43% rev: -0.75%	-0.5%	-0.5%
Austria	2020–22	0.571					-1.5%	-0.75%	-0.5%	-0.5%
Austria	2023–24									
Belgium	2010–12			89.6%	3.8%	4.7%	-1.3%	0.26%	-1.0%	0.25%
Belgium	2013–16	0.553		97.8%	3.633%	6.4%	-1.7%	1.12%	-0.5%	1.0%
Belgium	2017–19	0.605		106.49%	3.750%	3.9%	-1.7%	0.43% rev: -0.5%	-0.5%	0.25% rev: -0.5%
Belgium	2020–22	0.615					-1.5%	0.0%	-0.5%	0.0%
Belgium	2023–24									
Bulgaria	2010–12			14.1%	3.7%	1.3%	-1.8%	-1.71%	–	-1.75%
Bulgaria	2013–16	0.322		16.3%	3.320%	2.3%	-1.7%	-1.17%	-1.0%	-1.0%
Bulgaria	2017–19	0.308		27.62%	3.457%	0.2%	-2.1%	-1.94% rev: -2.25%	-1.0%	-1.0%
Bulgaria	2020–22	0.298					-1.3%	-1.25%	-1.0%	-1.0%
Bulgaria	2023–24									
Croatia	2010–12	N/A	N/A	32.2%	N/A	N/A	N/A	N/A	–	N/A
Croatia	2013–16	N/A	N/A	46.7%	N/A	N/A	N/A	N/A	–	N/A
Croatia	2017–19	0.467		84.99%	3.382%	-2.6%	-1.5%	-2.02%	–	-1.5%
Croatia	2020–22	0.443					-1.2%			
Croatia	2023–24									
Cyprus	2010–12			49.1%	4.8%	8.2%	-1.8%	-0.04%	-1.0%	0.0%
Cyprus	2013–16	0.434		71.1%	3.826%	5.4%	-1.8%	0.04%	-0.5%	0.0%
Cyprus	2017–19	0.523		107.50%	3.887%	N/A	-1.6%	N/A	−0.5%	N/A
Cyprus	2020–22	0.504					-0.8%			
Cyprus	2023–24									
Czechia	2010–12			29.8%	3.6%	3.5%	-1.6%	-0.93%	–	-1.0%
Czechia	2013–16	0.391		40.8%	3.549%	3.8%	-1.7%	-0.80%	–	-1.0%
Czechia	2017–19	0.433		42.57%	3.586%	2.5%	-1.7%	-1.25%	–	-1.25%
Czechia	2020–22	0.395					-1.5%			
Czechia	2023–24									
Denmark	2010–12			33.3%	3.8%	1.6%	-0.5%	-1.67%	-1.0%	-0.5%
Denmark	2013–16	0.607=0.63	-3.64%	46.6%	3.444%	1.7%	-0.7%	−1.44%	−1.0%	-0.75%
Denmark	2017–19	0.619		45.22%	3.772%	-0.4%	-0.9%	-2.31%	-1.0%	-1.0%
Denmark	2020–22	0.589					-1.3%			
Denmark	2023–24									
Estonia	2010–12			4.8%	3.8%	-0.3%	-1.9%	-2.30%	-1.0%	-1.0%
Estonia	2013–16	0.297		6.1%	3.495%	0.7%	-1.8%	-1.80%	-1.0%	-1.0%
Estonia	2017–19	0.443		10.61%	3.474%	0.4%	-1.7%	-1.88%	-1.0%	-1.0%
Estonia	2020–22	0.486					-0.7%			
Estonia	2023–24									
Finland	2010–12			33.4%	3.7%	4.7%	-1.2%	-0.59%	-1.0%	-0.5%
Finland	2013–16	0.526		49.0%	3.527%	4.9%	-0.5%	-0.43%	-0.5%	-0.5%
Finland	2017–19	0.574		59.33%	3.383%	1.9%	-1.1%	-1.34%	-0.5%	-0.5%
Finland	2020–22	0.582					-1.0%			
Finland	2023–24									
France	2010–12			68.0%	3.9%	1.9%	-1.6%	-1.23%	-1.0%	-1.0%
France	2013–16	0.546		86.0%	3.652%	0.9%	-1.6%	-0.99%	-0.5%	-0.5%
France	2017–19	0.603		95.02%	3.578%	-1.1%	-1.3%	-1.40%	-0.5%	-0.5%
France	2020–22	0.630					-1.4%			
France	2023–24									
Germany	2010–12			65.9%	3.2%	3.1%	-1.6%	-0.50%	-1.0%	-0.5%
Germany	2013–16	0.562		80.5%	2.837%	2.4%	-1.5%	-0.17%	-0.5%	-0.25%
Germany	2017–19	0.551		74.73%	2.961%	2.5%	-1.5%	-0.35%	-0.5%	-0.5%
Germany	2020–22	0.504					-1.5%			
Germany	2023–24									
Greece	2010–12			97.6%	3.7%	11.4%	-1.4%	2.72%	-1.0%	2.75%
Greece	2013–16	0.473		170.6%	2.994%	N/A	-1.9%	N/A	-0.5%	N/A
Greece	2017–19	0.483		177.07%	2.669%	N/A	-2.1%	N/A	−0.5%	N/A
Greece	2020–22	0.524					-0.7%			
Greece	2023–24									
Hungary	2010–12			73.0%	3.7%	1.4%	-1.6%	-1.17%	–	-1.25%
Hungary	2013–16	0.470		81.4%	3.157%	0.3%	-1.5%	-1.02%	–	-1.25%
Hungary	2017–19	0.492		76.90%	3.478%	0.7%	-1.4%	-1.18%	–	-1.25%
Hungary	2020–22	0.453					-1.5%			
Hungary	2023–24									
Ireland	2010–12			43.2%	4.4%	6.7%	-1.5%	-0.32%	-1.0%	-0.25%
Ireland	2013–16	0.505		106.4%	4.094%	N/A	-1.2%	N/A	-0.5%	-0.5%
Ireland	2017–19	0.528		109.66%	3.715%	2.2%	-1.3%	-0.03%	-0.5%	-0.25%
Ireland	2020–22	0.522					-1.2%			
Ireland	2023–24									
Italy	2010–12			105.8%	3.5%	1.4%	-1.4%	-0.27%	-1.0%	-0.25%
Italy	2013–16	0.547		120.7%	3.327%	0.7%	-1.7%	-0.04%	-0.5%	-0.25%
Italy	2017–19	0.539		132.11%	3.298%	-0.2%	-1.5%	-0.05%	-0.5%	-0.25%
Italy	2020–22	0.544					-1.4%			
Italy	2023–24									
Latvia	2010–12			19.5%	3.4%	0.7%	-2.0%	-1.74%	-1.0%	-1.0%
Latvia	2013–16	0.310		42.2%	3.134%	-1.5%	-1.8%	-2.32%	-1.0%	-1.0%
Latvia	2017–19	0.380		40.04%	3.552%	-0.4%	-1.7%	-2.19%	-1.0%	-1.0%
Latvia	2020–22	0.378					-0.9%			
Latvia	2023–24									
Lithuania	2010–12			15.6%	3.5%	3.0%	-1.9%	-1.04%	-1.0%	-1.0%
Lithuania	2013–16	0.305		38.5%	3.283%	3.8%	-1.8%	-0.65%	-1.0%	-0.75%
Lithuania	2017–19	0.413		40.86%	3.235%	2.8%	-1.5%	-0.96%	-1.0%	-1.0%
Lithuania	2020–22	0.399					-0.9%			
Lithuania	2023–24									
Luxembourg	2010–12			14.7%	4.6%	12.6%	-1.0%	1.52%	-1.0%	1.5%
Luxembourg	2013–16	0.471		18.3%	3.931%	8.5%	-1.7%	0.54%	-1.0%	0.5%
Luxembourg	2017–19	0.445		23.61%	4.499%	4.9%	-1.5%	-0.97%	-1.0%	-1.0%
Luxembourg	2020–22	0.462					-1.3%			
Luxembourg	2023–24									
Malta	2010–12			64.1%	3.7%	5.8%	-1.7%	0.07%	-1.0%	0.0%
Malta	2013–16	0.403		70.9%	3.449%	4.9%	-1.9%	0.08%	-0.5%	0.0%
Malta	2017–19	0.456		68.05%	3.719%	4.8%	-1.8%	-0.17%	-0.5%	-0.25%
Malta	2020–22	0.479					-1.5%			
Malta	2023–24									
Netherlands	2010–12			58.2%	3.5%	5.1%	-1.1%	-0.35%	-1.0%	-0.25%
Netherlands	2013–16	0.566		65.5%	3.288%	4.0%	-1.4%	-0.26%	-0.5%	-0.5%
Netherlands	2017–19	0.646		68.82%	3.199%	2.0%	-1.1%	-0.79%	-0.5%	-0.5%
Netherlands	2020–22	0.605					-1.5%			
Netherlands	2023–24									
Poland	2010–12			47.2%	3.5%	-1.7%	-1.5%	-2.59%	–	-1.5%
Poland	2013–16	0.404		56.4%	3.526%	1.1%	-1.9%	-1.68%	–	-1.75%
Poland	2017–19	0.521		50.13%	3.617%	1.0%	-1.0%	-1.76%	–	-1.0%
Poland	2020–22	0.499					-1.4%			
Poland	2023–24									
Portugal	2010–12			66.4%	3.9%	1.9%	-1.5%	-1.27%	-1.0%	-1.0%
Portugal	2013–16	0.463		108.1%	3.210%	N/A	-1.8%	N/A	-0.5%	-0.5%
Portugal	2017–19	0.506		130.18%	2.900%	0.7%	-1.6%	0.42%	-0.5%	0.25%
Portugal	2020–22	0.538					-1.3%			
Portugal	2023–24									
Romania	2010–12			13.6%	3.8%	4.7%	-1.8%	-0.65%	–	-0.75%
Romania	2013–16	0.329		33.4%	3.106%	3.6%	-1.8%	-0.62%	-1.0%	-0.75%
Romania	2017–19	0.339		39.81%	3.612%	1.5%	-1.6%	-1.60%	-1.0%	-1.0%
Romania	2020–22	0.321					-1.2%			
Romania	2023–24									
Slovakia	2010–12			27.6%	3.7%	2.6%	-2.0%	-1.28%	-1.0%	-1.0%
Slovakia	2013–16	0.332		43.3%	3.643%	5.1%	-1.5%	-0.43%	-1.0%	-0.5%
Slovakia	2017–19	0.393		53.58%	3.532%	2.1%	-1.7%	-1.35%	-1.0%	-1.0%
Slovakia	2020–22	0.381					-1.4%			
Slovakia	2023–24									
Slovenia	2010–12			22.8%	3.4%	8.3%	-1.6%	0.77%	-1.0%	0.75%
Slovenia	2013–16	0.461		46.9%	3.322%	6.6%	-1.7%	0.25%	-1.0%	0.25%
Slovenia	2017–19	0.477		80.90%	3.300%	5.5%	-1.4%	0.60%	-0.5%	0.5%
Slovenia	2020–22	0.468					-1.1%			
Slovenia	2023–24									
Spain	2010–12			39.5%	3.9%	5.7%	-1.2%	-0.37%	-1.0%	-0.25%
Spain	2013–16	0.476		69.3%	3.577%	1.9%	-1.5%	-1.02%	-0.5%	-0.5%
Spain	2017–19	0.539		97.67%	3.389%	-0.8%	-1.1%	-1.13%	-0.5%	-0.5%
Spain	2020–22	0.597					-0.8%			
Spain	2023–24									
Sweden	2010–12			38.0%	3.9%	1.5%	-1.0%	-1.76%	–	-1.0%
Sweden	2013–16	0.589		38.4%	3.752%	2.7%	-0.9%	-1.28%	–	-1.0%
Sweden	2017–19	0.590		43.89%	4.038%	1.0%	-1.0%	-2.00%	–	-1.0%
Sweden	2020–22	0.553					-1.4%			
Sweden	2023–24									
UK (former member)	2010–12			52.0%	4.1%	3.5%	-1.4%	-1.21%	–	-1.25%
UK (former member)	2013–16	0.482		85.0%	3.864%	2.6%	-1.5%	-0.57%	–	-0.75%
UK (former member)	2017–19	0.591		89.36%	3.665%	2.4%	-1.1%	-0.42%	–	-0.5%
UK (former member)	2020–22	0.550					-1.4%			
UK (former member)	2023–24									
References for 2010-12 (calculated Apr.2009): Spring input values were utilized, and not the revised Oct.2009 figures References for 2013-16 (calculated Oct.2012):

=== Nationally selected MTOs (2005–present) ===
Whenever a "Minimum MTO" gets recalculated for a country, the announcement of a "nationally selected MTO" that is equal to or above this recalculated "Minimum MTO" shall occur as part of the following ordinary stability/convergence report, while only taking effect compliance-wise for the fiscal account(s) in the years after the new "nationally selected MTO" has been announced. The tables below have listed all country-specific MTOs selected by national governments throughout 2005–2015, and colored each year red/green to display whether or not the "nationally selected MTO" was achieved, according to the latest revision of the structural balance data as calculated by the "European Commission method". Some states, i.e. Denmark and Latvia, apply a national method to calculate the structural balance figures reported in their convergence report (which greatly differs from the results of the commission's method), but for the sake of presenting comparable results for all Member States, the "MTO achieved" coloring of the tables (and if not met also the noted forecast year of reaching it) is decided solely by the results of the commission's calculation method.

Country- specific MTOs (structural balance, % of GDP)	2005	2006	2007	2008	2009	2010
Austria	N/A ⇔ 0.0% in 2008	0.0% in 2008			0.0% earliest 2013	0.0% earliest 2013
Belgium	N/A ⇔ 0.0%	+0.5% in 2008			+0.5% earliest 2014	+0.5% earliest 2013
Bulgaria	Outside EU	Outside EU	0.0% in 2007	+1.5% in 2008	+1.5% in 2009	+0.5% in 2010
Cyprus	N/A ⇔ 0.0% earliest 2009	-0.5% earliest 2010			0.0% earliest 2013	0.0% earliest 2013
Czech Republic	N/A ⇔ 0.0% earliest 2008	-1.0% earliest 2009			-1.0% earliest 2012	-1.0% earliest 2013
Denmark	+1.5% to +2.5% revised: +0.5% to +1.5%	+0.5% to +1.5%	+0.5% to +1.5%	+0.75% to +1.75%	+0.75% to +1.75%	0.0% earliest 2016
Estonia	N/A ⇔ 0.0%	0.0%			0.0% in 2010	0.0%
Finland	N/A ⇔ +0.8%	+1.5%			+2.0%	+0.5% earliest 2013
France	N/A ⇔ 0.0% earliest 2009	0.0% earliest 2010			0.0% earliest 2013	0.0% earliest 2013
Germany	N/A ⇔ 0.0% earliest 2009	0.0% earliest 2010			-0.5% to 0.0% earliest 2013	-0.5% earliest 2013
Greece	N/A ⇔ 0.0% earliest 2008	0.0% earliest 2009			0.0% earliest 2012	0.0% earliest 2014
Hungary	N/A ⇔ 0.0% earliest 2009	-1.0% to −0.5% earliest 2009			-0.5% earliest 2012	-1.5% in 2010
Ireland	N/A ⇔ 0.0%	0.0%	0.0%	0.0%	-0.5% to 0.0% earliest 2014	-0.5% earliest 2013
Italy	N/A ⇔ 0.0% earliest 2009	0.0% earliest 2010			0.0% earliest 2012	0.0% earliest 2013
Latvia	N/A ⇔ 0.0% earliest 2008	-1.0% in 2008			-1.0% earliest 2012	-1.0% earliest 2013
Lithuania	N/A ⇔ 0.0% earliest 2008	-1.0% earliest 2009			-1.0% in 2010	+0.5% earliest 2013
Luxembourg	N/A ⇔ +0.1%	-0.8% in 2007			-0.8%	+0.5% earliest 2013
Malta	N/A ⇔ 0.0% in 2007	0.0% in 2008			0.0% in 2011	0.0% earliest 2013
Netherlands	N/A ⇔ 0.0% earliest 2008	-1.0% to −0.5% in 2009			-1.0% to −0.5%	-0.5% earliest 2013
Poland	N/A ⇔ 0.0% earliest 2008	-1.0% earliest 2009			-1.0% earliest 2012	-1.0% earliest 2013
Portugal	N/A ⇔ 0.0% earliest 2009	-0.5% earliest 2010			-0.5% earliest 2012	-0.5% earliest 2013
Romania	Outside EU	Outside EU	-0.9%	-0.9%	-0.9% in 2010	-0.7% earliest 2013
Slovakia	N/A ⇔ 0.0% earliest 2008	-0.9% earliest 2009			-0.8% earliest 2012	0.0% earliest 2013
Slovenia	N/A ⇔ 0.0% earliest 2008	-1.0% in 2008			-1.0% earliest 2012	-1.0% earliest 2013
Spain	N/A ⇔ 0.0%	0.0%			0.0% earliest 2012	0.0% earliest 2013
Sweden	+2.0% revised: +1.0% in 2007	+2.0% revised: +1.0% in 2007	+2.0% revised: +1.0%	+1.0%	+1.0%	+1.0% in 2010
United Kingdom (former member)	N/A ⇔ 0.0% earliest 2009–10; Golden rule, no CACB target Min.MTO = 0.0%	N/A ⇔ -1.0% earliest 2010–11; Golden rule, no CACB target Min.MTO = -1.0%	N/A ⇔ -1.0% Golden rule, no CACB target Min.MTO = -1.0%	N/A ⇔ -1.0% Golden rule, no CACB target Min.MTO = -1.0%	N/A ⇔ -1.0% earliest 2014–15; CACB=0.0% in 2015–16; Min.MTO = -1.0%	N/A ⇔ -1.0% earliest 2013–14; CACB=0.0% in 2017–18; Min.MTO = -1.0%

MTO not reached (as per the latest data calculated by the EC method in May 2015), with note of the forecast year to reach it (as per the concurrent EC forecast made on basis of the national stability programme)
MTO reached (as per the latest data calculated by the EC method in May 2015)

Note A: Setting country-specific MTOs only became mandatory starting from the 2006 fiscal year. However, Denmark and Sweden by own initiative already did so for 2005. For states without a country-specific MTO in 2005, the green/red compliance color in this specific year indicate, if the structural balance of the state complied with both the common "close to balance or surplus" (min. 0.0%) target and the country-specific "minimum benchmark". The latter only being stricter for two states in 2005, effectively setting a +0.8% target for Finland, +0.1% target for Luxembourg, and a 0.0% target for the rest of the states to respect.

Note B: Due to Eurostat implementing a significant method change for the calculation of budget balances (classifying "funded defined-contribution pension schemes" outside of the government's budget balance), which technically reduced revenues and budget balance data by 1% of GDP for states with such schemes, the earliest MTOs presented by Sweden and Denmark were technically adjusted to be 1% lower, in order to be comparable with the structural balance data calculated by the latest Eurostat method. When MTO-target compliance is checked for in 2005–07, by looking at the structural balance data calculated by the latest Eurostat method, this compliance check is conducted of the "technically-adjusted MTO-targets" rather than the "originally reported MTO-targets" for Denmark and Sweden.

Note about UK: Paragraph 4 of Treaty Protocol No 15, exempts UK from the obligation in Article 126(1+9+11) of the Treaty on the Functioning of the European Union to avoid excessive general government deficits, for as long as the state opts not to adopt the euro. Paragraph 5 of the same protocol however still provides that the "UK shall endeavour to avoid an excessive government deficit". On one hand, this means that the Commission and Council still approach the UK with EDP recommendations whenever excessive deficits are found, but on the other hand, they legally cannot launch any sanctions against the UK if they do not comply with the recommendations. Due to its special exemption, the UK also did not incorporate the additional MTO adjustment rules introduced by the 2005 SGP reform and six-pack reform. Instead, the UK defined their own budget concept comprising a "Golden rule" and "Sustainable investment rule", effectively running throughout 1998–2008, which was UK's national interpretation how the SGP-regulation text should be understood.

- The so-called Golden rule would only be met, if the Current Budget (the "nominal budget balance of the general government" before expenses used for "public net investment") expressed as a ratio to GDP, is calculated in average to be in balance or surplus (equal to minimum 0.0%) over the period starting in the first year of the economic cycle and ending with the last year of the economic cycle. In this way, it could not definitively be determined whether the Golden rule had been met before an entire economic cycle had been completed. Along the way, there were no year-specific target set for the Cyclically-Adjusted Current Budget (CACB) balance, which was allowed to fluctuate throughout the cycle – although only to the extent of ensuring the Golden rule would be met at the latest by the end of the cycle. For comparison towards the commission's structural balance calculation scheme, the UK's CACB balance was found in average to be 1–2% higher than the structural budget balance figure for all medium-term periods reported since 1998, simply because the CACB is equal to: "Structural budget balance" + "Public sector net investment" (between 1–2% when averaged over five years) + "reversed adjustment for one-off revenues/expenditures" (close to 0% when averaged over five years).
- The so-called sustainable investment rule (also applying for 1998–2008), demanded that "Public sector net debt as a proportion of GDP" should be held over the economic cycle at a stable level beneath a 40%-limit. With this target being set in "net debt", it differed from the SGP's 60%-target which was related to "gross debt".
- When it was evident the UK business cycle stretching from 1997 to 2006 had ended, the UK government found that both its "Golden rule" and "Sustainable Investment rule" had been attained across this specific cycle. Starting from 2008 to 2009 and forward throughout the current business cycle, the two previous rules were replaced by a "temporary operating rule", because of the current cycle being forecast not to be normal (featuring a prolonged recovery phase compared to a normal cycle). The "temporary operating rule" now target: "to allow for a sharp CACB deterioration in the short-term (by applying active loosening fiscal policy in addition to the automatic stabilizers throughout 2008–09 and 2009–10), and then once the economy has emerged from the downturn, to set policies to improve the CACB each year going forward, so that it reaches balance and net debt start to decrease in the medium-term".
- As no MTO was nationally selected by the UK in "structural balance terms" – throughout the entire period covered by the table, the compliance colors for the UK indicate whether or not its structural balance each year respected its "Minimum MTO" as calculated in structural balance terms by the commission.

Country- specific MTOs (structural balance, % of GDP)	2011	2012	2013	2014	2015
Austria	0.0% earliest 2015	-0.45% earliest 2016	-0.45% in 2016	-0.45%	-0.45% earliest 2020
Belgium	+0.5% earliest 2015	+0.5% earliest 2016	+0.75% earliest 2017	+0.75% earliest 2019	+0.75% earliest 2019
Bulgaria	-0.6% in 2014	-0.5% in 2014	-0.5% earliest 2017	-1.0% in 2015	-1.0% earliest 2019
Croatia	Outside EU	Outside EU	N/A; Min.MTO = N/A	N/A ⇔ -1.5% in 2019; Min.MTO = -1.5%	N/A ⇔ 0.0% earliest 2019; Min.MTO = 0.0%
Cyprus	0.0% earliest 2015	0.0% in 2013	0.0% earliest 2017	0.0%	0.0%
Czech Republic	-1.0% earliest 2015	-1.0% in 2015	-1.0%	-1.0%	-1.0% in 2017
Denmark	-0.5%	-0.5%	-0.5%	-0.5%	-0.5%
Estonia	0.0%	0.0% in 2013	0.0% in 2014	0.0%	0.0% in 2016
Finland	+0.5% in 2011	+0.5% earliest 2016	-0.5% earliest 2018	-0.5% in 2015	-0.5% earliest 2020
France	0.0% earliest 2015	0.0% earliest 2016	0.0% earliest 2018	0.0% in 2018	-0.4% earliest 2019
Germany	-0.5% in 2014	-0.5%	-0.5%	-0.5%	-0.5%
Greece	N/A	N/A	N/A	N/A	N/A
Hungary	-1.5% earliest 2015	-1.5%	-1.7%	-1.7% in 2014	-1.7% in 2017
Ireland	-0.5% earliest 2015	-0.5% earliest 2016	0.0% earliest 2018	0.0% earliest 2019	0.0% in 2019
Italy	0.0% in 2014	0.0% in 2013	0.0% in 2014	0.0% in 2016	0.0% in 2018
Latvia	-1.0%	-0.5%	-0.5% earliest 2017	-1.0% in 2018	-1.0% earliest 2019
Lithuania	+0.5% earliest 2015	+0.5% earliest 2016	-1.0% in 2016	-1.0% in 2015	-1.0% in 2016
Luxembourg	+0.5%	+0.5%	+0.5%	+0.5%	+0.5%
Malta	0.0% earliest 2015	0.0% earliest 2016	0.0% earliest 2017	0.0% in 2018	0.0% earliest 2019
Netherlands	-0.5% earliest 2016	-0.5% earliest 2016	-0.5% earliest 2018	-0.5%	-0.5%
Poland	-1.0% earliest 2015	-1.0% in 2015	-1.0% earliest 2017	-1.0% in 2018	-1.0% earliest 2019
Portugal	-0.5% in 2019	-0.5% in 2014	-0.5% in 2017	-0.5% in 2017	-0.5% in 2019
Romania	-2.0% in 2014	-0.7% in 2014	-1.0% in 2016	-1.0%	-1.0% in 2016
Slovakia	0.0% earliest 2015	-0.5% earliest 2016	-0.5% earliest 2017	-0.5% in 2018	-0.5% earliest 2019
Slovenia	0.0% earliest 2015	0.0% earliest 2016	0.0% earliest 2017; Min.MTO = +0.25%	0.0% earliest 2019	0.0% earliest 2020
Spain	0.0% earliest 2015	0.0% earliest 2016	0.0% earliest 2017	0.0% in 2018	0.0% earliest 2019
Sweden	+1.0% in 2011	-1.0%	-1.0%	-1.0% in 2014	-1.0%
United Kingdom (former member)	N/A ⇔ -1.0% earliest 2015–16; CACB=0.0% in 2014–15; Min.MTO = -1.0%	N/A ⇔ -1.0% earliest 2016–17; CACB=0.0% in 2016–17; Min.MTO = -1.0%	N/A ⇔ -1.0% earliest 2018–19; CACB=0.0% in 2016–17; Min.MTO = -1.0%	N/A ⇔ -1.0% in 2018–19; CACB=0.0% in 2017–18; Min.MTO = -1.0%	N/A ⇔ -1.25% in 2017–18; CACB=0.0% in 2017–18; Min.MTO = -1.25%

MTO not reached (as per the latest data calculated by the EC method in May 2015), with note of the forecast year to reach it (as per the concurrent EC forecast made on basis of the national stability programme)
MTO reached (as per the latest data calculated by the EC method in May 2015)

Note about UK: Paragraph 4 of Treaty Protocol No 15, exempts UK from the obligation in Article 126(1+9+11) of the Treaty on the Functioning of the European Union to avoid excessive general government deficits, for as long as the state opts not to adopt the euro. Paragraph 5 of the same protocol however still provides that the "UK shall endeavour to avoid an excessive government deficit". On one hand, this means that the Commission and Council still approach the UK with EDP recommendations whenever excessive deficits are found, but on the other hand, they legally cannot launch any sanctions against the UK if they do not comply with the recommendations. Due to its special exemption, the UK also did not incorporate the additional MTO adjustment rules introduced by the 2005 SGP reform and six-pack reform. Instead, the UK defined their own budget concept, which was operated by a "Golden rule" and "Sustainable investment rule" throughout 1998–2008 (described in detail by the table note further above), and since then by a "temporary operating rule".

- The so-called temporary operating rule commit the government "to allow for a sharp Cyclically-Adjusted Current Budget (CACB) deterioration in the short-term during a severe economic crisis (throughout 2008–09 and 2009–10), by applying active loosening fiscal policy in addition to the automatic stabilizers, and then once the economy has emerged from the downturn, to set policies to improve the CACB each year going forward, so that it reaches balance and net debt start to decrease in the medium-term". In other words, the CACB is targeted only to reach a minimum of 0.0% in the medium term, after having been allowed temporarily to deteriorate throughout the 2008–09 and 2009–10 fiscal years. The CACB figures correspond to the commission's reported structural budget balance figures, except that it does not include the expenditure "Public sector net investment" and refrains from performing any adjustment for one-off revenues/expenditures. For comparison with the SGP's definition of structural budget balance, it shall be noted that the UK has been forecasted to spend on average 1.5% of GDP annually on "Public sector net investment" throughout the seven years from 2013–14 to 2019–20. When this extra expense is subtracted from the CACB balance, it will be equal to the commission's "structural budget balance before adjustment for one-off revenues/expenditures". As of 2015, the CACB surplus target and CACB definition has remained unchanged, but its achievement date has now been postponed from its initial set 2015–16 fiscal year to the 2017–18 fiscal year.
- The UK fiscal debt-ratio target under the "temporary operating rule", also differs from the SGP debt-ratio target, as it measure compliance with the target according to "net debt" rather than "gross debt", and only require a declining trend to start from 2015 to 2016, a target which was slightly postponed in 2015, so that it shall now only decrease starting from 2016 to 2017.
- As no MTO was nationally selected by the UK in "structural balance terms" – throughout the entire period covered by the table, the compliance colors for the UK indicate whether or not its structural balance each year respected its "Minimum MTO" as calculated in structural balance terms by the commission.

== Criticism ==
The Pact has been criticised by some as being insufficiently flexible and needing to be applied over the economic cycle rather than in any one year. The problem is, that countries in the EMU cannot react to economic shocks with a change of their monetary policy since it is coordinated by the ECB and not by national central banks. Consequently, countries must use fiscal policy i.e. government spending to absorb the shock. They fear that by limiting governments' abilities to spend during economic slumps may intensify recessions and hamper growth. In contrast, other critics think that the Pact is too flexible; economist Antonio Martino writes: "The fiscal constraints introduced with the new currency must be criticized not because they are undesirable—in my view they are a necessary component of a liberal order—but because they are ineffective. This is amply evidenced by the "creative accounting" gimmickry used by many countries to achieve the required deficit to GDP ratio of 3 per cent, and by the immediate abandonment of fiscal prudence by some countries as soon as they were included in the euro club. Also, the Stability Pact has been watered down at the request of Germany and France."

The Maastricht criteria has been applied inconsistently: the Council failed to apply sanctions against the first two countries that broke the 3% rule: France and Germany, yet punitive proceedings were started (but fines never applied) when dealing with Portugal (2002) and Greece (2005). In 2002 the European Commission President (1999–2004) Romano Prodi described it as "stupid", but was still required by the Treaty to seek to apply its provisions.

The Pact has proved to be unenforceable against big countries that dominate the EU economically, such as France and Germany, which were its strongest promoters when it was created. These countries have run "excessive" deficits under the Pact definition for some years. The reasons that larger countries have not been punished include their influence and large number of votes on the council, which must approve sanctions; their greater resistance to "naming and shaming" tactics, since their electorates tend to be less concerned by their perceptions in the European Union; their weaker commitment to the euro compared to smaller states; and the greater role of government spending in their larger and more enclosed economies. The Pact was further weakened in 2005 to waive France's and Germany's violations.

== See also ==
- Convergence criteria for joining the Eurozone
- Fiscal union
- Euro Plus Pact
- Sixpack (EU)
- List of acronyms associated with the eurozone crisis

== Bibliography ==
- Matthias Belafi und Roman Maruhn (2005): C·A·P-Position: Ein neuer Stabilitätspakt? Bilanz des Gipfelkompromisses, Centrum für angewandte Politikforschung (in German)
- Anne Brunila, Marco Buti & Daniele Franco,: The Stability and Growth Pact, Palgrave, 2001
- Peter Bofinger (2003): »The Stability and Growth Pact neglects the policy mix between fiscal and monetary policy«, in: Intereconomics, Review of European Economic Policy, 1, S. 4–7.
- Daniel Gros (2005): Reforming the Stability Pact, S. 14–17, in: Boonstra, Eijffinger, Gros, Hefeker (2005), Forum: The Stability and Growth Pact in Need of Reform, in: Intereconomics, 40. Jg., Nr. 1, S. 4–21.
- Friedrich Heinemann (2004): Die strategische Klugheit der Dummheit – keine Flexibilisierung des Stabilitätspaktes ohne Entpolitisierung, S. 62–71, in: Hefeker, Heinemann, Zimmermann (2004), Wirtschaftspolitisches Forum: Braucht die EU einen flexibleren Stabilitätspakt?, in: Zeitschrift für Wirtschaftspolitik, 53. Jahrgang, Heft 1, S. 53–80. (in German)
- Kai Hentschelmann (2010): Der Stabilitäts- und Wachstumspakt als Ordnungsrahmen in Krisenzeiten, Europa-Kolleg Hamburg, Institute for European Integration, Discussion Paper Nr. 1/10. (in German)
