= Kyriacos Zygourakis =

Kyriacos Z. Zygouriakis (born November 7, 1952) is a Greek-American chemical and biomedical engineer, currently the A. J. Hartsook Professor at Rice University and, as of 2012, a Fellow of the American Institute of Medical and Biological Engineers. His research interests are extensively on biochar and the nitrogen cycle, cellular and tissue engineering, coal utilization and pollution control reactors.
