= Lucas wedge =

Economic measure in GDP

The Lucas wedge is an economic measure of how much higher the gross domestic product would have been if it grew as fast as it should have. It shows the loss from deadweight caused by poor or inefficient economic policy choices. A Lucas wedge was named after Robert E. Lucas Jr. an American economist who won the 1995 Nobel Memorial Prize in Economic Sciences for his research on rational expectations.

The Lucas wedge is not the same as the Okun's Law. Okun's Law measures the difference over a period of time between the actual GDP and the GDP that would have been realized at full employment. Over time the Lucas wedge compounds and increases and is thus usually larger than the gap identified by Okun's Law, which suggests that economic policy should focus on optimizing investment in addition to realizing full employment.

The Lucas wedge is sometimes expressed in per capita terms to reflect how much better a person's standard of living would be in the absence of this gap.
