= Okun's law =

Economic relationship between unemployment and production losses

Graph of US quarterly data (not annualized) from 1948 through 2016 estimates a form of the difference version of Okun's law: % change GDP = 3.2 − 1.8 * (change unemployment rate). R^{2} of 0.463. Differences from other results are partly due to the use of quarterly data.

In economics, Okun's law is an empirically observed relationship between unemployment and losses in a country's production. It is named after Arthur Melvin Okun, who first proposed the relationship in 1962. The "gap version" states that for every 1% increase in the unemployment rate, a country's GDP will experience a roughly 2% decrease on its potential GDP. The "difference version" describes the relationship between quarterly changes in unemployment and quarterly changes in real GDP. The stability and usefulness of the law has been disputed.

== Imperfect relationship ==
Okun's law is an empirical relationship. In Okun's original statement of his law, a 2% increase in output corresponds to a 1% decline in the rate of cyclical unemployment; a 0.5% increase in labor force participation; a 0.5% increase in hours worked per employee; and a 1% increase in output per hours worked (labor productivity).

Okun's law states that a one-point increase in the cyclical unemployment rate is associated with two percentage points of negative growth in real GDP. The relationship varies depending on the country and time period under consideration.

The relationship has been tested by regressing GDP or GNP growth on change in the unemployment rate. Martin Prachowny estimated about a 3% decrease in output for every 1% increase in the unemployment rate. However, he argued that the majority of this change in output is actually due to changes in factors other than unemployment, such as capacity utilization and hours worked. Holding these other factors constant reduces the association between unemployment and GDP to around 0.7% for every 1% change in the unemployment rate. The magnitude of the decrease seems to be declining over time in the United States. According to Andrew Abel and Ben Bernanke, estimates based on data from more recent years give about a 2% decrease in output for every 1% increase in unemployment.

There are several reasons why GDP may increase or decrease more rapidly than unemployment decreases or increases:

As unemployment increases,

- a reduction in the multiplier effect created by the circulation of money from employees
- unemployed persons may drop out of the labor force (stop seeking work), after which they are no longer counted in unemployment statistics
- employed workers may work shorter hours
- labor productivity may decrease, perhaps because employers retain more workers than they need

One implication of Okun's law is that an increase in labor productivity or an increase in the size of the labor force can mean that real net output grows without net unemployment rates falling (the phenomenon of "jobless growth")

Okun's Law is sometimes confused with Lucas wedge.

== Mathematical statements ==
The gap version of Okun's law may be written (Abel & Bernanke 2005) as:

$\frac{\overline{Y}-Y}{\overline{Y}} = c(u-\overline{u})$, where

- $Y$ is actual output
- $\overline{Y}$ is potential GDP
- $u$ is actual unemployment rate
- $\overline{u}$ is the natural rate of unemployment
- $c$ is the factor relating changes in unemployment to changes in output

In the United States since 1955 or so, the value of c has typically been around 2 or 3, as explained above.

The gap version of Okun's law, as shown above, is difficult to use in practice because $\overline{Y}$ and $\overline{u}$ can only be estimated, not measured. A more commonly used form of Okun's law, known as the difference or growth rate form of Okun's law, relates changes in output to changes in unemployment:

$\frac{\Delta Y}{Y} = k - c \, \Delta u\,$, where:

- $Y$ and $c$ are as defined above
- $\Delta Y$ is the change in actual output from one year to the next
- $\Delta u$ is the change in actual unemployment from one year to the next
- $k$ is the average annual growth rate of full-employment output

At the present time in the United States, k is about 3% and c is about 2, so the equation may be written

$$\frac{\Delta Y}{Y} = 0.03 - 2 \, \Delta u.\,$$

The graph at the top of this article illustrates the growth rate form of Okun's law, measured quarterly rather than annually.

== Derivation of the growth rate form ==
We start with the first form of Okun's law:

$$\frac{\overline{Y}-Y}{\overline{Y}} = 1-\frac{Y}{\overline{Y}} = c(u-\overline{u})$$
$$\frac{Y}{\overline{Y}}-1 = c(\overline{u}-u).$$

Taking annual differences on both sides, we obtain

$$\Delta\left(\frac{Y}{\overline{Y}}\right) = \frac{Y + \Delta Y}{\overline{Y}+ \Delta \overline{Y}} - \frac{Y}{\overline{Y}} = c(\Delta \overline{u}-\Delta u).$$

Putting both numerators over a common denominator, we obtain

$$\frac{\overline{Y} \, \Delta Y - Y \, \Delta \overline{Y}}{\overline{Y}(\overline{Y} + \Delta \overline{Y})}= c(\Delta \overline{u}-\Delta u).$$

Multiplying the left hand side by $\frac{\overline{Y} + \Delta \overline{Y}}{Y}$, which is approximately equal to 1, we obtain

$$\frac{\overline{Y} \Delta Y - Y \Delta \overline{Y}}{\overline{Y}Y} = \frac{\Delta Y}{Y} - \frac{\Delta \overline{Y}}{\overline{Y}} \approx c(\Delta \overline{u}-\Delta u)$$
$$\frac{\Delta Y}{Y} \approx \frac{\Delta \overline{Y}}{\overline{Y}} + c(\Delta \overline{u}-\Delta u).$$

We assume that $\Delta \overline{u}$, the change in the natural rate of unemployment, is approximately equal to 0. We also assume that $\frac{\Delta \overline{Y}}{\overline{Y}}$, the growth rate of full-employment output, is approximately equal to its average value, $k$. So we finally obtain

$$\frac{\Delta Y}{Y} \approx k - c \, \Delta u.$$

== Usefulness ==
Through comparisons between actual data and theoretical forecasting, Okun's law proves to be an invaluable tool in predicting trends between unemployment and real GDP. However, the accuracy of the data theoretically proved through Okun's law compared to real world numbers proves to be generally inaccurate. This is due to the variances in Okun's coefficient. Many, including the Reserve Bank of Australia, conclude that information proved by Okun's law to be acceptable to a certain degree. Also, some findings have concluded that Okun's law tends to have higher rates of accuracy for short-run predictions, rather than long-run predictions. Forecasters have concluded this to be true due to unforeseen market conditions that may affect Okun's coefficient.

As such, Okun's law is generally acceptable by forecasters as a tool for short-run trend analysis between unemployment and real GDP, rather than being used for long run analysis as well as accurate numerical calculations.

The San Francisco Federal Reserve Bank determined through the use of empirical data from past recessions in the 1970s, 1990s, and 2000s that Okun’s law was a useful theory. All recessions showed two common main trends: a counterclockwise loop for both real-time and revised data. The recoveries of the 1990s and 2000s did have smaller and tighter loops.

== See also ==
- Lucas wedge
