= Diabetes management =

Management of diabetes

Diabetes mellitus is a metabolic disease that is characterized by chronic elevated blood glucose levels (hyperglycemia). Therefore, the main goal of diabetes management is to keep blood glucose levels within normal limits (or a diabetic target range) as often as possible. If diabetes is not well controlled, health challenges may develop. People with diabetes can measure blood glucose by various methods, such as with a glucose meter or a continuous glucose monitor, which monitors over several days. Long-term glucose levels (over 3 months) can also be measured by analysis of a blood sample. In addition to lifestyle modification, some individuals with type 2 diabetes may require medication to adequately control their blood glucose levels. Other goals of diabetes management are prevention or treatment of complications that can result from the disease itself and from its treatment.

== Description ==
Diabetes is a well known chronic disease that affects many individuals of all ages worldwide. There are many subtypes including Type 1, Type 2, gestational diabetes, maturity-onset diabetes of the young (MODY), neonatal diabetes, with Type 1 and Type 2 being the most common. All types of diabetes should be controlled as uncontrolled diabetes can cause many complications. Blood glucose levels that are too low (hypoglycemia) or too high (hyperglycemia) can cause both acute and chronic problems.

Uncontrolled diabetes can harm the inner lining of blood vessels, which affects the ability of blood to deliver nutrients and oxygen to organs throughout the body. By causing damage to blood vessels, diabetes is associated with an increased risk of macrovascular (large blood vessel) conditions such as stroke and heart disease (heart attacks). Diabetes is also associated with microvascular (small blood vessel) complications to organs such as the eyes (diabetic retinopathy) and the kidneys (diabetic nephropathy).

In addition to maintaining adequate blood sugar levels in the body, control of other risk factors that contribute to complications such as smoking, alcohol use, excessive weight, high blood pressure, and high cholesterol are also very important. Often, the recommended treatment for diabetes mellitus is a combination of lifestyle changes such as increasing exercise and healthy eating, along with medications to help control the blood glucose levels in the long term. In addition to management of the diabetes, it is recommended to have routine follow up with a primary care physician or endocrinologist in addition to a variety of specialists who assist in managing possible common complications such as foot ulcers, vision changes, and hearing loss.

=== Glucose Measurement ===
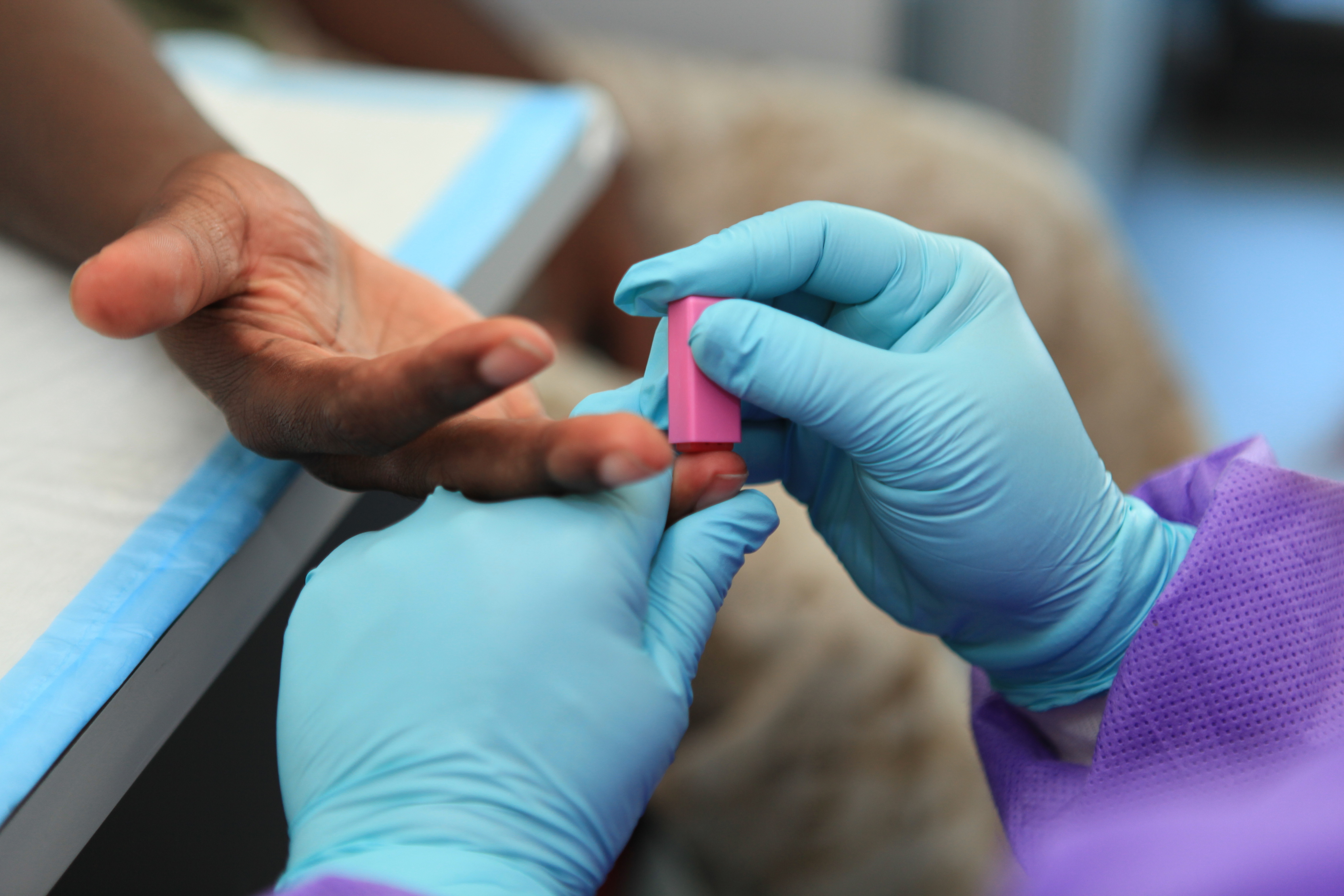
Picture of healthcare worker using lancet to get blood sample from a person

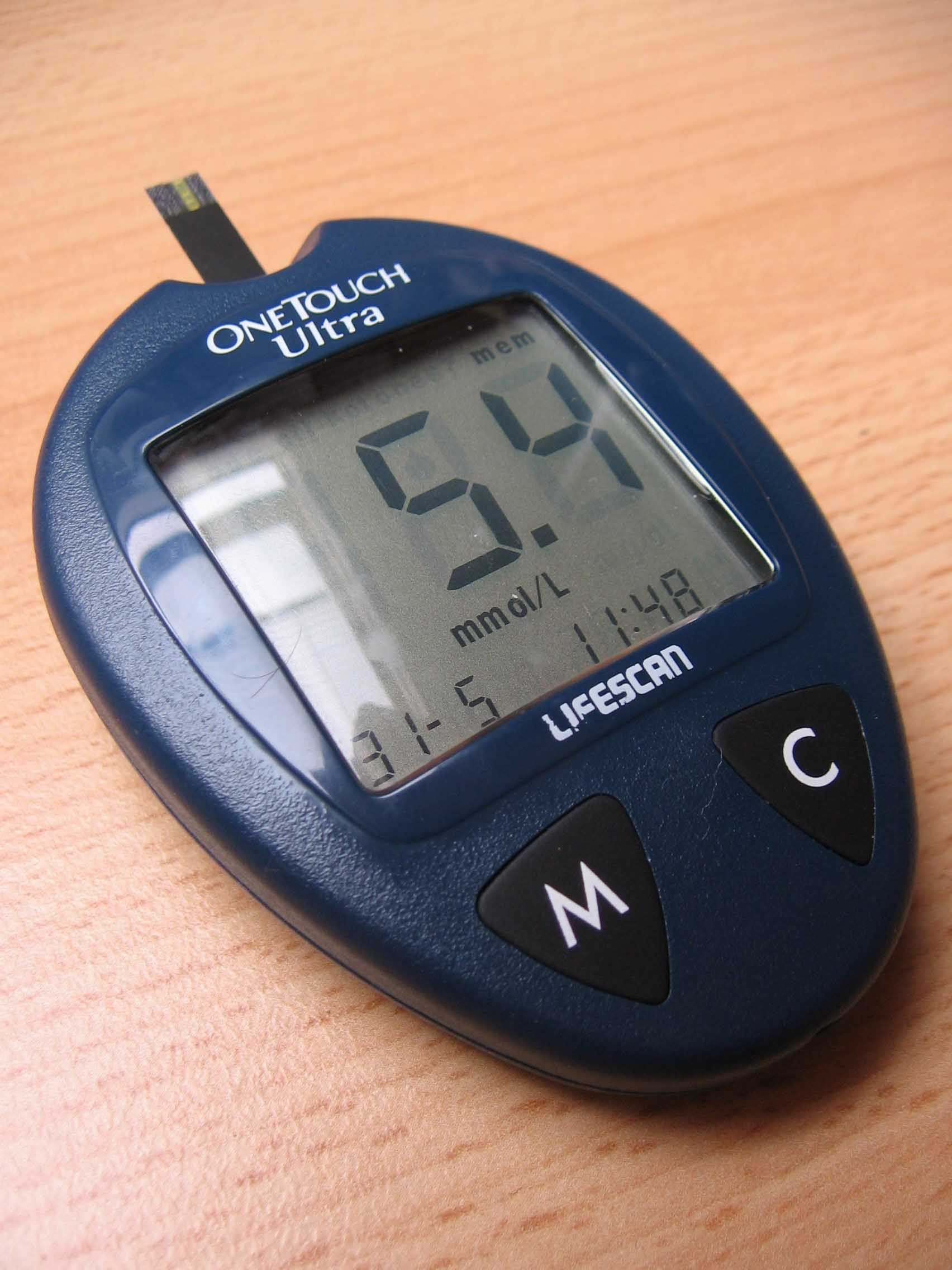
A modern portable meter for blood glucose, displaying a reading of 5.4 mmol/L (98 mg/dL)

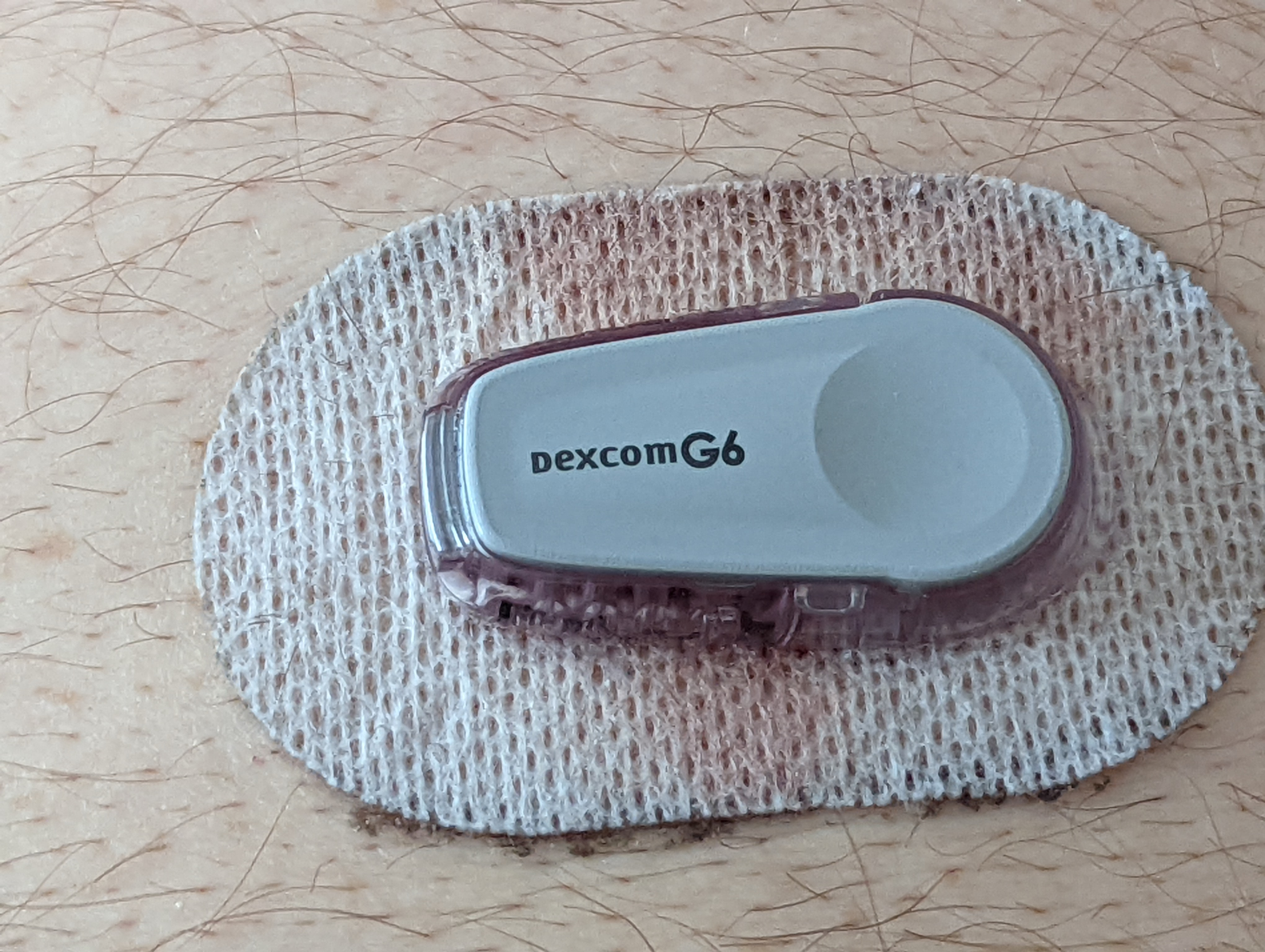
An image of a continuous glucose monitor attached on the skin

There are several methods in which blood sugar is measured including with a glucose meter, continuous glucose monitor (CGM), and routine bloodwork.

The glucose meter, also known as a glucometer, is a common and simple method using a portable electronic device to measure glucose levels either at home or in a clinical setting. The glucose meter works by taking a small sample of blood using a lancet (a sterile pointed needle) to prick a fingertip, usually the index or middle finger (Image 1). The blood droplet is usually collected at the bottom of a test strip, while the other end is inserted in the glucose meter. The drop of blood is drawn into the meter and can directly measure the glucose in the sample. The units of blood sugar level from a glucose meter, will result in either mg/dL (milligrams per deciliter in the US) or mmol/L (millimoles per liter in Canada and Eastern Europe) of blood. Proper user technique and environmental conditions are important in obtaining reliable readings and accurate glucose measurements. Control of diabetes may be improved using home glucose meters to regularly measure glucose levels as this method provides rapid results allowing individuals to make timely decisions regarding diet, exercise, and medication.

Continuous glucose monitors (CGMs) are another method to measure blood glucose levels and is widely used among individuals with diabetes. A continuous glucose monitor is a device that sits on the surface of the skin (usually on the arm or abdomen) and measures the amount of glucose between the cells with a probe. The device does not directly measure the blood sugar but rather tracks the interstitial glucose levels which are similar to blood glucose levels. The other part of the CGM, known as the transmitter, then sends the information to a receiver, an insulin pump, or a compatible smart device. Unlike the traditional glucose meter, CGMs will report the glucose level continuously and has an alarm that will alert the person if the glucose level is too high or low, helping to prevent emergencies. The device is able to graph the glucose readings over the time the sensor was in use and track trends. This allows for timely adjustment of diet, activity levels, medications, and/or illness. In addition, the information from the CGM can be downloaded and sent to a second person (such as a parent, caregiver, or partner) or physician for their review. CGMs have also been shown to improve glycemic control, reduce Hb A1c levels, and/or reduce the risk of hypoglycemic events. They also can reduce the need for multiple fingersticks throughout the day, which may be preferred by some individuals. Popular CGM devices include Dexcom, Freestyle Libre, and Medtronic.

In addition to the above tests, glucose can be measured on routine labs. One common test ordered by healthcare providers is a Basic Metabolic Panel which is a blood test that looks at several different substances in the body, including blood glucose. Usually, individuals are told to fast for 8 hours before drawing the labs so that the provider can see the fasting glucose level. The normal range for fasting blood sugar in people without diabetes is 70 to 99 mg/dL (3.9 to 5.5 mmol/L). The range for individuals considered to have prediabetes is 100 to 125 mg/dL (5.6 to 6.9 mmol/L). If the fasting blood sugar is greater than 126 mg/dL (7.0 mmol/L) on blood tests taken on separate occasions, individuals are considered to have diabetes.

Another useful test that is usually done via a blood test is the measurement of blood HbA1c (hemoglobin A1c) levels. In the blood, there is a molecule called hemoglobin which carries oxygen to the cells. Glucose can attach itself to this molecule and if the blood glucose is consistently high, the value of the A1c will increase. This test, unlike the other tests, is measured as a percentage because the test measures the proportion of all the hemoglobin that has glucose attached. This test measures the average amount of blood sugar control over a period of about 3 months (90 days). In people without diabetes, the HbA1c level ranges from 4.0 to 5.7%. The range for people with prediabetes is 5.7 to 6.4%, and anything above 6.4% is considered diabetic range. Due to the HbA1c serving as an accurate indicator of overall glycemic control, regular 6 month laboratory testing of HbA1c (glycated hemoglobin) is recommended to gauge long-term control and allows for more information to then adjust a person's lifestyle as well as routine medication dosages in such cases.

Optimal management of diabetes involves individuals measuring and recording their own blood glucose levels. By keeping a diary of blood glucose measurements and noting the effect of food and activity levels, individuals can modify their lifestyle to better control their diabetes. Studies suggest that the self-monitoring of blood glucose can improve HbA1c levels both in the short and long-term in patients with type 2 diabetes that are not on insulin. For individuals on insulin, glucose monitoring is also crucial in achieving effective dosing and timing.

=== Glycemic Control ===
Glycemic control is a medical term referring to the typical levels of blood glucose in a person with diabetes mellitus. Much evidence suggests that many of the long-term complications of diabetes, result from many years of hyperglycemia (elevated levels of glucose in the blood).

"Perfect glycemic control" would mean that glucose levels were always normal (70–130 mg/dL or 3.9–7.2 mmol/L) and indistinguishable from a person without diabetes. Good glycemic control, in the sense of a "target" for treatment, has become an important goal of diabetes care. Poor glycemic control refers to persistent (over several months) elevated blood glucose in the 200 to 500 mg/dL (11–28 mmol/L) range. This is also measured by Hb A1c levels, which may range 6.5% or higher.

=== Goals ===
They are suggested in clinical practice guidelines released by various national and international diabetes organizations.

The glycemic targets are:

- Hb_{A1c} of less than 7.0% if they are achievable without significant hypoglycemia
- Preprandial (before eating) blood glucose: 70 to 130 mg/dL (3.9 to 7.2 mmol/L)
- 2-hour postprandial (after eating) blood glucose: Less than 180 mg/dL (<10 mmol/L)

Goals should be individualized based on:

- Duration of diabetes
- Age/life expectancy
- Comorbidity
- Known cardiovascular disease or advanced microvascular disease
- Hypoglycemia awareness

In older people, clinical practice guidelines by the American Geriatrics Society recommend, in frail people who have a life expectancy of less than 5 years, a target a Hb A1c of 8% is appropriate as the risk of very low blood sugar outweighs the long term benefits of a lower A1c.

When comparing the effects of tight versus conventional (more relaxed) glycemic control in type 2 diabetics, studies failed to demonstrate a difference in all-cause cardiovascular death, non-fatal stroke, or limb amputation, but decreased the risk of nonfatal myocardial infarction (heart attack) by 15%. Additionally, tight glucose control decreased the risk of progression of kidney, nerve, and eye complications, but increased the risk of severe hypoglycemia.

== Lifestyle Modification ==
=== Diet ===
Dietary changes have been shown to significantly help people manage diabetes. There are many diets that are effective at managing diabetes however, it is important that patients understand that there is no one diet that all patients should use. Some diets that have strong evidence and have commonly been used successfully in diabetes management and assist with weight loss include Mediterranean diet, Dietary Approaches to Stop Hypertension (DASH), Alternative Healthy Eating Index (AHEI), vegetarian, low carb, or carb-controlled. In addition, it is recommended that individuals choose a diet that can be adhered to long-term. Even in the most ideal diet becomes impractical if the patient has difficulty following it.

While not advocating for a particular diet, the American Diabetes Association does recommend using the "Diabetes Plate Method" as a way to balance food groups. In this method, a 9 inch plate is divided into thirds, with 50% containing non-starchy vegetables, 25% protein, and 25% carbohydrates. Patients should avoid excess simple carbs or added fat (such as butter, salad dressing) and instead eat complex carbohydrates such as whole grains. In addition, patients should also avoid consumption of processed meat and foods and sugar-sweetened beverages. In the long term, it is helpful to eat a consistent diet and amount of carbohydrate to make blood sugar management easier. It is important for patients to eat 3 meals a day in order to reduce the chances of hypoglycemia, especially with patients that take insulin.

There is a lack of evidence of the usefulness of low-carbohydrate dieting for people with type 1 diabetes (T1D). Although for certain individuals it may be feasible to follow a low-carbohydrate regime combined with carefully managed insulin dosing, this is hard to maintain and there are concerns about potential adverse health effects caused by the diet. In general people with T1D are advised to follow an individualized eating plan rather than a pre-decided one.

=== Physical Activity/Exercise ===
Along with diet, physical activity is also important for the management of diabetes. Not only does exercising regularly help manage blood sugar levels and weight, it helps reduce the risk of heart attack and stroke, reduces cholesterol and blood pressure levels, reduces risk of diabetes related complications, increases the effect of insulin, provides a boost in energy levels, helps reduce stress, and contributes to positive self-esteem. By exercising, the body becomes more sensitive to insulin, allowing for better absorption of glucose by the muscle cells, for up to 24 hours after exercise. In addition, studies have shown that physical activity, even below recommended amounts, has the ability to reduce risk of diabetic-related complications.

In people with type 2 diabetes, the combination of aerobic ("cardio") exercise and strength training is effective. Aerobic exercise has been shown to largely improve HbA1c, and contributes to weight loss and the enhanced regulation of cholesterol and lipoproteins. This may be any form of continuous exercise that elevates breathing and heart rate, such as walking, swimming, or dancing. During the last 20 years, resistance training has gained recognition as an effective form of exercise for people with type 2 diabetes. A light walk after a meal (postprandial walking) is also recognized as effective in reducing postprandial glucose spikes in people with or at risk for type 2 diabetes.

In youths with type 1 diabetes, there is an association between exercise and lower HBA1c. Furthermore, studies have shown that the longer the length of the exercise program, the better the reduction in HBA1c and insulin requirements.

=== Weight Loss ===
Image of waist circumference, comparing a normal weight to an overweight and obese individual.

In addition to diet and exercise, weight loss is an important tool to help with diabetes management. Type 2 diabetes (T2D) is often associated with obesity and increased abdominal circumference. Often patients who are at risk of diabetes may be able to reverse their progression to T2D with weight loss as well. Weight loss can help improve metabolic control, reduce the risk of further complications, other health related problems, and helps improve the effects of insulin on the body. Weight loss helps reduce the destruction of the beta cells, which produce insulin in the body, as well.

It is recommended for patients who have been diagnosed with T2D who are overweight or obese to lose at least 5% of their weight and maintain the weight loss. There have been studies that have demonstrated that by losing about 5 to 10% of their weight at diagnosis, there is a reduction in heart disease risk factors, lowered Hb A1c, less diabetes medications, lower cholesterol and improved fitness.

Common strategies to help reduce weight many include lifestyle measures such as diet and exercise, behavioral therapy, pharmacologic interventions, and surgery. The goal of weight loss and method for achievement should be individualized based on the patient's desires and motivation. It is important for providers to help maintain patient motivation and provide education to assist individuals in their weight journey. Additionally, some medications that reduce blood sugars such as insulin may initially cause weight gain due to the increased conversion of blood sugar to stored forms such as fat. Therefore, in patients with diabetes, providers may try other medications that lower blood sugar but not cause as much weight gain.

== Medications ==
There are several medications classes that are commonly used to control blood sugar levels in patients with diabetes. Most of the medications used are either oral or injected. In patients with T1D, insulin is required because the body no longer produces insulin. In patients with T2D, management is largely more variable as lifestyle changes can have a significant impact. However, medications may be added to further help control blood glucose levels if the lifestyle changes are not effectively controlling the condition. Unlike patients with type 1 diabetes, patients with T2D can still produce insulin, so usually oral medications are recommended as first line treatment before requiring insulin for diabetic control. Patient education and adherence with treatment is very important in managing the disease. Improper use of medications and insulin can be very dangerous causing hypo- or hyper-glycemic episodes.

=== Insulin ===
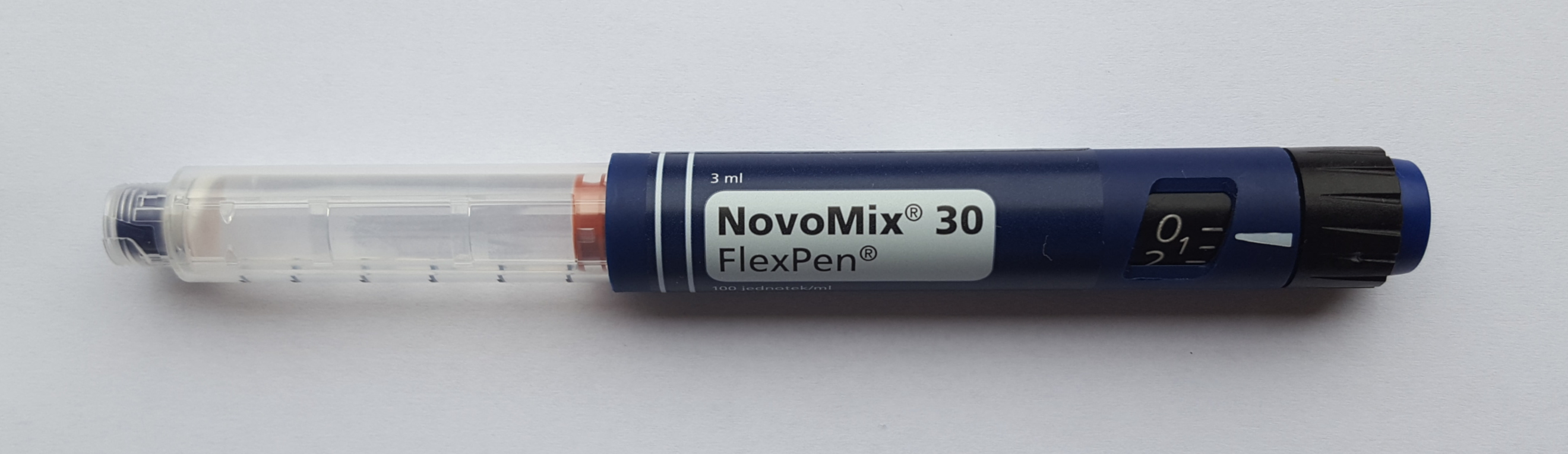
Insulin pen used to administer insulin

Insulin is the hormone that is made by the body that controls the cell intake of glucose. Normally, the pancreas produces insulin in response to high glucose levels in the body to bring the blood glucose levels down. For those with type 1 diabetes, there will always be a need for insulin injections throughout their life, as the pancreatic beta cells are not capable of producing sufficient insulin. Insulin can not be taken orally because insulin is a hormone and is destroyed by the digestive tract. Insulin can be injected by several methods, including a hypodermic needle, jet injector, or insulin pump. There is also inhaled insulin that can be used in adults with diabetes.

There are several types of insulin that are commonly used in medical practice, with varying times of onset and duration of action. These include:

- Rapid acting (i.e. insulin lispro) with onset in 15 minutes and duration of about 4 hrs
- Short acting (i.e. regular insulin) with onset in 30 minutes and duration of about 6 hrs
- Intermediate acting (i.e NPH insulin) with onset in 2 hours and duration of about 14 hrs
- Long acting (i.e. detemir) with onset in 1 hour and duration of about 24 hrs
- Premixed which are usually combinations of short and long acting insulin

Insulin is usually taken several times per day in patients who require it to control their diabetes. Patients usually take long acting insulin once per day and then take insulin before meals. The time of onset of the insulin determines how far in advance patients should take the insulin before they eat.

Insulin therapy requires close monitoring and a great deal of patient education, as improper administration is quite dangerous. Insulin can easily cause hypoglycemia if the patient does not eat after administering insulin or accidentally took too much insulin. A previously satisfactory dosing may be too much if less food is consumed causing hypoglycemia. Exercise decreases insulin requirements as exercise increases glucose uptake by body cells whose glucose is controlled by the insulin.

Insulin therapy creates risk because of the inability to continuously know a person's blood glucose level and adjust insulin infusion appropriately. However, new advances in technology have significantly alleviated many of these risks, although they can still occur. Small, portable insulin infusion pumps are available from several manufacturers. They allow a continuous infusion of small amounts of insulin to be delivered through the skin around the clock. They also have the ability to give bolus doses when a person eats or has elevated blood glucose levels. They are also capable to being used in conjunction with continuous glucose monitors for optimal glucose management. This is very similar to how the pancreas works, but these pumps lack a continuous "feed-back" mechanism. Thus, the user is still at risk of giving too much or too little insulin unless blood glucose measurements are made.

=== Oral Medications ===
==== Metformin ====
One of the most common drugs used in T2D, metformin is the drug of choice to help patients lower their blood sugar levels. Metformin is an example of a class of medicine called biguanides. The medication works by reducing the new creation of glucose from the liver and by reducing absorption of sugar from food. In addition, the medication also works to help increase the effects of insulin on muscle cells, which take in glucose. The medicine is not used for T1D as these patients do not produce any insulin and metformin relies on some insulin production in order to be effective. There are several preparations of the medication such as tablets, extend release tablets, and liquid suspensions. Metformin is usually started as 500 to 1000 mg tablets twice a day by mouth (PO), usually with meals. If taking the extended release tablets, they should be always swallowed whole as cutting the tablet will cause faster release of the medication. The medication most commonly may cause side effects such as stomach upset and diarrhea, but in general is well tolerated and has a relatively low chance of causing hypoglycemia. One rare (about 1% chance) but serious side effect of metformin is that it can cause lactic acidosis, usually in patients with poor kidney function. To assist in tolerance of the metformin, practitioners may recommend gradual increase of the dose of the medication.

==== Sulfonylureas ====
Another commonly used class of medications to treat T2D are sulfonylureas. This class of medicine increases the release of insulin from the beta cells in the pancreas. The medication can not be used in patients with T1D, as they do not have functioning beta cells and can not produce insulin. Some common examples of a sulfonylurea is glipizide, glyburide, glimepiride and gliclazide. Depending on the medication, there are different size tablets but in general, the sizes range from about 1 mg to 10 mg. Usually, the tablet is taken about 30 minutes before a meal and can be either once or twice a day. The most common adverse effects of the medication are lightheadedness and stomach irritation. Sulfonylureas have a greater risk of hypoglycemia but the risk is still only around 3% of patients who use them. In patients who have a greater risk of low sugar, such as in the elderly and patients with kidney disease, the starting dose can be as low as 0.5 mg.

=== GLP-1 agonists ===
Another popular medication that is used in T2D management are glucagon like peptide 1 (GLP-1) agonists. This class of medication works by mimicking a hormone called glucagon-like peptide which has many effects in the body. One effect of the hormone is that it helps time the release of insulin when patients eat and the blood glucose rises. In addition, it can significantly increase the amount of insulin release. Lastly, the medication also slows down the movement of food through the digestive tract and can increase feeling of fullness while eating, decreasing appetite and weight. These drugs are very effective at controlling T2D and reducing risk of heart attacks, strokes, and other complications due to diabetes. In addition, patients usually lose weight and have improved blood pressure and cholesterol. Common names of these medications include semaglutide (Ozempic and Wegovy), liraglutide (Victoza, Saxenda), and dulaglutide (Trulicity). These medications must be injected and are usually injected in the upper arm, thighs or stomach areas. They are usually given once a week but some of the medication can be as frequent as twice daily. The dose is usually started low and tapered gradually. Some of the common side effects of the medication is nausea, vomiting, and diarrhea. Patients with a family history of medullary thyroid cancer or Multiple Endocrine Neoplasia type 2 should not be prescribed the drug as it may increase the risk of developing cancer.

== Surgery ==
While weight loss is beneficial in improving glycemic control in patients with T2D, maintaining significant weight loss can be challenging. People with diabetes who have a body mass index (BMI) of 35 or higher, and who have been unable to lose weight otherwise, bariatric surgery offers a viable option to help achieve that goal. In 2018, a Patient-Centered Outcomes Research Institute funded study was published which analyzed the effects of three common types of bariatric surgery on sustained weight loss and long-lasting glycemic control in patients with T2D. The results of this study demonstrated that five years after bariatric surgery, there was significant weight loss in a large majority of patients. In addition, and more importantly, this study showed that, in patients with type 2 diabetes with a BMI of 35 or higher, bariatric surgery has the potential to lead to complete remission of diabetes in as many as 40% of those people who have the procedure. Like any operation, bariatric surgery is not without risks and complications, and those risks need to weighed against the potential benefits in anyone considering the procedure.

== Additional Monitoring ==
=== Foot Care ===
Foot monitoring can help in predicting the likelihood of developing diabetic foot ulcers, a common complication in persistent uncontrolled diabetes. A common method for this is using a special thermometer to look for spots on the foot that have higher temperature which indicate the possibility of an ulcer developing. At the same time there is no strong scientific evidence supporting the effectiveness of at-home foot temperature monitoring. The current guideline in the United Kingdom recommends collecting 8-10 pieces of information for predicting the development of foot ulcers. A simpler method proposed by researchers provides a more detailed risk score based on three pieces of information (insensitivity, foot pulse, previous history of ulcers or amputation). This method is not meant to replace individuals regularly checking their own feet but complement it.

=== Dental Care ===
High blood glucose levels in individuals with diabetes is a risk factor for developing gum and tooth problems. For patients with diabetes, there are increased risk of developing oral health problems such as tooth decay, saliva production dysfunction, fungal infections, and periodontal disease Diabetes lowers the ability to resist infection and also slows healing and therefore individuals may experience more severe periodontitis. In turn, the chronic infection from periodontal disease can cause difficulties in controlling diabetes, leading to worsening of diabetic complications. The oral problems in persons with diabetes can be prevented with a good control of the blood sugar levels, regular check-ups with their dental provider, and good oral hygiene. Looking for early signs of gum disease (redness, swelling, bleeding gums) and informing the dentist about them is also helpful in preventing further complications. Quitting smoking is recommended to avoid serious diabetes complications and oral diseases. By maintaining a good oral status, diabetic persons prevent losing their teeth as a result of various periodontal conditions.

=== Eye Care ===
Any individual with diabetes is at risk for diabetes-related eye conditions and it is recommended to have an initial diabetic eye exam screening and subsequent annual comprehensive dilated eye exam with either an optometrist or ophthalmologist. Diabetic retinopathy is the most common complication of diabetes and one of the leading causes of blindness worldwide. Individuals with diabetes are at greater risk for developing eye conditions such as glaucoma and cataracts earlier or more frequently. Blood sugar control continues to be the most effective way to decrease the risk or slow the progression of diabetic retinopathy.

=== Digital Tools ===
Audio-based interventions, primarily telephone consultations, have shown promise as supplements to usual diabetes care. A 2025 systematic review found moderate certainty evidence for modest improvements in glycemic control (A1c reduction of 0.20%), with greater effectiveness when interventions included at least monthly contact and remote monitoring tools.

==== Electronic Health Records ====
Sharing their electronic health records with people who have T2D helps them to reduce their blood sugar levels. It is a way of helping people understand their own health condition and involving them actively in its management.

==== m-health Monitoring Applications ====
The widespread use of smartphones has turned mobile applications (apps) into a popular means of the usage of all forms of software. The number of health-related apps accessible in the App Store and Google Play is approximately 100,000, and among these apps, the ones related to diabetes are the highest in number. Conducting regular self-management tasks such as medication and insulin intake, blood sugar checkup, diet observance, and physical exercise are demanding. This is why the use of diabetes-related apps for the purposes of recording diet and medication intake or blood glucose level may improve the health condition for diabetic people.

== Complexities ==
Daily glucose and insulin cycle

The main complexities stem from the nature of the feedback loop of glucose in the blood stream.

- The glucose cycle is a system which is affected by two factors: entry of glucose into the bloodstream and also blood levels of insulin to control its transport out of the bloodstream
- As a system, it is sensitive to diet and exercise
- It is affected by the need for patient anticipation due to the complicating effects of time delays between any activity and the respective impact on the glucose
- Management is highly intrusive, and compliance is an issue, since it relies upon user lifestyle change and often upon regular sampling and measuring of blood glucose levels, multiple times a day in many cases
- It changes as people grow and develop
- It is highly individual

As diabetes is a prime risk factor for cardiovascular disease, controlling other risk factors which may give rise to secondary conditions, as well as the diabetes itself, is one of the facets of diabetes management. Checking cholesterol, LDL, HDL and triglyceride levels may indicate hyperlipoproteinemia, which may warrant treatment with hypolipidemic drugs. Checking the blood pressure and keeping it within strict limits (using diet and antihypertensive treatment) protects against the retinal, renal and cardiovascular complications of diabetes. Regular follow-up by a podiatrist or other foot health specialists is encouraged to prevent the development of diabetic foot. Annual eye exams are suggested to monitor for progression of diabetic retinopathy.

=== Hypoglycemia ===
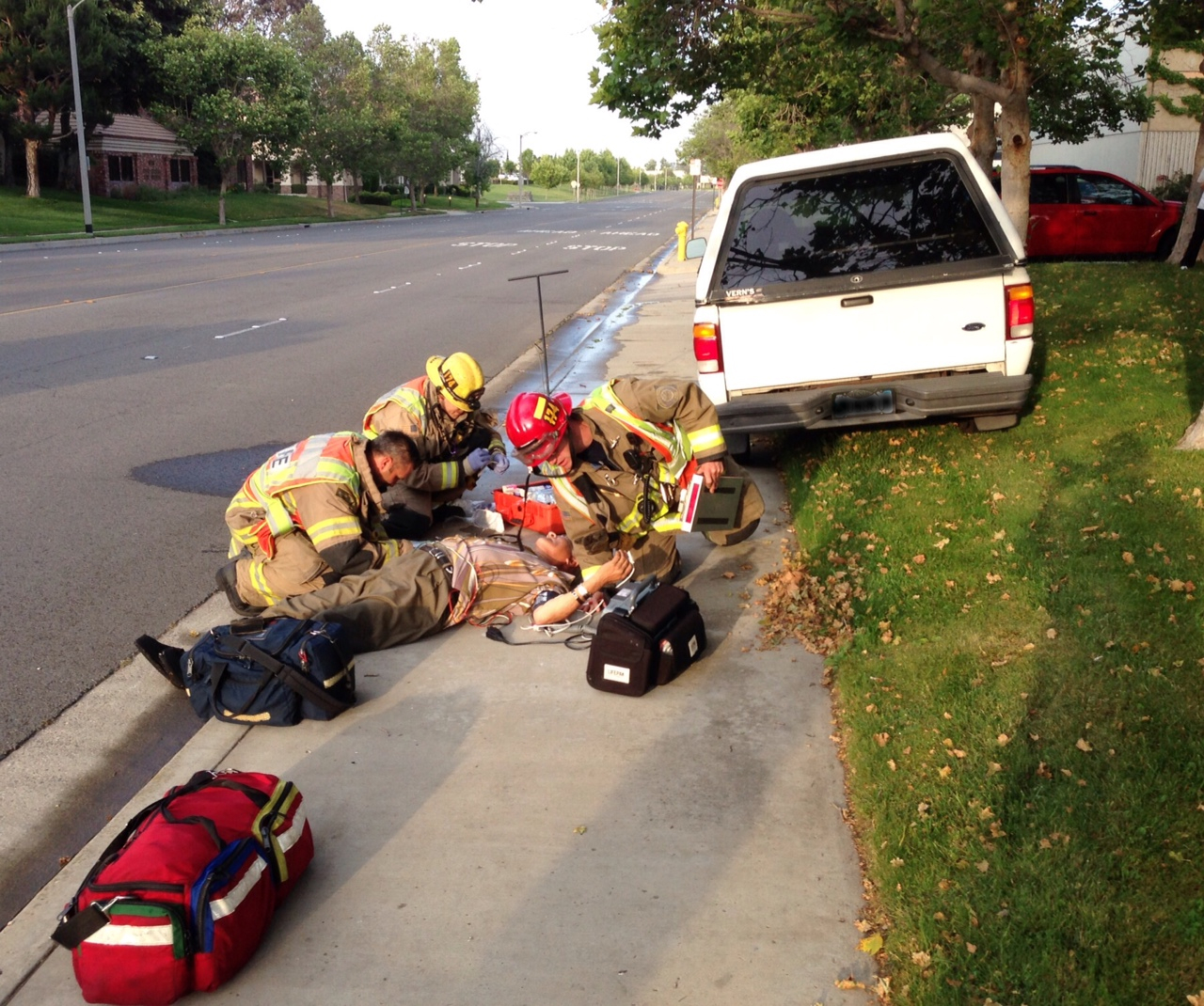
Paramedics attend a diabetic man who lost control of his vehicle due to low blood sugar (hypoglycemia)

A level of <70 mg/dL (<3.8 mmol/L) is described as a hypoglycemic attack (low blood sugar). Most diabetics know when they are hypoglycemic and seek food or a sweet drink to raise their glucose levels. Intensive efforts to achieve blood sugar levels close to normal have been shown to triple the risk of the most severe form of hypoglycemia, in which the person requires assistance from by-standers in order to treat the episode. Among intensively controlled type 1 diabetics, 55% of episodes of severe hypoglycemia occur during sleep, and 6% of all deaths in diabetics under the age of 40 are from hypoglycemia at night.

Hypoglycemia can be problematic if it occurs while driving as it can affect a person's thinking process, coordination, and state of consciousness. Some people are more prone to hypoglycemia as they have reported fewer warning symptoms, and their body released less epinephrine (a hormone that helps raise blood glucose). Additionally, individuals with a history of hypoglycemia-related driving mishaps appear to use sugar at a faster rate.

Drivers with diabetes susceptible to driving mishaps should monitor their blood sugar to be not less than 70 mg/dL (3.9 mmol/L). Instead, these drivers are advised to treat hypoglycemia and delay driving until their blood glucose is above 90 mg/dL (5 mmol/L).

=== Hyperglycemia ===
A patient is considered to have hyperglycemia (high glucose) if the patient has a sugar level of greater than 230–270 mg/dL (13–15 mmol/L). Sometimes the patient may be temporarily hyperglycemic under certain conditions (e.g. not eating regularly, or after strenuous exercise). Patients should closely monitor their sugar levels to ensure that they reduce rather than continue to remain high. High blood sugar levels are not as easy to detect as hypoglycemia and usually happens over a period of days rather than hours or minutes. If left untreated, this can result in diabetic coma and death.

Prolonged and elevated levels of glucose in the blood, which is left unchecked and untreated, will, over time, result in serious diabetic complications in those susceptible and sometimes even death. There is currently no way of testing for susceptibility to complications. Diabetics are therefore recommended to check their blood sugar levels either daily or every few days. There is also diabetes management software available from blood testing manufacturers which can display results and trends over time.

=== Medication nonadherence ===
Because many patients with diabetes have two or more comorbidities, they often require multiple medications. The prevalence of medication nonadherence is high among patients with chronic conditions, such as diabetes, and nonadherence is associated with public health issues and higher health care costs. One reason for nonadherence is the cost of medications. Being able to detect cost-related nonadherence is important for health care professionals, because this can lead to strategies to assist patients with problems paying for their medications. Some of these strategies are use of generic drugs or therapeutic alternatives, substituting a prescription drug with an over-the-counter medication, and pill-splitting. Interventions to improve adherence can achieve reductions in diabetes morbidity and mortality, as well as significant cost savings to the health care system. Smartphone apps have been found to improve self-management and health outcomes in people with diabetes through functions such as specific reminder alarms, while working with mental health professionals has also been found to help people with diabetes develop the skills to manage their medications and challenges of self-management effectively.

=== Psychological mechanisms and adherence ===
As self-management of diabetes typically involves lifestyle modifications, adherence may pose a significant self-management burden on many individuals. For example, individuals with diabetes may find themselves faced with the need to self-monitor their blood glucose levels, adhere to healthier diets and maintain exercise regimens regularly in order to maintain metabolic control and reduce the risk of developing cardiovascular problems. Barriers to adherence have been associated with key psychological mechanisms: knowledge of self-management, beliefs about the efficacy of treatment and self-efficacy/perceived control. Such mechanisms are inter-related, as one's thoughts (e.g. one's perception of diabetes, or one's appraisal of how helpful self-management is) is likely to relate to one's emotions (e.g. motivation to change), which in turn, affects one's self-efficacy (one's confidence in their ability to engage in a behaviour to achieve a desired outcome).

As diabetes management is affected by an individual's emotional and cognitive state, there has been evidence suggesting the self-management of diabetes is negatively affected by diabetes-related distress and depression. There is growing evidence that there is higher levels of clinical depression in patients with diabetes compared to the non-diabetic population. Depression in individuals with diabetes has been found to be associated with poorer self-management of symptoms. This suggests that it may be important to target mood in treatment. In the case of children and young people, especially if they are socially disadvantaged, research suggests that it is important that healthcare providers listen to and discuss their feelings and life situation to help them engage with diabetes services and self-management.

To this end, treatment programs such as the Cognitive Behavioural Therapy - Adherence and Depression program (CBT-AD) have been developed to target the psychological mechanisms underpinning adherence.

== See also ==
- Ambulatory care sensitive conditions
- Diabetes and exercise
- Diabetic coma
- Diabetic hypoglycemia
- Diabetic Hypoglycemia (journal)
- Glycemic efficacy
- Latent autoimmune diabetes of adults
