= Brian M. Frier =

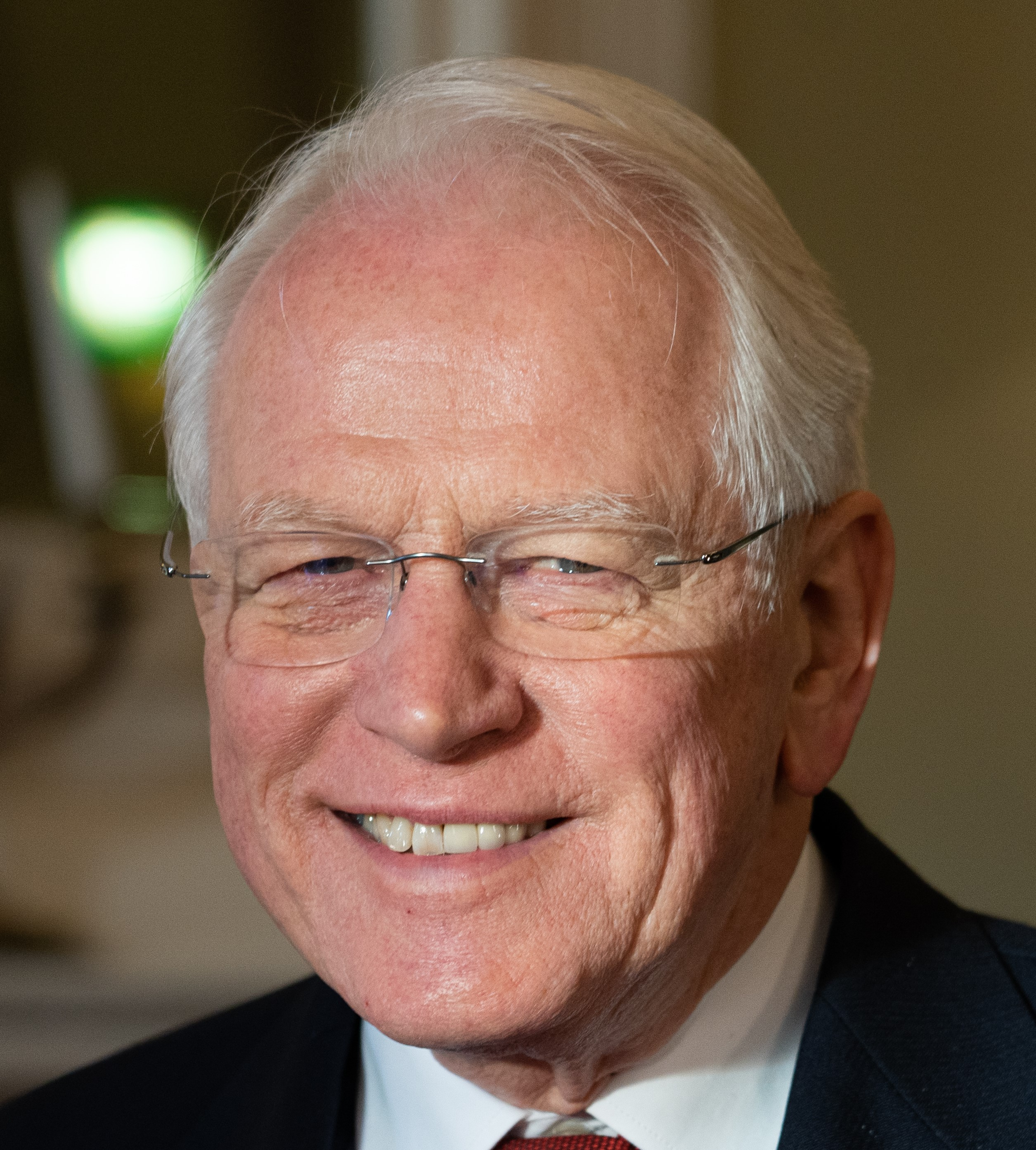
Brian M. Frier

Brian M. Frier is a Scottish physician, diabetologist, clinical scientist, and an Honorary Professor of Diabetes at the University of Edinburgh. He is best known for his many scientific contributions to the pathophysiological understanding of hypoglycemia, a common adverse effect of insulin therapy in diabetic patients whose societal impact has deserved increasing media attention worldwide. His honors include the R.D. Lawrence Lecture of the British Diabetic Association (Diabetes UK) in 1986, the Banting Memorial Lecture at Diabetes UK in 2009, the Camillo Golgi Prize and lecture at the 53rd annual EASD conference in 2017, and the Michael Somogyi Award from the Hungarian Diabetes Association in 2004. Frier is a science book author and editor, and a science journal chief editor. He is also regarded as an authority in the field of driving and diabetes. In 2023, Frier was accorded Honorary Life Membership by the European Association of Diabetes.

== Career ==
Frier graduated B.Sc. (Hons, Class 1) in physiology in 1969 from the University of Edinburgh, and MB.ChB. from the Edinburgh Medical School in 1972, further attaining MRCP (UK) in 1974. He graduated as a Doctor of Medicine (MD) from the University of Edinburgh in 1981. He became a Fellow of the Royal College of Physicians of Edinburgh in 1984, and of Glasgow in 1986. He trained in Edinburgh and Dundee in general (internal) medicine, diabetes and endocrinology. He spent one year (1976–1977) in the US as a research fellow in diabetes and metabolism at Cornell University Medical Center, New York Hospital, working with Christopher D. Saudek in studies of squalene kinetics in cholesterol metabolism in diabetes and hyperlipidemia.

He was appointed a consultant physician in general (internal) medicine with a specialist interest in diabetes, firstly at the Western Infirmary and Gartnavel General Hospital in Glasgow (1982–1987), then at the Royal Infirmary of Edinburgh (1987–2012), working as a full-time clinician in the British National Health Service. He was appointed honorary lecturer in medicine at the University of Glasgow in 1982, and successively became honorary senior lecturer, reader, then honorary professor of diabetes in 2001 at the University of Edinburgh, a post he has held continuously since then. He is listed as a member of the Centre for Cognitive Ageing and Cognitive Epidemiology, University of Edinburgh.

Frier's career has involved clinical care, teaching, research, academic mentoring, and community service, investigating a number of areas of the pathophysiology of diabetes and its complications, with special emphasis on hypoglycemia as an adverse effect of insulin treatment, and its implications on cognition, driving and criminal behavior. He has served as a committee member on driving and diabetes in the UK and Europe.

As a diabetologist, he has lectured and chaired meetings within his specialty in the UK and other countries including Holland, Hungary, Poland, Portugal, Sweden, UAE, and the USA; making contributions in conferences of Diabetes UK, International Diabetes Federation, European Association for the Study of Diabetes, American Diabetes Association, and American Association of Clinical Endocrinologists. He has been a visiting professor at academic centres in the US, Canada and Australia.

Frier has published well over 400 scientific papers in indexed sources, including original research, subject reviews, and book chapters. His work has been cited over 16,000 times, according to Scopus, nearly 20,000 according to Researchgate. His level of expertise in type 1 diabetes was ranked as top 0.17% in 2021.

== Selected publications ==
=== Editorial ===
Frier is the Chief editor of Diabetic Hypoglycemia (journal). He is a member of the editorial board of the journals Clinical Diabetes and Endocrinology (since 2014), Diabetes Science and Technology (since 2018), and Diabetes/Metabolism Research and Reviews (since 2009). He is a Member of the International Advisory Committee to Avances en Diabetologia, the journal of the Spanish Diabetes Society (2008–2012).

=== Books ===
- Hypoglycaemia and diabetes : clinical and physiological aspects. Brian M. Frier, B. Miles Fisher. London: Arnold. 1993. ISBN 978-0-340-55421-0. OCLC 29313131.
- Hypoglycaemia in clinical diabetes. Brian M. Frier, B. Miles Fisher. Chichester, West Sussex, England: John Wiley. 1999. ISBN 0-471-98264-4. OCLC 41256246.
- Strachan, Mark W. J. (2013). Insulin therapy : a pocket guide. Brian M. Frier. London: Springer. ISBN 978-1-4471-4760-2. OCLC 828860433.
- Hypoglycaemia in clinical diabetes. Brian M. Frier, Simon R. Heller, Rory J. McCrimmon. Chichester, West Sussex, UK. 2014. ISBN 978-1-118-69590-6. OCLC 861790289.

=== Research papers ===
- Gold, A. E.; MacLeod, K. M.; Frier, B. M. (1994). "Frequency of severe hypoglycemia in patients with type I diabetes with impaired awareness of hypoglycemia". Diabetes Care. 17 (7): 697–703. doi:10.2337/diacare.17.7.697. ISSN 0149-5992. PMID 7924780. S2CID 5801721.
- Leese, Graham P.; Wang, Jixian; Broomhall, Janice; Kelly, Paul; Marsden, Andrew; Morrison, William; Frier, Brian M.; Morris, Andrew D.; DARTS/MEMO Collaboration (2003). "Frequency of severe hypoglycemia requiring emergency treatment in type 1 and type 2 diabetes: a population-based study of health service resource use". Diabetes Care. 26 (4): 1176–1180. doi:10.2337/diacare.26.4.1176. ISSN 0149-5992. PMID 12663593.
- Williamson, Rachel M.; Price, Jackie F.; Glancy, Stephen; Perry, Elisa; Nee, Lisa D.; Hayes, Peter C.; Frier, Brian M.; Van Look, Liesbeth A. F.; Johnston, Geoffrey I.; Reynolds, Rebecca M.; Strachan, Mark W. J. (2011). "Prevalence of and risk factors for hepatic steatosis and nonalcoholic Fatty liver disease in people with type 2 diabetes: the Edinburgh Type 2 Diabetes Study". Diabetes Care. 34 (5): 1139–1144. doi:10.2337/dc10-2229. ISSN 1935-5548. PMC 3114489. PMID 21478462.

=== Reviews ===
- McCrimmon, Rory J.; Ryan, Christopher M.; Frier, Brian M. (16 June 2012). "Diabetes and cognitive dysfunction". Lancet. 379 (9833): 2291–2299. doi:10.1016/S0140-6736(12)60360-2. ISSN 1474-547X. PMID 22683129. S2CID 1938749.
- Strachan, M. W.; Deary, I. J.; Ewing, F. M.; Frier, B. M. (1997). "Is type II diabetes associated with an increased risk of cognitive dysfunction? A critical review of published studies". Diabetes Care. 20 (3): 438–445. doi:10.2337/diacare.20.3.438. ISSN 0149-5992. PMID 9051402. S2CID 9723940.
- Zammitt, Nicola N.; Frier, Brian M. (2005). "Hypoglycemia in type 2 diabetes: pathophysiology, frequency, and effects of different treatment modalities". Diabetes Care. 28 (12): 2948–2961. doi:10.2337/diacare.28.12.2948. ISSN 0149-5992. PMID 16306561.

== Membership ==
Frier is a member of the European Association for the Study of Diabetes, the American Diabetes Association, the Association of Physicians of Great Britain & Ireland, Diabetes UK, and the Association of British Clinical Diabetologists. He has served on the council and several committees of the Royal College of Physicians of Edinburgh and was its vice-president from 2008 to 2012.

== Awards ==
- R.D. Lawrence Lecture at Diabetes UK in 1986
- Michael Somogyi Award from the Hungarian Diabetes Association in 2004
- Banting Memorial Lecture at Diabetes UK in 2009
- Camillo Golgi Prize 2017, for outstanding contributions in the field of the histopathology, pathogenesis, prevention and treatment of the complications of diabetes mellitus

== Service ==
- Member and chairman, Honorary Advisory Panel on Driving and Diabetes to Secretary of State for Transport, UK Parliament
- External Consultant to the European Working Group “Diabetes and driving” (2004–2005)
- Scotland Diabetes Research Group
