= Somogy =

Somogy may refer to:

- Somogy County, an administrative county (comitatus or megye) in present Hungary
- Somogy County (former), historic administrative county (comitatus) of the Kingdom of Hungary

== See also ==
- Somogy-Csurgó
- Somogyi
