= Shot (rapper) =

Russian rapper (1989–2017)

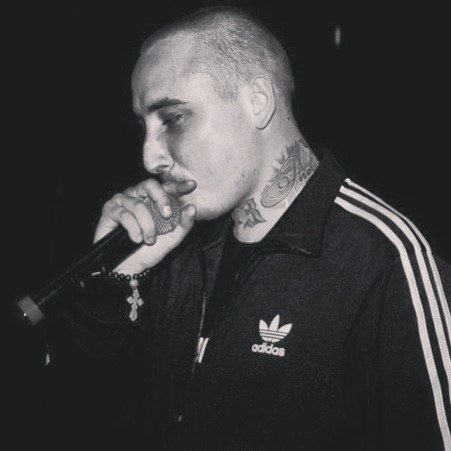

Background information
- Also known as: First Shot
- Born: Евгений Юрьевич Ильницкий (Evgeny Yurievich Ilnitsky); December 1, 1989; Petropavlovsk, Kazakh SSR, Soviet Union
- Died: September 21, 2017 (aged 27) Kazakhstan
- Genre: Hip-hop
- Occupations: Rapper, poet, songwriter battle rapper
- Years active: 2005–2017
- Website: https://shot-music.ru/index/biografija_shot_39_a/0-16

Evgeny Yurievich Ilnitsky (Russian: Евгений Юрьевич Ильницкий, born December 1, 1989; Kazakh SSR, Kazakhstan, Petropavlovsk — September 21, 2017; Ibid), known professionally as Shot, and previously First Shot was a Kazakh-Russian rapper.

== Biography ==
Evgeny was born on December 1, 1989, and lived until his last days in Kazakhstan, the city of Petropavlovsk.

He was brought up from childhood by his grandparents, the parents of his father, who died when Eugene was not even a year old. It so happened that fate separated Evgeny from his mother and older brother, but they saw and communicated from time to time, maintaining warm relations between each other. From an early age, Evgeny became interested in creativity and wrote his first poems, was interested in different genres in music. At the age of 13, I realized that rap is a suitable accessible way to convey important thoughts to people in my songs. The first track on the topic of drug protest was performed at a school event. I started to work thoroughly in 2005, but only in 2008 it became possible to upload tracks to the Internet. Evgeny was able to reach the hearts of listeners, having gathered a large audience of connoisseurs of soulful songs with meaning. He recorded not only the lyrics to the tracks, but also often created music from and to, starting with the minus, ending with mixing tracks independently, without the help of studios, at home.

The trackography includes about 700 solo and collaborative works, dozens of albums and several music videos.

In addition to his musical career, Evgeny received a secondary education, graduated from college with a degree in communications. But, the main activity on his life path remained music, which occupied almost all of his time. He has repeatedly implemented a tour with concerts in Russia, Ukraine and Belarus. In 2015 Evengy's physical health began to decline.

On September 21, 2017, Ilnitsky died from a diabetic coma at the age of 27.

== Discography ==
- 20 Квадрат - Кропал EP Vol.1 (Fuck Records) (2008)
- 20 Квадрат - Кропал EP Vol.2 (Fuck Records) (2008)
- 20 Квадрат - Реминисценция (2008)
- Мортуарий (Shot & Тихий) - Том I - Шаг в пустоту (2008)
- Shot - Кто, Если Не Мы EP (Fuck Records) (2008)
- Shot - Хроника (2009), (Неизданное)
- Shot - Вне Конкуренции EP (Fuck Rec.) (2009)
- Shot - Underground The Mixtape (2009)
- Shot - Reincarnation The Mixtape (2010)
- Shot - Не Надо Слов (2011)
- T1One & Shot - Час Пик (2011)
- T1One & Shot - Небо Под Ногами (The Mixtape) (2011)
- T1One & Shot - Бесконечность (2011)
- Shot - Лирика (Часть Первая) (2011)
- Shot - Лирика (Часть Вторая) (2011)
- Shot - Лирика (Часть Третья) (2012)
- S.H.O.T. (2012)
- Гоша Матарадзе и Shot-Лучше уважай (2012)
- Shot - Под Номером 13 (2014)
- Shot - The Moon (ЕР) (2014)

Participation in releases

- Низам DRedd - Реабилитация (2015)
- Низам DRedd - Раньше было по другому (2020)

== Literature ==
- Rossiĭskiĭ muzykalʹnyĭ ezhegodnik (in Russian). Intermedia. 1998.
