= Somogyi =

Somogyi is a Hungarian surname. Notable people with the surname include:

- Csaba Somogyi (born 1985), a Hungarian football player
- Erzsi Somogyi (1906–1973), Hungarian actress
- Ervin V. Somogyi (born 1944), pioneer of steel string guitar making
- Ferenc Somogyi (1945–2021), Hungarian Ambassador to the United States
- Jennie Somogyi, American retired ballet dancer, former New York City Ballet principal dancer
- József Somogyi (footballer, born 1968) (born 1968), Hungarian football player
- László Somogyi (1907–1988), Hungarian conductor
- Michael Somogyi (1883–1971), professor of biochemistry at Washington University who discovered the Somogyi effect of insulin overdosage
- Zoltan Somogyi, senior lecturer at the University of Melbourne's Department of Computer and Information Systems
- Nea Somogyi, Costa Rican actress, singer, producer, and dancer of Hungarian descent based in New York City.

== See also ==
- Chronic Somogyi rebound, the Somogyi effect of insulin overdosage
