= Fart walk =

Short walk after eating

A fart walk is a short (5 to 15 minutes), light walk taken within an hour after eating. The practice is intended to aid digestion, relieve gas or bloating, and help regulate blood sugar. The practice gained popularity through social media and has been advocated by health professionals who describe the benefits as aligning with well-known physiological principles. In the medical literature, this practice is referred to as postprandial walking, and is primarily studied for its effects on glycemic control.

== History ==
The concept of post-meal walking has existed in various cultures for centuries, such as the Italian passeggiata or the Chinese advice to "take 100 steps after each meal to live to 99." In India, shatapawali refers to an ancient custom of walking 100 steps after a meal.

The term "fart walk" became a viral phenomenon in mainstream media in early 2025, when Toronto-based cookbook author Mairlyn Smith shared her post-dinner walking routine on TikTok, coining the term "fart walk" due to its effect of relieving flatulence.

== Basis and benefits ==
Light physical activity after meals purportedly stimulates gastrointestinal motility, including peristalsis and the gastrocolic reflex, speeding up gastric emptying and the movement of gas and contents through the digestive system. Peristalsis (wave-like muscle contractions in the gut) may help move trapped gas, reducing bloating.

Proponents claim several benefits from fart-walking, including:

- Alleviating post-eating symptoms such as bloating, gas, and indigestion. Mild exercise after eating may also help accelerate the onset of digestion and reduce symptoms like heartburn.
- Blunting postprandial blood sugar spikes, because working muscles absorb glucose without additional insulin. Meta-analysis indicates that light walking after meals consistently moderates glucose levels better than remaining seated.
- Contributing to cardiovascular health and mental well-being through caloric expenditure, improved circulation, modest blood pressure reduction, improved mood via endorphin release, and lower stress hormones.

== Glycemic control research ==
Fart walking, referred to as "postprandial walking" or "post-meal walking" in medical literature, confers benefits relating to glycemic control.

A 2009 study found that a 20-minute walk taken 15–20 minutes after dinner was more effective in lowering postprandial glucose than walking before dinner in people with type 2 diabetes.

A randomized crossover trial in 2013 found that three 15-minute walks following meals led to significantly improved 24-hour glycemic control in older adults at risk for impaired glucose tolerance compared to a single 45-minute walk in the morning.

A randomized controlled trial in India in 2017 compared walking for 15 minutes after each meal to a single 45-minute walk each morning, finding greater reductions in blood glucose and HbA1c in the post-meal group.

In 2022, a review concluded that short bouts (2–10 minutes) of walking after meals were effective in reducing postprandial glucose spikes, particularly in people with or at risk for type 2 diabetes.

== See also ==
- Postprandial glucose
- Peristalsis
- Diabetes management
