= Diabetic hypoglycemia =

Low blood glucose level occurring in person with diabetes mellitus

- Other names: Insulin reaction, Insulin shock
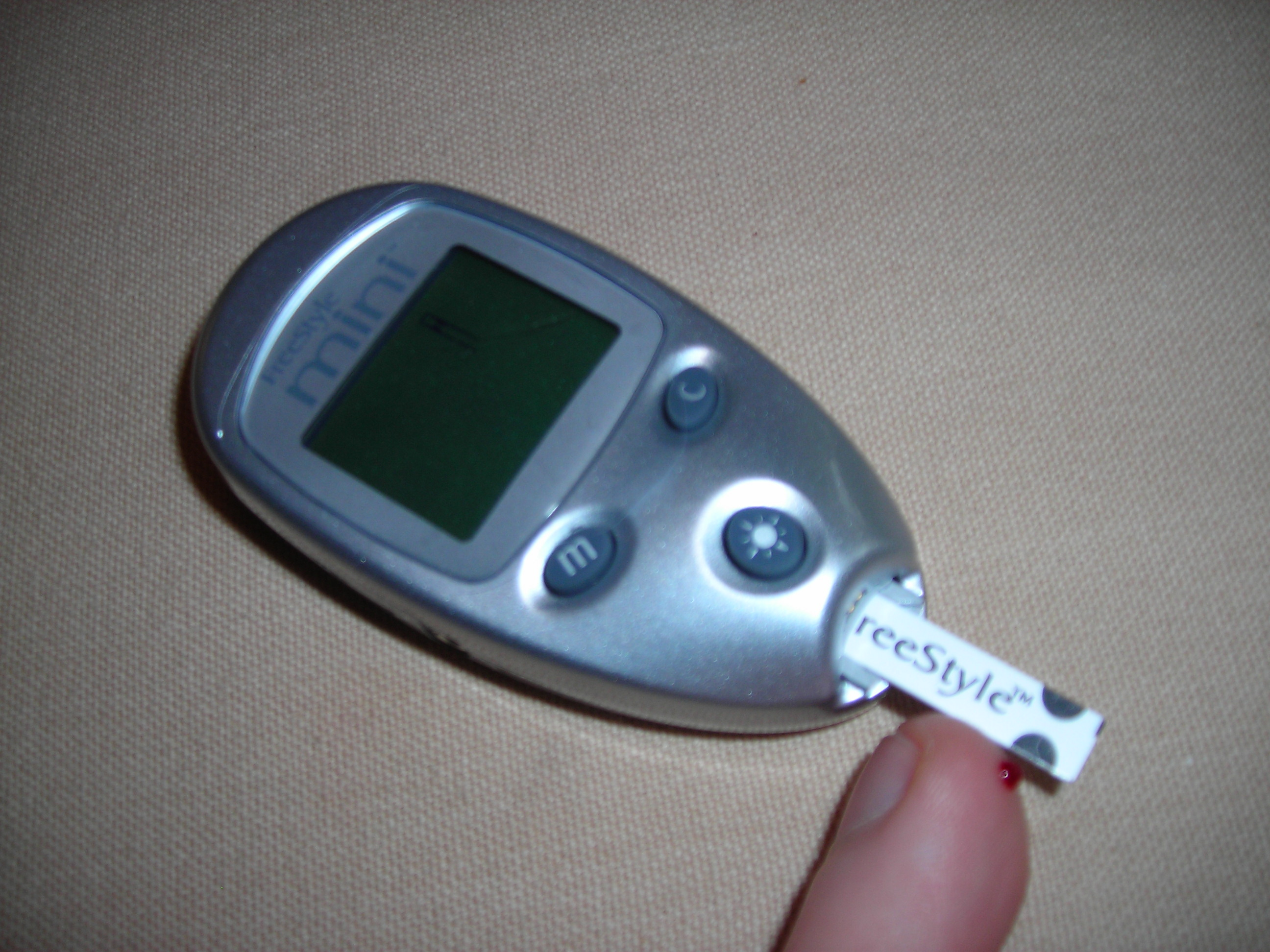
- Specialty: Endocrinology

Diabetic hypoglycemia is a low blood glucose level occurring in a person with diabetes mellitus. It is one of the most common types of hypoglycemia seen in emergency departments and hospitals. According to the National Electronic Injury Surveillance System-All Injury Program (NEISS-AIP), and based on a sample examined between 2004 and 2005, an estimated 55,819 cases (8.0% of total admissions) involved insulin, and severe hypoglycemia is likely the single most common event.

In general, hypoglycemia occurs when a treatment to lower the elevated blood glucose of diabetes inaccurately matches the body's physiological need, and therefore causes the glucose to fall to a below-normal level.

== Signs and symptoms ==
Diabetic hypoglycemia can be mild, recognized easily by the patient, and reversed with a small amount of carbohydrates eaten or drunk, or it may be severe enough to cause unconsciousness requiring intravenous dextrose or an injection of glucagon. Severe hypoglycemic unconsciousness is one form of diabetic coma. A common medical definition of severe hypoglycemia is "hypoglycemia severe enough that the person needs assistance in dealing with it". A co-morbidity is the issue of hypoglycemia unawareness.

Symptoms of diabetic hypoglycemia, when they occur, are those of hypoglycemia: neuroglycopenic, adrenergic (that is, activating adrenergic receptors, resulting e.g. in fast heartbeat), and abdominal. Symptoms and effects can be mild, moderate or severe, depending on how low the glucose falls and a variety of other factors. It is rare but possible for diabetic hypoglycemia to result in brain damage or death. Indeed, an estimated 2–4% of deaths of people with type 1 diabetes mellitus have been attributed to hypoglycemia.

In North America a mild episode of diabetic hypoglycemia is sometimes termed a "low" or an "insulin reaction," and in Europe a "hypo", although all of these terms are occasionally used interchangeably in North America, Europe, Australia and New Zealand. A severe episode is sometimes also referred to as "insulin shock".

In a counter-intuitive manifestation, hypoglycemia can trigger a Somogyi effect, resulting in a rebounding high blood sugar or hyperglycemia.

== Cause ==
Diabetic hypoglycemia can occur in any person with diabetes who takes any medicine to lower their blood glucose, but severe hypoglycemia occurs most often in people with type 1 diabetes who must take insulin for survival. In type 1 diabetes, iatrogenic hypoglycemia is more appropriately viewed as the result of the interplay of insulin excess and compromised glucose counterregulation rather than as absolute or relative insulin excess alone. Hypoglycemia can also be caused by sulfonylureas in people with type 2 diabetes, although it is far less common because glucose counterregulation generally remains intact in people with type 2 diabetes. Severe hypoglycemia rarely, if ever, occurs in people with diabetes treated only with diet, exercise, or insulin sensitizers.

For people with insulin-requiring diabetes, hypoglycemia is one of the recurrent hazards of treatment. It limits the achievability of normal glucoses with current treatment methods. Hypoglycemia is a true medical emergency, which requires prompt recognition and treatment to prevent organ and brain damage.

== Treatment ==
=== Intake of glucose by mouth ===
The blood glucose can usually be raised to normal within minutes with 15–20 grams of carbohydrate, although overtreatment should be avoided if at all possible. It can be taken as food or drink if the person is conscious and able to swallow. This amount of carbohydrate is contained in about 3–4 ounces (100–120 mL) of orange, apple, or grape juice, about 4–5 ounces (120–150 mL) of regular (non-diet) soda, about one slice of bread, about 4 crackers, or about 1 serving of most starchy foods. Starch is quickly digested to glucose, but adding fat or protein retards digestion. Composition of the treatment should be considered, as fruit juice is typically higher in fructose which takes the body longer to metabolize than simple dextrose alone. Following treatment, symptoms should begin to improve within 5 to 10 minutes, although full recovery may take 10–20 minutes. Overtreatment does not speed recovery, and will simply produce hyperglycemia afterwards, which ultimately will need to be corrected. On the other hand, since the excess of insulin over the amount required to normalize blood sugar may continue to reduce blood sugar levels after treatment has produced an initial normalization, continued monitoring is required to determine if further treatment is necessary.

=== Intravenous glucose ===
If a person cannot receive oral glucose gel or tablets, such as the case with unconsciousness, seizures, or altered mental status, then emergency personnel (EMTs/Paramedics and in-hospital personnel) can establish a peripheral or central IV line and administer a solution containing dextrose and saline. These are normally referred to as Dextrose (Concentration) Water, and come in 5%, 10%, 25% and 50%. Dextrose 5% and 10% come in IV bag and syringe form, and are mainly used in infants and to provide a fluid medium for medications. Dextrose 25% and 50% are heavily necrotic due to their hyperosmolarity, and should only be given through a patent IV line – any infiltration can cause massive tissue necrosis. It is MUCH safer to use a Dextrose 10% solution when treating hypoglycemia via IV in children under the age of 14. When using Dextrose 25% in a child it is safer to administer it through a central line or an intra-osseous line.

=== Glucagon ===
Glucagon is a hormone that rapidly counters the metabolic effects of insulin in the liver, causing glycogenolysis and release of glucose into the blood. It can raise the glucose by 30–100 mg/dL within minutes in any form of hypoglycemia caused by insulin excess (including all types of diabetic hypoglycemia). It comes in a glucagon emergency rescue kit which includes tiny vials containing 1 mg, which is a standard adult dose. The glucagon in the vial is a lyophilized pellet, which must be reconstituted with 1 mL of sterile water, included in the "kit". In the widely used Lilly Emergency Kit, the water is contained in a syringe with a large needle for intramuscular injection and must be injected into the vial with the pellet of glucagon before being injected. Glucagon works if given subcutaneously, but absorption and recovery are faster if it is injected deep into a muscle (usually the middle of the outside of the thigh). It has an even more rapid effect when given intravenously but this is rarely practicable. Side effects of glucagon can include nausea and headache, but these can also occur after severe hypoglycemia even when glucagon is not used. Risks of glucagon use are far lower than risks of severe hypoglycemia, and it can usually produce a faster recovery than calling for paramedics and waiting for them to start an intravenous line to give dextrose. If someone uses this kit, they should be seen in an emergency room, as glucagon depletes glycogen stores, and can lead to a deadly rebound hypoglycemia.

In the United States, caregivers for patients with Type 1 diabetes are instructed to have an unexpired glucagon emergency kit on hand at all times.

A number of companies are developing glucagon injection devices with the goal of simplifying administration for caregivers and patients during severe hypoglycemic events. For many, the current standard of care (the glucagon emergency kit) is burdensome and not caregiver or patient-friendly due to the multiple steps required to administer the drug, especially during an emergency situation. To improve hypoglycemia treatment, many companies are developing more efficient glucagon delivery solutions. Xeris Pharmaceuticals, Inc. is developing the Glucagon Rescue Pen or G-Pen using a patented non-aqueous formulation of glucagon that is room-temperature stable, low-volume, and pre-mixed in an auto-injectable device (similar to an EpiPen) that takes the injection process down to two steps (as opposed to nine steps with glucagon emergency kits currently on the market). Similarly, GlucaPen, an autoinjector in development by Enject, Inc. promises to simplify the delivery of glucagon.

== Unawareness ==
Although one expects hypoglycemic episodes to be accompanied by the typical symptoms (e.g., tremor, sweating, palpitations, etc.), this is not always the case. When hypoglycemia occurs in the absence of such symptoms it is called hypoglycemic unawareness. Especially in people with long-standing type 1 diabetes and those who attempt to maintain glucose levels which are closer to normal, hypoglycemic unawareness is common.

In patients with type 1 diabetes mellitus, as plasma glucose levels fall, insulin levels do not decrease – they are simply a passive reflection of the absorption of exogenous insulin. Also, glucagon levels do not increase. Therefore, the first and second defenses against hypoglycemia are already lost in established type 1 diabetes mellitus. Further, the epinephrine response is typically attenuated, i.e., the glycemic threshold for the epinephrine response is shifted to lower plasma glucose concentrations, which can be aggravated by previous incidents of hypoglycemia.

The following factors contribute to hypoglycemic unawareness:

- There may be autonomic neuropathy
- The brain may have become desensitized to hypoglycemia
- The person may be using medicines which mask the hypoglycemic symptoms

=== Autonomic neuropathy ===
During hypoglycemia, the body normally releases epinephrine (more commonly known as adrenaline) and related substances. This serves two purposes: The β-effect of epinephrine is responsible for the palpitations and tremors, giving the patient warning that hypoglycemia is present. The β-effect of epinephrine also stimulates the liver to release glucose (gluconeogenesis and glycogenolysis). In other words, the epinephrine warns the patient that hypoglycemia is present and signals the liver to release glucose to reverse it. In the absence of epinephrine release, or when it is attenuated (reduced) during hypoglycemia, the patient may not be aware that his/her glucose level is low. This is termed 'hypoglycemic unawareness'. The problem is compounded since, in the absence of an appropriate epinephrine response, the usual responses of glycogenolysis and gluconeogenesis may also be lost or blunted.

Since epinephrine release is a function of the autonomic nervous system, the presence of autonomic neuropathy (i.e., a damaged autonomic nervous system) will cause the epinephrine release in response to hypoglycemia to be lost or blunted. Unfortunately, damage to the autonomic nervous system in the form of autonomic neuropathy is a common complication of long-standing diabetes (especially type 1 diabetes), so the presence of hypoglycemic unawareness may be a sign of autonomic neuropathy, although the autonomic response to hypoglycemia is already impaired in patients with type 1 diabetes mellitus even in the absence of autonomic neuropathy.

Because the autonomic response is, in effect, the body's backup system for responding to hypoglycemia, patients with type 1 diabetes are forced to rely almost exclusively on a backup system for protection, which can unfortunately deteriorate over time. The reduced autonomic response (including the sympathetic neural norepinephrine and acetylcholine as well as the adrenomedullary epinephrine response) causes the clinical syndrome of hypoglycemia unawareness — loss of the largely neurogenic warning symptoms of developing hypoglycemia.

=== Brain desensitization to hypoglycemia ===
If a person has frequent episodes of hypoglycemia (even mild ones), the brain becomes "used to" the low glucose and no longer signals for epinephrine to be released during such times. More specifically, there are glucose transporters located in the brain cells (neurons). These transporters increase in number in response to repeated hypoglycemia (this permits the brain to receive a steady supply of glucose even during hypoglycemia). As a result, what was once the hypoglycemic threshold for the brain to signal epinephrine release becomes lower. Epinephrine is not released, if at all, until the blood glucose level has dropped to even lower levels. Clinically, the result is hypoglycemic unawareness.

Since repeated hypoglycemia is common in people with diabetes who strive to keep their glucose levels near normal, the incidence of hypoglycemic unawareness becomes more prevalent in patients who follow 'intensive treatment' protocols.

The most common treatment for this condition is to liberalize the patient's target glucose levels, in an attempt to decrease the frequency of hypoglycemic episodes. Hypoglycemic unawareness will sometimes disappear when the frequency of hypoglycemic episodes has declined, but this is not always the case.

=== Beta blockers ===
These medicines are designed to blunt the β-effect of adrenaline and related substances. Hence, if hypoglycemia occurs in someone who is using this type of drug, he/she may not experience the typical adrenergic warning symptoms such as tremor and palpitations. Again, the result is hypoglycemic unawareness. As noted above, beta blockers will also prevent adrenaline from stimulating the liver to make glucose, and therefore may make the hypoglycemia more severe and/or more protracted. Of all the hypoglycemia symptoms, sweating is typically not blocked by beta blockers.

== See also ==
- Diabetes alert dog
- Diabetic Hypoglycemia (journal)
- Medical response dog
