= Zig Zag (Canadian TV series) =

Canadian children's television series

- Genre: Children's show
- Starring: Terry David Mulligan; Susanne McLellan; Valri Bromfield; Mairlyn Smith; Bill Reiter; Rick Ducommun
- Country of origin: Canada

Original release
- Network: BCTV
- Release: 1979 – 1988

Zig Zag is a Canadian children's television series.

It was produced by BCTV (now Global BC) in Vancouver, British Columbia from 1979-1988. Among the hosts of the series were Terry David Mulligan, Susanne McLellan, Valri Bromfield, Mairlyn Smith, Bill Reiter and Rick Ducommun. Norm Grohmann, Nicola Cavendish and Ryan Stiles also made regular appearances on the show.

One segment of the show was The Biff and Bart Show, which originally started out only as a two-minute "filler" segment, but as the years went by it ultimately took over the whole program.
