= Philip Anderson Shaffer =

American biochemist and medical researcher (1881–1960)

Philip Anderson Shaffer (September 20, 1881 – December 4, 1960) was an American biological chemist and medical researcher best known for establishing the protein nature of insulin, for studies of metabolism in typhoid fever patients, and for his long stewardship at Washington University in St. Louis as a department head and dean.

Shaffer was born in Martinsburg, West Virginia. His father was a storekeeper, his mother a music teacher. Attending Martinsburg High School, he attracted the attention of a teacher who was a recent Harvard graduate. The man, A. B. Carmen, facilitated young Philip's transfer at age 15 to the West Virginia University, where he enrolled as a military cadet. As much as he would have liked to volunteer for the Spanish American War, however, his parents refused to give the necessary permission. After receiving a B.A. in chemistry, he enrolled for graduate study at Harvard, receiving a Ph.D. in biological chemistry in 1904, having also worked as a research chemist at McLean Hospital in Waverley, Massachusetts. At McLean, he attempted to find in urine biomarkers for certain mental disorders.

From 1906 to 1910, Shaffer was an instructor in chemical pathology at Weill Cornell Medicine in New York City. In 1910 he relocated to the Washington University School of Medicine as a professor of biological chemistry and also department head, a position in which he continued for more than thirty five years, interrupted only by service in the Army in World War I as a major (Food Division of the Sanitary Corps). He served twice as dean of the medical school, 1915-1919 and 1937-1946.

Shaffer published broadly on metabolism over the course of his career. An early important contribution was work on the metabolism of typhoid fever patients, which led to his developing in 1909 (with Warren Colman) a therapeutic high-protein, high-calorie diet that met with some success. (Antibiotics for typhoid were not developed until 1948.) Shaffer's early work on the determination of sugar levels in blood led to his continuing interest in diabetes. In 1923-1924 with Edward Adelbert Doisy and Michael Somogyi he established the protein nature of insulin and suggested improvements to the original method of Banting and Best for its extraction, that were soon adopted by the Eli Lilly and Company.

As his administrative duties increased in later years, especially in his second term as dean, his production of original research decreased correspondingly. He was much admired, however, for his ability to perceive talent in very junior researchers.

Shaffer was an elected member of the National Academy of Sciences and the American Philosophical Society, and a fellow in the American Association for the Advancement of Science. He was president of the American Society of Biological Chemists 1923-1924). He became an emeritus professor in 1952 and died in 1960.
