= Glucagon rescue =

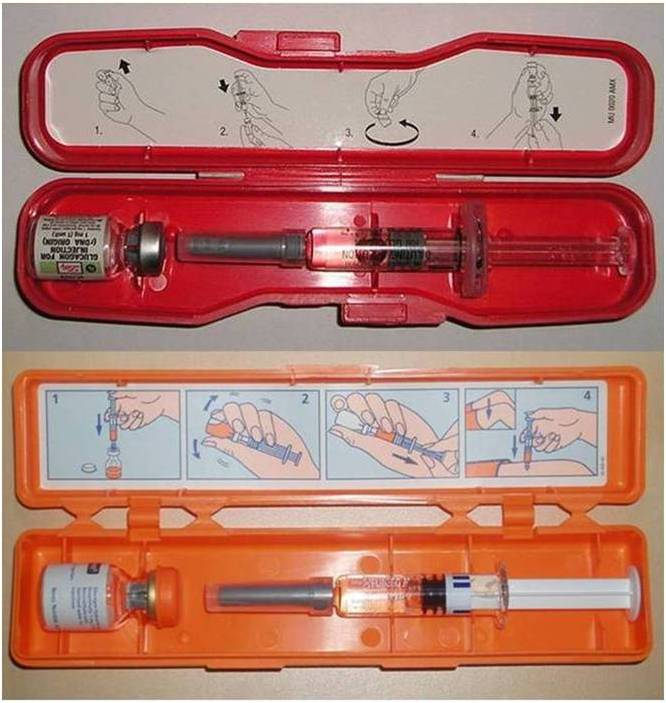
Top: The Glucagon Emergency Rescue Kit, easily identified by its red box, and showing its components and the simple four-step instruction-by-picture label. Bottom: The GlucaGen HypoKit, easily identified by its orange box, and showing its components and the simple four-step instruction-by-picture label. Notice the orange plastic cap on the vial, which needs to be removed.

Glucagon rescue is the emergency injection of glucagon in case of severe diabetic hypoglycemia. It is needed during seizures and/or unconsciousness by an insulin user who is unable at that point to help themselves. Glucagon will facilitate the release of stored glucose back into the bloodstream, raising the blood glucose level.

Rescue has been simplified by the development of the glucagon hypoglycemia rescue kit, consisting of:

- biosynthetic human glucagon, in a freeze dried form within a vial,
- a sturdy syringe, pre-filled with a sterile diluting solution, and
- a conspicuous red or orange colored plastic storage box, which includes instructions.

At the first signs of hypoglycemia, an insulin user should treat it immediately by consuming carbohydrate to restore blood glucose to safe levels (thereby preventing progression to severe hypoglycemia). However, not all insulin users can feel and recognize the early signs, particularly when sleeping. This can quickly lead to an emergency resulting in unconsciousness, inability to swallow, seizures, and in extreme cases death. In the past, treatment consisted of intravenous delivery of dextrose (glucose) usually in a hospital emergency department; however, the delay in treatment due to emergency response and transport to a medical facility is life-threatening.

The glucagon rescue kit facilitates rapid rescue by a simple injection, which does not require medical expertise, and can be done quickly and easily outside of a medical facility.

== Glucagon rescue kits ==
Glucagon rescue kits are manufactured by Novo and Eli Lilly and Company. Novo Nordisk manufactures the GlucaGen HypoKit and Eli Lilly and Company manufactures the Glucagon emergency kit.

== Potential issues with glucagon administration ==
In an emergency, a potential rescuer may unroll these instructions and then decide not to perform the rescue.
Unrolled, the front	Unrolled, the back

Glucagon must be reconstituted using a multi-step process that requires the administrator to use a prepared syringe containing an inactive compound and a sealed dosage bottle of glucagon. After the contents of the syringe are injected into the glucagon bottle, the administrator must determine if the reconstitution appears appropriate: clear with a water-like consistency. This is a subjective assessment. The solution must be drawn back into the syringe, the injection site cleaned with alcohol, and then injected with sufficient force into fatty tissue. Individuals who have not performed this procedure before are at a disadvantage increased by the potential for severe hypoglycemia

At the present time, there are no ready-made formulations of glucagon; within hours of reconstitution, the molecule will degrade into amyloid fibrils. Combined with the anxiety of performing a rescue is expense, bulkiness, and concerns over dosing correctly; fortunately, there is no biochemical way to overdose on intramuscularly injected glucagon.

Instructions for the pharmacist clearly say to detach one half and deliver only the user instructions in the kit.

== Politics of glucagon rescue ==
Some U.S. union teacher contracts stipulate they shall not be allowed to deliver glucagon or even be trained in administration of glucagon.

== Glucagon 'mini-dose' instruction ==
The purpose of the off-label 'mini-dose' is to avoid an emergency condition that may require glucagon rescue. This might be needed in cases such as when a diabetic child is injected with insulin before breakfast, eats, and then vomits and cannot eat again: with the injected insulin working its way into the bloodstream and no carbohydrate to balance, there may soon be a hypoglycemic emergency. Medical studies have shown that the mini-dose rescue is tolerated well and effective.
