= Oral glucose gel =

Medication

Oral glucose gel is an over-the-counter medication, consisting primarily of dextrose and water, along with small amounts of other compounds. It is frequently used by people with diabetes and those with hypoglycaemia to raise their blood glucose when it becomes dangerously low.

Hypoglycaemia occurs when blood sugar levels drop too low; it can cause a variety of symptoms including hunger, sweating, rapid heart rate, and shaking. If left untreated, hypoglycaemia can lead to a loss of consciousness. Onset of hypoglycaemia can be sudden, requiring glucose levels to be normalised by consuming carbohydrates. Diabetics are generally recommended to carry 15 grams of glucose with them at all times.

== Use ==
Oral glucose gel is used to raise dangerously low blood glucose concentration or blood glucose that has dropped too low for the person's adaptive compensatory mechanisms to cope with. The gel may be self-administered or given by an Emergency Medical Technician or paramedic responding to a hypoglycaemic emergency.

As glucose molecules will absorb directly through oral tissue, the gel is either swallowed directly or allowed to stay in the mouth momentarily to facilitate rapid absorption via various areas of the mouth cavity and then swallowed to allow absorption into the blood via the small intestine.

== Effectiveness ==
Although oral glucose gel is often recommended to diabetics, including by medical providers and organisations such as Diabetes UK, its efficacy in treating hypoglycaemia has been questioned. A 1978 study demonstrated poor absorption through the oral mucosa, and concluded that such gels have therapeutic value only when swallowed by the patient.

A study published in the journal Diabetes Care found administration of glucagon a superior treatment for hypoglycaemia compared to oral glucose gel, with those receiving glucagon injections experiencing a significantly greater increase in mean capillary glucose concentration.

The American Red Cross Scientific Advisory Council recommend against the use of oral gels, in favour of more effective treatments such as glucagon injections or glucose tablets.

A 2013 Cochrane Review concluded glucose gels were an effective treatment for neonatal hypoglycaemia; a randomised, double-blind, placebo-controlled trial published by the same authors drew the same conclusion. However, a systematic review in 2016 found faults with the initial Cochrane review, including the possibility of bias due to the small number of studies analysed and poor evidence many of these studies offered, calling for further randomised control trials to be undertaken.

== Products ==
Oral glucose gel usually is found in single-use tubes providing a dose of 15 grams of glucose, or resealable tubes with a total of 45 grams of glucose. It is often fruit-flavoured. Available brands include Glucogel in the United Kingdom, and GlucoBurst and Insta-Glucose in the United States.
