= Talk to Me (1996 film) =

1996 American television film

- Written by: Dan Bronson
- Directed by: Graeme Campbell
- Starring: Veronica Hamel; Yasmine Bleeth; Peter Scolari; Jenny Lewis; Brenda Devine; Dawn Greenhalgh
- Music by: Peter Manning Robinson
- Country of origin: United States
- Original language: English

Production
- Producers: John Perrin Flynn; Jim Lichtenstein
- Cinematography: Richard Leiterman
- Editor: Lance Luckey
- Running time: 120 minutes

Original release
- Network: ABC
- Release: October 20, 1996

Talk to Me is a 1996 made-for-TV drama film directed by Graeme Campbell and starring Yasmine Bleeth and Ricky Paull Goldin. The film aired on ABC.

== Plot ==
Diane Shepherd is an idealistic talk-show producer, who is conscience-stricken, when she clashes with her ratings-obsessed and ruthless talk-show executive boss. Diane is forced to produce a tantalizing program about a prostitute which potentially harms the prostitute, who is trying to turn her life around.

Kelly Reilly is a teenaged mother whose life is exposed on The Howard Grant Show. Kelly desperately wants to lead a normal life, but society is dragging her back down.

== Cast ==
- Yasmine Bleeth as Diane Shepherd
- Jenny Lewis as Kelly Reilly
- Peter Scolari as Howard Grant
- Ricky Paull Goldin as Dwayne
- Veronica Hamel as Sadie
- Brenda Devine as Jeri Lonigan
- Dawn Greenhalgh as Brenda Reilly
- Robin Brille as Lucille-Ann
- Dorion Davis as Krystal
- Tracy Dawson as Thelma
- Heather Dick as Kathleen
- Terri Drennan as Bo-Peep
- D. Garnet Harding as Alan
- Kate Hennig as Stacy
- Karen Hines as Myra
- Lisa Hynes as Wanda
- Martin Julien as Randy
- Brian Kaulback as Cameraman
- Scott Wickware as Bill
- Mairlyn Smith as Lana
- Laina Timberg as Joey
- R.D. Reid as Vernon
- Martin Roach as Alex
- Cliff Saunders as Chyron
- Alison Sealy-Smith as Miriam
- Shakura S'Aida as Scarecrow
- James Kidnie as Redneck
- Walter Alza as Pusher
- Suzanne Coy as Prostitute
- Dominic Cuzzocrea as The Driver
- Reg Dreger as Manager #2
- Sam Malkin as The Director
- Ralph Small as Manager #1
- Jeff Topping as Son
- Anne Wessels as Elegant Woman
- Louis Wrightman as Junkie

== Production credits ==
- Graeme Campbell (Director)
- Dan Bronson (Writer)
- Steve White (Executive Producer)
- Jim Lichtenstein (Co-Executive Producer)
- John Perrin Flynn (Producer)
- Megan Callaway (co-producer)
