= Joint British Diabetes Societies for Inpatient Care group =

The Joint British Diabetes Societies for Inpatient Care group (JBDS-IP) was formed in 2008.

The group was commissioned, through NHS Diabetes, by 3 organisations (Diabetes UK, the Association of British Clinical Diabetologists (ABCD) and the Diabetes Inpatient Specialist Nurse (DISN) UK group.

The group was created and supported by and works with a number of stakeholders including NHS England, TREND-UK, GIRFT and with other professional organisations.

== Group membership ==
Members of JBDS-IP include specialists from across the countries of the United Kingdom including diabetes consultants, diabetes specialist nurses, pharmacists, trainees and representation from the member organisations. The group meets regularly.

== Guidelines development ==
The group has developed a wide range of evidence-based guidelines to improve quality of care and collaborated with a number of other stakeholders. Since its establishment it developed several evidence-based guidelines or wherever possible expert consensus to drive quality of inpatient diabetes care. The guidelines have been widely used across the UK and helped reduce variations by standardising approach to inpatient diabetes care.

- Hypoglycaemia
- Diabetic Ketoacidosis (DKA) in Adults
- Hyperosmolar hyperglycemia state (HHS) in adults with diabetes
- Glycaemic control in people with cancer
- Diabetes at the front door

All other guidelines are available free to download from the JBDS-IP website. Guidelines are published regularly in the Diabetic Medicine journal, available Open Access for free.
