= Mairlyn Smith =

Canadian actress

- Born: Vancouver, British Columbia, Canada
- Years active: 1980–present

Mairlyn Smith is a Canadian actress, author, critic, food blogger, television show host and professional home economist. She is well known in Canada for her various cookbooks and expert advice on CityLine and Breakfast TV in Toronto. Outside of Canada, Smith is well-known mostly for her roles as Mrs. Woodhouse, the morbid wife of Principal Woodhouse in the 1999 film The Virgin Suicides, and as Agnes Thurston, the overly cheerful deceased mother of Karen Thurston and wife of deceased chemical factory worker Mr. Thurston, on the 1990s Goosebumps film Welcome to Dead House. Smith resides in Ontario, Canada with her partner, Scott, and their son.

== Early life ==
Little is known about Mairlyn Smith's early life. Born in Vancouver, British Columbia, Smith graduated in 1976 with a degree in home economics from the University of British Columbia. She then returned to school and completed a teaching certificate before going on to teach home economics and head the Department of Fine Arts at Balmoral Junior High. Smith enrolled at the American Academy of Dramatic Arts in California. In the 1980s, she moved to Toronto to find work. Smith is an alumnus of The Second City comedy troupe and has starred in numerous commercials, TV shows, and films. She was initially known for her role as an actress, gaining international notability after her appearances in The Virgin Suicides and Welcome to Dead House (with co-actress Jessica Greco), among other roles. Within Canada, Smith's notable acting appearances included roles on Puppets Who Kill, Street Legal and Adderly, the latter of which was one of her most prominent acting roles in Canada. Smith's last credited acting role was in 2005, when she played a jogger on Puppets Who Kill.

Smith suffered a period of intense grief after the deaths of her mother and father, which occurred closely together. This led her to write her book Peace, Love and Fibre: Over 100 Fibre-Rich Recipes for the Whole Family. According to Smith, "when people don’t embrace their feelings, deciding to store them away for later, it can come back to bite them. You must admit to yourself that you are under stress and you need help. You have to accept the feeling is authentic." Smith openly discussed her mental health crisis at a FarmTech convention in Edmonton, Alberta. She later stated in a podcast for Eat North that her experience as an actress and her enjoyment of music and teacup collecting in her spare time were things that helped her in life and her economist career.

== Career ==
Aside from acting, which Mairlyn Smith ceased to participate in post-2005, Smith is a prominent Canadian cookbook author, home economist and food blogger. She has written a number of well-known cookbook titles, most of which promote homegrown eating, a comedic approach to the concept of gut health, Canadian nationalism and easy-to-make recipes. She has been praised by a variety of critics and news reporters, mostly within Canada, including Globe and Mail restaurant critic Dan Clapson, who said of Smith, "no stranger to the food media scene, best-selling cookbook author and CityLine regular, Mairlyn Smith just might be one of the most charming Canadian culinary experts across all media." Smith is a host of television show Harrowsmith Country Life and a subsequent Gemini award nominee. She is a regular guest on CityLine and Breakfast Television Toronto as the family foods specialist and nutrition expert. Toronto Sun noted Smith's prevalence in Canadian homemaking culture, saying, "with [Smith's] bubbly personality, you’ve most likely caught her on CityLine extolling the virtues of fibre. Or perhaps you’ve seen her on Facebook creating healthy recipes, or sharing a cup of tea on YouTube, or leafing through one of her many colourful cookbooks."

Mairlyn Smith regularly contributes to charitable work with her recipes, most notably for World Heart Day in 2010, when she shared free heart-healthy recipes via social media and news outlets, including a popular vegetable stew recipe.

== Published works ==
Mairlyn Smith has written a variety of cookbooks, both in print and in digital format. Her book Lick the Spoon! The Ultimate Healthy Eating Plan, Ultimate Foods for Ultimate Health won gold at the Cuisine Canada Cookbook Awards.

=== Bibliography ===
- The Ultimate Healthy Eating Plan (That Still Leaves Room for Chocolate)
- Lick the Spoon! The Ultimate Healthy Eating Plan, Ultimate Foods for Ultimate Health
- Healthy Starts Here!: 140 Recipes That Will Make You Feel Great
- Peace, Love and Fibre: Over 100 Fibre-Rich Recipes for the Whole Family
- Homegrown: Celebrating the Canadian Foods We Grow, Raise and Produce
- The Vegetarian's Complete Quinoa Cookbook (editor only)

=== Filmography ===
Year	Title	Role
1980	Zig Zag (TV series)	Host
1986	Love Me, Love Me Not (TV series)	Co-host/announcer
1986	Mafia Princess	Wedding guest
1987	Night Friend	Woman at party
1986-1987	Adderly (TV series)	Debbie Greenspan
1988	The Twilight Zone (TV series)	Real-estate agent
1988	Wild Guess (TV series)	Self
1990-1991	Street Legal (TV series)	Margaret Pearson
1992	Maniac Mansion (TV series)	Mrs. Vaughn
1994	The Babymaker: The Dr. Cecil Jacobson Story	Forewoman
1994	The Ref	Santa Family Member #1
1995	Harrison Bergeron	Janet Mckloskey
1996	Kung Fu: The Legend Continues (TV series)	Susan
1996	Talk to Me	Lana
1996	The Adventures of Moby Dick	Various voices
1997	Goosebumps Welcome to Dead House (TV movie)	Agnes Thurston
1999	The Virgin Suicides	Mrs. Woodhouse
2001	Queer As Folk (TV series)	Betty Barbarosa
2002	All Around The Town	Betsy
2004	Doc (TV series)	Carolyn Briant
2005	Puppets Who Kill (TV series)	Jogger
2009	The Great Food Revolution (TV series)	Self
2016	Four Senses (TV series)	Self
2016	My Left Frying Pan: Not Your Regular Cooking Show (YouTube)	Self, various
2018	Back in Time for Dinner (TV series)	The home economist
2018	Snak the Show (TV series)	Self

- Laura's Happy Adventures (video game, as "Marlyn Smith") - Clara (voice, 1998)

== See also ==
- Fart walk, a term Smith coined in early 2025 that went viral
