= Tight glycemic control =

Tight glycemic control in the context of intensive care medicine refers to the practice of controlling blood glucose levels to avoid hyperglycemia, which is often observed in patients with critical illness and is associated with higher mortality rates. This is typically done by monitoring a patient's blood glucose levels and administering insulin when they rise much above normal levels. The practice is now considered to be harmful (leading to hypoglycemia), but is still used by a quarter of emergency rooms.
