= Shatapawali =

Indian custom of walking after eating

śatapāvalī (Devanagari शतपावली) is a Marathi term that refers to an ancient Indian custom of taking a stroll after a meal. The word is a dvigu compound from shata "hundred" and paaul "step", which literally means "walking 100 steps" after a meal.
