= Chronic Somogyi rebound =

Theoretical elevated blood sugar for diabetics in the morning

Chronic Somogyi rebound is a contested explanation of phenomena of elevated blood sugars experienced by diabetics in the morning. Also called the Somogyi effect and posthypoglycemic hyperglycemia, it is a rebounding high blood sugar that is a response to low blood sugar. When managing the blood glucose level with insulin injections, this effect is counter-intuitive to people who experience high blood sugar in the morning as a result of an overabundance of insulin at night.

This theoretical phenomenon was named after Michael Somogyi [SHO moe jee], a Hungarian-born professor of biochemistry at the Washington University and Jewish Hospital of St. Louis, who prepared the first insulin treatment given to a child with diabetes in the US in October 1922. Somogyi showed that excessive insulin makes diabetes unstable and first published his findings in 1938.

Compare with the dawn phenomenon, which is a morning rise in blood sugar in response to waning insulin and a growth hormone surge (that further antagonizes insulin).

== Background ==
The rebounding blood sugar following undetected diabetic hypoglycemia can easily become chronic when the high morning blood sugar data is misjudged to be due to insufficient nighttime insulin delivery.

A person with type 1 diabetes should balance insulin delivery to manage their blood glucose level. Occasionally, insufficient insulin can result in hyperglycemia. The appropriate response is to take a correction dose of insulin to reduce the blood sugar level and to consider adjusting the insulin regimen to deliver additional insulin in the future to prevent hyperglycemia. Conversely, excessive insulin delivery may result in hypoglycemia. The appropriate response is to treat the hypoglycemia and to consider adjusting the regimen to reduce insulin in the future.

Somogyi and others have claimed that if prolonged hypoglycemia is untreated, then stress due to low blood sugar can result in a high blood glucose rebound. The physiological mechanisms driving the rebound are defensive. When the blood glucose level falls below normal, the body responds by releasing the endocrine hormone glucagon as well as the stress hormones epinephrine, cortisol and growth hormone. Glucagon facilitates release of glucose from the liver that raises the blood glucose immediately; the stress hormones cause insulin resistance for several hours, sustaining the elevated blood sugar.

== Detection ==
The first line of defense in preventing chronic Somogyi rebound is additional blood glucose testing. Continuous glucose monitoring is the preferred method to detect and prevent the Somogyi rebound, but this technology is far from universally used. Alternatively, testing blood sugar more often, 8 to 10 times daily with a traditional blood glucose meter, facilitates detecting the low blood sugar level before such a rebound occurs.

Testing occasionally during the middle of the night is also important, particularly when high waking blood sugars are found, to determine if more insulin is needed to prevent hyperglycemia or if less insulin is needed to prevent such a rebound.

Sometimes a person with diabetes will experience the Somogyi rebound when awake and notice symptoms of the initial low blood sugar or symptoms of the rebound. Waking with a night sweat (perhaps combined with a rapid heart rate) is a symptom of the adrenaline and rebound. Unfortunately, the evidence shows that patients with type 1 diabetes do not normally wake during nocturnal hypoglycemic episodes.

While reviewing log data of blood glucose after the fact, signs of Somogyi rebound should be suspected when blood glucose numbers seem higher after the insulin dosage has been raised, particularly in the morning. One simple way to determine if nocturnal hypoglycemia may be causing morning hyperglycemia is to have the patient have a high protein snack with a small amount of carbohydrates at bedtime. This will help keep the blood sugar up overnight and prevent the Somogyi effect. If the morning blood sugar decreases, this is indicative of the Somogyi effect and the daily insulin should be decreased.

== Avoidance ==
In theory, avoidance is simply a matter of preventing hyperinsulinemia. In practice, the difficulty for a diabetic person to aggressively dose insulin to keep blood sugars levels close to normal — while adjusting the insulin regimen to the demands of exercise, stress, and wellness — can practically assure occasional hyperinsulinemia. The pharmacokinetic imperfections of all insulin replacement regimens is a severe limitation.

Some practical behaviors which are useful in avoiding chronic Somogyi rebound are:

- frequent blood glucose monitoring (8–10 times daily);
- continuous blood glucose monitoring;
- logging and review of blood glucose values, searching for patterns of low blood sugar values;
- conservative increases in insulin delivery;
- awareness to the signs of hypoglycemia;
- awareness to hyperglycemia in response to increased delivery of insulin;
- use of appropriate types of insulin (long-acting, short-acting, etc.) in appropriate amounts.

== Controversy ==
Although this hypothesis is well known among clinicians and individuals with diabetes, there is little scientific evidence to support it. Clinical studies indicate that a high fasting glucose in the morning is more likely because the insulin given on the previous evening fails to last long enough. A study published in 2007 using continuous glucose monitoring showed that a low glucose during the night (nocturnal hypoglycemia) can be highly prevalent in type 1 diabetic treatments, but is associated rather with morning hypoglycemia, not hyperglycemia. Furthermore, many individuals with hypoglycemic episodes during the night do not wake due to a failure of release of epinephrine during nocturnal hypoglycemia. Thus, Somogyi's hypothesis is not assured and may be refuted.

== See also ==
- Idiopathic postprandial syndrome
- Reactive hypoglycemia
- Dawn phenomenon
