= Diabetes UK =

British charity

- Formerly: The Diabetic Association (1934-1954), British Diabetic Association (1954-2000)
- Type: Charity
- Founded: 1934
- Founder: H. G. Wells, Robert Daniel Lawrence
- Headquarters: Wells Lawrence House, 126 Back Church Lane, London, E1 1FH
- Number of locations: 7 including, London, Glasgow, Cardiff, Belfast, Warrington, Wolverhampton, and Taunton
- Key people: Colette Marshall (CEO) 2023-present, Chris Askew (CEO) 2015-2023
- Revenue: 38,841,000 pound sterling (2019)
- Number of employees: 458 (2023)
- Website: www.diabetes.org.uk

Diabetes UK is a British-based patient, healthcare professional and research charity that has been described as "one of the foremost diabetes charities in the UK". The charity campaigns for improvements in the care and treatment of people with diabetes.

== History ==
Diabetes UK was founded in 1934 as The Diabetic Association, by the author H. G. Wells and Robert Daniel Lawrence. Diabetes UK's first research grant was made in 1936. The organisation has since had two name changes—in 1954 to The British Diabetic Association and again in June 2000 to Diabetes UK.

Both founders were living with diabetes, and their aim was to make sure that everyone in the UK had access to insulin, regardless of their financial situation.

In 1999, the charity reviewed its services for people in their 20s to 40s, hoping to get more of that age group involved; at the time, 70% of younger people with diabetes were members but only 5% of people aged 20–40 with diabetes.

As of 2010, the charity's yearly income was £29,334,000.

== Services ==
=== Research ===
Diabetes UK provides funding for United Kingdom-based research into the causes and treatment of diabetes and its complications.

The charity's first research grant was made in 1936, which led to a major discovery in how the liver produces glucose.

The charity provides financial support for "project grants, funding to purchase laboratory equipment, and research-training opportunities ranging from PhD studentships to research fellowships." The research they fund covers all areas of diabetes, and there have been significant breakthroughs for both Type 1 treatment and Type 2 prevention and remission. They continue to invest more in research in the hope that, one day, they will find a cure.

In 2011, the charity awarded £1,035,743 to five new research grants, and £440,051 to five new PhD studentships.

In 2017, they invested over £6.7 million in diabetes research and agreed to support 38 new studies.

=== Campaigns ===
Alongside supporters, Diabetes UK have run campaigns like the 4Ts to help raise awareness of the symptoms of Type 1 diabetes. They supported children getting care in schools with their Make the Grade campaign, as well as equality of care and treatment across the UK with their Flash campaign, working to make the healthy choice the easy choice with their food labeling campaign.

=== Partnership ===
Diabetes UK work with a range of companies, trusts, foundations and philanthropists to help fund research breakthroughs and prevent Type 2 diabetes.

In 2008, Diabetes UK together with Association of British Clinical Diabetologists (ABCD) created the Joint British Diabetes Societies for Inpatient Care (JBDS-IP) group. The group generates guidelines for management of inpatient diabetes

In 2018, Diabetes UK began a new five-year strategic partnership with long-standing partner Tesco, alongside British Heart Foundation and Cancer Research UK, to tackle the UK's biggest health challenges through behaviour change.

=== Groups and Events ===
Diabetes UK has 330 local groups across the UK.

=== Conferences ===
The society runs conferences for people with diabetes, volunteers and healthcare professionals.

=== Telephone support services and helpline ===
In 1993, the organisation launched an information line for patients, family and friends.

=== Holidays ===
The charity has been providing holidays for children since the 1930s. Family and adult holidays have been introduced since.

=== Publications ===
Diabetes UK produces a range of information leaflets and booklets that raise awareness of diabetes, and offer support and knowledge to help in prevention of Type 2 and management of all types of diabetes. These include the magazine "Balance" (formerly The Diabetic Journal), first published in 1935, changing its name to Balance in 1961, and "Diabetes Update" for professionals.

Via John Wiley and Sons, Diabetes UK produces the academic journal, Diabetic Medicine.

The charity has also published practice guidelines for professionals.

=== Website ===
Diabetes UK website links people to information available. This includes healthcare professionals, parents, carers, and people living with diabetes. Their Learning Zone is an area to sign up and gain access to personalised support and tips in diabetes management from peers.

Since 14 November 2008, the Diabetes UK site has hosted a forum. This was originally under the URL diabetessupport.co.uk. On the 13th of October 2015, the forum had a major makeover to make clear the DUK connection; this involved moving to a new URL (the DUK URL prefixed with "forum"), changing the board logo (including favicon) and colour scheme to match the main site, and upgrading to new forum software.

== See also ==
- Diabetes
- American Diabetes Association
