= Michael Somogyi =

Hungarian-American biochemist (1883 – 1971)

- Somogyi Mihály
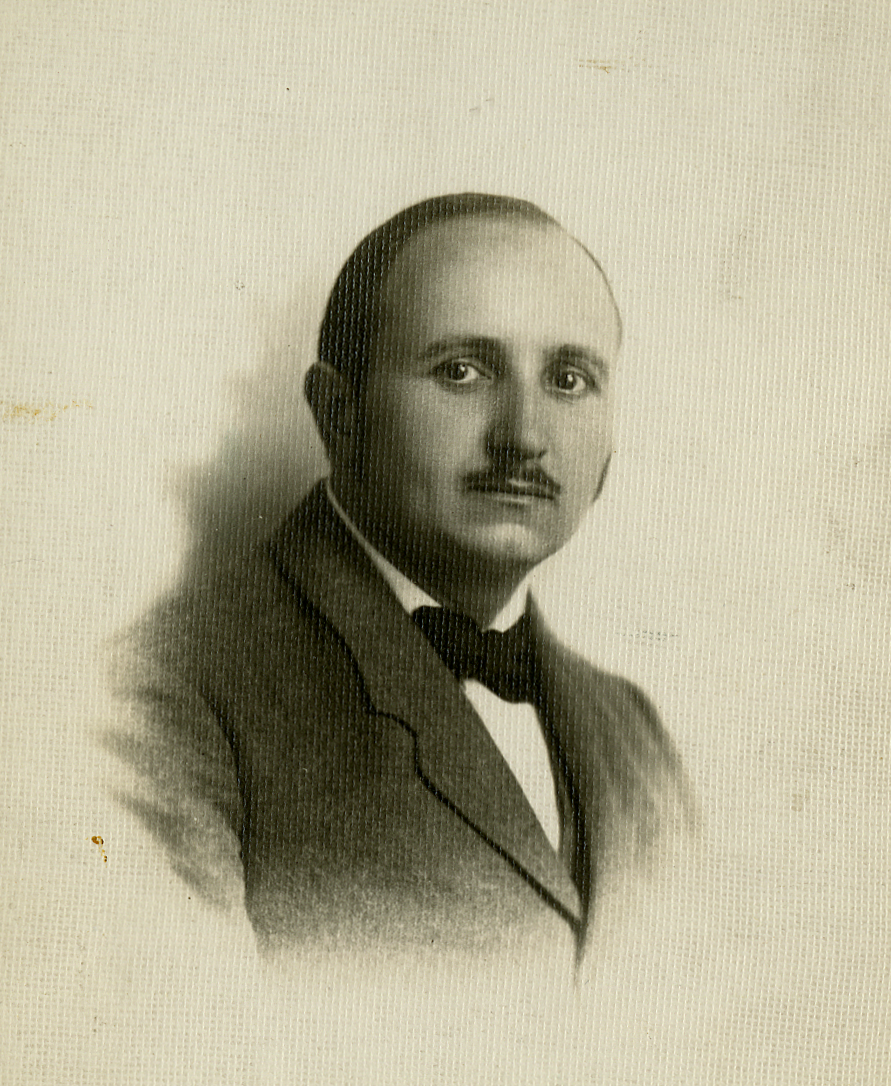
- Born: March 7, 1883; Zsámánd, Kingdom of Hungary (today part of Heiligenbrunn, Austria)
- Died: July 21, 1971 (aged 88); St. Louis, Missouri, U.S.
- Education: University of Budapest
- Known for: Somogyi effect
- Scientific career
- Workplaces: Washington University in St. Louis; Cornell University

Michael Somogyi (Note: Pronounced /ˈʃoʊmoʊd͡ʒi/ SHO-moe-jee; Hungarian: [ˈʃomoɟi]) (March 7, 1883 – July 21, 1971), born Mihály Steiner, was a Hungarian-American professor of biochemistry at Washington University in St. Louis and the Jewish Hospital of St. Louis. He prepared the first insulin treatment given to a child with diabetes in the US in October 1922. Somogyi later speculated that excessive insulin makes diabetes unstable in the Chronic Somogyi rebound to which he gave his name.

== Career ==
Somogyi was born on March 7, 1883, in the village of Zsámánd in Hungary (today Reinersdorf, part of Heiligenbrunn, Austria). He graduated in chemical engineering from the University of Budapest in 1905.

After an additional year as an assistant in biochemistry, Somogyi went to the United States, where he eventually found a position as an assistant in biochemistry at Cornell University (1906–1908). He returned to Budapest where he worked at the Municipal Laboratory for the next decade. In 1914, he received his Ph.D. from the University of Budapest, submitting a dissertation on catalytic hydrogenation. During World War I he was in charge of providing food to the destitute.

Somogyi was invited to return to the United States by Philip A. Shaffer, whom he had known at Cornell. In 1922 Somogyi became an instructor in biochemistry at Washington University School of Medicine. There Somogyi worked with Shaffer and Edward Adelbert Doisy on insulin preparation and insulin's use in the treatment of diabetes. In 1926, Somogyi became the first biochemist on the staff of the new Jewish Hospital of St. Louis where he worked closely with physicians. He directed the hospital's clinical laboratory until he retired in 1957.

== Research ==
Insulin was discovered in 1921, by Frederick Banting, Charles Best and John Macleod at the University of Toronto. At a time when most child diabetics lived no more than months or a few years, insulin offered the hope of extending lives. Somogyi worked with Philip A. Shaffer and Edward Adelbert Doisy on insulin preparation and insulin's use in the treatment of diabetes. He developed a method for extracting insulin from the pancreases of dogs. In 1922 doctors treated the first diabetic American child, a baby boy, with Somogyi's insulin.

Somogyi also developed a quicker, less expensive method for screening for diabetes, using sodium carbonate, urine, and heat. This led to the development of popular tests, including several varieties of urine sugar comparator from the Aloe Company of Saint Louis, Missouri. Urine Sugar Test kits were also produced by Eli Lilly and Company.

Paper Somogyi Urine sugar test, c. 1930–1950

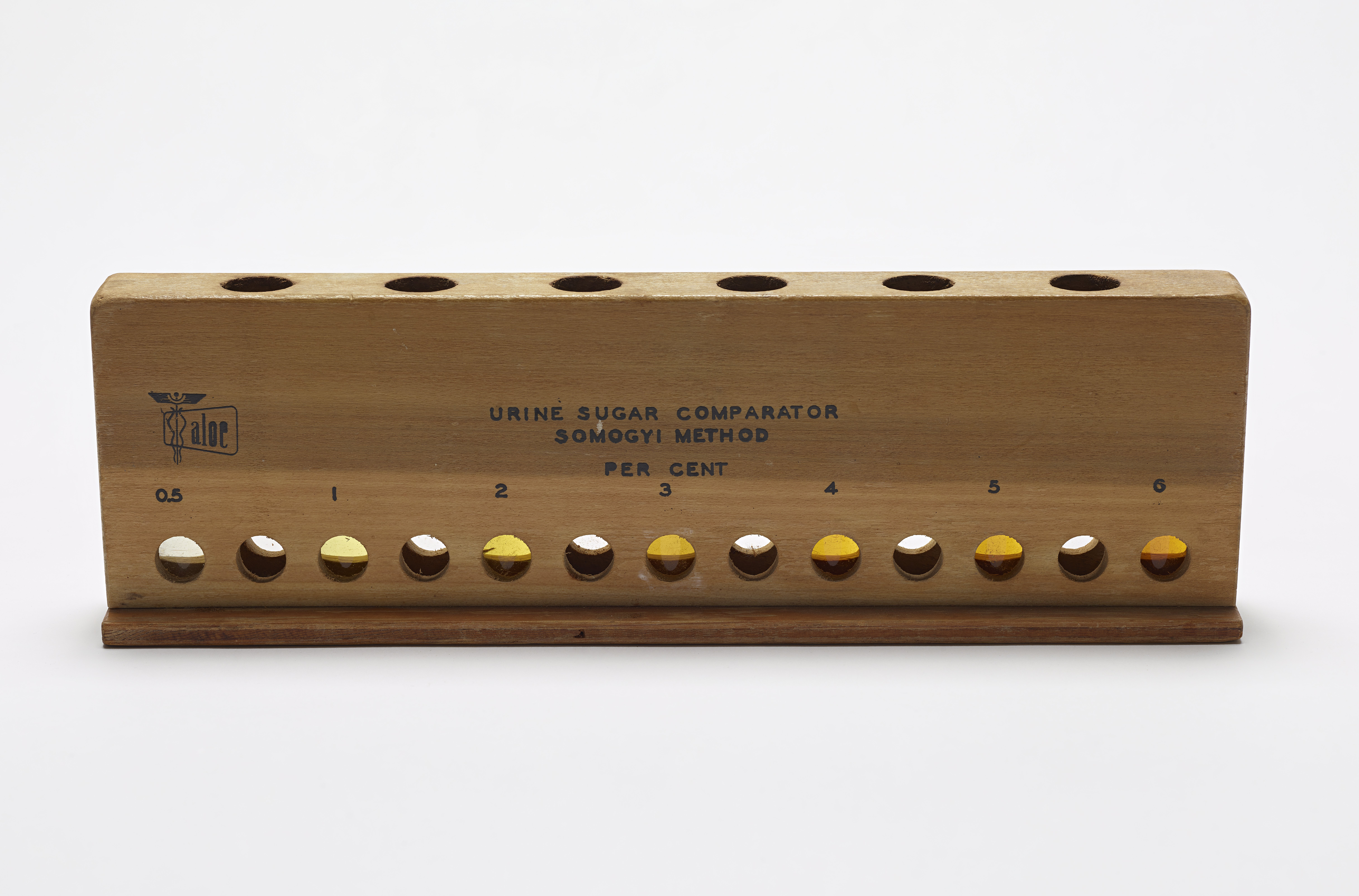
Wooden Somogyi Urine sugar comparator, c. 1930–1950

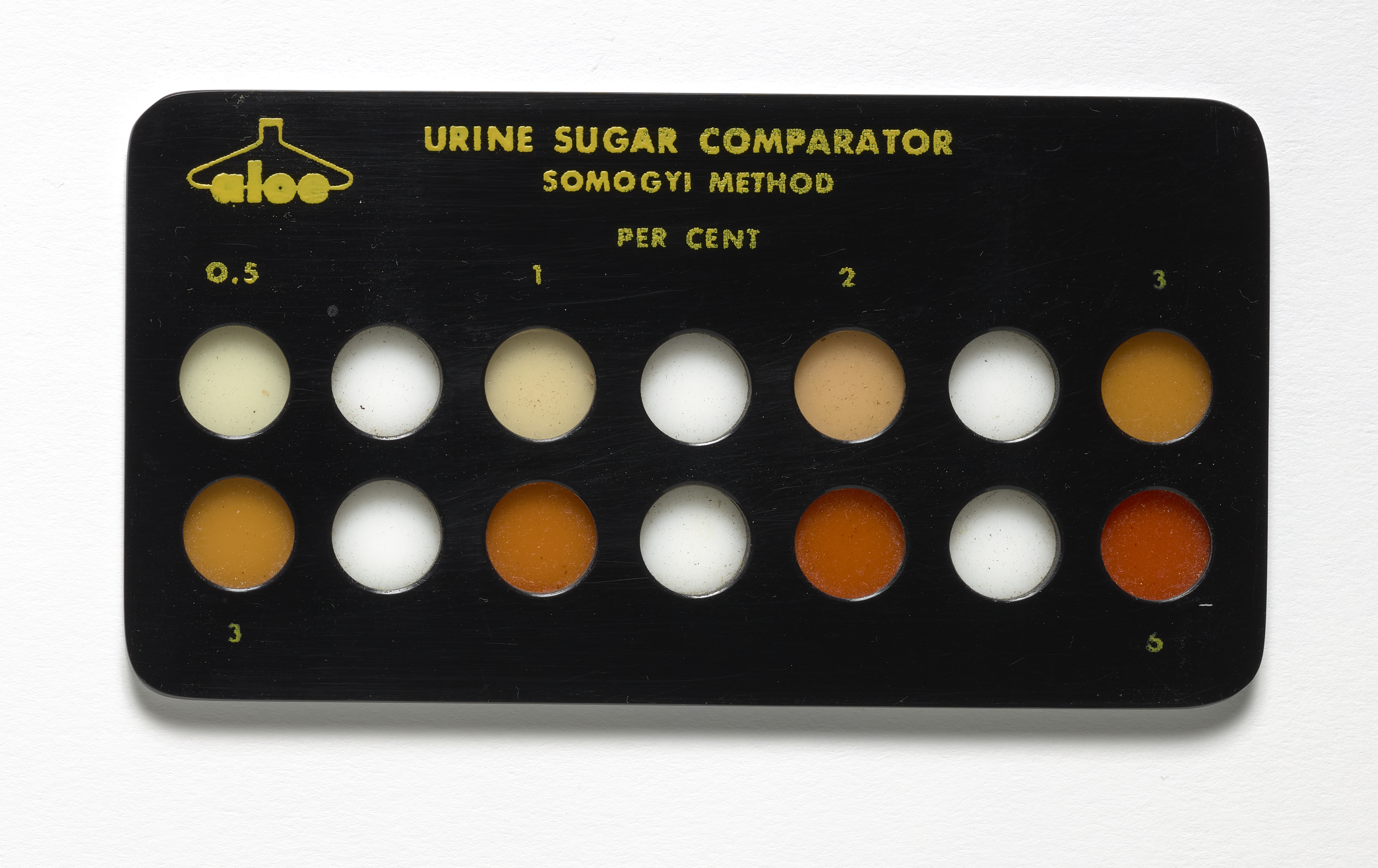
Plastic Somogyi Urine sugar comparator, c. 1930–1950

In 1938 Somogyi published findings showing that excessive insulin can make diabetes management unstable and increase the difficulty of treatment. The Chronic Somogyi rebound, a form of post-hypoglycemic hyperglycemia that Somogyi theorized could occur as a defensive mechanism, is named for him. It can be confused with the Dawn phenomenon and whether or not Somogyi's theory is actually correct is still contested.

In 1949, Somogyi argued against the use of high doses of insulin on the grounds that it was a potentially dangerous form of treatment. He also argued that many diabetic patients could successfully manage their conditions through a combination of diet and weight loss.

In 1969, Somogyi had a stroke. He died on 21 July 1971.
