= Diabetic Hypoglycemia (journal) =

- Discipline: Diabetes
- Language: English
- Edited by: Brian M. Frier

Publication details
- History: 2008-present
- Publisher: ESP Bioscience
- Frequency: Triannually
- Open access: Yes

Standard abbreviations
- ISO 4: Diabet. Hypoglycemia

Indexing
- ISSN: 1757-2428
- OCLC no.: 643791645

Links
- Journal homepage

Diabetic Hypoglycemia is a triannual open access peer-reviewed medical journal published by ESP Bioscience. It publishes review articles on all aspects of hypoglycemia in diabetes including: basic science, molecular genetics, pathophysiology, epidemiology, and clinical aspects of hypoglycemia prevention, diagnosis and management. The journal was established in 2008, with the support of an unrestricted educational grant from Novo Nordisk. It is abstracted and indexed in EMBASE and Scopus.

== Journal content ==
Regular journal content includes Editorials, a "Hypo survey question" (an interactive multiple-choice question and answer, typically on a topic that is complementary to the editorial), a Discussion forum, a Feature article, a News article (an expert round-up of abstracts from a recent major congress or meeting and of recent publications relating to diabetic hypoglycemia, with review and commentary by members of the editorial board), Clinical case studies, "In profile" (in-depth interview with a leading expert in diabetes management), Treatment review (topical review on a particular area of diabetes and diabetic hypoglycemia treatment, with commentary by a member of the editorial board), and Webwatch (review of a relevant diabetes/hypoglycemia website).
