= Diabetic coma =

Medical condition

- Universal blue circle symbol for diabetes.
- Specialty: Endocrinology

Diabetic coma is a life-threatening but reversible form of coma found in people with diabetes mellitus.

Three different types of diabetic coma are identified:

1. Severe low blood sugar in a diabetic person
2. Diabetic ketoacidosis (usually type 1) advanced enough to result in unconsciousness from a combination of a severely increased blood sugar level, dehydration and shock, and exhaustion
3. Hyperosmolar nonketotic coma (usually type 2) in which an extremely high blood sugar level and dehydration alone are sufficient to cause unconsciousness.

In most medical contexts, the term diabetic coma refers to the diagnostical dilemma posed when a physician is confronted with an unconscious patient about whom nothing is known except that they have diabetes. An example might be a physician working in an emergency department who receives an unconscious patient wearing a medical identification tag saying DIABETIC. Paramedics may be called to rescue an unconscious person by friends who identify them as diabetic. Brief descriptions of the three major conditions are followed by a discussion of the diagnostic process used to distinguish among them, as well as a few other conditions which must be considered.

An estimated 2 to 15 percent of people with diabetes will have at least one episode of diabetic coma in their lifetimes as a result of severe hypoglycemia.

== Types ==
=== Severe hypoglycemia ===
People with type 1 diabetes mellitus who must take insulin in full replacement doses are most vulnerable to episodes of hypoglycemia (low blood glucose levels). This can occur if a person takes too much insulin or diabetic medication, does strenuous exercise without eating additional food, misses meals, consumes too much alcohol, or consumes alcohol without food. It is usually mild enough to reverse by eating or drinking carbohydrates, but blood glucose occasionally can fall fast enough and low enough to produce unconsciousness before hypoglycemia can be recognized and reversed. Hypoglycemia can be severe enough to cause unconsciousness during sleep. Predisposing factors can include eating less than usual or prolonged exercise earlier in the day. Some people with diabetes can lose their ability to recognize the symptoms of early hypoglycemia.

Unconsciousness due to hypoglycemia can occur within 20 minutes to an hour after early symptoms and is not usually preceded by other illness or symptoms. Twitching or convulsions may occur. A person unconscious from hypoglycemia is usually pale, has a rapid heart beat, and is soaked in sweat: all signs of the adrenaline response to hypoglycemia. The individual is not usually dehydrated and breathing is normal or shallow. Their blood sugar level, measured by a glucose meter or laboratory measurement at the time of discovery, is usually low but not always severely, and in some cases may have already risen from the nadir that triggered the unconsciousness.

Unconsciousness due to hypoglycemia is treated by raising the blood glucose with intravenous glucose or injected glucagon.

=== Advanced diabetic ketoacidosis ===
Diabetic ketoacidosis (DKA), most typically seen in those with type 1 diabetes, is triggered by the build-up of chemicals called ketones. These are strongly acidic and a build-up can cause the blood to become acidic. When these levels get too high it essentially poisons the body and causes DKA.

If it progresses and worsens without treatment it can eventually cause unconsciousness, from a combination of a very high blood sugar level, dehydration and shock, and exhaustion. Coma only occurs at an advanced stage, usually after 36 hours or more of worsening vomiting and hyperventilation.

In the early to middle stages of ketoacidosis, patients are typically flushed and breathing rapidly and deeply, but visible dehydration, pale appearance from diminished perfusion, shallower breathing, and a fast heart rate are often present when coma is reached. However these features are variable and not always as described.

If the patient is known to have diabetes, the diagnosis of diabetic ketoacidosis is usually suspected from the appearance and a history of 1–2 days of vomiting. The diagnosis is confirmed when the usual blood chemistries in the emergency department reveal a high blood sugar level and severe metabolic acidosis.

Treatment of diabetic ketoacidosis consists of isotonic fluids to rapidly stabilize the circulation, continued intravenous saline with potassium and other electrolytes to replace deficits, insulin to reverse the ketoacidosis, and careful monitoring for complications.

=== Nonketotic hyperosmolar coma ===
Nonketotic hyperosmolar coma usually develops more insidiously than diabetic ketoacidosis because the principal symptom is lethargy progressing to obtundation, rather than vomiting and an obvious illness. Extremely high blood sugar levels are accompanied by dehydration due to inadequate fluid intake. Coma occurs most often in patients who have type 2 or steroid diabetes and have an impaired ability to recognize thirst and drink. It is classically a nursing home condition but can occur in all ages.

The diagnosis is usually discovered when a chemistry screen performed because of obtundation reveals an extremely high blood sugar level (often above 1800 mg/dl (100 mM)) and dehydration. The treatment consists of insulin and gradual rehydration with intravenous fluids.

=== Identifying the cause ===
Diabetic coma was a more significant diagnostic problem before the late 1970s, when glucose meters and rapid blood chemistry analyzers were not available in all hospitals. In modern medical practice, it rarely takes more than a few questions, a quick look, and a glucose meter to determine the cause of unconsciousness in a patient with diabetes. Laboratory confirmation can usually be obtained in half an hour or less. Other conditions that can cause unconsciousness in a person with diabetes are stroke, uremic encephalopathy, alcohol, drug overdose, head injury, or seizure.

Most patients do not reach the point of unconsciousness or coma in cases of diabetic hypoglycemia, diabetic ketoacidosis, or severe hyperosmolarity before a family member or caretaker seeks medical help.

== Treatment ==
Treatment depends upon the underlying cause:

- Hypoglycemic diabetic coma: administration of the hormone glucagon to reverse the effects of insulin, or glucose given intravenously.
- Ketoacidotic diabetic coma: intravenous fluids, insulin and administration of potassium and sodium.
- Hyperosmolar diabetic coma: plenty of intravenous fluids, insulin, potassium and sodium given as soon as possible.
