= Intensive insulin therapy =

Therapeutic regimen for diabetes mellitus treatment

Intensive insulin therapy or flexible insulin therapy is a therapeutic regimen for diabetes mellitus treatment. This newer approach contrasts with conventional insulin therapy. Rather than minimize the number of insulin injections per day (a technique which demands a rigid schedule for food and activities), the intensive approach favors flexible meal times with variable carbohydrate as well as flexible physical activities. The trade-off is the increase from 2 or 3 injections per day to 4 or more injections per day, which was considered "intensive" relative to the older approach. In North America in 2004, many endocrinologists prefer the term "flexible insulin therapy" (FIT) to "intensive therapy" and use it to refer to any method of replacing insulin that attempts to mimic the pattern of small continuous basal insulin secretion of a working pancreas combined with larger insulin secretions at mealtimes. The semantic distinction reflects changing treatment.

== Rationale ==
Long-term studies like the UK Prospective Diabetes Study (UKPDS) and the Diabetes control and complications trial (DCCT) showed that intensive insulin therapy achieved blood glucose levels closer to non-diabetic people and that this was associated with reduced frequency and severity of blood vessel damage. Damage to large and small blood vessels (macro- and microvascular disease) is central to the development of complications of diabetes.

This evidence convinced most physicians who specialize in diabetes care that an important goal of treatment is to make the biochemical profile of the diabetic patient (blood lipids, HbA1c, etc.) as close to the values of non-diabetic people as possible. This is especially true for young patients with many decades of life ahead.

== General description ==
A working pancreas continually secretes small amounts of insulin into the blood to maintain normal glucose levels, which would otherwise rise from glucose release by the liver, especially during the early morning dawn phenomenon. This insulin is referred to as basal insulin secretion, and constitutes almost half the insulin produced by the normal pancreas.

Bolus insulin is produced during the digestion of meals. Insulin levels rise immediately as we begin to eat, remaining higher than the basal rate for 1 to 4 hours. This meal-associated (prandial) insulin production is roughly proportional to the amount of carbohydrate in the meal.

Intensive or flexible therapy involves supplying a continual supply of insulin to serve as the basal insulin, supplying meal insulin in doses proportional to nutritional load of the meals, and supplying extra insulin when needed to correct high glucose levels. These three components of the insulin regimen are commonly referred to as basal insulin, bolus insulin, and high glucose correction insulin.

=== Two common regimens: pens, injection ports, and pumps ===
One method of intensive insulinotherapy is based on multiple daily injections (sometimes referred to in medical literature as MDI). Meal insulin is supplied by injection of rapid-acting insulin before each meal in an amount proportional to the meal. Basal insulin is provided as a once or twice daily injection of dose of a long-acting insulin.

In an MDI regimen, long-acting insulins are preferred for basal use. An older insulin used for this purpose is ultralente, and beef ultralente in particular was considered for decades to be the gold standard of basal insulin. Long-acting insulin analogs such as insulin glargine (brand name Lantus, made by Sanofi-Aventis) and insulin detemir (brand name Levemir, made by Novo) are also used, with insulin glargine used more than insulin detemir. Rapid-acting insulin analogs such as lispro (brand name Humalog, made by Eli Lilly and Company) and aspart (brand name Novolog/Novorapid, made by Novo and Apidra made by Sanofi Aventis) are preferred by many clinicians over older regular insulin for meal coverage and high correction. Many people on MDI regimens carry insulin pens to inject their rapid-acting insulins instead of traditional syringes. Some people on an MDI regimen also use injection ports such as the I-port to minimize the number of daily skin punctures.

The other method of intensive/flexible insulin therapy is an insulin pump. It is a small mechanical device about the size of a deck of cards. It contains a syringe-like reservoir with about three days' insulin supply. This is connected by thin, disposable, plastic tubing to a needle-like cannula inserted into the patient's skin and held in place by an adhesive patch. The infusion tubing and cannula must be removed and replaced every few days.

An insulin pump can be programmed to infuse a steady amount of rapid-acting insulin under the skin. This steady infusion is termed the basal rate and is designed to supply the background insulin needs. Each time the patient eats, he or she must press a button on the pump to deliver a specified dose of insulin to cover that meal. Extra insulin is also given the same way to correct a high glucose reading. Although current pumps can include a glucose sensor, they cannot automatically respond to meals or to rising or falling glucose levels.

Both MDI and pumping can achieve similarly excellent glycemic control. Some people prefer injections because they are less expensive than pumps and do not require the wearing of a continually attached device. However, the clinical literature is very clear that patients whose basal insulin requirements tend not to vary throughout the day or do not require dosage precision smaller than 0.5 IU, are much less likely to realize much significant advantage of pump therapy. Another perceived advantage of pumps is the freedom from syringes and injections, however, infusion sets still require less frequent injections to guide infusion sets into the subcutaneous tissue.

Intensive/flexible insulin therapy requires frequent blood glucose checking. To achieve the best balance of blood sugar with either intensive/flexible method, a patient must check his or her glucose level with a meter monitoring of blood glucose several times a day. This allows optimization of the basal insulin and meal coverage as well as correction of high glucose episodes.

== Advantages and disadvantages ==
The two primary advantages of intensive/flexible therapy over more traditional two or three injection regimens are:

1. greater flexibility of meal times, carbohydrate quantities, and physical activities, and
2. better glycemic control to reduce the incidence and severity of the complications of diabetes.

Major disadvantages of intensive/flexible therapy are that it requires greater amounts of education and effort to achieve the goals, and it increases the daily cost for glucose monitoring four or more times a day. This cost can substantially increase when the therapy is implemented with an insulin pump and/or continuous glucose monitor.

It is a common notion that more frequent hypoglycemia is a disadvantage of intensive/flexible regimens. The frequency of hypoglycemia increases with increasing effort to achieve normal blood glucoses with most insulin regimens, but hypoglycemia can be minimized with appropriate glucose targets and control strategies. The difficulties lie in remembering to test, estimating meal size, taking the meal bolus and eating within the prescribed time, and being aware of snacks and meals that are not the expected size. When implemented correctly, flexible regimens offer greater ability to achieve good glycemic control with easier accommodation to variations of eating and physical activity.

A 2020 Cochrane systematic review did not find enough evidence of reduction of cardiovascular mortality, non-fatal myocardial infarction or non-fatal stroke when comparing insulin to metformin monotherapy.

== Semantics of changing care: why "flexible" is replacing "intensive" therapy ==
Over the last two decades, the evidence that better glycemic control (i.e., keeping blood glucose and HbA1c levels as close to normal as possible) reduces the rates of many complications of diabetes has become overwhelming. As a result, diabetes specialists have expended increasing effort to help most people with diabetes achieve blood glucose levels as close to normal as achievable. It takes about the same amount of effort to achieve good glycemic control with a traditional two or three injection regimen as it does with flexible therapy: frequent glucose monitoring, attention to timing and amounts of meals. Many diabetes specialists no longer think of flexible insulin therapy as "intensive" or "special" treatment for a select group of patients but simply as standard care for most patients with type 1 diabetes.

== Treatment devices used ==
The insulin pump is one device used in intensive insulinotherapy. The insulin pump is about the size of a beeper. It can be programmed to send a steady stream of insulin as basal insulin. It contains a reservoir or cartridge holding several days' worth of insulin, the tiny battery-operated pump, and the computer chip that regulates how much insulin is pumped. The infusion set is a thin plastic tube with a fine needle at the end. There are also newer "pods" which do not require tubing. It carries the insulin from the pump to the infusion site beneath the skin. It sends a larger amount before eating meals as "bolus" doses.

The insulin pump replaces insulin injections. This device is useful for people who regularly forget to inject themselves or for people who don't like injections. This machine does the injecting by replacing the slow-acting insulin for basal needs with an ongoing infusion of rapid-acting insulin.

Basal insulin: the insulin that controls blood glucose levels between meals and overnight. It controls glucose in the fasting state.

Boluses: the insulin that is released when food is eaten or to correct a high reading.

Another device used in intensive insulinotherapy is the injection port. An injection port is a small disposable device, similar to the infusion set used with an insulin pump, configured to accept a syringe. Standard insulin injections are administered through the injection port. When using an injection port, the syringe needle always stays above the surface of the skin, thus reducing the number of skin punctures associated with intensive insulinotheraphy.
