= Diabetes management software =

Health management software

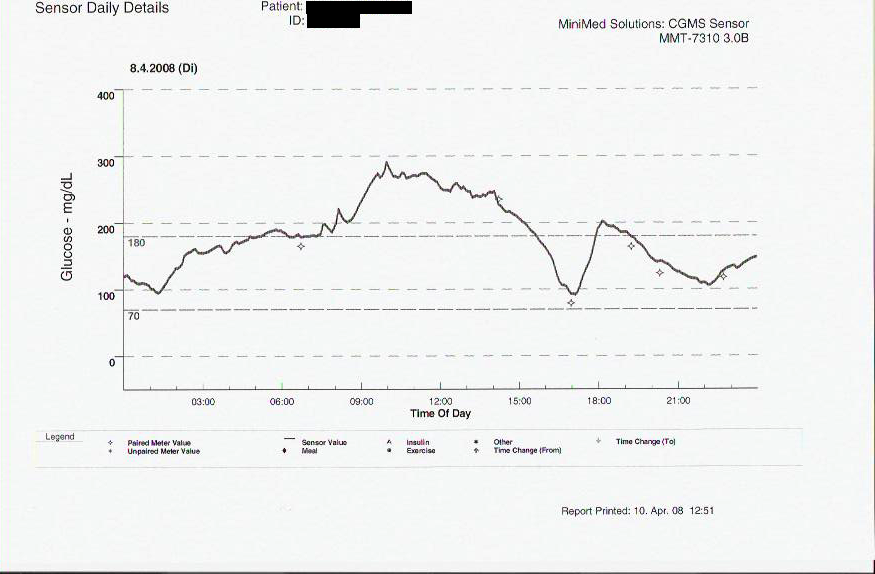
Example 7: A plot utilizing data from a continuous glucose monitoring system.

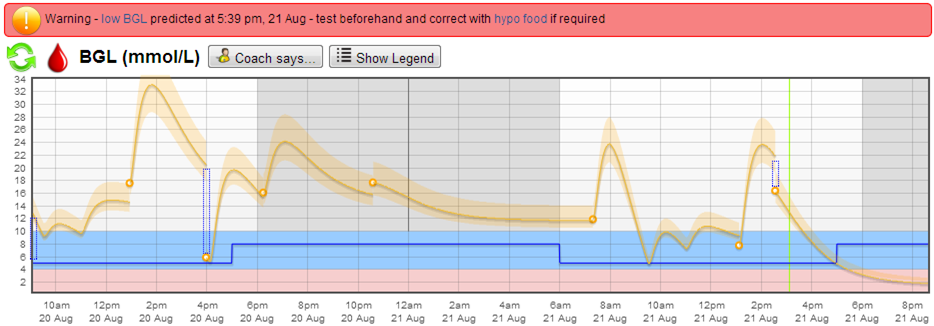
Example 8. Blood Glucose Prediction trace without CGM, utilizing data from a blood glucose meter, insulin and carb intake

Diabetes Management Software refers to software tools that run on personal computers and personal digital assistants to help persons with Type 1 and Type 2 diabetes manage the data associated with:

- blood test results from a glucose meter
- diabetes logbooks
- basal and bolus settings for an insulin pump
- records of actual insulin delivery
- records of carbohydrates eaten and bloused to cover
- statistical evaluation
- manual log entries for exercise and other factors
- coaching of dose corrections
- prediction of future blood sugars, etc.

== Features and uses ==
Conducting regular self-management tasks such as medication and insulin intake, blood sugar checkup, diet observance, and physical exercise are really demanding. This is why the use of diabetes-related apps for the purposes of recording diet and medication intake or blood glucose level is promising to improve the health condition for the patients. There are many products available to help maintain records and analyze trends related to diabetes care. Some support a single diabetes tool such as one manufacturers glucose meter, while others are intended to interface with many manufacturers products. Some diabetes management software is free to download or can be used on-line, while others are for sale (or shareware). Some are simple and easy to use for a single user, while others have very powerful features that support many users in a clinical setting. The emergence of user-friendly mobile devices has resulted in renewed interest in diabetes mobile applications, and there is a 2011 review article of the currently available features compared against evidence-based recommendations for diabetes self-management.

Depending on the product selected, there are a variety of features which include:

- summary tables or diabetes logbook data that can be:
  - imported from multiple sources,
  - viewed on the screen,
  - saved and archived for personal use,
  - printed, faxed, emailed or shared online with your diabetes care team.
- charts to analyze:
  - visualization of repeating patterns,
  - blood glucose trends for evaluation of
    - compliance with goals, and
    - consideration for new insulin adjustments, and
    - future predictions of blood glucose levels,
- control screens for:
  - insulin pump setup and control,
  - continuous blood glucose monitoring setup and control.

== Examples ==
=== Logbook ===
Example 1 shows a logbook can combine readings from multiple meters (such as one at home and another at work or school) in one place. Breakfast, lunch, and dinner readings are lined up vertically to help look for trends. The logbook automatically colors the box red for a low blood sugar, and blue for a high blood sugar. In the example chart, a pattern is easy to visualize: mornings tend to be a bit high (more insulin is needed at night) and there is a pattern of lows occurring after dinner (perhaps dinner insulin or the afternoon basal rates could be turned down).

=== Standard day data plots ===
The Standard day data plots, see example 2, shows that trends are easy to see. The blood glucose readings are plotted at their level versus the time of day. Multiple days are plotted on top of each other, creating a scatter of points. In the example shown, it is easy to see the glycemic excursions to high blood sugars following breakfast and lunch. Once identified, this can be improved by using a faster acting insulin, or injecting insulin 20 minutes before eating, or by selecting carbohydrates to eat that are slower to peak in the bloodstream.

=== Pie charts ===
Example 3 shows that pie charts are a quick way to judge performance of insulin doses throughout the day relative to the goal of keeping 75% of premeal blood glucose readings within boundaries. Sub-charts automatically break down to breakfast, lunch, dinner, and late night, as well as show pre-meal versus post-meal statistics. In the example pie chart shown, it appears there is an opportunity to improve morning lows and afternoon highs with insulin adjustments.

=== Daily views ===
Example 4 evaluates the delivery from an insulin pump, showing blood glucose plots along the top, carbohydrates eaten (bubbles in the middle of the chart), basal and bolus insulin delivered at the bottom. This is a good example of the flexibility in lifestyle afforded to an insulin pump user as carbohydrates are not "scheduled" to match insulin profiles, and yet the glycemic excursions are well controlled. In this chart, it is also easy to see that the pump user had a meal at 3pm but forgot to test blood glucose beforehand.

=== Basal pattern control ===
Example 5 shows a control screen for basal delivery from an insulin pump. Time of day and basal rate in units per hour can be modified to create a custom basal rate pattern to match the insulin needs of the pump user. Icons are shown which save or read data from the PC, or to upload and download it from the pump.

=== Bolus control ===
Example 6 shows bolus control on this screen. The insulin to carbohydrate ratio is stored in the pump as a function of the meal eaten (time of day). This screen selects grams of carbohydrate as the input parameter from the user, such that the pump can calculate the insulin bolus desired from the grams entered and the insulin to carb ratio that is stored.

=== CGMS ===
Example 7 shows a data plot from a continuous glucose monitoring system (CGMS). This plot shows the blood sugar levels between meals and also during the night, when other BG testing methods using a finger prick sample would typically miss the data available between samples. CGMS data is a new technology that it intended to give immediate feedback between finger sticks and also predict (by extrapolation) what may be happening soon to give the diabetic person a chance to correct a high or low blood sugar condition before it becomes urgent. This curve also illustrates the dawn effect.

=== Prediction ===
Example 8 shows a data plot from a continuous glucose prediction system (CGPS). This plot shows the blood sugar levels between meals and also during the night, when other BG testing methods using a finger prick sample would typically miss the data available between samples. CGPS is a new technology that it intended to give immediate feedback between finger sticks and also predict what may be happening soon to give the person with diabetes a chance to correct a high or low blood sugar condition before it becomes urgent.

Globally, an estimated 422 million adults are living with diabetes mellitus, according to the latest 2016 data from the World Health Organization (WHO). Diabetes prevalence is increasing rapidly; previous 2013 estimates from the International Diabetes Federation put the number at 381 million people having diabetes. The number is projected to almost double by 2030. Type 2 diabetes makes up about 85-90% of all cases. Increases in the overall diabetes prevalence rates largely reflect an increase in risk factors for type 2, notably greater longevity and being overweight. Diabetes mellitus occurs throughout the world, but is more common is type 2 diabetes in the more developed countries. The greatest increase in prevalence is, however, occurring in low and middle-income countries including in Asia and Africa, where most patients will probably be found by 2030. The increase in incidence in developing countries follows the trend of urbanization and lifestyle changes, including increasingly sedentary lifestyles, less physically demanding work and the global nutrition transition, marked by increased intake of foods that are high energy-dense but nutrient-poor (often high in sugar and saturated fats, sometimes referred to as the Western pattern diet). The risk of getting type 2 diabetes has been widely found to be associated with lower socio-economic position across countries. The WHO estimates that diabetes resulted in 1.5 million deaths in 2012, making it the 8th leading cause of death. However another 2.2 million deaths worldwide were attributable to high blood glucose and the increased risks of associated complications (e.g. heart disease, stroke, kidney failure), which often result in premature death and are often listed as the underlying cause on death certificates rather than diabetes. The number of people with diabetes has risen from 108 million in 1980 to 422 million in 2014. The global prevalence of diabetes among adults over 18 years of age has risen from 4.7% in 1980 to 8.5% in 2014. Diabetes prevalence has been rising more rapidly in middle and low-income countries. Diabetes is a major cause of blindness, kidney failure, heart attacks, stroke and lower limb amputation. In 2012, an estimated 1.5 million deaths were directly caused by diabetes and another 2.2 million deaths were attributable to high blood glucose. Half of all deaths attributable to high blood glucose occur before the age of 70 years. WHO projects that diabetes will be the 7th leading cause of death in 2030 . Healthy diet, regular physical activity, maintaining a normal body weight and avoiding tobacco use are ways to prevent or delay the onset of type 2 diabetes. Diabetes can be treated and its consequences avoided or delayed with diet, physical activity, medication and regular screening and treatment for complications. Epidemiologic patterns of T1D by demographic, geographic, biologic, cultural and other factors in populations are presented to gain insight about the etiology, natural history, risks, and complications of T1D. Data from large epidemiologic studies worldwide indicate that the incidence of T1D has been increasing by 2–5% worldwide and that the prevalence of T1D is approximately 1 in 300 in the US by 18 years of age. Research on risk factors for T1D is an active area of research to identify genetic and environmental triggers that could potentially be targeted for intervention. While significant advances have been made in the clinical care of T1D with resultant improvements in quality of life and clinical outcomes, much more needs to be done to improve care of, and ultimately find a cure for T1D. Epidemiologic studies have an important on-going role to investigate the complex causes, clinical care, prevention, and cure of T1D.
