= Robert Channon =

British inventor

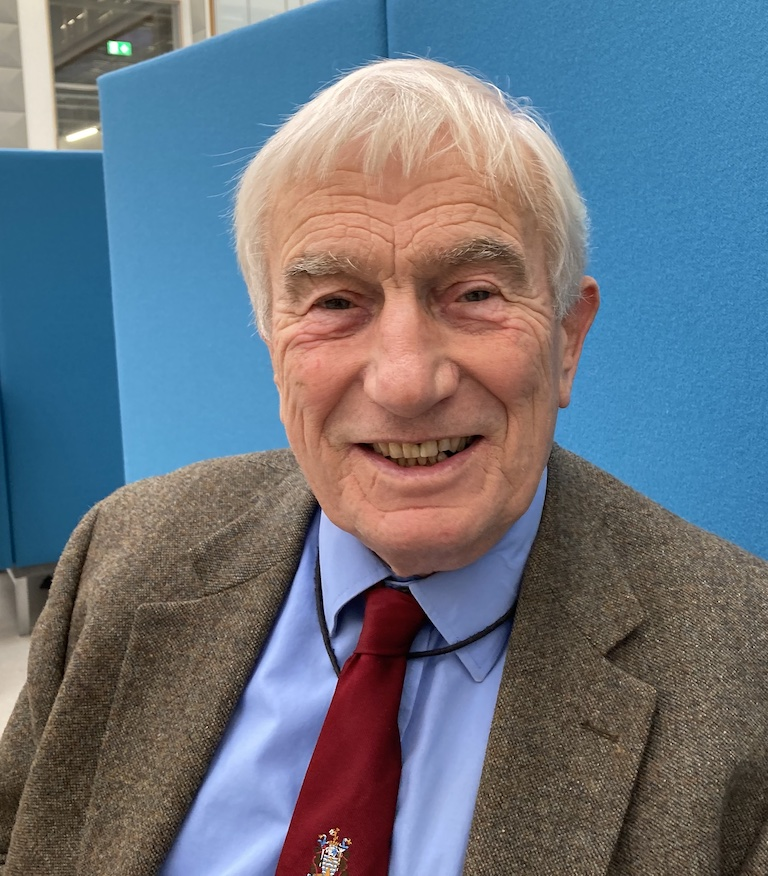
Channon in 2021

Robert Derek Channon (born 15 June 1944) is a British engineer known for inventing an insulin pump for diabetics, and miniaturized helicopters for the UK military. A diabetic himself, Channon developed the three ounce insulin pump to replace his own regular insulin injections. The National Medical Research Foundation awarded Channon £26,000 to develop the pump. In 1980, the National Medical Research Foundation awarded Guy's Hospital £40,000 to test Channon's pump in people with diabetes. The trial, under the supervision of Harry Keen, tested whether using the pump reduced the development of blindness in 30 people with diabetes.

In July 2024 Channon was awarded an honorary Doctor of Engineering degree, by UWE Bristol, in recognition of his contribution to the management of type 1 diabetes.

== The insulin infusion pump and related inventions ==
In 1978 Channon was referred to Professor Harry Keen, a diabetes specialist at Guy's Hospital, who took him on as a patient. During a consultation Professor Keen suggested that Channon might benefit from a portable continuous infusion syringe pump developed at Guy's. Channon quickly realised that the paperback-book sized device could be dramatically improved. Impressed by Channon's ideas and initial prototypes, Professor Keen and his colleague Dr Pickup wrote to the City of Bath Technical School, where Channon was at the time a lecturer, requesting he be seconded to Guy's hospital to work on the clinical evaluation of his prototype.

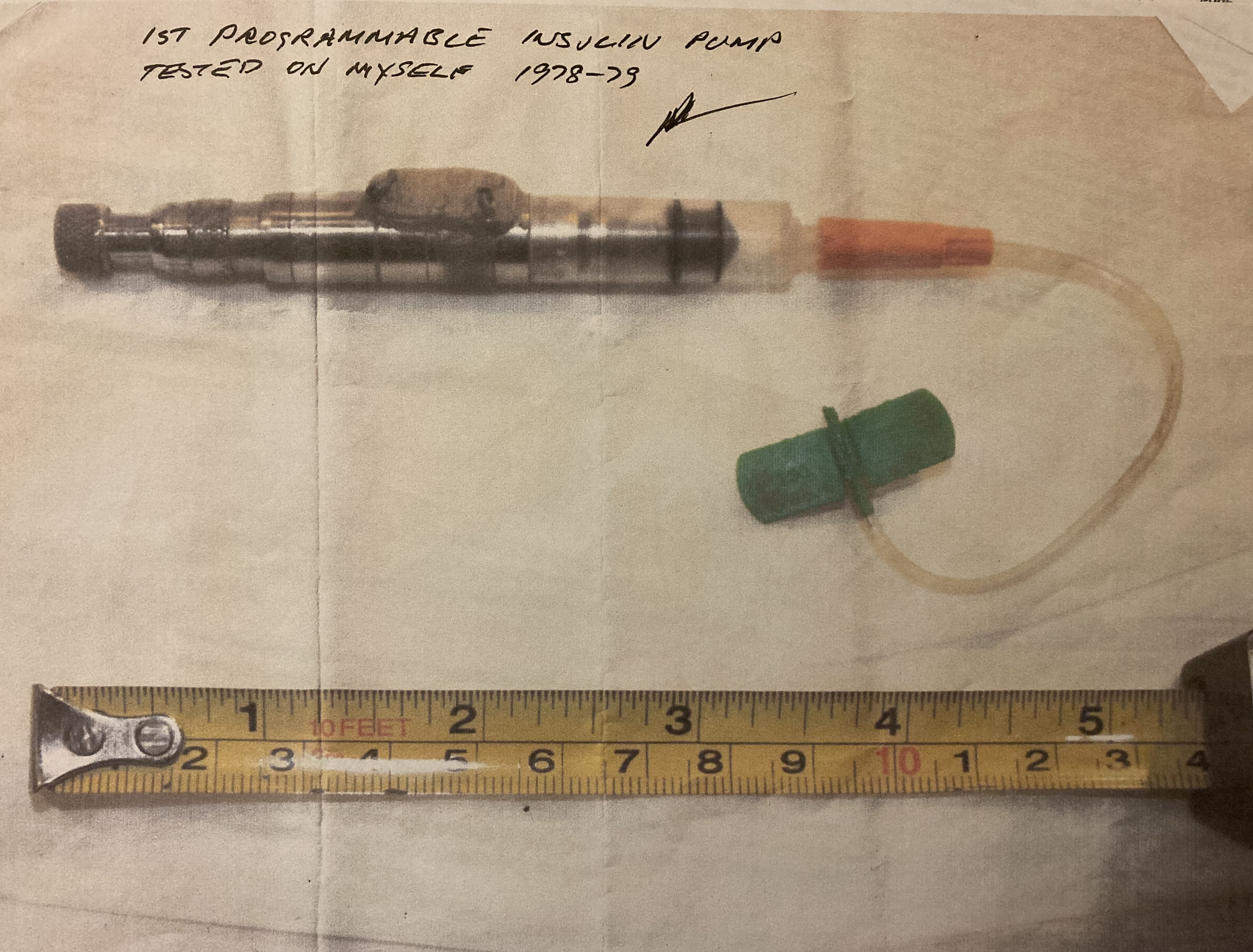
Image of the first prototype Insulin Infusion Pump designed, fabricated and self-tested by Channon in 1978–79.

Between 1978 and 1979 Channon designed and fabricated an insulin pump driven by a small compression spring with a programmable bore to allow different rates of insulin infusion. Channon tested this device on himself in what is believed to be the first time a background bolus regime was used to treat an insulin dependent diabetic. The device is now part of the Bristol Museums Collection.

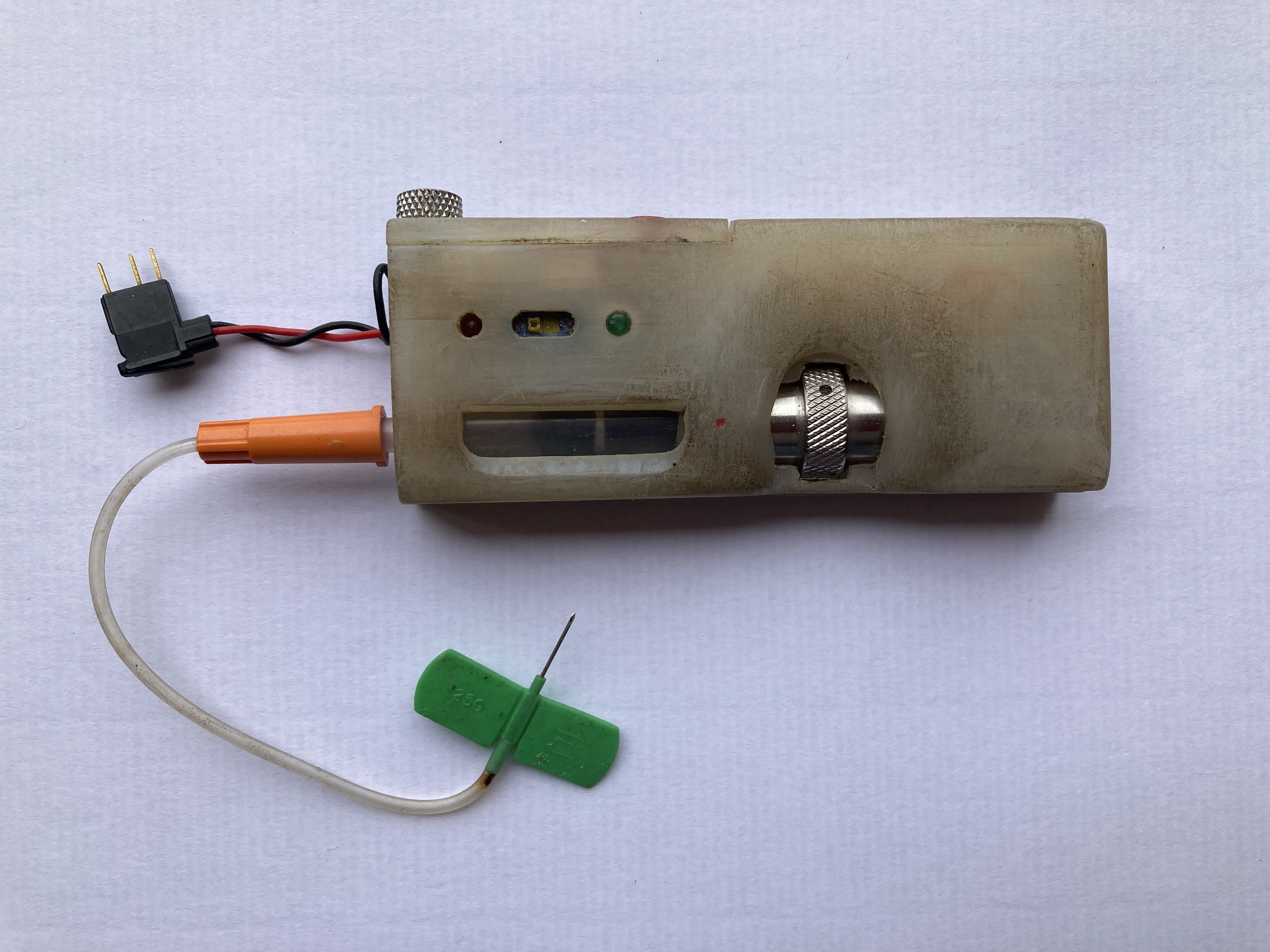
Channon's compact battery-powered motorised insulin infusion pump.

With the support of two National Medical Research fund (now WellChild) grants - £26,000 to Channon to fund his secondment and £40,000 to Guy's to support the clinical evaluation - Channon developed a compact insulin infusion pump "no larger than a pocket cigarette lighter" and weighing just three ounces. The pump could be set to a 3-stage decaying programme, which automatically delivered 3 infusions during the day with a successively lower dose on the 2nd and 3rd. In addition the user could manually operate the device when required to cope with the additional insulin required when eating a meal.

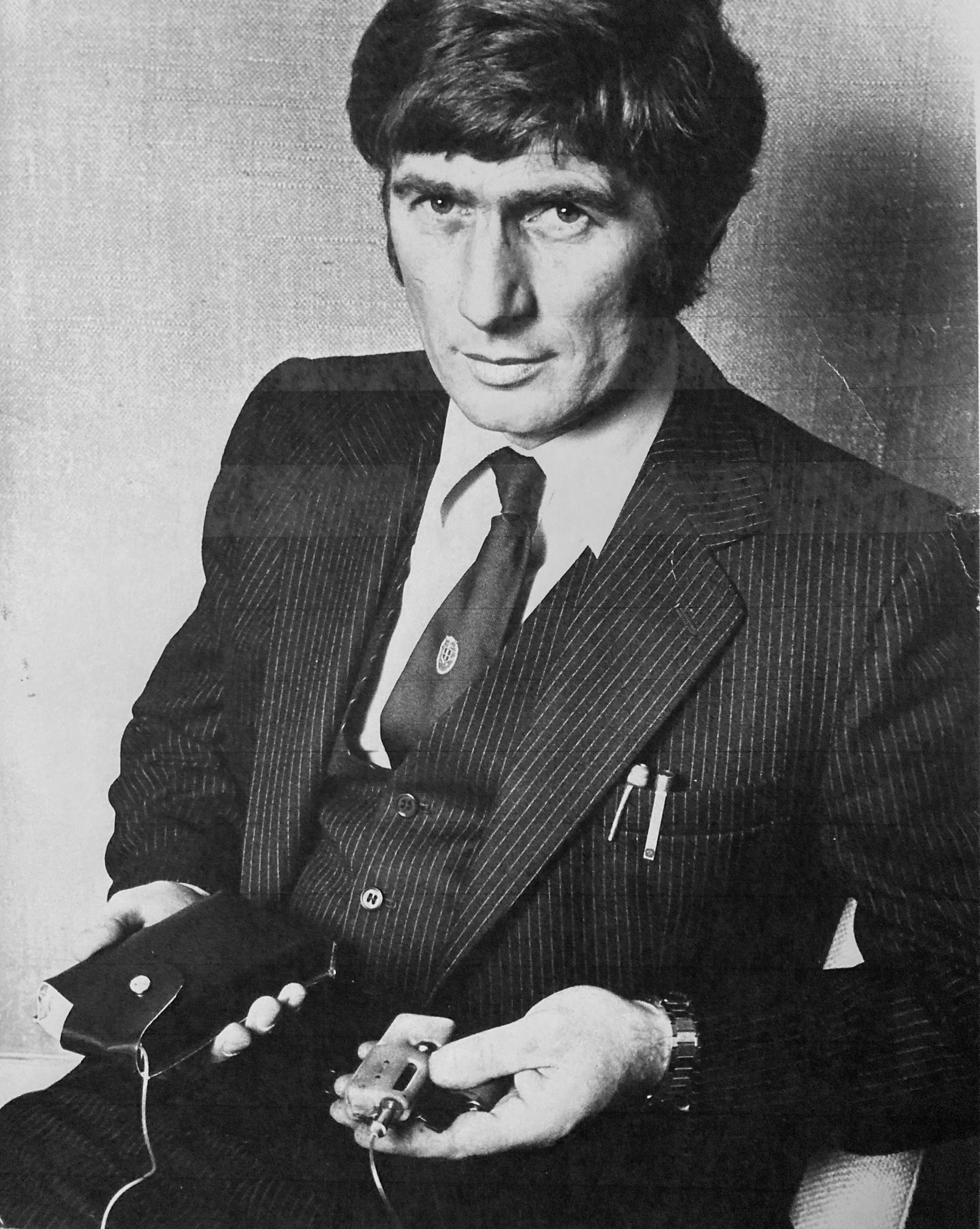
Robert Channon pictured in February 1981. In his left hand Channon holds his compact battery-powered insulin infusion pump. In his right hand he holds the Mill Hill infuser designed by Dr John Pickup and trialled at Guy's hospital.

Channon's work received national, regional and professional coverage including articles in the Times, the Telegraph, New Scientist and the bulletin of the Institute of Marine Engineers. In 1981 the work was featured in the national magazine of Diabetes UK.

Following a suggestion by Professor Keen, Channon also developed a 5ml syringe with a precision engineered mechanism for delivering doses of insulin with an audible and tactile click on each rotation of a knurled thimble, for use by blind and deaf-blind diabetics. The dosage could be varied simply by increasing, or decreasing, the number of clicks given at each injection. Channon named this device the Multiject.

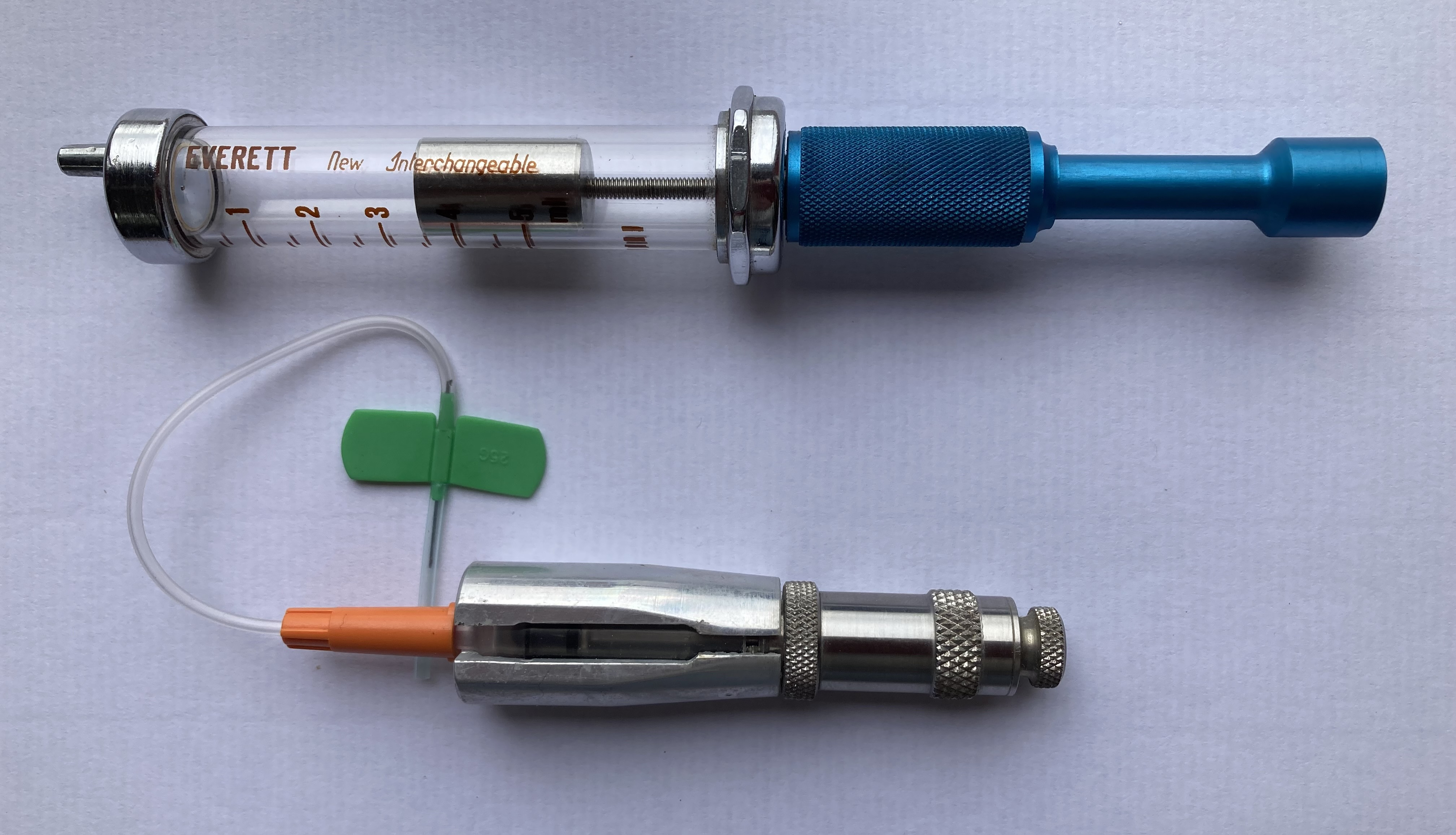
Upper: The Multiject designed for blind diabetics to self-administer precise doses of insulin. Lower: The Portaject wearable insulin infusion pump, shown with cannula attached.

In 1981 Channon left Guy's Hospital to continue his work with Drs Martin Hartog and Richard Paisey at the Bristol Royal Infirmary. Channon then developed the miniature Portaject device. Unlike the Multiject the Portaject is designed to be worn. It has the capacity for sufficient insulin for 24 hours (at the time insulin had to be refrigerated; at room or body temperature it would become unusable after 24 hours). Channon self-funded the design and fabrication work through his company Channon Medical Ltd. He filed a patent for the Portaject in 1988 but subsequently withdrew the application, choosing instead to donate his research to the field.

Clinical trials at the BRI were supported by a small grant of £4,500 from the National Medical Research fund. Dr Hartog attests that "Portaject was the first device that allowed convenient repeated subcutaneous injections of insulin and led to the Novopen. Administration of insulin in this way resulted in a much improved control of the patient's diabetes and, consequently, to a considerably improved prognosis overall". Dr Paisey recalls that clinical trials were conducted with 20 patients and that "one of them continued for 20 years with the same device and achieved good glycemic control. He also designed and manufactured a belt to house the pump". Another long term user, Stephen Dixon, wrote to Channon "Thanks so much for doing what you did. You truly helped transform millions of lives, including mine".

In 1989 Channon developed a simple device for protecting, lubricating and sterilizing a hypodermic needle.

== Other Inventions ==
The Nitrohawk Rotary Unmanned Air Vehicle

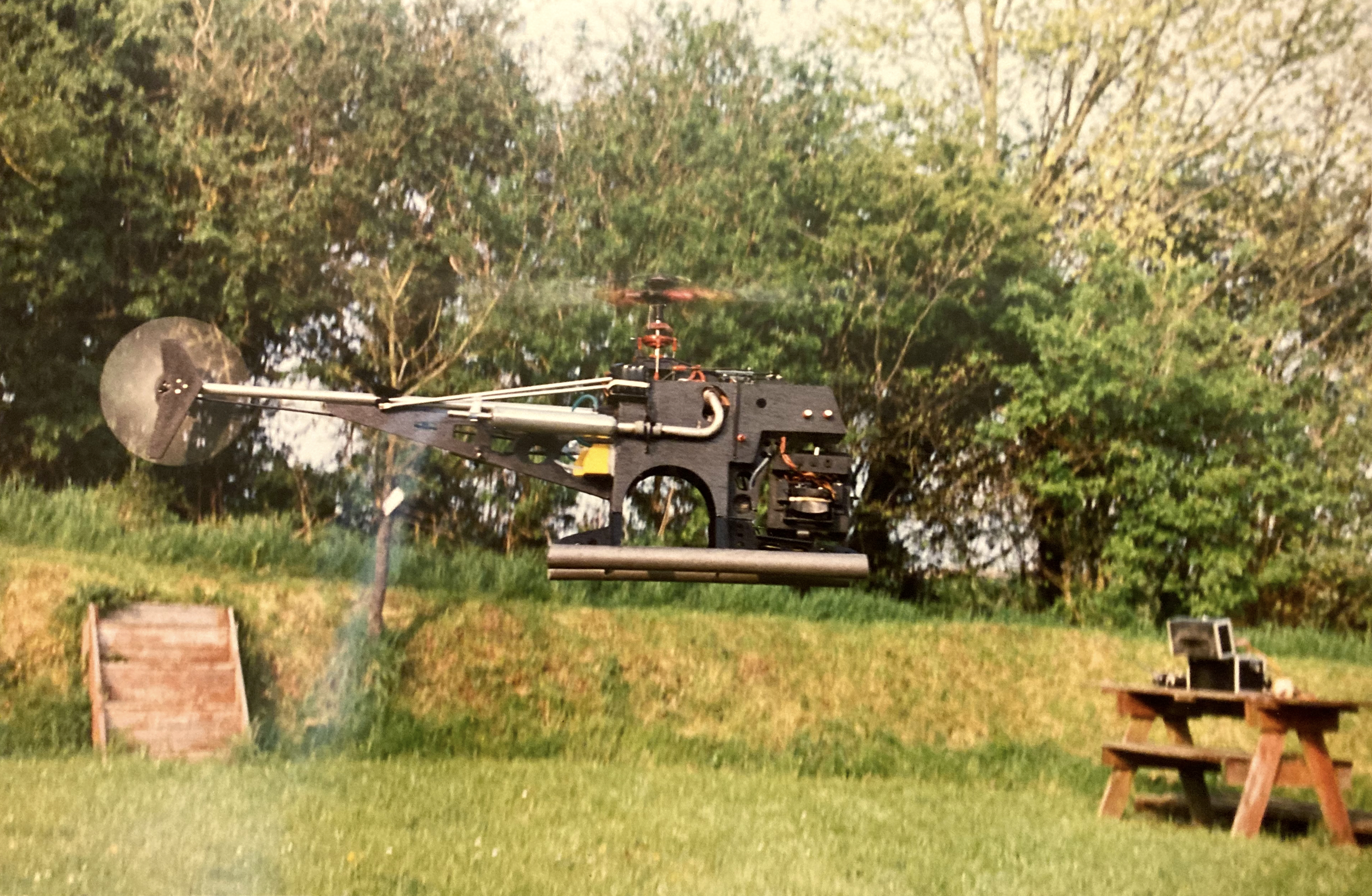
The Nitrohawk high performance unmanned air vehicle designed, built and flown by Channon.

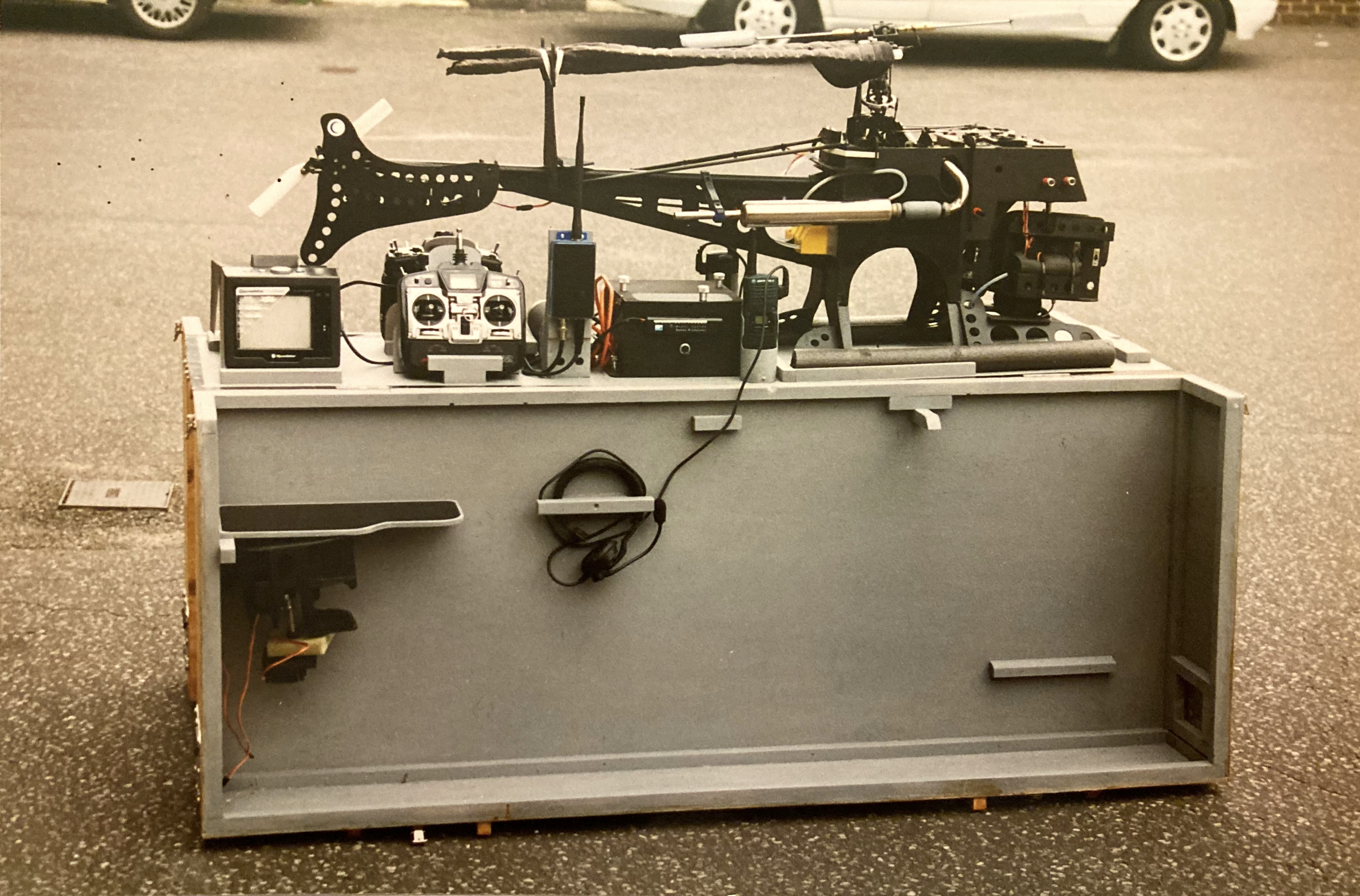
Nitrohawk with its travel case

Over a ten-year period between 1988 and 1998 Channon developed a high performance radio controlled helicopter suitable for a variety of professional uses including surveillance, environmental monitoring and aerial photography. Nitrohawk was equipped with a broadcast quality digital camera with pan/tilt and 20x zoom. A novel gyroscopic stabilization system designed by Channon allowed the vehicle to hover in place without constant attention by the pilot, and allowing high resolution images to be captured or transmitted live without motion blur; performance that was state of the art in the mid-1990s. A Nitrohawk was acquired to assist with stunt filming in the movie Skyfall.

Animal warning system for road vehicles

In 1999 Channon developed an ultrasonic device that can be attached to road vehicles, with the aim of cutting the number of wild animals killed on roads. Channon noticed that while driving across Exmoor in his turbo charged car he didn't hit any animals at all until one occasion when his car's turbo charger failed. He deduced that the high-pitched whine of the turbo charger must be giving an early warning to animals and reproduced the same effect with a simple ultrasonic device.
