= Lipoprotein Insulin Resistance Index =

Blood test measuring insulin resistance

The Lipoprotein Insulin Resistance Index (LP-IR) test is a blood test that measures insulin resistance using a composite score derived from lipoprotein particle sizes and concentrations. It is performed using nuclear magnetic resonance (NMR) spectroscopy, which analyzes six specific lipoprotein parameters in a blood sample:

- Large very-low-density lipoprotein particles (VLDL-P)
- Small low-density lipoprotein particles (LDL-P)
- Large high-density lipoprotein particles (HDL-P)
- VLDL size
- LDL size
- HDL size

These markers assess lipid metabolism linked to insulin resistance, in which cells respond poorly to insulin, often preceding type 2 diabetes and cardiovascular disease. Multiple studies, reported that it predicts future type 2 diabetes risk effectively, even outperforming traditional markers like fasting glucose in some cases. The LP-IR score offers early detection of insulin resistance, even in people with normal blood glucose, making it useful for preventive health strategies. It is simple, affordable, and doesn't require insulin or glucose measurements, avoiding issues with insulin assay variability.

== Scoring ==
The LP-IR score ranges from 0 (most insulin-sensitive) to 100 (most insulin-resistant). It's calculated by weighting the six parameters, which are more strongly correlated with insulin resistance than individual lipid measures like triglycerides or HDL cholesterol alone.

Results are typically categorized:

- <50: Low insulin resistance
- 50-80: Intermediate
- >80: High

== Procedure ==
The test uses a single fasting blood sample, typically collected in a tube such as an NMR LipoTube or a standard red-top tube, and is processed by commercial laboratories. It's often part of a broader NMR LipoProfile, which also assesses cardiovascular risk through lipoprotein particle numbers (e.g., LDL-P).
