= Injection port =

Medical device

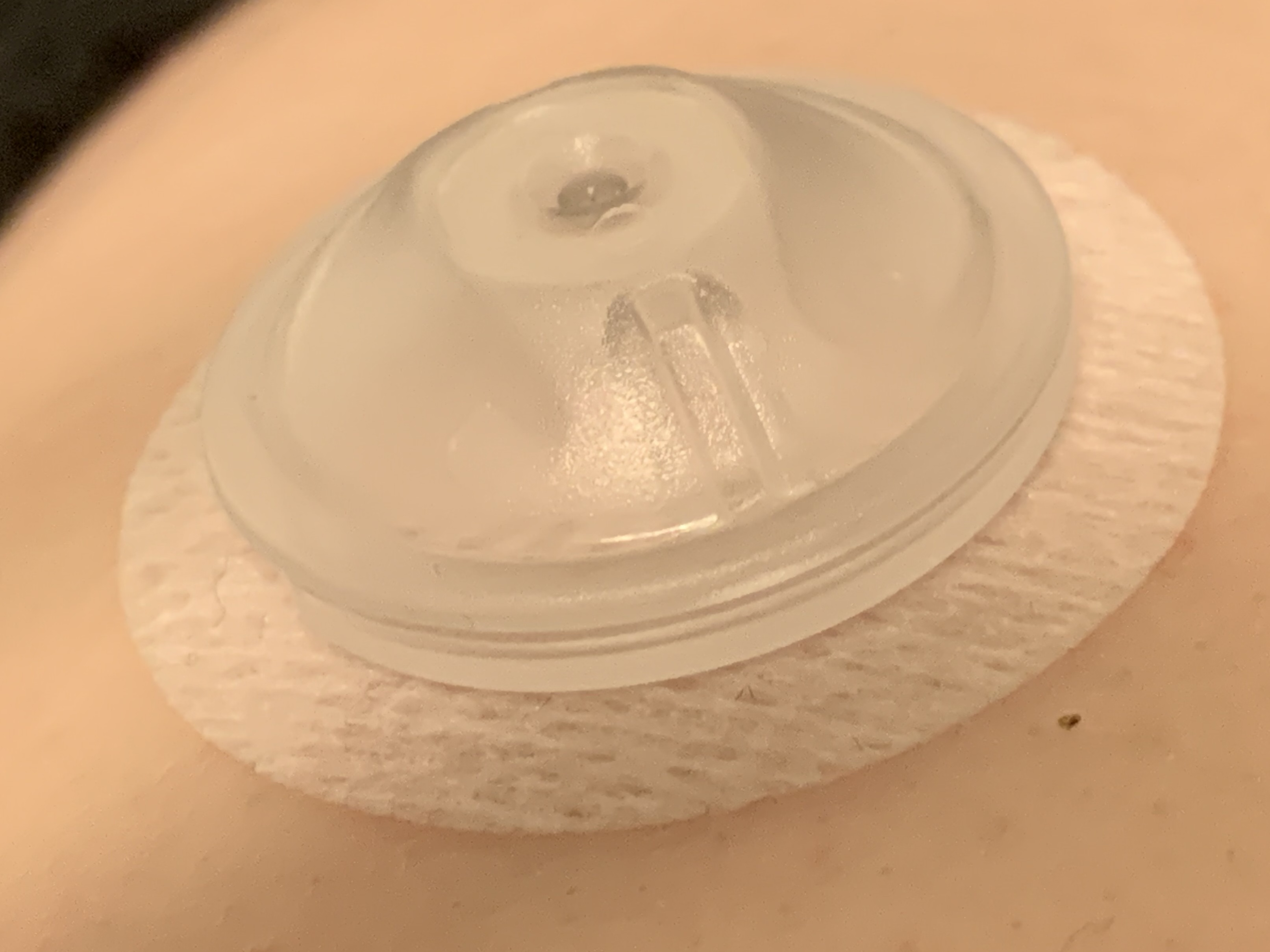
Medtronic's I-Port Advance attached to the skin. Credit: Marius Vassnes

An injection port is a medical device used for the administration of insulin or other physician-approved medicine into the subcutaneous tissue (the tissue layer just below the skin). The device is similar to infusion sets used by insulin pumps, except it is configured to receive a syringe instead of a tubing system. An injection port is usually a disposable device applied by the patient and worn for period of 3–5 days. When giving shots via an injection port, the needle stays above the surface of the skin Medication is delivered via a short soft cannula. An injection port can be used in conjunction with multiple daily injections of insulin by people with diabetes. It can also be used for the subcutaneous administration of any other physician prescribed medication.

== Applying, wearing and using ==
Injection ports are usually applied by the patient. The device comes with a needle surrounded by a soft cannula. The needle and cannula are manually inserted into the patient's tissue. Immediately after insertion the needle is removed and the cannula remains below the surface of the skin.

Ports are usually worn on the abdomen, but can also be worn on other areas such as the buttocks, thigh or arm. Typical injection ports are worn for 3 days and then replaced with another port.

Insulin is injected via a syringe into the injection port. Medication immediately flows through the device's cannula into the subcutaneous tissue layer. No medication is stored in the device (other than the small amount of dead-space in the medication channel within the device).

== Advantages ==
- Reduces skin punctures
- Reduces fear and anxiety associated with multiple daily injections
- Reduces bruising around injection site
- Viable alternative to standard injections

== Disadvantages ==
- Injection ports must be obtained in addition to syringes and medication
- Ports are sometimes not covered by insurance
- Patient still has to administer shots

== Models ==
=== Insuflon ===
The Insuflon, manufactured and distributed by Unomedical, is inserted at a 20-45° angle and rests flush against the skin similar to an IV.

=== I-Port ===
The I-Port, manufactured and distributed by Patton Medical Devices, is a domed shaped device with a cannula inserted at a 90° angle. The i-port Advance combines an i-port with an insertion device.
