= Harry Keen =

English diabetologist

Harry Keen CBE (3 September 1925 – 5 April 2013) was an English diabetologist and a professor of human metabolism at Guy's Hospital. He was the first to identify microalbuminuria as a predictor of kidney disease in diabetics, and was an international authority on diabetes.

== Early life ==
Keen was born in 1925 in London to a Jewish family; his parents were Sydney Keen, a tailor, and Esther (née Zenober), a teacher who had migrated to the United Kingdom from Poland. He attended St Ann's School in Hanwell and Ealing County Grammar School for Boys. He studied medicine at St Mary's Hospital Medical School, graduating on 5 July 1948, the day that the National Health Service (NHS) was established.

== Career ==
Keen began his medical career as a house officer at London's West Middlesex Hospital in 1948–49. He then enlisted in the Royal Army Medical Corps, serving for two years in Suez, Egypt. He returned to London in 1951, taking up a post at St Mary's Hospital under George Pickering. Keen assisted Pickering over several years on a large project studying hypertension in patients with diabetes and their first-degree relatives. In 1953, he began collaborating with Robert Daniel Lawrence, who headed the diabetes clinic at King's College Hospital, and spent seven years there studying diabetes and its long-term complications. He travelled to Bethesda, Maryland, in 1960 for a year-long research fellowship at the National Institutes of Health, where he experimented with insulin assays and early attempts to isolate pancreatic islets.

When Keen returned to London from the United States in 1961, he was hired as a lecturer by Guy's Hospital and its associated medical school, where he would spend the rest of his career. In 1962, he conducted the Bedford Survey, in which every adult in Bedford was asked to provide a urine sample in order to study the population prevalence of diabetes; around 70% of the population provided samples, and 250 participants were found to have undiagnosed diabetes as a result. The study led to the first definition of prediabetes, which Keen called "borderline diabetes", and demonstrated the relationship between glucose intolerance and cardiovascular disease at a population level. He and his colleagues became the first, in 1964, to show that trace amounts of the protein albumin in urine could predict kidney disease in diabetes, which is now the basis for routine kidney screening in diabetic patients. With the London School of Hygiene & Tropical Medicine, he conducted the Whitehall Survey in 1969, which led to the creation of different glucose thresholds for microvascular and macrovascular disease. He also pioneered the concept of the insulin pump, which delivers insulin continuously to type 1 diabetics who are reliant on insulin. In 1971, he was appointed professor of human metabolism at Guy's. He established one of the UK's first diabetes centres at Guy's Hospital.

Keen chaired the 1980 and 1985 World Health Organization expert committees on diabetes. He was involved in the St. Vincent Declaration of 1989, which set international goals and benchmarks for diabetes care. He retired from medicine in 1990, becoming professor emeritus at King's College London.

== Awards and honours ==
Keen chaired the British Diabetic Association between 1990 and 1996 and was appointed honorary president of the International Diabetes Federation in 1991. He was awarded a CBE and the first United Nations/UNESCO Hellmut Mehnert Award for the Prevention of Diabetes and its Complications in 1998. He received the American Diabetes Association's Kelly M. West Award for Outstanding Achievement in Epidemiology and Harold Rifkin Award for Distinguished International Service in the Cause of Diabetes in 1989 and 1992 respectively.

== Personal life ==
Keen married Anna "Nan" Miliband, the sister of sociologist Ralph Miliband, in 1953; they had a son and a daughter. He was an uncle by marriage to Labour politicians Ed Miliband and David Miliband. He died on 5 April 2013.
