= Cortisol awakening response =

Physiological response

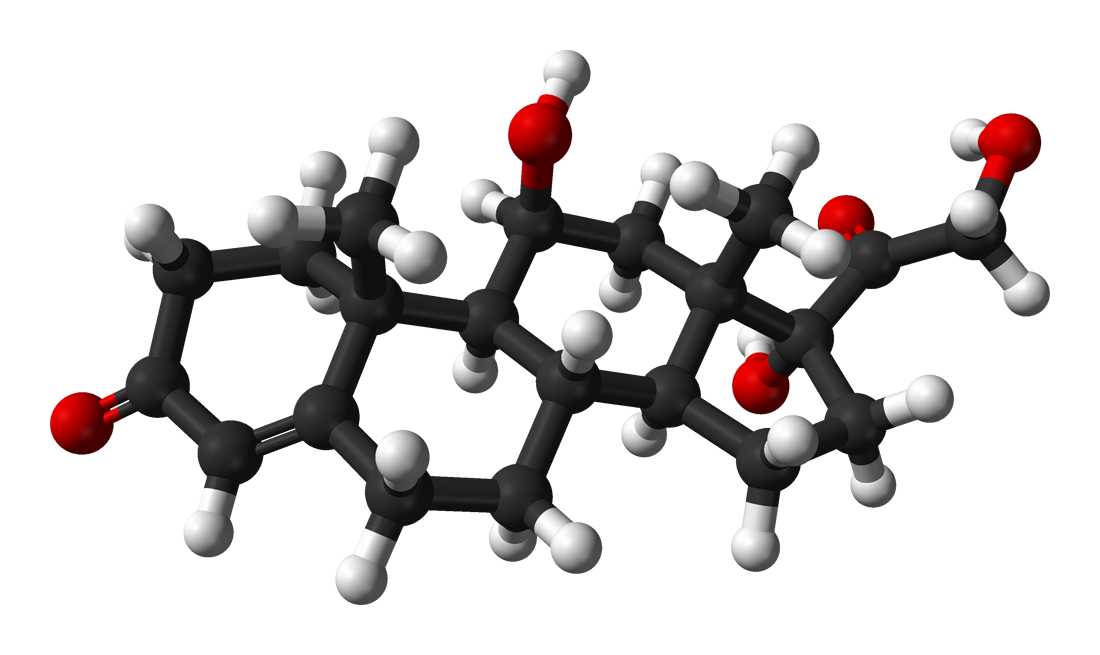
Production of the corticosteroid hormone cortisol is increased after a person awakes in the morning

The cortisol awakening response (CAR) is an increase between 38% and 75% in cortisol levels peaking 30–45 minutes after awakening in the morning in some people. This rise is superimposed upon the late-night rise in cortisol which occurs before awakening. While its purpose is uncertain, it may be linked to the hippocampus' preparation of the hypothalamic-pituitary-adrenal axis (HPA) in order to face anticipated stress. Other research has challenged the idea that this elevation in morning cortisol is specifically linked to the onset of waking.

== Description ==
Shortly after awakening, a sharp 38–75% (average 50%) increase occurs in the blood level of cortisol in about 77% of healthy people of all ages. The average level of salivary cortisol upon waking is roughly 15 nmol/L; 30 minutes later it may be 23 nmol/L, though there are wide variations. The cortisol awakening response reaches a maximum approximately 30 minutes after awakening though it may still be heightened by 34% an hour after waking. The pattern of this response to waking is relatively stable for any individual. Twin studies show its pattern is largely genetically determined since there is a heritability of 0.40 for the mean cortisol increase after awakening and 0.48 for the area under the cortisol rise curve.

Normally, the highest cortisol secretion happens in the second half of the night with peak cortisol production occurring in the early morning. Following this, cortisol levels decline throughout the day with lowest levels during the first half of the night. Cortisol awakening response is independent of this circadian variation in HPA axis activity; it is superimposed upon the daily rhythm of HPA axis activity, and it seems to be linked specifically to the event of awakening.

Cortisol awakening response provides an easy measure of the reactivity capacity of the HPA axis.

== Sleep factors ==
- Waking up earlier in the morning increases the response.
- Shift work: nurses working on morning shifts with very early awakening (between 4:00–5:30 a.m.) had a greater and prolonged cortisol awakening response than those on the late day shift (between 6:00–9:00 a.m.) or the night shift (between 11:00 a.m.–2:00 p.m.). However another study found that this greater response could be attributed to increased stress and impaired sleep quality before an early work shift ("when these factors were taken into account, the difference in CAR related to experimental condition was no longer significant").
- Naps: students taking a nap of one to two hours in the early evening hours (between 6:45–8:30 p.m.) had no cortisol awakening response, suggesting cortisol awakening response only occurs after night sleep.
- Waking up in the light: cortisol awakening response is larger when people wake up in light rather than darkness.
- Noise: there is no cortisol rise after nights with traffic-like low-frequency noise.
- Alarm clock vs. spontaneous waking: there is no difference on days when people woke up spontaneously or used the alarm clock.
- Aspirin has been found to reduce the response probably through an action upon ACTH.

== Individual factors ==
- Morning types show a larger cortisol awakening response than evening types.
- Those with fatigue show a low rise and flat plateau.
- Those in pain: the response is reduced the more people are in pain.
- The lower a person's socioeconomic status, the higher their response. This might link to the material hardship that occurs with low socioeconomic status.

== Stress ==
Cortisol awakening response is larger for those:

- Waking up to a working day compared to work-free weekend day.
- Experiencing chronic stress and worry.
- Overloaded with work.
- In acute stress. People taking part in a competitive ballroom dance tournament had an increased cortisol awakening response on the morning of their competition day but not their non-competition one.
- Worn down by burnout: some studies find an increased response, though other researchers find a decreased or normal response.

== Neurology ==
Cortisol is released from the adrenal glands following activation by ACTH release from the pituitary. The ACTH release creating the cortisol awakening response is strongly inhibited after intake of a low-dose dexamethasone. This is a synthetic glucocorticoid and this inhibition allows the detection of the presence of negative feedback from circulating cortisol that controls to ACTH-secreting cells of the pituitary.

In the hypothalamic-pituitary-adrenal axis the pituitary release of ACTH is regulated by the hypothalamus. This occurs through the hypothalamus's production of the hypophysiotropic hormone corticotropin-releasing hormone, the production of which is subject to circadian influence and the day/night cycle. In the cortisol awakening response, the hypothalamic-pituitary-adrenal axis is controlled by the hippocampus. For example, cortisol awakening response is absent in those with bilateral and unilateral hippocampus damage and hippocampal atrophy. Those with severe amnesia, and thus with presumed damage to the temporal lobe, also do not have it. Those with a larger hippocampus have a greater response.

It's plausible also that the suprachiasmatic nucleus, the light-sensitive biological clock, plays a role in cortisol awakening response regulation.

== Function ==
The function of cortisol awakening response is unknown but it has been suggested to link with a stress-related preparation in regard to the upcoming day by the hippocampus. One hypothesis is: "that the cortisol rise after awakening may accompany an activation of prospective memory representations at awakening enabling individual's orientation about the self in time and space as well as anticipation of demands of the upcoming day... it is tempting to speculate that for the CAR, anticipation of these upcoming demands may be essential in regulating the CAR magnitude for the particular day. The hippocampus is, besides its established role in long-term memory consolidation, involved in the formation of a cohesive construct and representation of the outside world within the central nervous system processing information about space, time and relationships of environmental cues. This puts the hippocampus in a pivotal position for the regulation of the CAR."

== See also ==
- Dawn phenomenon
- Hypothalamic-pituitary-adrenal axis
- Sleep
