= Insulin pump =

Medical device to administer insulin for diabetics

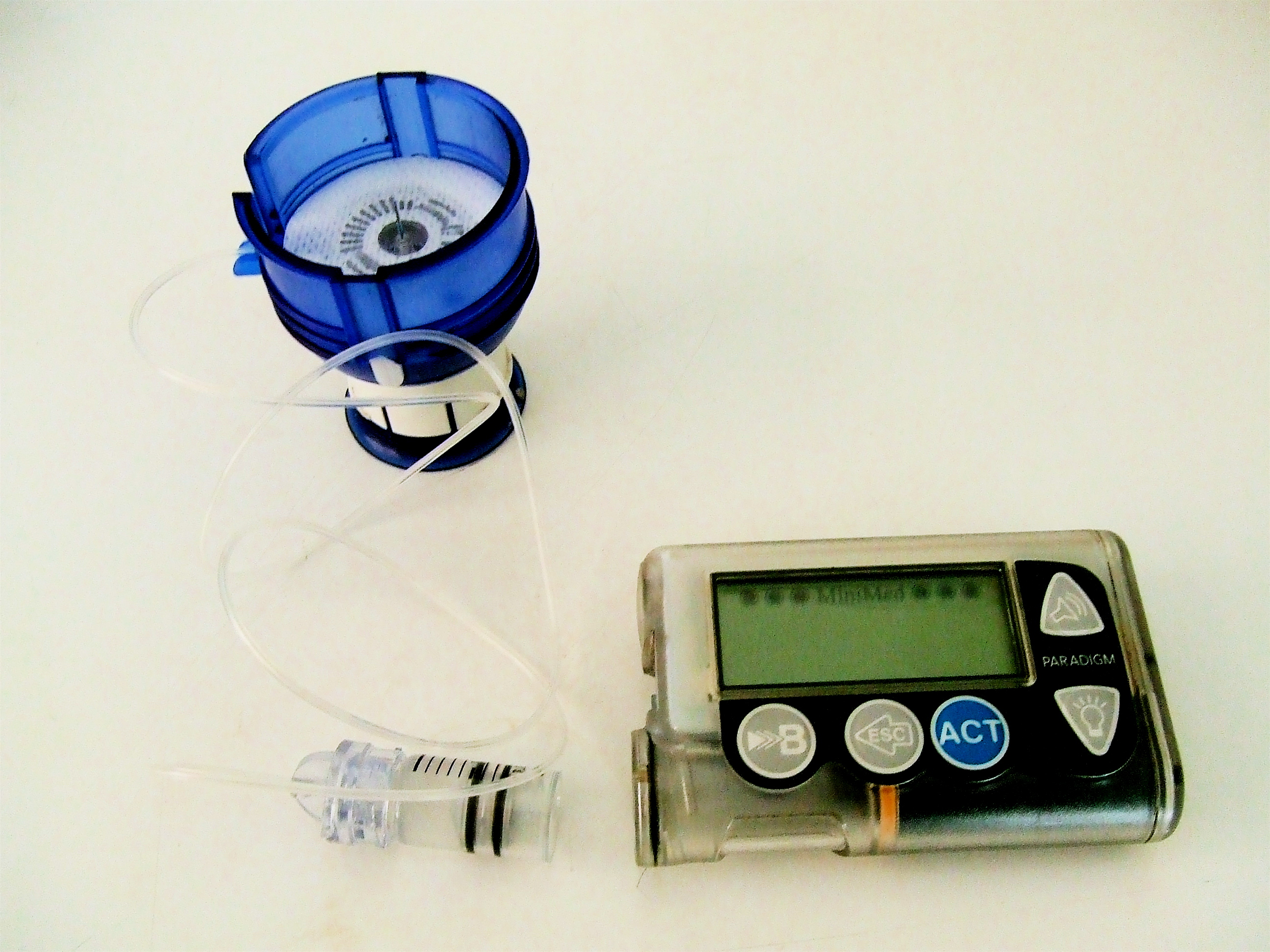
- Paradigm insulin pump 530g, showing an infusion set loaded into spring-loaded insertion device called serter. A reservoir is attached to the infusion set (shown here removed from the pump).

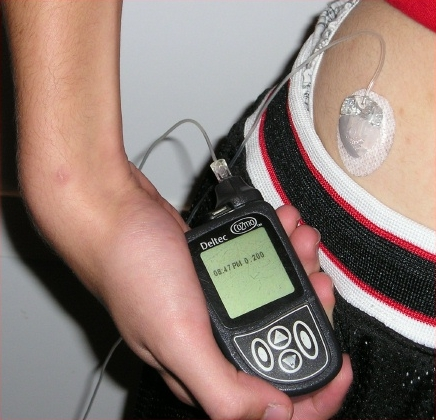
Insulin pump in use.

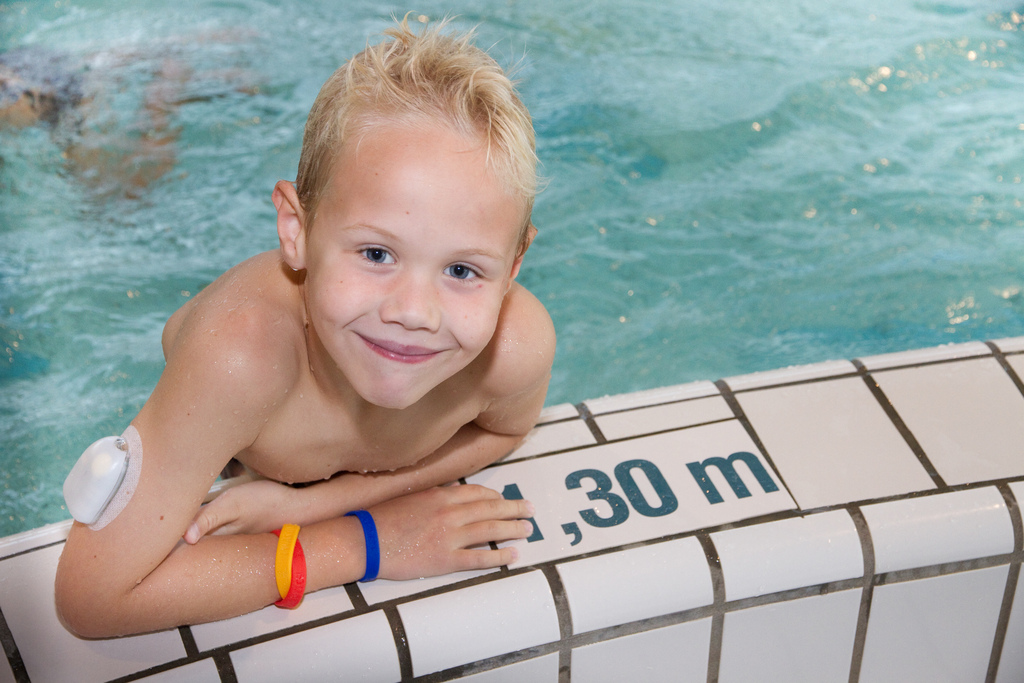
Diabetic child wearing a "patch pump" (brand name Omnipod). His waterproof device does not need an infusion set.

An insulin pump is a medical device used for the administration of insulin in the treatment of diabetes mellitus, also known as continuous subcutaneous insulin therapy (CSII = Continuous Subcutaneous Insulin Infusion). The device configuration may vary depending on design. A traditional pump includes:

- the pump (including controls, processing module, and batteries)
- a disposable reservoir for insulin (inside the pump)
- a disposable infusion set, including a cannula for subcutaneous insertion (under the skin) and a tubing system to connect the insulin reservoir to the cannula.

Other configurations are possible. More recent models may include disposable or semi-disposable designs for the pumping mechanism and may eliminate tubing from the infusion set.

An insulin pump is an alternative to multiple daily injections of insulin by insulin syringes or an insulin pen and allows for flexible insulin therapy when used in conjunction with blood glucose monitoring and carbohydrate counting.

== Medical uses ==
Insulin pumps are used to deliver insulin on a continuous basis to a person with type I diabetes.

=== Advantages ===
- Users report better quality of life (QOL) compared to using other devices for administering insulin. The improvement in QOL is reported in type 1 and insulin-requiring type 2 diabetes subjects on pumps.
- The use of rapid-acting insulin for basal needs offers relative freedom from a structured meal and exercise regime previously needed to control blood sugar with slow-acting insulin.
- Programmable basal rates allow for scheduled insulin deliveries of varying amounts at different times of the day. This is especially useful in controlling events such as the dawn phenomenon resulting in fewer and less severe low blood sugar events during the night.
- Many users feel that bolusing insulin from a pump is more convenient and discreet than injection.
- Insulin pumps make it possible to deliver more precise amounts of insulin than can be injected using a syringe. This supports tighter control over blood sugar and hemoglobin A1c levels, reducing the chance of long-term complications associated with diabetes. This is predicted to result in a long-term cost savings relative to multiple daily injections.
- Many modern insulin pumps have a "bolus wizard" that calculates how much bolus insulin is needed, taking into account expected carbohydrate intake, blood sugar level, and still-active insulin.
- Insulin pumps can provide a record of insulin usage through their history menus. On many insulin pumps, this history can be uploaded to a computer and graphed for trend analysis.
- Neuropathy is a troublesome complication of diabetes resistant to usual treatment. There are reports of alleviation or even total disappearance of resistant neuropathic pain with the use of insulin pumps.
- Recent studies of use of insulin pumps in Type 2 diabetes have shown profound improvements in HbA1c, sexual performance, and neuropathy pain.

=== Disadvantages ===
Insulin pumps, cartridges, and infusion sets may be far more expensive than syringes used for insulin injection with several insulin pumps costing more than $6,000; necessary supplies can cost over $300. Another disadvantage of insulin pump use is a higher risk of developing diabetic ketoacidosis if the pump malfunctions. This can happen if the pump battery is discharged, if the insulin is inactivated by heat exposure, if the insulin reservoir runs empty, the tubing becomes loose and insulin leaks rather than being injected, or if the cannula becomes bent or kinked in the body, preventing delivery. Therefore, pump users typically monitor their blood sugars more frequently to evaluate the effectiveness of insulin delivery.

- Since the insulin pump needs to be worn most of the time, pump users need strategies to participate in activities that may damage the pump, such as rough sports and activities in the water. Some users may find that wearing the pump all the time (together with the infusion set tubing) is uncomfortable or unwieldy.
- Possibility of insulin pump malfunctioning, and having to resort back to multiple daily injections until a replacement becomes available. However most pump manufacturers will have a program that will get a new pump to the user within 24 hours or allow the user to buy a second pump as a backup for a small fee.
- Users may experience scar tissue buildup around the inserted cannula, resulting in a hard bump under the skin after the cannula is removed. The scar tissue does not heal particularly fast, so years of wearing the pump and changing the infusion site will cause the user to start running out of viable "spots" to wear the pump. In addition, the areas with scar tissue buildup generally have lower insulin sensitivity and may affect basal rates and bolus amounts. In some extreme cases the insulin delivery will appear to have no/little effect on lowering blood glucose levels and the site must be changed.
- Users may experience allergic reactions and other skin irritation from the adhesive on the back of an infusion set. Experience may vary according to the individual, the pump manufacturer, and the type of infusion set used.
- A larger supply of insulin may be required in order to use the pump. Many units of insulin can be wasted while refilling the pump's reservoir, filling the tubing, or changing an infusion site. This may affect prescription and dosage information.
- In February 2025 the FDA alerted patients of a safety concern of insulin that rely on a smartphone to deliver critical safety alerts, because reports showed that people were missing alerts due to technology configuration issues.
- When flying in airplanes the cabin pressure changes can cause under- or over-delivery of insulin in certain pumps, putting insulin pump users at risk of unexpected hypoglycemia or hyperglycemia.

=== Accessibility ===
Use of insulin pumps is increasing because of:

- Easy delivery of multiple insulin injections for those using intensive insulin therapy.
- Accurate delivery of very small boluses, helpful for infants.
- Growing support among doctors and insurance companies due to the benefits contributing to reducing the incidence of long-term complications.
- Improvements in blood glucose monitoring. New meters require smaller drops of blood, and the corresponding lancet poke in the fingers is smaller and less painful. These meters also support alternate site testing for the most routine tests for practically painless testing.

== History ==
In the early 1960s, Dr. Arnold Kadish, a physician working at Loma Linda University, developed a closed-loop device for blood glucose control using a double-lumen autoanalyzer to measure blood glucose linked to an intravenous insulin infusion pump. Although it worked, the prototype was considered so bulky, worn as a backpack, and complicated, that it was never commercialized. In 1976, the first commercialized insulin pump was created and was named the Biostator. The pump was a 60 kg bedside device. It also had the capability of monitoring blood glucose levels, so this also doubles as the first continuous glucose monitor. Between 1978 and 1988, Robert Channon, working with Guy's Hospital and the Bristol Royal Infirmary, developed a series of miniature insulin infusion pumps. Today, insulin pumps are so small that they can fit in a pocket or a purse.

In the late 1970s and early 1980s, Sandia National Laboratories and the University of New Mexico School of Medicine developed a remotely programmable implantable insulin infusion system that was tested in animals and implanted in human patients beginning in 1981.

In 1984, an Infusaid implantable infusion device was used to treat a 22-year-old patient successfully.

The insulin pump was first endorsed in the United Kingdom in 2003 by the National Institute for Health and Care Excellence (NICE).

=== Sandia National Laboratories and implantable insulin pump development ===
In parallel with early academic and commercial efforts, significant development of implantable insulin delivery systems was carried out at Sandia National Laboratories in collaboration with the University of New Mexico School of Medicine during the late 1970s and early 1980s. This work focused on the design of an electronically controlled, remotely programmable insulin infusion system intended to more closely replicate the physiological function of the human pancreas.

The Sandia–UNM system built upon earlier external insulin pumps and incorporated engineering approaches derived from high-reliability systems, including precise flow control and programmable delivery rates. The implantable device was tested in animal models and subsequently implanted in human patients beginning in January 1981, with additional implantations reported in early 1982.

Key engineering contributions to the system were made by a multidisciplinary team at Sandia, including Gary A. Carlson, Raymond E. Bair, John I. Gaona Jr., Jerry T. Love, and Ruben S. Urenda, who co-authored foundational technical reports describing the design and operation of the implantable, remotely programmable insulin infusion system.

Earlier engineering work on insulin delivery systems by members of the Sandia–UNM collaboration was also described in peer-reviewed literature, including analysis of system design considerations such as flow control, programmability, and reliability.

Related peer-reviewed clinical research documented the successful short-term implantation of a remotely programmable insulin delivery system in humans, reflecting the collaboration between Sandia engineers and University of New Mexico clinicians.

These efforts represent an important component of the early development of implantable insulin delivery systems, highlighting the role of U.S. national laboratories in advancing biomedical device technology alongside academic and commercial research.

=== Developments ===
New insulin pumps are becoming "smart" as new features are added to their design. These simplify the tasks involved in delivering an insulin bolus.

- Insulin on board: This calculation is based on the size of a bolus, the time elapsed since the completion of the bolus, and a programmable metabolic rate. The pump software will estimate the insulin remaining in the bloodstream and relay it to the user. This supports the process of performing a new bolus before the effects of the last bolus are complete and, thereby, helps prevent the user from overcompensating for high blood sugar with unnecessary correction boluses.
- Bolus calculators: Pump software helps by calculating the dose for the next insulin bolus. The user enters the grams of carbohydrates to be consumed, and the bolus "wizard" calculates the units of insulin needed. It adjusts for the most recent blood glucose level and the insulin on board, and then suggests the best insulin dose to the user to approve and deliver.
- Custom alarms: The pump can monitor for activities during specific times of day and alarm the user if an expected activity did not occur. Examples include a missed meal bolus, a missed blood glucose test, a new blood glucose test 15 minutes after a low blood glucose test, etc. The alarms are customized for each user.
- Touch bolus: For persons with visual impairments, this button on the pump can be used to bolus for insulin without using the display. This works with a system of beeps or vibrations to confirm the bolus parameters to the pump user. This feature is described as 'touch', 'audio', or 'easy' bolus depending on brand. The feature was first introduced in the mid- to late 1990s.
- Interface to personal computers: Since the late 1990s, most pumps can interface with personal computers for managing and documenting pump programming and/or to upload data from the pump. This simplifies record keeping and can be interfaced with diabetes management software.
- Integration with blood glucose meters: Blood glucose data can be manually entered into the pump to support the bolus wizard for calculation of the next insulin bolus. Some pumps support an interface between the insulin pump and a blood glucose meter, with either wired or radio frequency (RF) communication.
- Integration with continuous glucose monitoring systems: Some insulin pumps can be used as a display for interstitial glucose values obtained from a continuous glucose monitoring system or sensor.

=== Future developments ===
When insulin pump technology is combined with a continuous blood glucose monitoring system, the technology seems promising for real time control of the blood sugar level. Currently there are no mature algorithms to automatically control the insulin delivery based on feedback of the blood glucose level. When the loop is closed, the system may function as an artificial pancreas.

Insulin pumps are being used for infusing pramlintide (brand name Symlin, or synthetic amylin) with insulin for improved postprandial glycemic control compared to insulin alone. Dual hormone insulin pumps that infuse either insulin or glucagon. In event of hypoglycemia, the glucagon could be triggered to increase the blood glucose. This would be particularly valuable in a closed loop system under the control of a glucose sensor. The Artificial Pancreas, currently in clinical trials for FDA approval, is a recently developed device designed with this technology in mind.

Ultrafast insulins are insulins that are absorbed more quickly than the currently available Humalog, Novolog, and Apidra which have a peak at about 60 minutes could be administered. Faster insulin uptake would theoretically coordinate with meals better, and allow faster recovery from hyperglycemia if the insulin infusion is suspended. Biodel is developing an ultrafast insulin

== Dosing ==
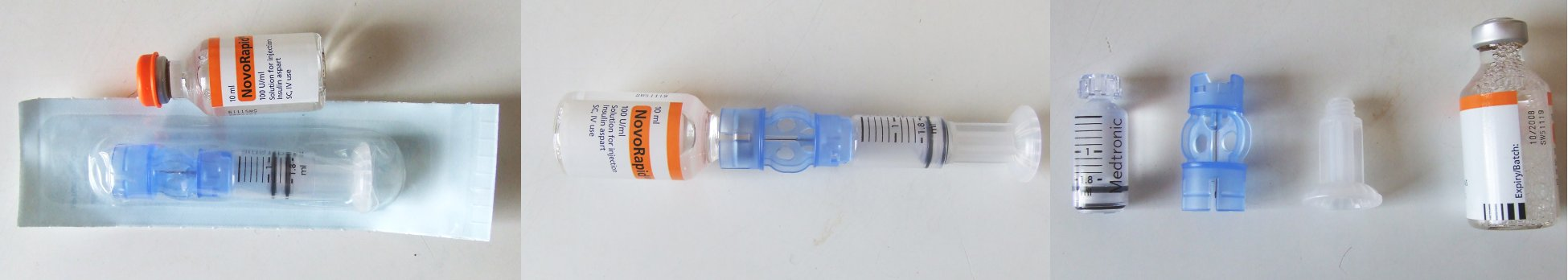
Filling an insulin pump reservoir. (Left to right) 1: Reservoir in sterile packaging. 2: Filling the reservoir. 3: Reservoir with needle and plunger removed, ready for attachment to infusion set.

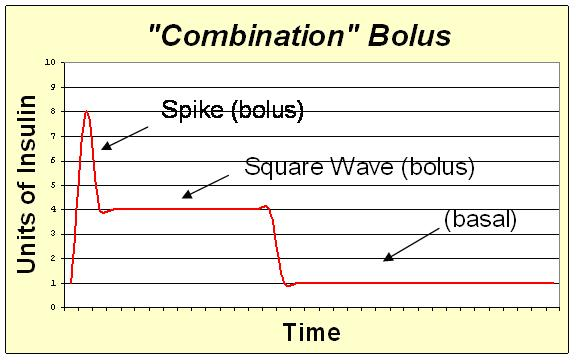

An insulin pump allows the replacement of slow-acting insulin for basal needs with a continuous infusion of rapid-acting insulin.

The insulin pump delivers a single type of rapid-acting insulin in two ways:

- a bolus dose that is pumped to cover food eaten or to correct a high blood glucose level.
- a basal dose that is pumped continuously at an adjustable basal rate to deliver insulin needed between meals and at night.

=== Bolus shape ===
An insulin pump user can influence the profile of the rapid-acting insulin by shaping the bolus. Users can experiment with bolus shapes to determine what is best for any given food, which means that they can improve control of blood sugar by adapting the bolus shape to their needs.

A standard bolus is an infusion of insulin pumped completely at the onset of the bolus. It's the most similar to an injection. By pumping with a "spike" shape, the expected action is the fastest possible bolus for that type of insulin. The standard bolus is most appropriate when eating high carb, low protein, low fat meals because it will return blood sugar to normal levels quickly.

An extended bolus is a slow infusion of insulin spread out over time. By pumping with a "square wave" shape, the bolus avoids a high initial dose of insulin that may enter the blood and cause low blood sugar before digestion can facilitate sugar entering the blood. The extended bolus also extends the action of insulin well beyond that of the insulin alone. The extended bolus is appropriate when covering high fat high protein meals such as steak, which will be raising blood sugar for many hours past the onset of the bolus. The extended bolus is also useful for those with slow digestion (such as with gastroparesis or coeliac disease).

A combination bolus/multiwave bolus is the combination of a standard bolus spike with an extended bolus square wave. This shape provides a large dose of insulin up front, and then also extends the tail of the insulin action. The combination bolus is appropriate for high carb high fat meals such as pizza, pasta with heavy cream sauce, and chocolate cake.

A super bolus is a method of increasing the spike of the standard bolus. Since the action of the bolus insulin in the blood stream will extend for several hours, the basal insulin could be stopped or reduced during this time. This facilitates the "borrowing" of the basal insulin and including it into the bolus spike to deliver the same total insulin with faster action than can be achieved with spike and basal rate together. The super bolus is useful for certain foods (like sugary breakfast cereals) which cause a large post-prandial peak of blood sugar. It attacks the blood sugar peak with the fastest delivery of insulin that can be practically achieved by pumping.

=== Bolus timing ===
Since the pump user is responsible to manually start a bolus, this provides an opportunity for the user to pre-bolus to improve upon the insulin pump's capability to prevent postprandial hyperglycemia. A pre-bolus is simply a bolus of insulin given before it is actually needed to cover carbohydrates eaten.

There are two situations where a pre-bolus is helpful:

1. A pre-bolus of insulin will mitigate a spike in blood sugar that results from eating high glycemic foods. Infused insulin analogs such as NovoLog and Apidra typically begin to reduce blood sugar levels 15 or 20 minutes after infusion. As a result, easily digested sugars often hit the bloodstream much faster than infused insulin intended to cover them, and the blood sugar level spikes upward as a result. If the bolus were infused 20 minutes before eating, then the pre-bolused insulin would hit the bloodstream simultaneously with the digested sugars to control the magnitude of the spike.
2. A pre-bolus of insulin can combine a meal bolus and a correction bolus when the blood sugar is above the target range before a meal. The timing of the bolus is a controllable variable to bring down the blood sugar level before eating again causes it to increase.

Similarly, a low blood sugar level or a low glycemic food might be best treated with a bolus after a meal is begun. The blood sugar level, the type of food eaten, and a person's individual response to food and insulin affect the ideal time to bolus with the pump.

=== Basal rate patterns ===
The pattern for delivering basal insulin throughout the day can also be customized with a pattern to suit the pump user.

- A reduction of basal at night to prevent low blood sugar in infants and toddlers.
- An increase of basal at night to counteract high blood sugar levels due to growth hormone in teenagers.
- A pre-dawn increase to prevent high blood sugar due to the dawn effect in adults and teens.
- In a proactive plan before regularly scheduled exercise times such as morning gym for elementary school children or after-school basketball practice for high school children.

=== Basal rate determination ===
Basal insulin requirements will vary between individuals and periods of the day. The basal rate for a particular time period is determined by fasting while periodically evaluating the blood sugar level. Neither food nor bolus insulin must be taken for 4 hours before or during the evaluation period. If the blood sugar level changes dramatically during evaluation, then the basal rate can be adjusted to increase or decrease insulin delivery to keep the blood sugar level approximately steady.

For instance, to determine an individual's morning basal requirement, they must skip breakfast. On waking, they would test their blood glucose level periodically until lunch. Changes in blood glucose level are compensated with adjustments in the morning basal rate. The process is repeated over several days, varying the fasting period, until a 24-hour basal profile has been built up which keeps fasting blood sugar levels relatively steady. Once the basal rate is matched to the fasting basal insulin need, the pump user will then gain the flexibility to skip or postpone meals such as sleeping late on the weekends or working overtime on a weekday.

Many factors can change insulin requirements and require an adjustment to the basal rate:

- continued beta cell death following diagnosis of type 1 diabetes (honeymoon period)
- growth spurts particularly during puberty
- weight gain or loss
- any drug treatment that affects insulin sensitivity (e.g. corticosteroids)
- eating, sleeping, or exercise routine changes
- whenever the control over hyperglycemia is degrading
- and according to the seasons.

A pump user should be educated by their diabetes care professional about basal rate determination before beginning pump therapy.

=== Temporary basal rates ===
Since the basal insulin is provided as a rapid-acting insulin, the basal insulin can be immediately increased or decreased as needed with a temporary basal rate. Examples when this is helpful include:

- As a passenger during a long car drive, when insulin needs are different due to inactivity.
- While driving on an extended trip, to reduce the risk of hypoglycemia, a lower temporary basal rate may be programmed.
- During and after spontaneous exercise or sports activities, when the body needs less insulin.
- During illness or stress, when basal demand increases due to insulin resistance.
- When blood ketones are present, when additional insulin is needed.
- When on an extended fast (such as Ramadan, Lent, or Yom Kippur) when basal requirements may be lower.
- During menses, when additional basal insulin might be needed.

== Security ==
In August 2011, an IBM researcher, Jay Radcliffe, demonstrated a security flaw in insulin pumps. Radcliffe was able to hack the wireless interface used to control the pump remotely. Pump manufacturer Medtronic later said security research by McAfee uncovered a flaw in its pumps that could be exploited.

== See also ==
- Automated insulin delivery system
- Continuous glucose monitor
- Minimed Paradigm
