= Basal insulin rate =

In the case of diabetes mellitus, a basal insulin rate is a low rate of continuous insulin supply needed for such purposes as controlling cellular glucose and amino acid uptake. A basal rate in general is the rate of continuous supply of some chemical or process in biology.

Together with a bolus of insulin, the basal insulin completes the total insulin needs of an insulin-dependent person. An insulin pump and wristop controller is one way to arrange for a closely controlled basal insulin rate. The slow-release insulins (e.g., Lantus and Levemir) can provide a similar effect.

In healthy individuals, basal rate is monitored by the pancreas, which provides a regular amount of insulin at all times. The body requires this flow of insulin to enable the body to utilize glucose in the blood stream, so the energy in glucose can be used to carry out bodily functions. Basal rate requirements can differ for individuals depending on the activities they will carry out on that particular day. For example, if one is not highly active on a certain day, they will have a decreased basal rate because they are not using a lot of energy. On the other hand, basal rate increases dramatically when an individual is highly active.

Basal rates often even vary from hour to hour throughout the day. For example, one's insulin needs vary from activity to activity. Activities, such as sports, housework, shopping, gardening, tidying the house, and consuming alcohol all require a lowering in basal rate. These activities all require energy and, thus, use glucose; basal rate must decrease in order to keep glucose levels high enough to be used as fuel for the body. On the other hand, fevers, having a cold, taking a nap, taking cortisone-containing medication, and moments of excitement call for different basal rate needs. In these instances, the body has an overwhelming supply of glucose, and glucose levels need to decrease. To induce this decrease, basal rate needs to increase to increase insulin release to absorb some of the excess glucose from the blood stream.

Those with diabetes mellitus must be aware of their basal rates and regulate them accordingly. Basal rate can be raised and lowered through various methods. For example, individuals with diabetes mellitus often use an insulin pump to supply an increased amount of insulin into the blood stream. Those with diabetes also may eat carbohydrates or sugars to account for low blood sugar. However one monitors and regulates their blood sugar levels and basal rates, it is important to make changes gradually. An initial lowering in basal rate should be no more than 10% of the original. After the initial lowering point, one must note the factor by which one's blood sugar changes. If blood sugar levels decreased, one should lower their basal rate by 20% next time. If their blood sugar levels increased, a lowering of 10% was too great, and one should not lower their basal rate at all next time. If blood sugar levels remained relatively constant, a drop in basal rate of 10% was sufficient.

Just as the action to change basal rate should be gradual in nature, the actual response from changing basal rate does not happen instantly. A change in basal rate is felt around two hours after the action is done. This is especially important for those with diabetes to note, as it affects when they should act to monitor their basal rates. For example, if there is a particular time in the day when one notices a problem with blood glucose levels, they should act to change their basal rate accordingly two hours prior to when the problem was previously experienced.

== Causes of Basal Rate ==
The liver is the primary contributing organ which produces glucose continuously even when nothing is being eaten. The liver will supply glucose either from fats or from previously eaten foods. Therefore, the basal rate can be thought of as a sort of "second bolus" after the initial bolus intake of insulin.

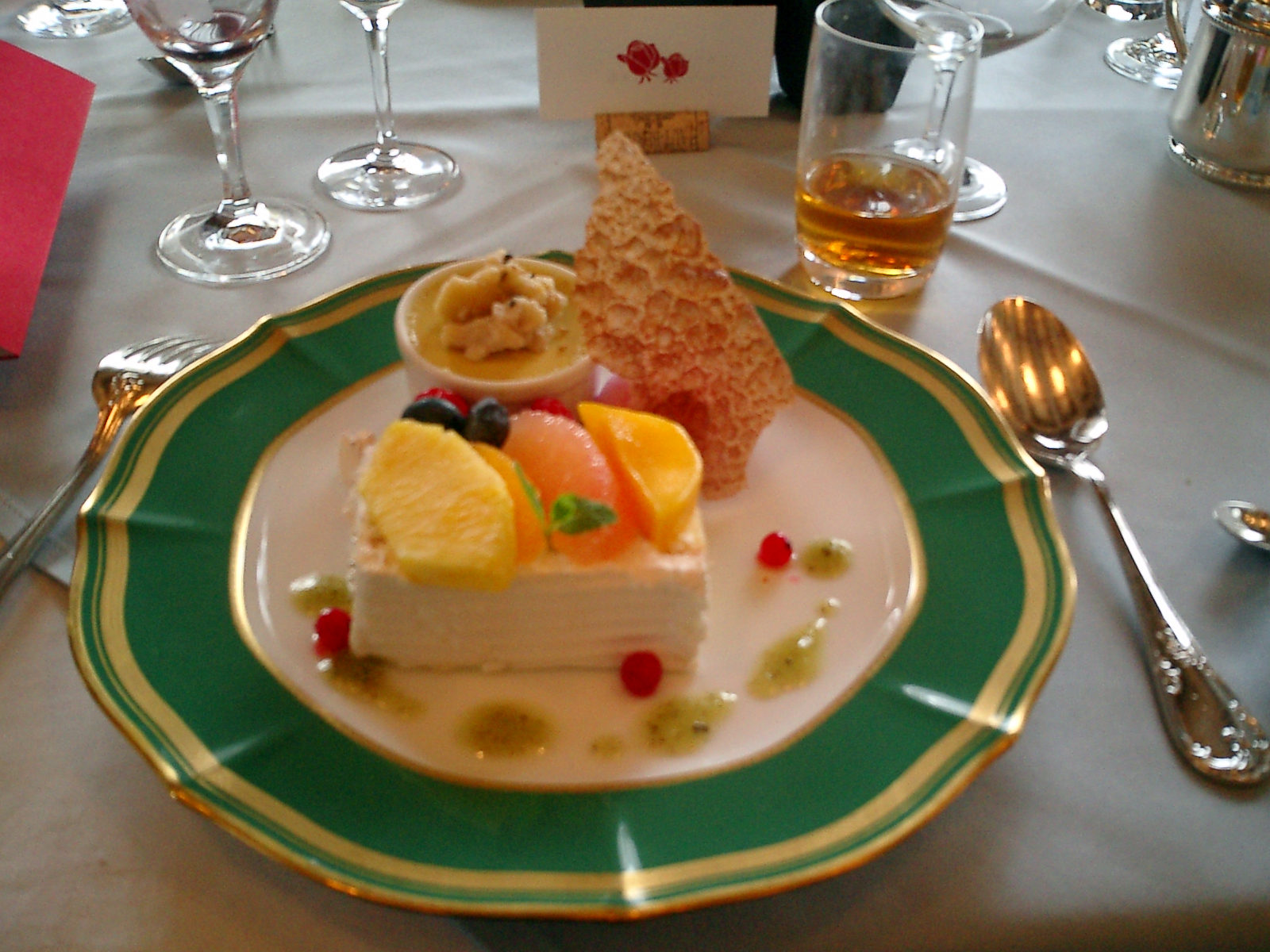
While these sweet treats are delicious, they require a dramatic increase in basal rate to account for the spike in glucose in the blood stream

When one exercises, one requires much more glucose to fuel their body, causing a decrease in basal rate, though this may be a dangerous assumption for active Type 1 diabetics, whose insulin requirements may increase during and after vigorous exercise.

== Modelling the Basal Rate ==
Most adult diabetics (over the age of 21) will have a fairly constant ratio of bolus:basal of 60%:40%, where 60% of all insulin intake in a single 24-hour period will be attributed to meals (bolus) and 40% should then be attributed to the basal rate. This ratio will fluctuate from person to person depending on their size, activity level, and caloric intake as well but is a good baseline for determining the correct basal rate for an adult diabetic. Thus, the basal rate could theoretically be set based on an averaged bolus insulin intake of several days. Averaging the total bolus, and then dividing this number by 36 would then give the required hourly basal rate intake for any individual with a 60:40 ratio established.
