= Infusion set =

Medical Device

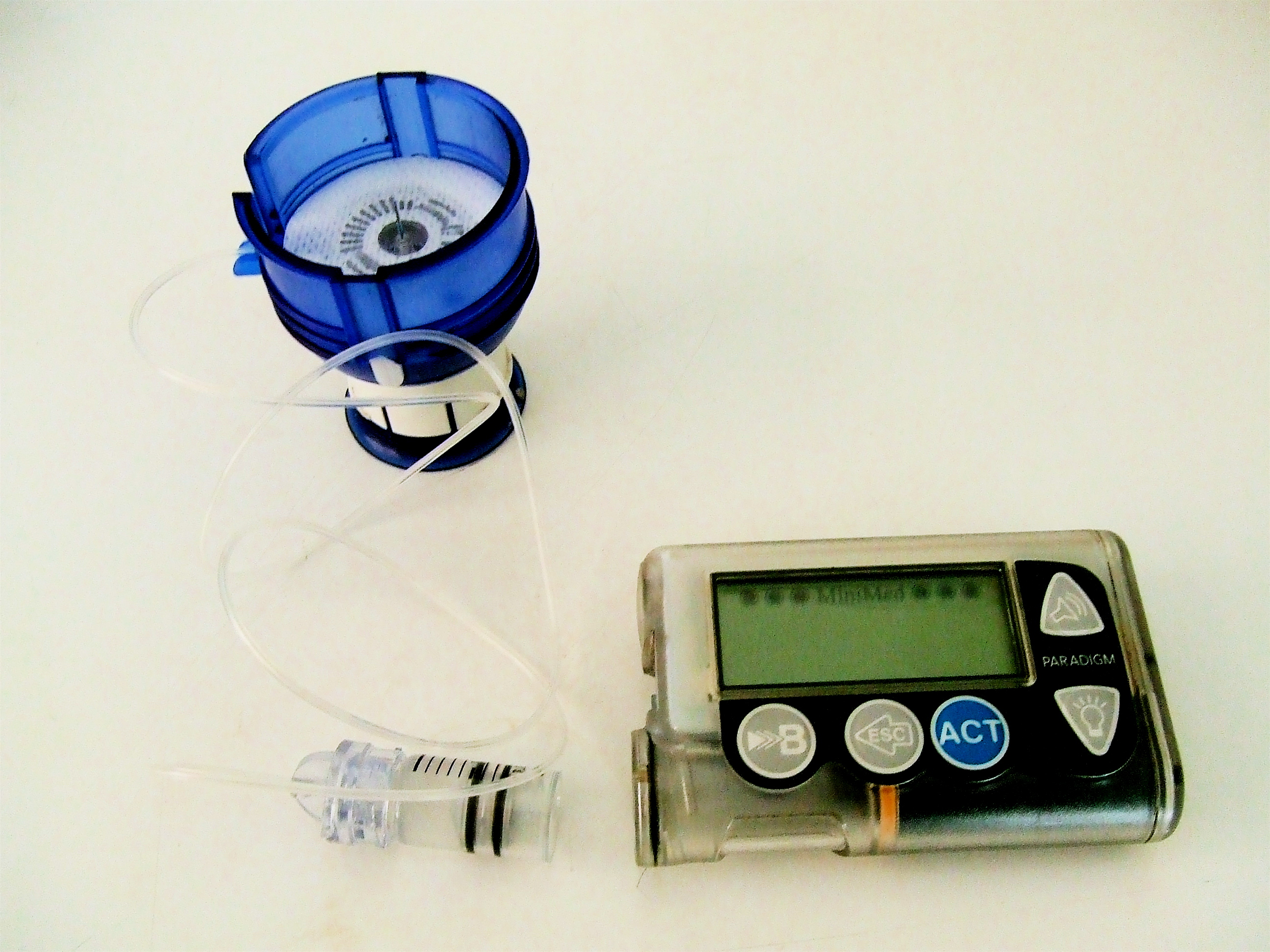
An insulin pump and infusion set. The infusion set is shown loaded into a spring-loaded insertion device (the blue object). A reservoir of insulin is shown attached to the set, awaiting insertion into the pump.

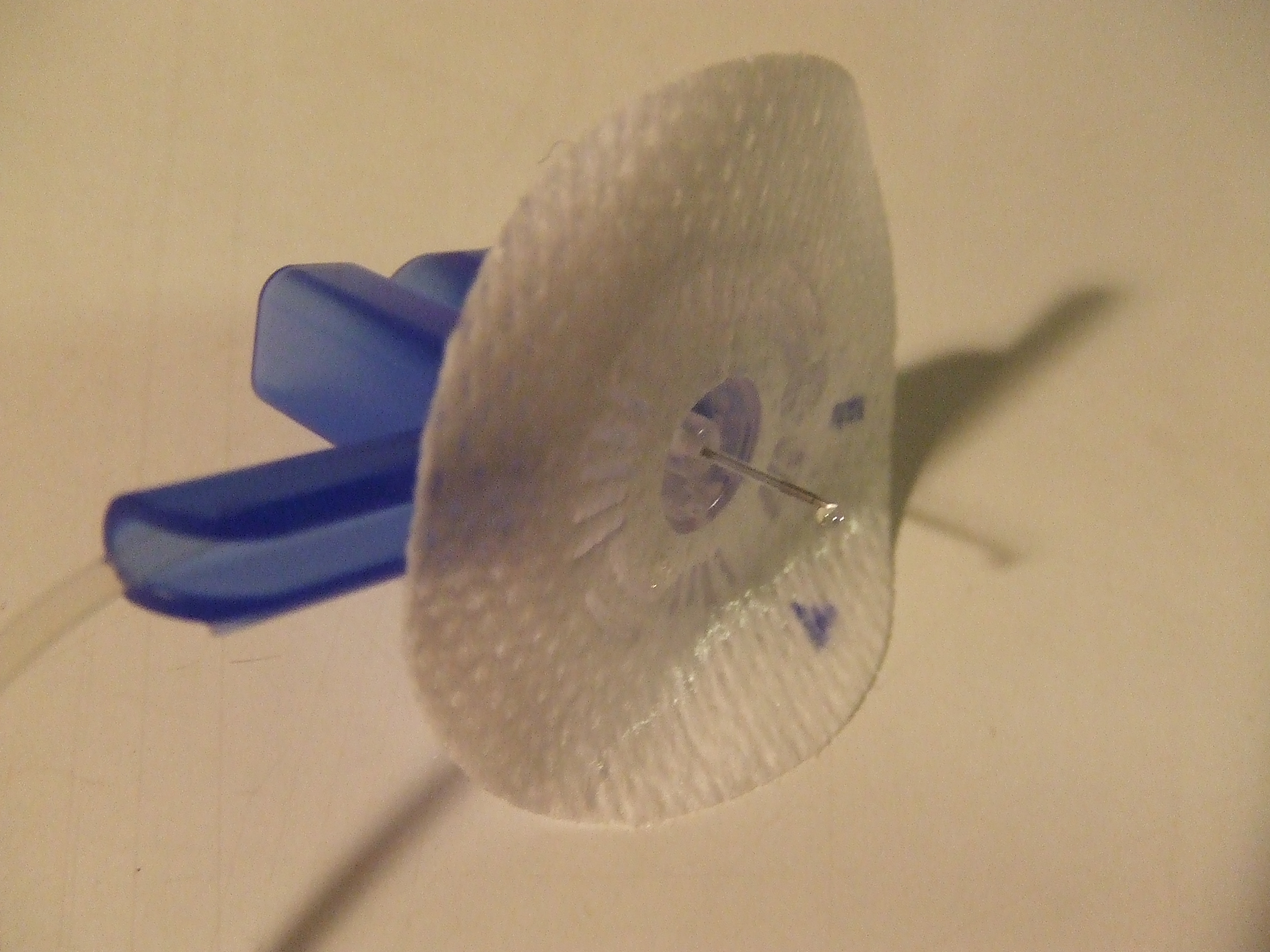
An infusion set, showing the insertion needle. The needle is withdrawn after the infusion set is inserted, leaving just the cannula (currently within the needle) inside the body.

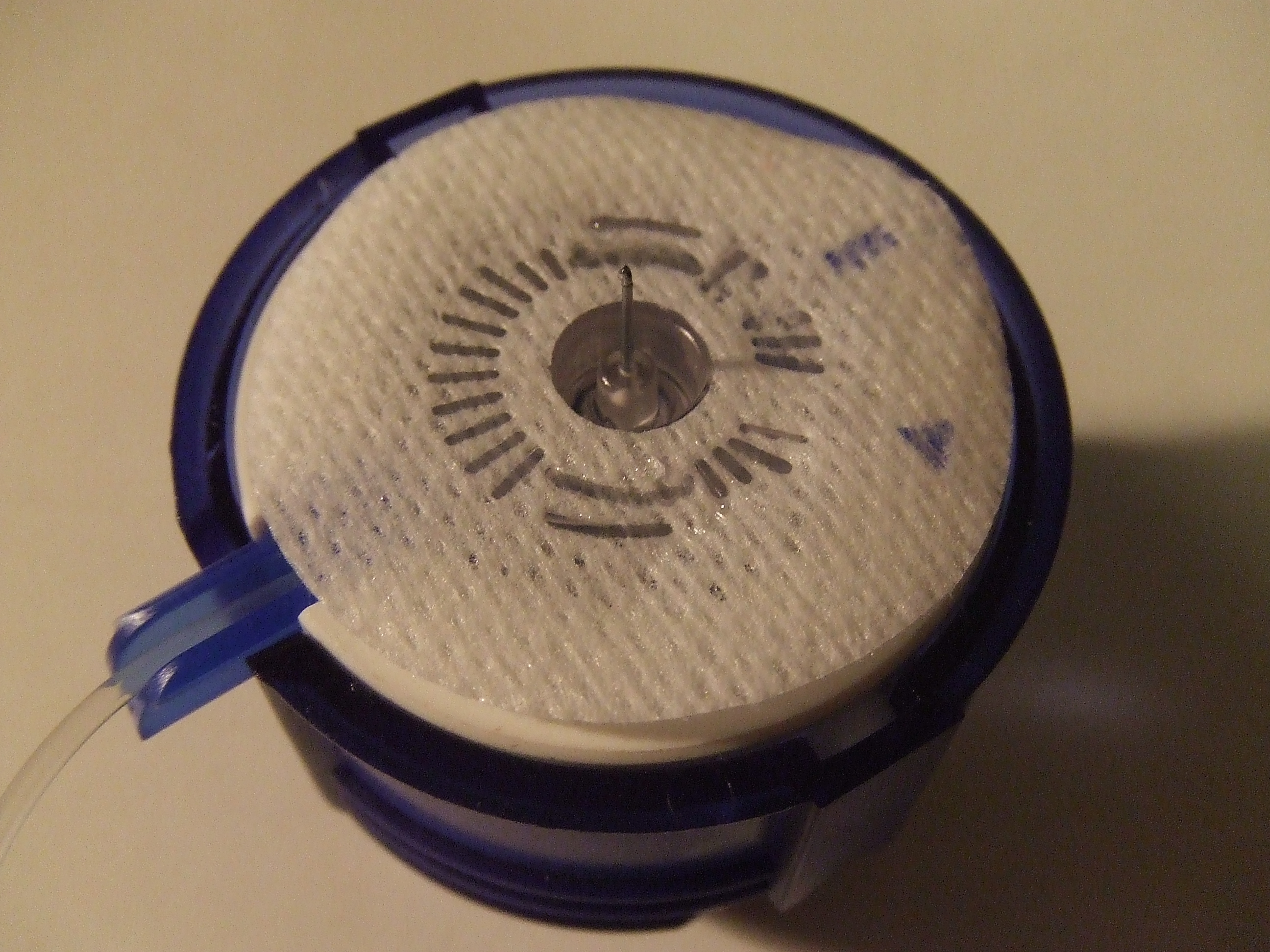
The infusion set loaded into an insertion device.

An infusion set is used with devices such as an insulin pump. The purpose of an infusion set is to deliver insulin under the skin, fulfilling a similar function like an intravenous line. It is a complete tubing system to connect an insulin pump to the pump user and as such includes a subcutaneous cannula, adhesive mount, quick-disconnect, and a pump cartridge connector.

There are several types, styles, and sizes of infusion sets available, varying in cannula length, entry angle and in the length of tube connecting the cannula to the pump. The kind of choice of these options depends on a variety of factors, such as the patient's body fat percentage.

== Functionality ==
=== Insertion devices ===
Some pump users prefer to use an insertion device to insert their sets, rather than pushing the needle in by hand. These are spring-loaded and are designed to push the needle into the skin quickly. The user simply loads the primed set into the insertion device, peels off the paper protecting the adhesive pad, places the device against the skin and presses a button. This may be an advantage for those with needle phobia.

=== Sites for infusion sets ===
Infusion sets are most commonly placed on the abdomen, in a roughly semicircular area around and below the navel. Other sites include the upper leg, upper buttocks, hips, upper arms and lower back. Insulin absorption may vary from site to site, and therefore medical advice is required.

=== Rotation of sites ===
The infusion set is replaced regularly, usually every 2–3 days. Insulin absorption becomes less effective the longer the set is left in place, leading to poorer control of blood glucose. For this reason, the site of the infusion set is moved when the set is changed. Often a number of favorite sites for the infusion set are used on a rotation basis.

=== Disconnecting the set ===
The set can be disconnected from the pump and tubing with a quick-release that leaves the cannula and adhesive pad in place. This is convenient when swimming or showering (since most pumps are not fully waterproof), or when engaging in any activity when it is not desirable to be attached to the pump.
