= Dawn phenomenon =

Observed increase in glucose levels in the early-morning

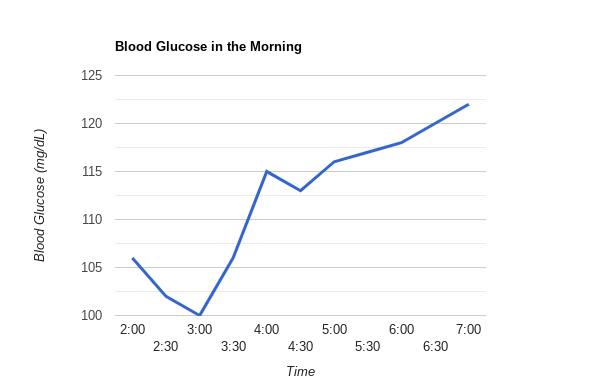
A diabetic's blood glucose from 2:00 am to 7:00 am

The dawn phenomenon, sometimes called the dawn effect, is an observed increase in blood sugar (glucose) levels that takes place in the early-morning, often between 2 a.m. and 8 a.m. First described by Schmidt in 1981 as an increase of blood glucose or insulin demand occurring at dawn, this naturally occurring phenomenon is frequently seen among the general population and is clinically relevant for patients with diabetes as it can affect their medical management. In contrast to Chronic Somogyi rebound, the dawn phenomenon is not associated with nocturnal hypoglycemia.

== Physiology ==
Although not yet completely understood, the dawn phenomenon is thought to be caused by an exaggeration of the normal physiologic hormonal processes that occur overnight. Overnight, the human body sees increased levels of several hormones, most notably growth hormone and catecholamines, that lead to increased rates of glucose production and release from the liver. These hormones also inhibit the effects of insulin, leading to an overall increase in circulating blood glucose. This effect is amplified in patients with islet β-cell dysfunction such as diabetics. Notably throughout this process glucagon levels remain unchanged and the increased levels of cortisol observed overnight do not appear to be involved. Observed hyperglycemia secondary to the dawn phenomenon is often defined as an increase in blood glucose of at least >1.1 mmol/L (20 mg/dL) between the lowest level at night and the highest level before breakfast; however, actual ranges may vary.

The physiologic process involved in causing the dawn phenomenon has been shown to occur in most people. In non-diabetic patients, there is a modest increase in insulin secretion just before dawn which compensates for the increased glucose being released from the liver to prevent hyperglycemia. However, studies have shown that diabetic patients fail to compensate for this transiently increased blood glucose release, resulting in hyperglycemia. This resulting hyperglycemia is clinically relevant in diabetic patients as its lasting effects can lead to overall poor glycemic control. In Type 1 diabetics hyperglycemia due to the dawn phenomenon can persist despite adequate insulin compensation overnight, while in Type 2 diabetics the dawn phenomenon has been shown to be resistant to treatment with both oral medications and diet modifications.

An "extended" dawn phenomenon has also been observed in which the abnormal increase in blood glucose levels continues after breakfast. This prolonged duration is thought to be caused by the compounding effects of absorbing and metabolizing breakfast carbohydrates during this period. Both the dawn phenomenon and its extended period have been shown to be significantly more difficult to control when a patient's HbA1c is greater than 7%.

== Treatment ==
Management of the dawn phenomenon varies by patient and thus should be done with regular assistance from a patient's physician. Some treatment options include, but are not limited to, dietary modifications, increased exercise before breakfast and during the evening, and oral anti-hyperglycemic medications if a patient's HbA1c is > 7%. Insulin pumps can also be used to provide continuous subcutaneous infusions and are regarded as the gold standard for managing the dawn phenomenon in type 1 diabetics. Continuous glucose monitoring systems (CGM) are used to monitor changes in blood sugar overnight.

== See also ==
- Cortisol awakening response
