= Bolus (medicine) =

Way to administer medicine

In medicine, a bolus (from Latin bolus, ball) is the administration of a discrete amount of medication, drug, or other compound within a specific time, generally 1–30 minutes, to raise its concentration in blood to an effective level. The administration can be given by injection: intravenously, intramuscularly, intrathecally, subcutaneously, or by inhalation. The article on routes of administration provides more information, as the preceding list of ROAs is not exhaustive.

== Placement ==
The placement of the bolus dose depends on the systemic levels of the contents desired throughout the body. An intramuscular injection of vaccines allows for a slow release of the antigen to stimulate the body's immune system and to allow time for developing antibodies. Subcutaneous injections are used by heroin addicts (called 'skin popping', referring to the bump formed by the bolus of heroin), to sustain a slow release that staves off withdrawal symptoms without producing euphoria.

A bolus delivered directly to the veins through an intravenous drip allows a much faster delivery which quickly raises the concentration of the substance in the blood to an effective level. This is typically done at the beginning of a treatment or after a removal of medicine from blood (e.g. through dialysis).

== Diabetes ==
Diabetics and health care professionals use bolus to refer to a dosage of fast-acting insulin with a meal (as opposed to basal rate, which is a dose of slow-acting insulin or the continuous pumping of a small quantity of fast-acting insulin to cover the glucose output of the liver).

== Veterinary medicine ==
In veterinary medicine a bolus is a large time-release tablet that stays in the rumen of cattle, goats, and sheep. It can also refer to a dose of liquid injected subcutaneously with a hypodermic needle, such as saline solution administered either to counteract dehydration or especially to mitigate kidney failure, a common ailment in domestic cats. Before it is fully absorbed, which can take several minutes or longer, the liquid remains in the form of a bolus, a ball or lump under the animal's skin.

== Radiation therapy ==
In radiation therapy, bolus is a waxy tissue equivalent material placed on the skin surface to homogenize or modulate the range of the dose from external beams of radiation.
