= Blood glucose monitoring =

Use of a glucose monitor for testing the concentration of glucose in the blood

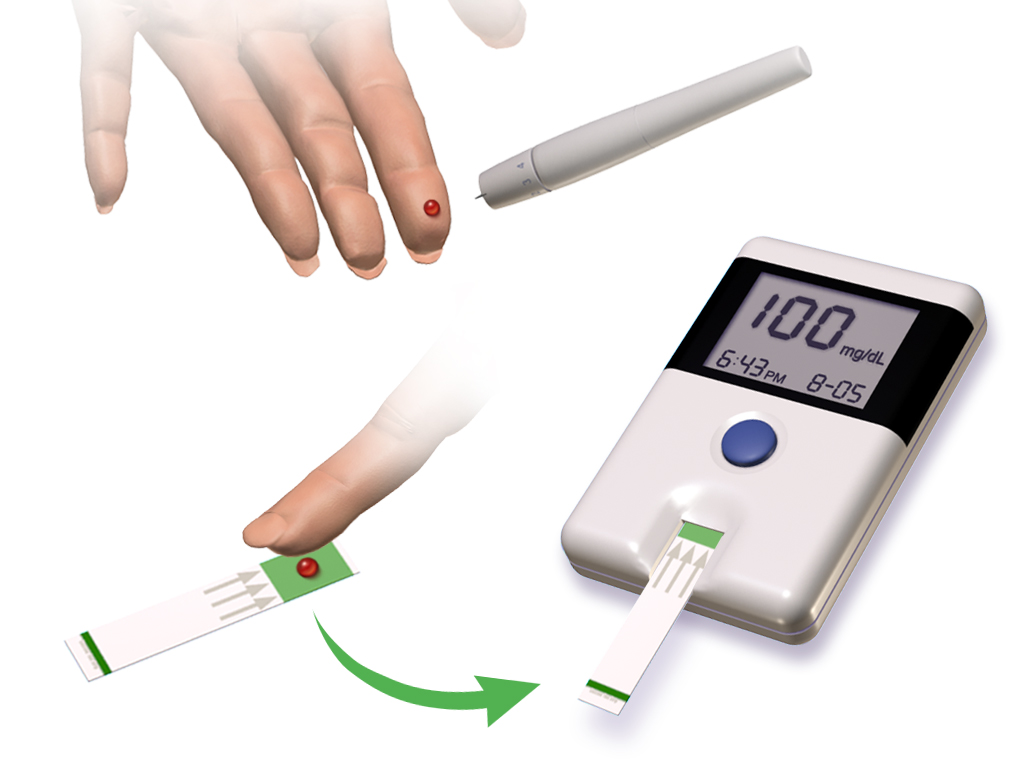
- 3D rendering of blood glucose testing
- MeSH: D015190

Blood glucose monitoring is the use of a glucose meter for testing the concentration of glucose in the blood (glycemia). Particularly important in diabetes management, a blood glucose test is typically performed by piercing the skin (typically, via fingerstick) to draw blood, then applying the blood to a chemically active disposable 'test-strip'. The other main option is continuous glucose monitoring (CGM). Different manufacturers use different technology, but most systems measure an electrical characteristic and use this to determine the glucose level in the blood. Skin-prick methods measure capillary blood glucose (i.e., the level found in capillary blood), whereas CGM correlates interstitial fluid glucose level to blood glucose level. Measurements may occur after fasting or at random nonfasting intervals (random glucose tests), each of which informs diagnosis or monitoring in different ways.

Healthcare professionals advise patients with diabetes mellitus on the appropriate monitoring regimen for their condition. Most people with type 2 diabetes test at least once per day. The Mayo Clinic generally recommends that diabetics who use insulin (all type 1 diabetics and many type 2 diabetics) test their blood sugar more often (4–8 times per day for type 1 diabetics, 2 or more times per day for type 2 diabetics), both to assess the effectiveness of their prior insulin dose and to help determine their next insulin dose.

== Purpose ==
Blood glucose monitoring reveals individual patterns of blood glucose changes, and helps in the planning of meals, activities, and at what time of day to take medications.

Also, testing allows for a quick response to high blood sugar (hyperglycemia) or low blood sugar (hypoglycemia). This might include diet adjustments, exercise, and insulin (as instructed by the health care provider).

== Blood glucose meters ==
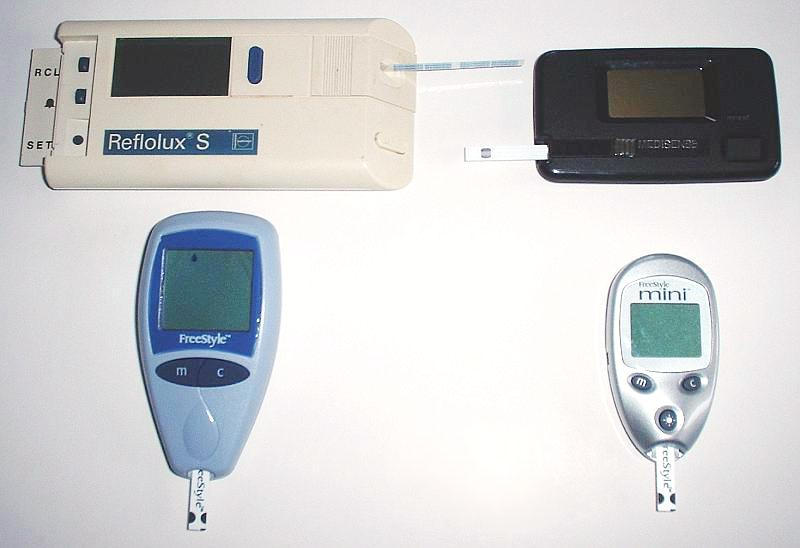
Four generations of blood glucose meter, c. 1991–2005. Sample sizes vary from 30 to 0.3 μl. Test times vary from 5 seconds to 2 minutes (modern meters typically require less than 15 seconds).

A blood glucose meter is an electronic device for measuring the blood glucose level. A relatively small drop of blood is placed on a disposable test strip which interfaces with a digital meter. Within several seconds, the level of blood glucose will be shown on the digital display. Needing only a small drop of blood for the meter means that the time and effort required for testing are reduced and the compliance of diabetic people to their testing regimens is improved significantly. Blood glucose meters provide results in various units such as eAG (mg/dL) and eAG (mmol/L), and may also estimate A1C levels. These measurements can aid in classifying blood glucose levels as normal, prediabetic, or diabetic, facilitating effective diabetes management for users. While some models offer interpretative features that indicate the health status based on these results, not all meters provide this functionality, focusing instead on providing raw glucose measurements. Users of blood glucose meters without interpretative features can utilize online calculators to determine their blood glucose status based on measured values. The cost of using blood glucose meters is believed to be a cost-benefit relative to the avoided medical costs of the complications of diabetes.

Recent advances include:

- alternative site testing, the use of blood drops from places other than the fingertips, usually the palm or forearm. This alternative site testing uses the same test strips and meter, is practically pain-free, and gives the fingertips a needed break if they become sore. The disadvantage of this technique is that there is usually less blood flow to alternative sites, which prevents the reading from being accurate when the blood sugar level is changing.
- no coding systems. Older systems required 'coding' of the strips to the meter. This carried a risk of 'miscoding', which can lead to inaccurate results. Two approaches have resulted in systems that no longer require coding. Some systems are 'autocoded', where technology is used to code each strip to the meter. And some are manufactured to a 'single code', thereby avoiding the risk of miscoding.
- multi-test systems. Some systems use a cartridge or a disc containing multiple test strips. This has the advantage that the user doesn't have to load individual strips each time, which is convenient and can enable quicker testing.
- downloadable companion software. Most newer systems come with software that allows the user to download meter results to a computer. This information can then be used, together with health care professional guidance, to enhance and improve diabetes management. The meters usually require a connection cable, unless they are designed to work wirelessly with an insulin pump, are designed to plug directly into the computer, or use a radio (Bluetooth, for example) or infrared connection.

== Continuous glucose monitoring ==
A continuous glucose monitor determines glucose levels on a continuous basis (every few minutes). A typical system consists of:

- a disposable glucose sensor placed just under the skin, which is worn for a few days until replacement
- a link from the sensor to a non-implanted transmitter which communicates to a radio receiver
- an electronic receiver is worn like a pager (or insulin pump) that displays glucose levels with nearly continuous updates, as well as monitors rising and falling trends.

Continuous glucose monitors measure the concentration of glucose in a sample of interstitial fluid. Shortcomings of CGM systems due to this fact are:

- continuous systems must be calibrated with a traditional blood glucose measurement (using current technology) and therefore require both the CGM system and occasional "fingerstick"
- glucose levels in interstitial fluid have a time lag behind blood glucose values

Patients, therefore, require traditional fingerstick measurements for calibration (typically twice per day) and are often advised to use fingerstick measurements to confirm hypo- or hyperglycemia before taking corrective action.

The lag time mentioned above has been reported to be about 5 minutes. Anecdotally, some users of the various systems report lag times of up to 10–15 minutes. This lag time is insignificant when blood sugar levels are relatively consistent. However, blood sugar levels, when changing rapidly, may read in the normal range on a CGM system while in reality the patient is already experiencing symptoms of an out-of-range blood glucose value and may require treatment. Patients using CGM are therefore advised to consider both the absolute value of the blood glucose level given by the system as well as any trend in the blood glucose levels. For example, a patient using CGM with a blood glucose of 100 mg/dl on their CGM system might take no action if their blood glucose has been consistent for several readings, while a patient with the same blood glucose level but whose blood glucose has been dropping steeply in a short period of time might be advised to perform a fingerstick test to check for hypoglycemia.

Continuous monitoring allows examination of how the blood glucose level reacts to insulin, exercise, food, and other factors. The additional data can be useful for setting correct insulin dosing ratios for food intake and correction of hyperglycemia. Monitoring during periods when blood glucose levels are not typically checked (e.g. overnight) can help to identify problems in insulin dosing (such as basal levels for insulin pump users or long-acting insulin levels for patients taking injections). Monitors may also be equipped with alarms to alert patients of hyperglycemia or hypoglycemia so that a patient can take corrective action(s) (after fingerstick testing, if necessary) even in cases where they do not feel symptoms of either condition. While the technology has its limitations, studies have demonstrated that patients with continuous sensors experience a smaller number of hyperglycemic and hypoglycemic events, a reduction in their glycated hemoglobin levels and a decrease in glycemic variability. Compared to intermittent testing, it is likely to help reduce hypertensive complications during pregnancy. In addition, investigations on the use of test strips have shown that the required self-injury acts as a psychological barrier restraining the patients from sufficient glucose control. The excessive glucose levels partially resulting from it, and the resulting secondary diseases from those levels can be decreased through the use of continuous monitoring. In a recent systematic review with meta-analysis about glycaemia monitoring in critical patients who are haemodynamically unstable and require intensive monitoring of glycaemia it concluded that should be undertaken using arterial blood samples and POC blood gas analysers, as this is more reliable and is not affected by the variability of different confusion factors. Determining glycaemia in capillary blood using glucometry may be suitable in stable patients or when close monitoring of glycaemia is not required.

Continuous blood glucose monitoring is not automatically covered by health insurance in the United States in the same way that most other diabetic supplies are covered (e.g. standard glucose testing supplies, insulin, and insulin pumps). However, an increasing number of insurance companies do cover continuous glucose monitoring supplies (both the receiver and disposable sensors) on a case-by-case basis if the patient and doctor show a specific need. The lack of insurance coverage is exacerbated by the fact that disposable sensors must be frequently replaced. Some sensors have been U.S. Food and Drug Administration (FDA) approved for 7- and 3-day use, (although some patients wear sensors for longer than the recommended period) and the receiving meters likewise have finite lifetimes (less than 2 years and as little as 6 months). This is one factor in the slow uptake in the use of sensors that have been marketed in the United States.

The principles, history and recent developments of operation of electrochemical glucose biosensors are discussed in a chemical review by Joseph Wang.

== Glucose sensing bio-implants ==
Glucose concentrations do not necessarily have to be measured in blood vessels, but may also be determined in the interstitial fluid, where the same levels prevail – with a time lag of a few minutes – due to its connection with the capillary system. However, the enzymatic glucose detection scheme used in single-use test strips is not directly suitable for implants. One main problem is caused by the varying supply of oxygen, by which glucose is converted to glucono lactone and H_{2}O_{2} by glucose oxidase. Since the implantation of a sensor into the body is accompanied by growth of encapsulation tissue, the diffusion of oxygen to the reaction zone is continuously diminished. This decreasing oxygen availability causes the sensor reading to drift, requiring frequent re-calibration using finger-sticks and test strips.

One approach to achieving long-term glucose sensing is to measure and compensate for the changing local oxygen concentration. Other approaches replace the troublesome glucose oxidase reaction with a reversible sensing reaction, known as an affinity assay. This scheme was originally put forward by Schultz & Sims in 1978. A number of different affinity assays have been investigated, with fluorescent assays proving most common. MEMS technology has recently allowed for smaller and more convenient alternatives to fluorescent detection, via measurement of viscosity. Investigation of affinity-based sensors has shown that encapsulation by body tissue does not cause a drift of the sensor signal, but only a time lag of the signal compared to the direct measurement in blood. A new implantable continuous glucose monitor based on affinity principles and fluorescence detection is the Eversense device manufactured by Senseonics Inc. This device has been approved by the FDA for 90 day implantation.

== Non-invasive technologies ==
Some new technologies to monitor blood glucose levels will not require access to blood to read the glucose level. Non-invasive technologies include microwave/RF sensing, near IR detection, ultrasound and dielectric spectroscopy. These may free the person with diabetes from finger sticks to supply the drop of blood for blood glucose analysis.

Most of the non-invasive methods under development are continuous glucose monitoring methods and offer the advantage of providing additional information to the subject between the conventional finger stick, blood glucose measurements, and overtime periods where no finger stick measurements are available (i.e. while the subject is sleeping).

== Effectiveness ==
For patients with diabetes mellitus type 2, the importance of monitoring and the optimal frequency of monitoring are not clear. A 2011 study found no evidence that blood glucose monitoring leads to better patient outcomes in actual practice. Randomized controlled trials found that self-monitoring of blood glucose did not improve glycated hemoglobin (HbA1c) among "reasonably well controlled non-insulin treated patients with type 2 diabetes" or lead to significant changes in quality of life. However a recent meta-analysis of 47 randomized controlled trials encompassing 7677 patients showed that self-care management intervention improves glycemic control in diabetics, with an estimated 0.36% (95% CI, 0.21–0.51) reduction in their glycated hemoglobin values. Furthermore, a recent study showed that patients described as being "Uncontrolled Diabetics" (defined in this study by HbA1C levels >8%) showed a statistically significant decrease in the HbA1C levels after a 90-day period of seven-point self-monitoring of blood glucose (SMBG) with a relative risk reduction (RRR) of 0.18% (95% CI, 0.86–2.64%, p<.001). Regardless of lab values or other numerical parameters, the purpose of the clinician is to improve quality of life and patient outcomes in diabetic patients. A recent study included 12 randomized controlled trials and evaluated outcomes in 3259 patients. The authors concluded through a qualitative analysis that SMBG on quality of life showed no effect on patient satisfaction or the patients' health-related quality of life. Furthermore, the same study identified that patients with type 2 diabetes mellitus diagnosed greater than one year prior to initiation of SMBG, who were not on insulin, experienced a statistically significant reduction in their HbA1C of 0.3% (95% CI, -0.4 – -0.1) at six months follow up, but a statistically insignificant reduction of 0.1% (95% CI, -0.3 – 0.04) at twelve months follow up. Conversely, newly diagnosed patients experienced a statistically significant reduction of 0.5% (95% CI, -0.9 – -0.1) at 12 months follow up. A recent study found that a treatment strategy of intensively lowering blood sugar levels (below 6%) in patients with additional cardiovascular disease risk factors poses more harm than benefit. For type 2 diabetics who are not on insulin, exercise and diet are the best tools. Blood glucose monitoring is, in that case, simply a tool to evaluate the success of diet and exercise. Insulin-dependent type 2 diabetics do not need to monitor their blood sugar as frequently as type 1 diabetics. In a recent systematic review with meta-analysis, about glycaemia monitoring in critical patients who are haemodynamically unstable and require intensive monitoring of glycaemia it concluded that should be undertaken using arterial blood samples and POC blood gas analysers, as this is more reliable and is not affected by the variability of different confusion factors. Determining glycaemia in capillary blood using glucometry may be suitable in stable patients or when close monitoring of glycaemia is not required.

== Recommendations ==
The National Institute for Health and Clinical Excellence (NICE), UK released updated diabetes recommendations on 30 May 2008, which recommend that self-monitoring of plasma glucose levels for people with newly diagnosed type 2 diabetes must be integrated into a structured self-management education process. The recommendations have been updated in August 2015 for children and young adults with type 1 diabetes.

The American Diabetes Association (ADA), which produces guidelines for diabetes care and clinical practice recommendations, recently updated its "Standards of Medical Care" in January 2019 to acknowledge that routine self-monitoring of blood glucose in people who are not using insulin is of limited additional clinical benefit. A randomized controlled trial evaluated once-daily self-monitoring that included tailored patient messaging and did not show that this strategy led to significant changes in A1C after a year.
