= Avideh Nazeri =

Iranian endocrinologist

- Education: King's College London
- Employer: Novo Nordisk
- Known for: Medicine Pharmaceutical Science

Avideh Nazeri is an Iranian endocrinologist who is director of clinical, medical, and regulatory for Novo Nordisk UK and Ireland.

== Education ==
Nazeri dreamed of becoming an air hostess as a child, but was encouraged by a teacher to study medicine. She trained in medicine at King's College London GKT School of Medical Education.

== Career ==
In 2008, Nazeri joined Novo Nordisk in Iran, before working in their global affairs department in Denmark. As global medical director she was in charge of the research portfolio on modern insulins aspart and semaglutide. In 2013 Nazeri became head of medical affairs in Canada, where she launched Key Opinion Leader (KOL) engagement and learning programmes within their medical affairs group. In October 2016 Nazeri was appointed as director of Novo Nordisk and worked to build partnerships and drive innovation.

Nazeri has expressed concern about the lack of awareness around the health risks of diabetes mellitus type 2, especially with regards to the development of cardiovascular disease. In 2017 Nazeri urged the public to return faulty insulin cartridge holders in the NovoPen Echo and NovoPen 5 devices, which were found to break when exposed to household cleaning agents. Under her leadership, the organisation has expanded treatment options for patients with diabetes. It was reported that Novo Nordisk's insulin degludec was the most cost-effective diabetic treatment. She launched Fiasp, a new fast acting insulin, which improves blood sugar levels after meals by working twice as quickly in the bloodstream.

Nazeri has contributed to Pharmaceutical Journal.
