= Oralin =

Oralin may refer to:

- Oralin (insulin)
- Sertraline, an antidepressant known by the trade name Oralin
