= Insulin degludec =

Ultralong-acting basal insulin analogue

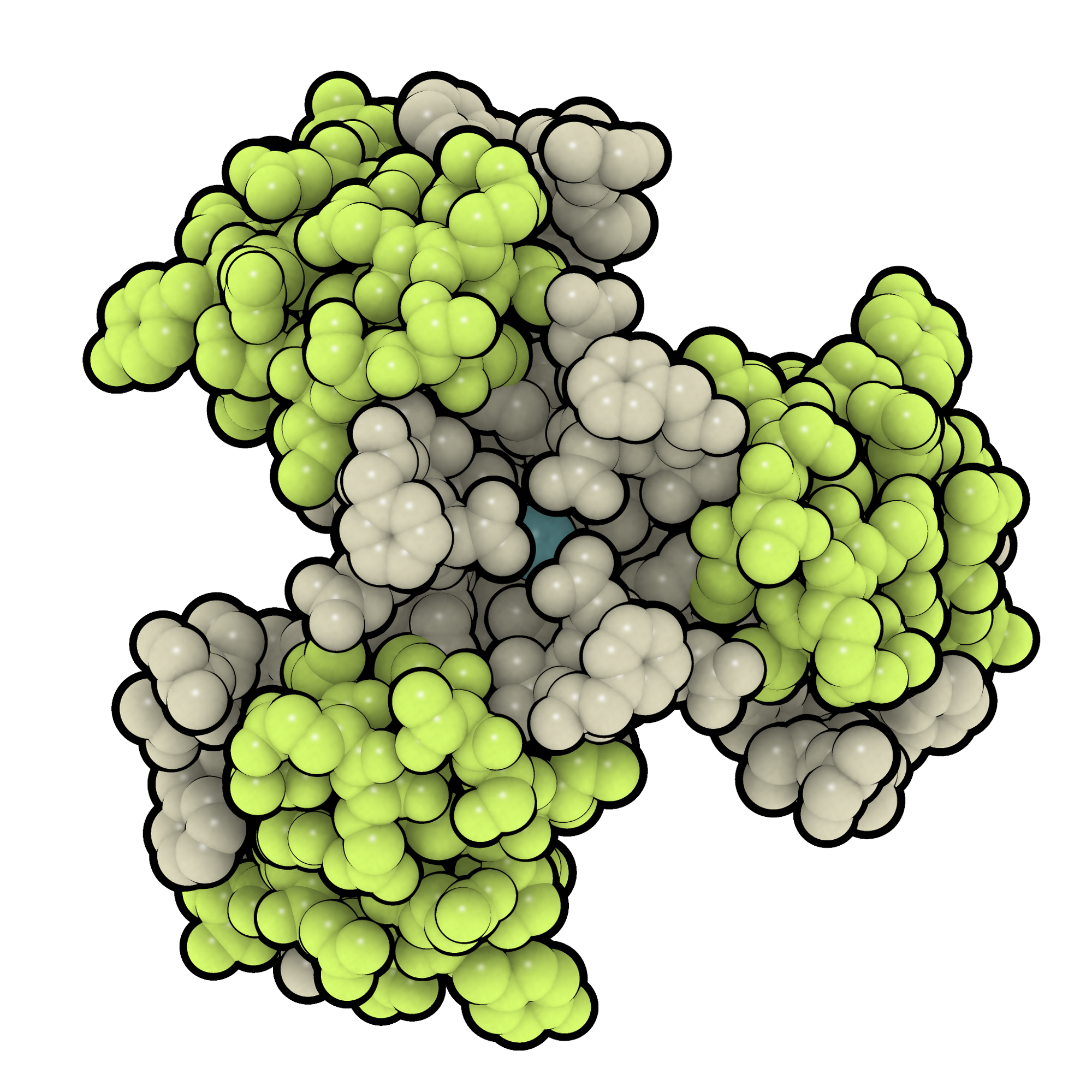
- An insulin degludec hexamer. A chains are chartreuse, B chains are tan, and the central zinc atom is teal. From PDB: 4AKJ.

Clinical data
- Pronunciation: /ˈɪnsəlɪn dɪˈɡluːdɛk/ IN-sə-lin də-GLOO-dek
- Trade names: Tresiba
- AHFS/Drugs.com: Monograph
- MedlinePlus: a615055
- License data: US DailyMed: Insulin degludec
- Pregnancy category: AU: B3
- Routes of administration: Subcutaneous
- ATC code: A10AE06 (WHO)

Legal status
- Legal status: AU: S4 (Prescription only); CA: ℞-only; US: ℞-only; EU: Rx-only; In general: ℞ (Prescription only)

Pharmacokinetic data
- Onset of action: 30–90 minutes
- Duration of action: ≤ 42 hours

Identifiers
- IUPAC name: B29N(ε)-ω-carboxypentadecanoyl-γ-L-glutamyl desB30 human insulin
- CAS Number: 844439-96-9
- PubChem SID: 124490467
- ChemSpider: none
- UNII: 54Q18076QB
- KEGG: D09727

Chemical and physical data
- Formula: C_{274}H_{411}N_{65}O_{81}S_{6}
- Molar mass: 6104.04 g·mol^{−1}

Insulin degludec (INN/USAN) is an ultralong-acting basal insulin analogue that was developed by Novo under the brand name Tresiba. It is administered via subcutaneous injection to help control the blood sugar level of those with diabetes. It has a duration of action that lasts up to 42 hours (compared to 18 to 26 hours provided by other marketed long-acting insulins such as insulin glargine and insulin detemir), making it a once-daily basal insulin, that is one that provides a base insulin level, as opposed to the fast- and short-acting bolus insulins.

Insulin degludec is a modified insulin that has one single amino acid deleted in comparison to human insulin, and is conjugated to hexadecanedioic acid via gamma-L-glutamyl spacer at the amino acid lysine at position B29.

It is included on the World Health Organization's List of Essential Medicines as an equivalent to insulin glargine. In 2023, it was the 152nd most commonly prescribed medication in the United States, with more than 3 million prescriptions.

== Medical uses ==
Insulin degludec is indicated to improve glycemic control in people with diabetes.

In a meta-analysis involving data from 3 randomized controlled trials having 1171 patients, thrice weekly insulin degludec had similar efficacy as daily insulin glargine injections with regards to the fasting blood glucose reduction, having similar safety and risk of low blood glucose (hypoglycaemia) profile. However the overall HbA1c reduction with thrice weekly insulin degludec injection was marginally lower than that of daily insulin glargine injections. Hence thrice weekly degludec injections can be considered in extremely needle prick phobic patients as a choice for basal insulin therapy.

== Side effects ==
A significant side effect of insulin therapy is hypoglycemia. A meta-analysis of clinical trials published in July 2012 found 39 to 47.9 events of hypoglycemia (defined as blood glucose <56 mg/dL) per patient year, with higher rates in the more concentrated degludec formulation. Rates of nocturnal hypoglycemia ranged from 3.7 to 5.1 events per patient year. A more recent Cochrane systematic review found there was no significant differences in rates of diurnal, nocturnal hypoglycemia or any other studies outcomes when using insulin degludec as compared to insulin glargine, insulin detemir and NPH insulin for the management of type 1 diabetes in either adults or children.

== Pharmacology ==
=== Mechanism of action ===
Insulin degludec is an ultra-long acting insulin that, unlike insulin glargine, is active at a physiologic pH. The addition of hexadecanedioic acid via an amide linkage to lysine at the B29 position allows for the formation of multi-hexamers in subcutaneous tissues. This allows for the formation of a subcutaneous depot that results in slow insulin release into the systemic circulation.

=== Pharmacokinetics ===
Insulin degludec has an onset of action of 30–90 minutes (similar to insulin glargine and insulin detemir). There is no peak in activity, due to the slow release into systemic circulation. The duration of action of insulin degludec is reported as being longer than 24 hours.

Because the half-life is longer than 24 hours, it is approved for daily dosing at any time each day - as long as more than 8 hours has elapsed since the previous dose. A missed dose is advised to be taken as soon as remembered, then return to a normal schedule.

== Effectiveness profile ==
Studies have shown that participants taking insulin degludec needed to take significantly smaller doses of basal insulin than those taking insulin glargine U100, while achieving similar blood glucose levels. However, in a systematic review no clinically significant differences in measures of effectiveness were found when using insulin degludec as compared to insulin glargine, insulin detemir, and NPH insulin for the management of type 1 diabetes in either adults or children. Insulin degludec also has the ability to be mixed with other insulins, thereby improving glycemic control. This cannot be done using other long-acting insulins. A physician involved in the trials was quoted as saying,

This allows the creation of a novel formulation that retains the smooth control of a long-acting basal with rapid-acting mealtime control from insulin aspart. This 2-component insulin retains the ultralow risk characteristics of degludec with simultaneous mealtime coverage.

== History ==
Insulin degludec has been filed for registration in the United States. After the completion of additional cardiac safety studies requested by the US Food and Drug Administration (FDA) in February 2013, it received FDA approval in September 2015 and marketing began in January 2016.

== Clinical trial data ==
=== Type 1 diabetes ===
Insulin degludec was studied as an alternative to insulin glargine as part of a basal-bolus regimen in the BEGIN Basal-Bolus Type 1 trial. 629 participants with type 1 diabetes were randomized in a 3:1 ratio to either insulin degludec (n=472) or insulin glargine (n=157) in addition to mealtime insulin aspart. Participants in the degludec treatment arm were switched from their basal insulin to insulin degludec in a 1:1 ratio, with a 20-30% dose reduction in participants receiving multiple basal doses per day. After 52 weeks, participants treated with insulin degludec produced a similar reduction in HbA1c (0.40% vs. 0.39%) meeting the criteria for noninferiority. Adverse events were similar in the two treatment arms; however, rates of nocturnal hypoglycemia (between midnight and 6am) were 27% lower in participants treated with insulin degludec (3.91 vs. 5.22 episodes per patient-year of exposure, p=0.024). The reduction in the incidence of hypoglycemia was seen as a therapeutic benefit, as hypoglycemia is often a dose limiting toxicity in insulin therapy.

A systematic review has compared the use of insulin degludec to that of insulin glargine, insulin detemir and NPH insulin in adults and children diagnosed with type 1 diabetes. This review included Randomized Control Trials (RCTs) with a duration of 24 to 104 weeks and had a total sample of 8784 participants randomized across studies: 2428 participants allocated to NPH insulin; 2889 participants to insulin detemir; 2095 participants to insulin glargine; 1372 participants to insulin degludec. 21% of all participants were children. No studies directly compared insulin degludec with NPH insulin. In the studies comparing insulin degludec to insulin detemir (2 RCTs) and insulin degludec to insulin glargine (4 RCTs), no clinically relevant difference was found for the outcomes of all-cause mortality, health-related quality of life (QoL), severe hypoglycemia, non-fatal myocardial infarction/stroke (NFMI/NFS), severe nocturnal hypoglycaemia, serious adverse effects (SAE) and Glycated haemoglobin A1c (HbA1c).

=== Type 2 diabetes ===
In the BEGIN Basal-Bolus Type 2 trial, insulin degludec was studied as an alternative to insulin glargine in participants with type 2 diabetes. 995 participants were randomized to receive either insulin degludec (n=755) or insulin glargine (n=251), in addition to either mealtime insulin aspart, metformin, and/or pioglitazone. Participants in this trial had an average HbA1c of 8.3–8.4%, and 49–50% were on a regimen consisting of basal-bolus insulin plus oral antidiabetic medications. After 52 weeks, insulin degludec was found to be noninferior to insulin glargine, providing a similar HbA1c lowering effect (−1.10 vs. −1.18%). Overall rates of hypoglycemia were significantly lower with insulin degludec (11.09 vs. 13.63%/yr, p=0.0359), including cases of nocturnal hypoglycemia (1.39 vs. 1.84%/yr, p=0.0399).

== Pharmacoeconomics ==
Given the treat-to-target nature of the BEGIN trial program, much of the health economic analysis of insulin degludec has focused on short-term cost-effectiveness based on differences in insulin dosing and hypoglycemic event incidence rather than differences in glycemic control. The first cost-effectiveness analysis of this nature was conducted from a societal perspective in the Swedish setting in 2013, finding that insulin degludec would be cost-effective relative to insulin glargine in the treatment of type 1 diabetes, and type 2 diabetes as part of either a basal or basal-insulin regimen.
