= Insulin (medication) =

Use of insulin protein and analogs as medical treatment

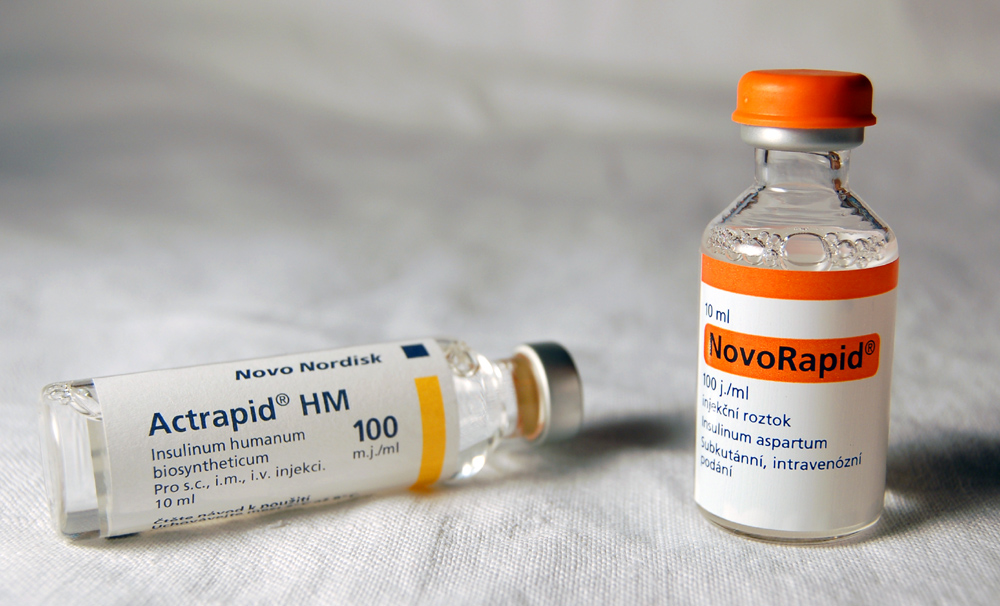
- Vials of insulin

Clinical data
- Trade names: Humulin, Novolin, Insuman, others
- AHFS/Drugs.com: Monograph
- MedlinePlus: a682611
- License data: US DailyMed: Human insulin
- Routes of administration: Subcutaneous, intravenous, intramuscular, inhalation
- ATC code: A10AD01 (WHO)

Legal status
- Legal status: CA: ℞-only / Schedule D; UK: POM (Prescription only); US: ℞-only / OTC; EU: Rx-only

Identifiers
- CAS Number: 9004-10-8
- PubChem CID: 70678557
- DrugBank: DB00030
- ChemSpider: 34999906
- UNII: 438UC14NDQ
- KEGG: D04477

Chemical and physical data
- Formula: C_{257}H_{383}N_{65}O_{77}S_{6}
- Molar mass: 5807.63 g·mol^{−1}
- Density: 1.09 g/cm^{3}
- Melting point: 233 °C (451 °F)

As a medication, insulin is any pharmaceutical preparation of the protein hormone insulin that is used to treat high blood glucose. Such conditions include type 1 diabetes, type 2 diabetes, gestational diabetes, and complications of diabetes such as diabetic ketoacidosis and hyperosmolar hyperglycemic states. Insulin is also used along with glucose to treat hyperkalemia (high blood potassium levels). Typically it is given by injection under the skin, but some forms may also be used by injection into a vein or muscle. There are various types of insulin, suitable for various time spans. The types are often all called insulin in the broad sense, although in a more precise sense, insulin is identical to the naturally occurring molecule whereas insulin analogues have slightly different molecules that allow for modified time of action. It is on the World Health Organization's List of Essential Medicines. In 2023, it was the 157th most commonly prescribed medication in the United States, with more than 3 million prescriptions.

Insulin can be made from the pancreas of pigs or cows. Human versions can be made either by modifying pig versions, or recombinant technology using mainly E. coli or Saccharomyces cerevisiae. It comes in three main types: short–acting (such as regular insulin), intermediate-acting (such as neutral protamine Hagedorn (NPH) insulin), and longer-acting (such as insulin glargine).

== Medical uses ==
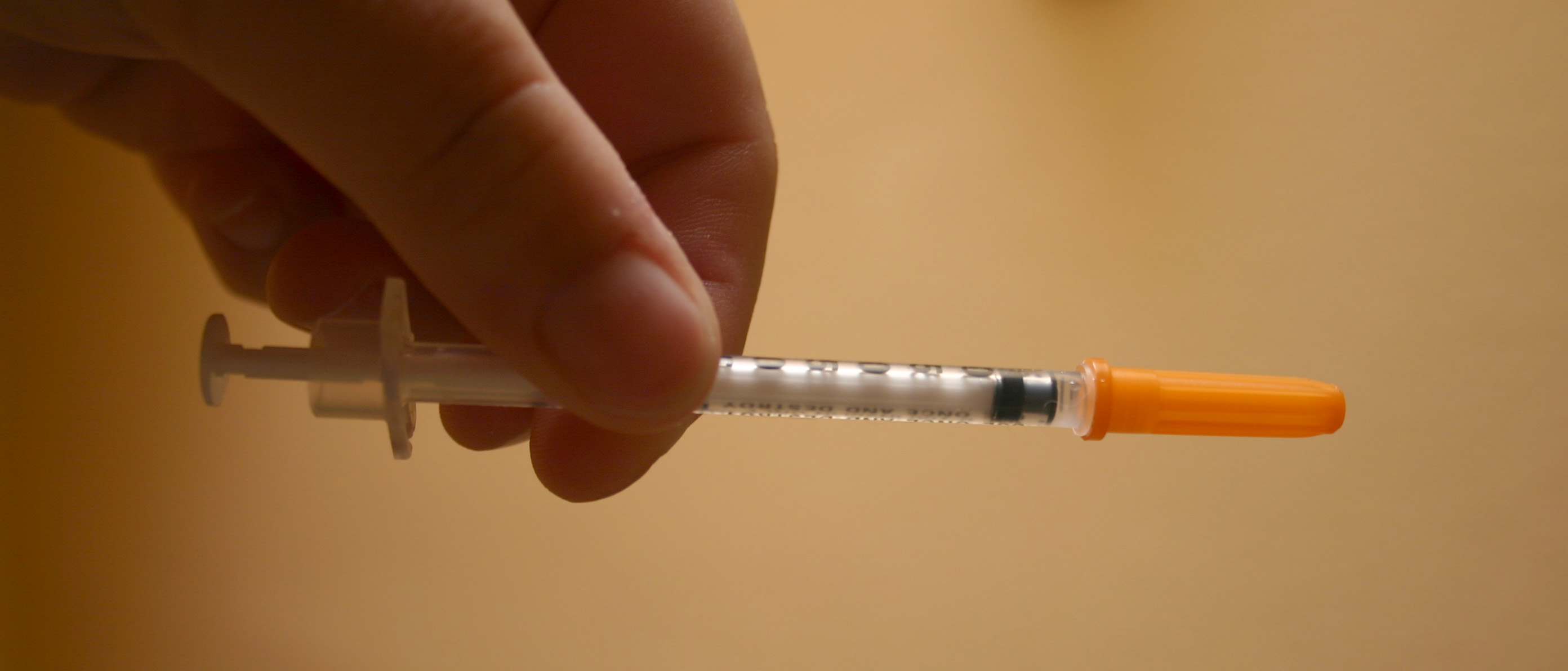
The current standard insulin syringe. It is a disposable plastic one-piece syringe with an integral needle and an orange needle cap (introduced by Becton-Dickinson in 1970). It is also a low dead space syringe.

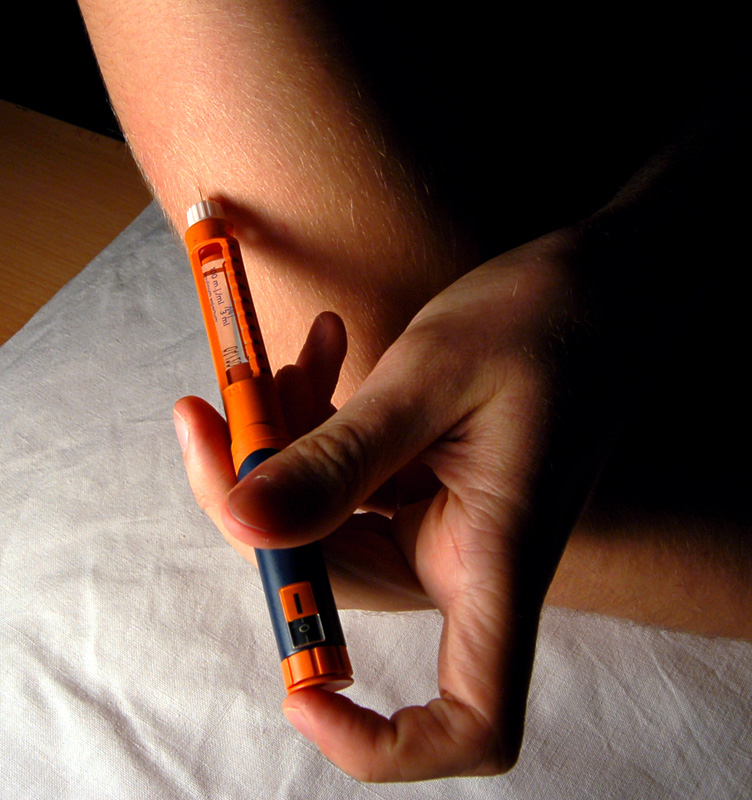
Giving insulin with an insulin pen.

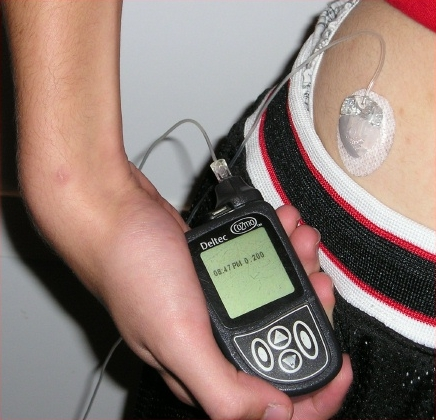
Insulin pump in use.

Insulin is used to treat a number of diseases including diabetes and its acute complications such as diabetic ketoacidosis and hyperosmolar hyperglycemic states. It is also used along with glucose to treat high blood potassium levels. Use during pregnancy is relatively safe for the baby. Insulin was formerly used in a psychiatric treatment called insulin shock therapy.

== Side effects ==
Some side effects are hypoglycemia (low blood sugar), hypokalemia (low blood potassium), and allergic reactions. Allergy to insulin affected about 2% of people, of which most reactions are not due to the insulin itself but to preservatives added to insulin such as zinc, protamine, and meta-cresol. Most reactions are Type I hypersensitivity reactions and rarely cause anaphylaxis. A suspected allergy to insulin can be confirmed by skin prick testing, patch testing and occasionally skin biopsy. First line therapy against insulin hypersensitivity reactions include symptomatic therapy with antihistamines. The affected persons are then switched to a preparation that does not contain the specific agent they are reacting to or undergo desensitization.

Cutaneous adverse effects

Other side effects may include pain or skin changes at the sites of injection. Repeated subcutaneous injection without site rotation can lead to lipohypertrophy and amyloidomas, which manifest as firm palpable nodules under the skin.

=== Effects of early routine use ===
Early initiation of insulin therapy for the long-term management of conditions such as type 2 diabetes would suggest that the use of insulin has unique benefits. However, with insulin therapy, there is a need to gradually raise the dose and the complexity of the regimen, as well as the likelihood of developing severe hypoglycemia. This is why many people and their doctors are hesitant to begin insulin therapy in the early stage of disease management. Many obstacles associated with health behaviors also prevent people with type 2 diabetes mellitus from starting or intensifying their insulin treatment, including lack of motivation, lack of familiarity with or experience with treatments, and time restraints causing people to have high glycemic loads for extended periods of time prior to starting insulin therapy. This is why managing the side effects associated with long-term early routine use of insulin for type 2 diabetes mellitus can prove to be a therapeutic and behavioral challenge.

== Principles ==
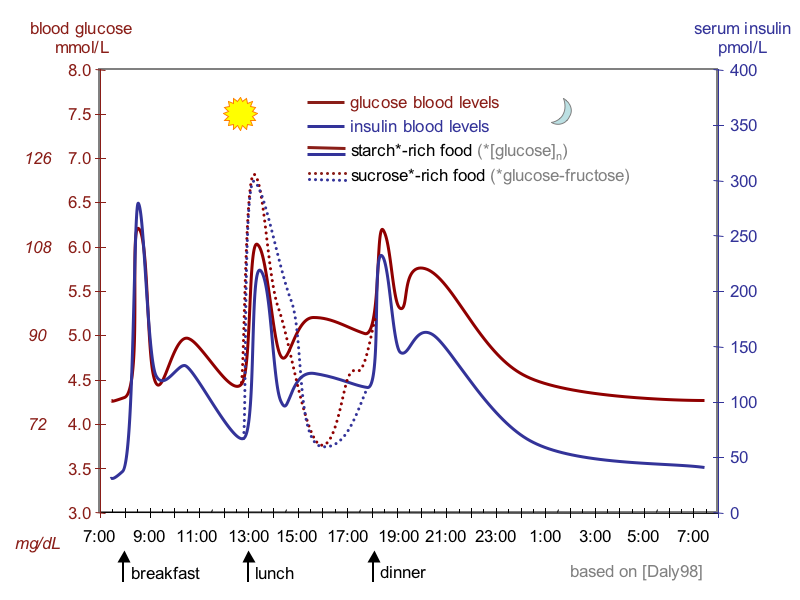
The idealised diagram shows the fluctuation of blood sugar (red) and the sugar-lowering hormone insulin (blue) in humans during the course of a day containing three meals. In addition, the effect of a sugar-rich versus a starch-rich meal is highlighted.

Amino Acid Sequence of Insulin Preparations
Amino Acid Substitutions
	A-Chain Position			B-Chain Position
Source Species	A-8	A-10	A-21	B-28	B-29	B-30	B-31 B-32
Bovine	Ala	Val	Asn	Pro	Lys	Ala	N/A
Porcine	Thr	Ile	Asn	Pro	Lys	Ala	N/A
Human	Thr	Ile	Asn	Pro	Lys	Thr	N/A
Aspart (Novolog)	Thr	Ile	Asn	Asp	Lys	Thr	N/A
Lispro (Humalog)	Thr	Ile	Asn	Lys	Pro	Thr	N/A
Glulisine (Apidra)	Thr	Ile	Asn	Pro	Glu	Thr	N/A
Glargine (Lantus)	Thr	Ilc	Gly	Pro	Lys	Thr	Arg
Detemir(Levemir)	Thr	Ile	Asn	Pro	Lys	N/A	Myristic acid
Degludec(Tresiba)	Thr	Ile	Asn	Pro	Lys	N/A	Hexadecanedioic acid
Ala=Alanine Val=Valine Asn=Asparagine Pro=Proline Lys=Lysine Thr=Threonine Ile=Isoleucine Glu=Glutamine Gly=Glycine

Insulin is an endogenous hormone, which is produced by the pancreas. The insulin protein has been highly conserved across evolutionary time, and is present in both mammals and invertebrates. The insulin/insulin-like growth factor signalling pathway (IIS) has been extensively studied in species including nematode worms (e.g.C. elegans), flies (Drosophila melanogaster) and mice (Mus musculus). Its mechanisms of action are highly similar across species.

Both type 1 diabetes and type 2 diabetes are marked by a loss of pancreatic function, though to differing degrees. People who are affected with diabetes are referred to as diabetics. Many diabetics require an exogenous source of insulin to keep their blood sugar levels within a safe target range.

In 1916, Nicolae C. Paulescu (1869–1931) succeeded in developing an aqueous pancreatic extract that normalized a diabetic dog. In 1921, he published 4 papers in the Society of Biology in Paris centering on the successful effects of the pancreatic extract in diabetic dogs. Research on the Role of the Pancreas in Food Assimilation by Paulescu was published in August 1921 in the Archives Internationales de Physiologie, Liège, Belgium. Initially, the only way to obtain insulin for clinical use was to extract it from the pancreas of another creature. Animal glands were obtainable as a waste product of the meatpacking industry. Insulin was derived primarily from cows (bovine) (Thorburn Brailsford Robertson (Australia); Eli Lilly and Company (USA)) and pigs (porcine) (Nordisk Insulinlaboratorium). The making of eight ounces of purified insulin could require as much as two tons of pig parts. Insulin from these sources is effective in humans as it is highly similar to human insulin (three amino acid difference in bovine insulin, one amino acid difference in porcine). Initially, lower preparation purity resulted in allergic reactions to the presence of non-insulin substances. Purity has improved steadily since the 1920s ultimately reaching purity of 99% by the mid-1970s thanks to high-pressure liquid chromatography (HPLC) methods. Minor allergic reactions still occur occasionally, even to synthetic "human" insulin varieties.

Beginning in 1982, biosynthetic "human" insulin has been manufactured for clinical use through genetic engineering techniques using recombinant DNA technology. Genentech developed the technique used to produce the first such insulin, Humulin, but did not commercially market the product themselves. Eli Lilly marketed Humulin in 1982. Humulin was the first medication produced using modern genetic engineering techniques in which actual human DNA is inserted into a host cell (E. coli in this case). The host cells are then allowed to grow and reproduce normally, and due to the inserted human DNA, they produce a synthetic version of human insulin. Manufacturers claim this reduces the presence of many impurities. However, the clinical preparations prepared from such insulins differ from endogenous human insulin in several important respects; an example is the absence of C-peptide which has in recent years been shown to have systemic effects itself. Novo Nordisk has also developed a genetically engineered insulin independently using a yeast process.

According to a survey that the International Diabetes Federation conducted in 2002 on the access to and availability of insulin in its member countries, approximately 70% of the insulin that is currently sold in the world is recombinant, biosynthetic 'human' insulin. A majority of insulin used clinically today is produced this way, although clinical experience has provided conflicting evidence on whether these insulins are any less likely to produce an allergic reaction. Adverse reactions have been reported; these include loss of warning signs that patients may slip into a coma through hypoglycemia, convulsions, memory lapse and loss of concentration. However, the International Diabetes Federation's position statement from 2005 is very clear in stating that "there is NO overwhelming evidence to prefer one species of insulin over another" and "[modern, highly purified] animal insulins remain a perfectly acceptable alternative."

Since January 2006, all insulins distributed in the US and some other countries are synthetic "human" insulins or their analogues. A special FDA importation process is required to obtain bovine or porcine derived insulin for use in the US, although there may be some remaining stocks of porcine insulin made by Lilly in 2005 or earlier, and porcine lente insulin is also sold and marketed under the brand name Vetsulin(SM) in the US for veterinary usage in the treatment of companion animals with diabetes.

=== Basal insulin ===
In type 1 diabetes, endogenous insulin production is extremely low or absent, and as such the body requires exogenous insulin. Some people with type 2 diabetes, particularly those with very high hemoglobin A1c values, may also require a baseline rate of exogenous insulin, as their body is desensitized to the level of insulin being produced by their body. Basal insulin regulates the body's blood glucose between mealtimes, as well as overnight. This basal rate of insulin action is generally achieved via the use of an intermediate-acting insulin (such as NPH) or a long-acting insulin analog. In type 1 diabetics, it may also be achieved via continuous infusion of rapid-acting insulin using an insulin pump. Approximately half of a person's daily insulin requirement is administered as a basal insulin, usually administered once per day at night.

=== Prandial insulin ===
When a person eats food containing carbohydrates and glucose, insulin helps regulate the body's metabolism of the food. Prandial insulin, also called mealtime or bolus insulin, is designed as a bolus dose of insulin prior to a meal to regulate the spike in blood glucose that occurs following a meal. The dose of prandial insulin may be static, or may be calculated by the patient using either their current blood sugar, planned carbohydrate intake, or both. This calculation may also be performed by an insulin pump in patients using a pump. Insulin regiments that consist of doses calculated in this manner are considered intensive insulin regimens. Prandial insulin is usually administered no more than 15–30 minutes prior to a meal using a rapid-acting insulin or a regular insulin. In some patients, a combination insulin may be used that contains both NPH (long acting) insulin and a rapid/regular insulin to provide both a basal insulin and prandial insulin.

== Challenges in treatment ==
There are several challenges involved in the use of insulin as a clinical treatment for diabetes:

- Mode of administration.
- Selecting the 'right' dose and timing. The amount of carbohydrates one unit of insulin handles varies widely between persons and over the day but values between 7 and 20 grams per 1 IE is typical.
- Selecting an appropriate insulin preparation (typically on 'speed of onset and duration of action' grounds).
- Adjusting dosage and timing to fit food intake timing, amounts, and types.
- Adjusting dosage and timing to fit exercise undertaken.
- Adjusting dosage, type, and timing to fit other conditions, for instance the increased stress of illness.
- Variability in absorption into the bloodstream via subcutaneous delivery
- The dosage is non-physiological in that a subcutaneous bolus dose of insulin alone is administered instead of combination of insulin and C-peptide being released gradually and directly into the portal vein.
- It is simply a nuisance for people to inject whenever they eat carbohydrates or have a high blood glucose reading.
- It is dangerous in case of mistake (such as 'too much' insulin).

== Types ==
Medical preparations of insulin mix the peptide hormone with preservatives that adjust the pH and delay denaturation and absorption. Insulin analogues retain the hormone's function while providing improved absorption and biochemical activity. characteristics not currently possible with subcutaneously injected insulin proper. Insulin lispro, insulin aspart, and insulin glulisine are analogues that are rapidly absorbed to mimic real beta cell-produced insulin, while insulin detemir and insulin glargine are steadily absorbed to avoid a rapid decline in insulin action. However, meta-analyses conducted by Cochrane in 2005, Germany's Institute for Quality and Cost Effectiveness in the Health Care Sector [IQWiG] in 2007, and Canadian Agency for Drugs and Technology in Health (CADTH) also in 2007 have consistently shown that insulin analogues provide no clinical advantage over conventional insulin. However, insulin analogues are more temperature-resistant than human insulin, so they are preferred for clinical use in regions with limited refrigeration and extreme heat.

Commonly used types of insulin are differentiated by the speed of their biochemical activity. Fast/rapid-acting insulin includes insulin analogues aspart, lispro, and glulisine. These begin to work within 5 to 15 minutes and are active for 3 to 4 hours. Most insulins form hexamers, which delay entry into the blood in active form; these analog insulins do not but have normal insulin activity. Newer varieties are now pending regulatory approval in the US which are designed to work rapidly, but retain the same genetic structure as regular human insulin. Short-acting insulin includes regular insulin, which begins working within 30 minutes and is active about 5 to 8 hours. Intermediate-acting insulin includes NPH insulin, which begins working in 1 to 3 hours and is active for 16 to 24 hours.

Long-acting insulin includes the analogues glargine U100 and detemir, each of which begins working within 1 to 2 hours and continues to be active, without major peaks or dips, for about 24 hours, although this varies in many individuals. Ultra-long acting insulin includes the analogues insulin glargine U300 and degludec, which begin working within 30 to 90 minutes and continues to be active for greater than 24 hours. Newer long-acting insulins, like insulin icodec and insulin efsitora alfa, are designed for once-weekly use. Studies show they provide similar blood sugar control to daily insulins, with a comparable risk of hypoglycemia, while offering a simpler dosing routine. Combination insulin products combine fast- and short-acting insulin with a longer-acting insulin like NPH insulin. The combination products begin to work with the shorter-acting insulin (5–15 minutes for fast-acting, and 30 minutes for short-acting), and remain active for 16–24 hours. There are several variations with different proportions of the mixed insulins (e.g., Novolog Mix 70/30 contains 70% aspart protamine [akin to NPH], and 30% aspart).

== Methods of administration ==
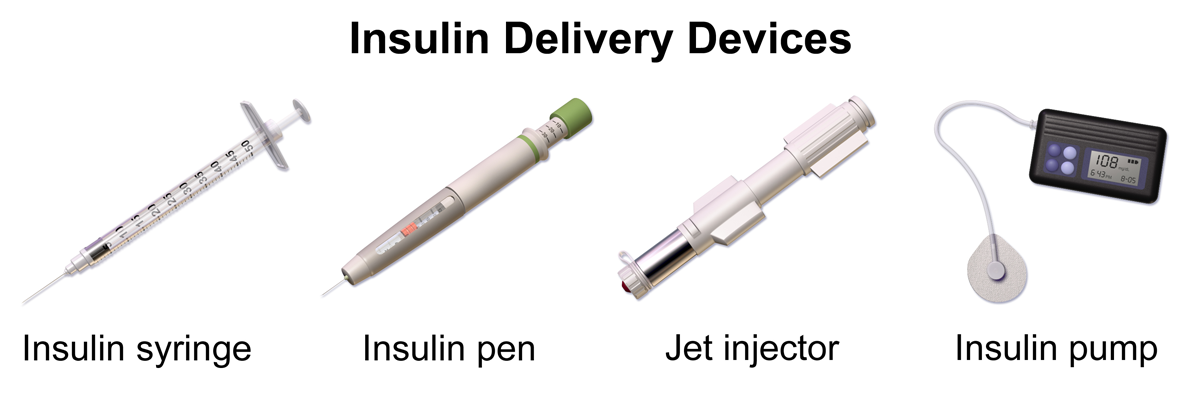
Insulin delivery devices

Unlike many medicines, insulin cannot be taken orally at the present time. Like nearly all other proteins introduced into the gastrointestinal tract, it is reduced to fragments (single amino acid components), whereupon all activity is lost. There has been some research into ways to protect insulin from the digestive tract, so that it can be administered in a pill. So far this is entirely experimental.

=== Subcutaneous ===
Insulin is usually taken as subcutaneous injections by single-use syringes with needles, an insulin pump, or by repeated-use insulin pens with needles. People who wish to reduce repeated skin puncture of insulin injections often use an injection port in conjunction with syringes.

The use of subcutaneous injections of insulin is designed to mimic the natural physiological cycle of insulin secretion, while taking into account the various properties of the formulations used such as half-life, onset of action, and duration of action. In many people, both a rapid- or short-acting insulin product as well as an intermediate- or long-acting product are used to decrease the amount of injections per day. In some, insulin injections may be combined with other injection therapy such as incretin mimetics (eg, semaglutide). Cleansing of the injection site and injection technique are required to ensure effective insulin therapy.

=== Insulin pump ===
Insulin pumps are a reasonable solution for some. Advantages to the person are better control over background or basal insulin dosage, bolus doses calculated to fractions of a unit, and calculators in the pump that may help with determining bolus infusion dosages. The limitations are cost, the potential for hypoglycemic and hyperglycemic episodes, catheter problems, and no "closed loop" means of controlling insulin delivery based on current blood glucose levels.

Insulin pumps may be like 'electrical injectors' attached to a temporarily implanted catheter or cannula. Some who cannot achieve adequate glucose control by conventional (or jet) injection are able to do so with the appropriate pump.

Indwelling catheters pose the risk of infection and ulceration, and some peoples may also develop lipodystrophy due to the infusion sets. These risks can often be minimized by keeping infusion sites clean. Insulin pumps require care and effort to use correctly.

== Dosage and timing ==
=== Dosage units ===
One international unit of insulin (1 IU) is defined as the "biological equivalent" of 34.7 μg pure crystalline insulin.

The first definition of a unit of insulin was the amount required to induce hypoglycemia in a rabbit. This was set by James Collip at the University of Toronto in 1922. Of course, this was dependent on the size and diet of the rabbits. The unit of insulin was set by the insulin committee at the University of Toronto. The unit evolved eventually to the old USP insulin unit, where one unit (U) of insulin was set equal to the amount of insulin required to reduce the concentration of blood glucose in a fasting rabbit to 45 m g/d L (2.5 m mol/L). Once the chemical structure and mass of insulin was known, the unit of insulin was defined by the mass of pure crystalline insulin required to obtain the USP unit.

The unit of measurement used in insulin therapy is not part of the International System of Units (abbreviated SI) which is the modern form of the metric system. Instead the pharmacological international unit (IU) is defined by the WHO Expert Committee on Biological Standardization.

=== Potential complications ===
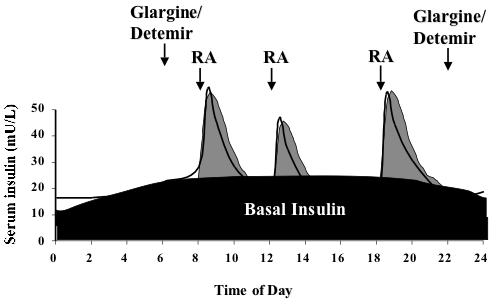
Diagram explaining the basal-bolus insulin schedule. The long acting insulin is given once (usually glargine, Lantus) or twice (usually detemir, Levemir) daily to provide a base, or basal insulin level. Rapid acting (RA) insulin is given before meals and snacks. A similar profile can be provided using an insulin pump where rapid acting insulin is given as the basal and premeal bolus insulin.

The central problem for those requiring external insulin is picking the right dose of insulin and the right timing.

Physiological regulation of blood glucose, as in the non-diabetic, would be best. Increased blood glucose levels after a meal is a stimulus for prompt release of insulin from the pancreas. The increased insulin level causes glucose absorption and storage in cells, reduces glycogen to glucose conversion, reducing blood glucose levels, and so reducing insulin release. The result is that the blood glucose level rises somewhat after eating, and within an hour or so, returns to the normal 'fasting' level. Even the best diabetic treatment with synthetic human insulin or even insulin analogs, however administered, falls far short of normal glucose control in the non-diabetic.

Complicating matters is that the composition of the food eaten (see glycemic index) affects intestinal absorption rates. Glucose from some foods is absorbed more (or less) rapidly than the same amount of glucose in other foods. In addition, fats and proteins cause delays in absorption of glucose from carbohydrates eaten at the same time. As well, exercise reduces the need for insulin even when all other factors remain the same, since working muscle has some ability to take up glucose without the help of insulin.

Because of the complex and interacting factors, it is, in principle, impossible to know for certain how much insulin (and which type) is needed to 'cover' a particular meal to achieve a reasonable blood glucose level within an hour or two after eating. Non-diabetics' beta cells routinely and automatically manage this by continual glucose level monitoring and insulin release. All such decisions by a diabetic must be based on experience and training (i.e., at the direction of a physician, PA, or in some places a specialist diabetic educator) and, further, specifically based on the individual experience of the person. But it is not straightforward and should never be done by habit or routine. With some care however, it can be done reasonably well in clinical practice. For example, some people with diabetes require more insulin after drinking skim milk than they do after taking an equivalent amount of fat, protein, carbohydrate, and fluid in some other form. Their particular reaction to skimmed milk is different from other people with diabetes, but the same amount of whole milk is likely to cause a still different reaction even in that person. Whole milk contains considerable fat while skimmed milk has much less. It is a continual balancing act for all people with diabetes, especially for those taking insulin.

People with insulin-dependent diabetes typically require some base level of insulin (basal insulin), as well as short-acting insulin to cover meals (bolus also known as mealtime or prandial insulin). Maintaining the basal rate and the bolus rate is a continuous balancing act that people with insulin-dependent diabetes must manage each day. This is normally achieved through regular blood tests, although continuous blood sugar testing equipment (Continuous Glucose Monitors or CGMs) are now becoming available which could help to refine this balancing act once widespread usage becomes common.

=== Strategies ===
A long-acting insulin is used to approximate the basal secretion of insulin by the pancreas, which varies in the course of the day. NPH/isophane, lente, ultralente, glargine, and detemir may be used for this purpose. The advantage of NPH is its low cost, the fact that you can mix it with short-acting forms of insulin, thereby minimizing the number of injections that must be administered, and that the activity of NPH will peak 4–6 hours after administration, allowing a bedtime dose to balance the tendency of glucose to rise with the dawn, along with a smaller morning dose to balance the lower afternoon basal need and possibly an afternoon dose to cover evening need. A disadvantage of bedtime NPH is that if not taken late enough (near midnight) to place its peak shortly before dawn, it has the potential of causing hypoglycemia. One theoretical advantage of glargine and detemir is that they only need to be administered once a day, although in practice many people find that neither lasts a full 24 hours. They can be administered at any time during the day as well, provided that they are given at the same time every day. Another advantage of long-acting insulins is that the basal component of an insulin regimen (providing a minimum level of insulin throughout the day) can be decoupled from the prandial or bolus component (providing mealtime coverage via ultra-short-acting insulins), while regimens using NPH and regular insulin have the disadvantage that any dose adjustment affects both basal and prandial coverage. Glargine and detemir are significantly more expensive than NPH, lente and ultralente, and they cannot be mixed with other forms of insulin.

A short-acting insulin is used to simulate the endogenous insulin surge produced in anticipation of eating. Regular insulin, lispro, aspart and glulisine can be used for this purpose. Regular insulin should be given with about a 30-minute lead-time prior to the meal to be maximally effective and to minimize the possibility of hypoglycemia. Lispro, aspart and glulisine are approved for dosage with the first bite of the meal, and may even be effective if given after completing the meal. The short-acting insulin is also used to correct hyperglycemia.

==== Sliding scales ====
First described in 1934, what physicians typically refer to as sliding-scale insulin (SSI) is fast- or rapid-acting insulin only, given subcutaneously, typically at meal times and sometimes bedtime, but only when blood glucose is above a threshold (e.g. 10 mmol/L, 180 mg/dL). The so-called "sliding-scale" method is widely taught, although it has been heavily criticized. Sliding scale insulin (SSI) is not an effective way of managing long-term diabetes in individuals residing in nursing homes. Sliding scale insulin leads to greater discomfort and increased nursing time.

Sample regimen using insulin NPH and regular insulin
	before breakfast	before lunch	before dinner	at bedtime
NPH dose	12 units		6 units	
regular insulin dose if fingerstick glucose is (mg/dL) [mmol/L]:				
70–100 [3.9–5.5]	4 units		4 units	
101–150 [5.6–8.3]	5 units		5 units	
151–200 [8.4–11.1]	6 units		6 units	
201–250 [11.2–13.9]	7 units		7 units	
251–300 [14.0–16.7]	8 units	1 unit	8 units	1 unit
>300 [>16.7]	9 units	2 units	9 units	2 units

Sample regimen using insulin glargine and insulin lispro:

- Insulin glargine: 20 units at bedtime

Insulin lispro to be given as follows:
if fingerstick glucose is (mg/dL) [mmol/L]:	before breakfast	before lunch	before dinner	at bedtime
70–100 [3.9–5.5]	5 units	5 units	5 units	
101–150 [5.6–8.3]	6 units	6 units	6 units	
151–200 [8.4–11.1]	7 units	7 units	7 units	
201–250 [11.2–13.9]	8 units	8 units	8 units	1 unit
251–300 [14.0–16.7]	9 units	9 units	9 units	2 units
>300 [>16.7]	10 units	10 units	10 units	3 units

== Use in pregnancy ==
During pregnancy, spontaneous hyperglycemia can develop and lead to gestational diabetes mellitus (GDM), a frequent pregnancy complication. With a prevalence of 6-20% among pregnant women globally, gestational diabetes mellitus (GDM) is defined as any degree of glucose intolerance developing or initially recognized during pregnancy. Neutral protamine Hagedorn (NPH) insulin has been the cornerstone of insulin therapy during pregnancy, administered two to four times per day. Women with GDM and pregnant women with type I diabetes mellitus who frequently check their blood glucose levels and utilize glucose monitoring equipment for doing so, use continuous insulin infusion of a rapid-acting insulin analogue, such as lispro and aspart. However, a number of considerations go into choosing a regimen for administering insulin to patients. When managing GDM in pregnant women, these guidelines are crucial and can vary depending on certain physiological and interestingly the sociocultural environment as well. The current perinatal guidelines recommend a low daily dose of insulin and take into account the woman's physiological features and the frequency of self-monitoring. The importance of using specialized insulin therapy planning based on parameters like those stated above rather than a broad approach is emphasized.

Women with pre-existing diabetes have the highest levels of insulin sensitivity early in pregnancy. Close glucose monitoring is required to prevent hypoglycemia, which can potentially result in altered consciousness, seizures, and maternal damage. Low birth weight newborns might also be the result of hypoglycemia, especially in patients with type 1 diabetes, because they are frequently more insulin sensitive than persons with type 2 diabetes and more likely to be unaware of their hypoglycemic state. Close glucose monitoring is essential because after 16 weeks of pregnancy, women with preexisting diabetes become more insulin resistant and their insulin demands may fluctuate weekly. The need for insulin may rise from one pregnancy to the next. Therefore, it is realistic to expect higher needs for glucose control with subsequent pregnancies in multiparous women.

== As a performance-enhancing drug ==
The possibility of using insulin in an attempt to improve athletic performance was suggested as early as the 1998 Winter Olympics in Nagano, Japan, as reported by Peter Sönksen in the July 2001 issue of Journal of Endocrinology. The question of whether non-diabetic athletes could legally use insulin was raised by a Russian medical officer. Whether insulin would actually improve athletic performance is unclear, but concerns about its use led the International Olympic Committee to ban use of the hormone by non-diabetic athletes in 1998.

The book Game of Shadows (2001), by reporters Mark Fainaru-Wada and Lance Williams, included allegations that baseball player Barry Bonds used insulin (as well as other drugs) in the apparent belief that it would increase the effectiveness of the growth hormone he was alleged to be taking. Bonds eventually testified in front of a federal grand jury as part of a government investigation of BALCO.

Bodybuilders in particular are claimed to be using exogenous insulin and other drugs in the belief that they will increase muscle mass. Bodybuilders have been described as injecting up to 10 IU of regular synthetic insulin before eating sugary meals. A 2008 report suggested that insulin is sometimes used in combination with anabolic steroids and growth hormone (GH), and that "Athletes are exposing themselves to potential harm by self‐administering large doses of GH, IGF‐I and insulin". Insulin abuse has been mentioned as a possible factor in the deaths of bodybuilders Ghent Wakefield and Rich Piana.

=== Insulin effects on strength and exercise performance ===
Exogenous insulin significantly boosts the rate of glucose metabolism in training athletes along with a substantial increase in the peak V̇O2. Insulin is thought to enhance performance by increasing protein synthesis, reducing protein catabolism, and facilitating the transfer of certain amino acids in human skeletal muscle. Insulin-treated athletes are perceived to have lean body mass because physiological hyperinsulinemia in human skeletal muscle improves the activity of amino acid transport, which in turn promotes protein synthesis. Insulin stimulates the transport of amino acids into cells and also controls glucose metabolism. It decreases lipolysis and increases lipogenesis which is why bodybuilders and athletes use rhGH in conjunction with it as to offset this negative effect while maximizing protein synthesis. The athletes extrapolated the physiology of the diabetic patient in the sporting arena because they are interested in the suppression of proteolysis. Insulin administration is found to be protein anabolic in the insulin-resistant state of chronic renal failure. It inhibits proteolysis and when administered along with amino acids, it enhances net protein synthesis. Exogenous insulin injection creates an in-vivo hyperinsulinemic clamp, boosting muscle glycogen before and during the recovery phases of intense exercise. Power, strength, and stamina are all expected to increase as a result, and it might also speed up the healing process after intense physical activity. Second, insulin is expected to increase muscle mass by preventing the breakdown of muscle protein when consumed along with a high carb-protein diet. Although a limited number of studies do suggest that insulin medication can be abused as a pharmacological treatment to boost strength and performance in young, healthy people or athletes, a recent assessment of the research argues that this is only applicable to a small group of "drug-naïve" individuals.

== Abuse ==
The abuse of exogenous insulin carries with it an attendant risk of hypoglycemic coma and death when the amount used is in excess of that required to handle ingested carbohydrate. Acute risks include brain damage, paralysis, and death. Symptoms may include dizziness, weakness, trembling, palpitations, seizures, confusion, headache, drowsiness, coma, diaphoresis and nausea. All persons with overdoses should be referred for medical assessment and treatment, which may last for hours or days.

Data from the US National Poison Data System (2013) indicates that 89.3% of insulin cases reported to poison centers are unintentional, as a result of therapeutic error. Another 10% of cases are intentional, and may reflect attempted suicide, abuse, criminal intent, secondary gain or other unknown reasons. Hypoglycemia that has been induced by exogenous insulin can be chemically detected by examining the ratio of insulin to C-peptide in peripheral circulation. It has been suggested that this type of approach could be used to detect exogenous insulin abuse by athletes.

== Detection in biological fluids ==
Insulin is often measured in serum, plasma or blood in order to monitor therapy in people who are diabetic, confirm a diagnosis of poisoning in hospitalized persons or assist in a medicolegal investigation of suspicious death. Interpretation of the resulting insulin concentrations is complex, given the numerous types of insulin available, various routes of administration, the presence of anti-insulin antibodies in insulin-dependent diabetics and the ex vivo instability of the drug. Other potential confounding factors include the wide-ranging cross-reactivity of commercial insulin immunoassays for the biosynthetic insulin analogs, the use of high-dose intravenous insulin as an antidote to antihypertensive drug over dosage and postmortem redistribution of insulin within the body. The use of a chromatographic technique for insulin assay may be preferable to immunoassay in some circumstances, to avoid the issue of cross-reactivity affecting the quantitative result and also to assist identifying the specific type of insulin in the specimen.

== Combination with other antidiabetic drugs ==
A combination therapy of insulin and other antidiabetic drugs appears to be most beneficial in people who are diabetic, who still have residual insulin secretory capacity. A combination of insulin therapy and sulfonylurea is more effective than insulin alone in treating people with type 2 diabetes after secondary failure to oral drugs, leading to better glucose profiles or decreased insulin needs.

== History ==
Banting and Macleod's 1923 Nobel Prize for Physiology or Medicine (Diploma): "for the discovery of insulin".

Insulin was first used as a medication in Canada by Charles Best and Frederick Banting in 1922.

This is a chronology of key milestones in the history of the medical use of insulin. For more details on the discovery, extraction, purification, clinical use, and synthesis of insulin, see Insulin

- 1921 Research on the role of pancreas in the nutritive assimilation
- 1922 Frederick Banting, Charles Best and James Collip use bovine insulin extract in humans at Connaught Laboratories in Toronto, Canada.
- 1922 Leonard Thompson becomes the first human to be treated with insulin.
- 1922 James D. Havens, son of former congressman James S. Havens, becomes the first American to be treated with insulin.
- 1922 Elizabeth Hughes Gossett, daughter of the US Secretary of State, becomes the first American to be (officially) treated in Toronto.
- 1923 Dr. Trent Champion de Crespigny delivers the first treatments with insulin produced in Australia, to a 9-year-old, in Adelaide, South Australia, on 7 January 1923.
- 1923 Eli Lilly produces commercial quantities of much purer bovine insulin than Banting et al. had used
- 1923 Farbwerke Hoechst, one of the forerunners of today's Sanofi Aventis, produces commercial quantities of bovine insulin in Germany
- 1923 Hans Christian Hagedorn founds the Nordisk Insulinlaboratorium in Denmark – forerunner of today's Novo Nordisk
- 1923 Constance Collier returns to health after being successfully treated with insulin in Strasbourg
- 1924 Margaret Cheadle, a research biochemist in the laboratory of T. Brailsford Robertson at the University of Adelaide, determined that approx. 167 "mouse units" of insulin were "equivalent to one two-kilogram rabbit-unit".
- 1926 Nordisk receives a Danish charter to produce insulin as a non-profit
- 1936 Canadians David M. Scott and Albert M. Fisher formulate a zinc insulin mixture at Connaught Laboratories in Toronto and license it to Novo
- 1936 Hagedorn discovers that adding protamine to insulin prolongs the duration of action of insulin
- 1946 Nordisk formulates Isophane porcine insulin aka Neutral Protamine Hagedorn or NPH insulin
- 1946 Nordisk crystallizes a protamine and insulin mixture
- 1950 Nordisk markets NPH insulin
- 1953 Novo formulates Lente porcine and bovine insulins by adding zinc for longer lasting insulin
- 1955 Frederick Sanger determines the amino acid sequence of insulin
- 1965 Synthesized by total synthesis by Wang Yinglai, Chen-Lu Tsou, et al.
- 1969 Dorothy Crowfoot Hodgkin characterizes and describes the crystal structure of insulin by X-ray crystallography
- 1973 Purified monocomponent (MC) insulin is introduced
- 1973 The US officially "standardized" insulin sold for human use in the US to U-100 (100 units per milliliter). Prior to that, insulin was sold in different strengths, including U-80 (80 units per milliliter) and U-40 formulations (40 units per milliliter), so the effort to "standardize" the potency aimed to reduce dosage errors and ease doctors' job of prescribing insulin for people. Other countries also followed suit.
- 1978 Genentech produces biosynthetic human insulin in Escherichia coli bacteria using recombinant DNA techniques, licenses to Eli Lilly
- 1981 Novo Nordisk chemically and enzymatically converts porcine to human insulin
- 1982 Genentech synthetic human insulin (above) approved
- 1983 Eli Lilly and Company produces biosynthetic human insulin with recombinant DNA technology, Humulin
- 1985 Axel Ullrich sequences a human cell membrane insulin receptor.
- 1988 Novo Nordisk produces recombinant biosynthetic human insulin
- 1996 Lilly Humalog "lispro" insulin analogue approved.
- 2000 Sanofi Aventis Lantus insulin "glargine" analogue approved for clinical use in the US and the EU.
- 2004 Sanofi Aventis Apidra insulin "glulisine" insulin analogue approved for clinical use in the US.
- 2006 Novo Nordisk Levemir "detemir" insulin analogue approved for clinical use in the US.
- 2008 Abbott laboratories " FreeStyle Navigator CGM" gets approved.
- 2013 The US Food and Drug Administration (FDA) requested more cardiac safety tests for Insulin degludec.
- 2015 Insulin degludec was approved by the FDA in September 2015.

== Society and culture ==
=== Economics ===
==== United States ====
The price of insulin in the United States dramatically increased from 1991 to 2019, prompting state governments to sue pharmaceutical companies over alleged price fixing. In 2019, the House Committee on Energy and Commerce questioned how the annual cost of insulin for treating Type 1 diabetes rose to $5,705 by 2019 ($7,184 in 2025), which was up to six times higher than prices in other countries. In 2020, President Donald Trump established the Part D Senior Savings Model for some Medicare Part D plans to offer insulin at $35 or less per month. In 2022, President Joe Biden signed the Inflation Reduction Act, requiring all Part D plans to adopt this price ceiling and cost sharing under Medicare Part B to follow the same threshold. In 2022, California allocated $100 million for the state to create its own insulin at a close-to-cost price.

==== Canada ====
Canada, like many other industrialized countries, has price controls on the cost of pharmaceuticals. The Patented Medicine Prices Review Board ensures the price of patented medicine sold in Canada is "not excessive" and remains "comparable with prices in other countries."

==== United Kingdom ====
Insulin, and all other medications, are supplied free of charge to people who use it to manage their diabetes by the National Health Services of the countries of the United Kingdom.

==== Sweden ====
All types of insulin is free of charge to patients with insulin-treated diabetes. This includes peripherals for insulin administration as well as blood glucose monitoring devices.

=== Regulatory status ===
==== United States ====
In March 2020, the FDA changed the regulatory pathway for approval of new insulin products. Insulin is regulated as a biologic rather than as a drug. The changed status gives the FDA more flexibility for approval and labeling. In July 2021, the FDA approved insulin glargine-yfgn (Semglee), a biosimilar product that contains the long acting analog insulin glargine. Insulin glargine-yfgn is interchangeable and less expensive than the reference product, insulin glargine (Lantus), which had been approved in 2000. The FDA requires that new insulin products are not inferior to existing insulin products with respect to reduction in hemoglobin A1c.

== Research ==
=== Inhalation ===
In 2006, the US Food and Drug Administration (FDA) approved the use of Exubera, the first inhalable insulin. It was withdrawn from the market by its maker in 2007 due to lack of acceptance.

Inhaled insulin claimed to have similar efficacy to injected insulin, both in terms of controlling glucose levels and blood half-life. Currently, inhaled insulin is short-acting and is typically taken before meals; an injection of long-acting insulin at night is often still required. When people were switched from injected to inhaled insulin, no significant difference was observed in Hb_{A1c} levels over three months. Accurate dosing was a particular problem, although people showed no significant weight gain or pulmonary function decline over the length of the trial when compared to the baseline.

Following its commercial launch in 2005 in the United Kingdom, it was not (as of July 2006) recommended by National Institute for Health and Clinical Excellence for routine use, except in cases where there is "proven injection phobia diagnosed by a psychiatrist or psychologist".

In January 2008, the world's largest insulin manufacturer, Novo Nordisk, also announced that the company was discontinuing all further development of the company's own version of inhalable insulin, known as the AERx iDMS inhaled insulin system. Similarly, Eli Lilly and Company ended its efforts to develop its inhaled Air Insulin in March 2008. Afrezza, developed by Mannkind, was authorized by the FDA in June 2014 for use in adults with Type 1 and Type 2 diabetes, with a label restriction limiting its use only to those who also have asthma, active lung cancer, or chronic obstructive pulmonary disease (COPD). Rapid-acting inhaled insulin is a component of the drug-device combination solution that is used at the start of every meal. It employs technosphere technology, which appears to have a more practical delivery method and more dosing flexibility, and a new inhaled insulin formulation (2.5 m). A thumb-sized inhaler with improved dosage flexibility is used to deliver inhalable insulin. It includes powder-dissolved recombinant human insulin (fumaryl diketopiperazine). Technosphere insulin is quickly absorbed by the lung surface after inhalation. Within 12 hours of inhalation, both substances—insulin, and powder (fumaryl diketopiperazine)—are virtually eliminated from healthy people's lungs. In comparison to Exubera (8–9%), just 0.3% of inhaled insulin was still present in the lungs after 12 hours. However, since serum antibody levels have been reported to increase without substantial clinical changes, acute bronchospasm in asthmatic and COPD patients along with a significant reduction in Diffusing Lung Capacity for Carbon Monoxide, in comparison to subcutaneous insulin, have been reported with its usage, Afrezza was given FDA approval with a warning (Risk Evaluation and Mitigation Strategy).

=== Transdermal ===
There are several methods for transdermal delivery of insulin. Pulsatile insulin uses microjets to pulse insulin into the person, mimicking the physiological secretions of insulin by the pancreas. Jet injection had different insulin delivery peaks and durations as compared to needle injection. Some diabetics may prefer jet injectors to hypodermic injection. Both electricity using iontophoresis and ultrasound have been found to make the skin temporarily porous. The insulin administration aspect remains experimental, but the blood glucose test aspect of "wrist appliances" is commercially available Researchers have produced a watch-like device that tests for blood glucose levels through the skin and administers corrective doses of insulin through pores in the skin. A similar device, but relying on skin-penetrating "microneedles", was in the animal testing stage in 2015. In the last couple of years, the use of chemical enhancers, electrical devices, and microneedle devices has shown tremendous promise for improving the penetration of insulin compared to passive transport via the skin. Transdermal insulin delivery shows a more patient-friendly and minimally invasive approach to daily diabetes care than the conventional hypodermic injection however, additional research is necessary to address issues such as long-term use, delivery efficiency, and reliability, as well as side effects involving inflammation and irritation.

=== Intranasal ===
Insulin can be delivered to the central nervous system via the intranasal (IN) route with little to no systemic uptake or associated peripheral side effects. It has been demonstrated that intranasally delivered insulin rapidly accumulates in CSF fluid, indicating effective transport to the brain. This accumulation is thought to occur along olfactory and nearby routes. Although numerous studies have published encouraging results, further study is still being conducted to comprehend its long-term impacts in order to begin the successful clinical application.

=== By mouth ===
The basic appeal of hypoglycemic agents by mouth is that most people would prefer a pill or an oral liquid to an injection. However, insulin is a peptide hormone, which is digested in the stomach and gut and in order to be effective at controlling blood sugar, cannot be taken orally in its current form.

The potential market for an oral form of insulin is assumed to be enormous, thus many laboratories have attempted to devise ways of moving enough intact insulin from the gut to the portal vein to have a measurable effect on blood sugar.

A number of derivatization and formulation strategies are currently being pursued to in an attempt to develop an orally available insulin. Many of these approaches employ nanoparticle delivery systems and several are being tested in clinical trials.

=== Pancreatic transplantation ===
Another improvement would be a transplantation of the pancreas or beta cell to avoid periodic insulin administration. This would result in a self-regulating insulin source. Transplantation of an entire pancreas (as an individual organ) is difficult and relatively uncommon. It is often performed in conjunction with liver or kidney transplant, although it can be done by itself. It is also possible to do a transplantation of only the pancreatic beta cells. However, islet transplants had been highly experimental for many years, but some researchers in Alberta, Canada, have developed techniques with a high initial success rate (about 90% in one group). Nearly half of those who got an islet cell transplant were insulin-free one year after the operation; by the end of the second year that number drops to about one in seven. However, researchers at the University of Illinois at Chicago (UIC) have slightly modified the Edmonton Protocol procedure for islet cell transplantation and achieved insulin independence in diabetic people, with fewer but better-functioning pancreatic islet cells.

Beta cell transplant may become practical. Additionally, some researchers have explored the possibility of transplanting genetically engineered non-beta cells to secrete insulin.

== See also ==
- International Unit (I) – Pharmacological measurement unit for the amount of a biologically active substance
- International System of Units (SI) – Modern form of the metric system
