= David E. Mitchell =

American executive and advocate (1950–2026)

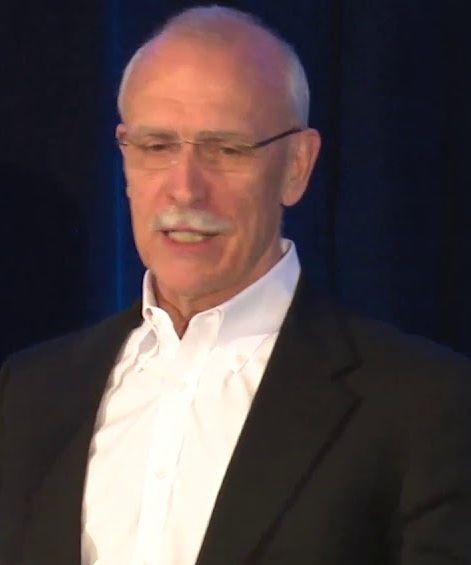
- Mitchell in 2018
- Born: David Emerson Mitchell; May 4, 1950; Detroit, Illinois, U.S.
- Died: January 2, 2026 (aged 75); Annapolis, Maryland, U.S.
- Education: Michigan State University (BJ, MILR)
- Occupations: Business executive; drug price advocate
- Years active: 1980s–2016 (As business executive); 2016–2025 (As drug price advocate)
- Board member of: Friends of Cancer Research
- Spouses: Rebecca Ford (divorced) Nicole Solomon (m. 1999)
- Children: 4

David Emerson Mitchell (May 4, 1950 – January 2, 2026) was an American business executive and drug price advocate. After a terminal cancer diagnosis, he founded Patients for Affordable Drugs Now.

== Early life and education ==
Mitchell was born on May 4, 1950, in Detroit. His mother was a substitute teacher and his father was a police officer. He was urged by his mother to become a lawyer. He was uncertain about going to college until a difficult and repetitive summer job working on a tractor-assembly line convinced him to go. He first attended Wayne State University and completed his undergraduate education at Michigan State University, graduating with a degree in journalism in 1977. He received a master's degree from Michigan State in 1978.

== Career ==
Mitchell worked for the United Auto Workers union for seven years, with three of those years as the head of the communications department. In 1986, he was a founding partner of GMMB, a Washington-based public relations firm in Washington, D.C. The firm worked in the fields of public health and safety. Mitchell worked with clients from government agencies, large nonprofits, and private businesses. He retired in 2016.

== Diagnosis and activism ==
Mitchell was diagnosed with multiple myeloma in 2010. Although the cancer was incurable, he could control it with treatment costing about US$440,000 annually, which was covered by his Medicare plan. In late 2016, he founded Patients for Affordable Drugs Now to advocate more affordable cancer treatment and affordable medications for a wide variety of illnesses. He said at the launch of the group that the message to drug companies was that it was "time for patients to say we’re not going to be frightened any longer by your threats not to give us drugs we need if we don’t pay prices you demand." He compared the healthcare system to an extortion racket similar to one commonly run by fictional mafioso Tony Soprano. It had early backing from the Laura and John Arnold Foundation and received a $75,000 donation each year from Mitchell himself. He had previously led campaigns on a number of issues related to public health including tobacco, drunk driving, and immunization. That same year, he brought a class action lawsuit against the pharmaceutical company Celgene, alleging they prevented the development of a generic version of the medication Revlimid. The group recorded tens of thousands of interviews with patients in every state and invited many to its hearings and rallies. It was responsible for a number of state laws passed to force price transparency. It is widely credited for having an annual cap on medication prices included in the Inflation Reduction Act of 2022.

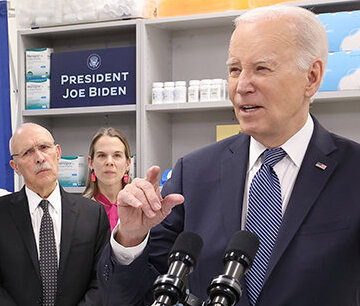
Mitchell (farther left) during a press conference held by President Joe Biden at the National Institutes of Health Clinical Center in 2023

Mitchell was a board member of Friends of Cancer Research.

== Personal life and death ==
Mitchell's grandparents immigrated to the United States. He and his wife had four children; in the last decade of his life, the couple lived in Bethesda, Maryland.

Mitchell died at home in Annapolis, Maryland, from multiple myeloma, on January 2, 2026, at the age of 75.
