= Patients for Affordable Drugs Now =

Patient advocacy and lobbying organization

Patients For Affordable Drugs Now is a patient advocacy and lobbying organization based in Washington, D.C., which focuses on policies to lower drug prices in the United States. It was founded by David Mitchell (who suffered from multiple myeloma), and has Merith Basey as its Executive Director since 2022.

It is financed by the Action Now Initiative (ANI) which is funded by the Laura and John Arnold Foundation. It is bipartisan and does not accept funding from any organizations that profit from development or distribution of prescription drugs.

Patients For Affordable Drugs Now has a separate political action arm called Patients for Affordable Drugs Action. It spent about $10 million to highlight drug prices as an issue in the 2018 United States elections.

In March 2019 Mitchell welcomed the suggestion that drug companies should be made to disclose the prices of their products in television commercials but said “We have not seen any evidence that it will lower drug prices."

When Eli Lilly and Company announced a halving of the price of insulin lispro, Ben Wakana, executive director of the advocacy group Patients for Affordable Drugs Now, denounced the move as a "token PR play".

It supports the proposal for a Prescription Drug Affordability Board as is being considered in Maryland and similar proposals made in Washington.

In 2022 it pointed out that the price of Humalog, Eli Lilly's insulin had increased from $20 in 1996 to $275.
