= Insulin glulisine =

Rapid-acting insulin analogue

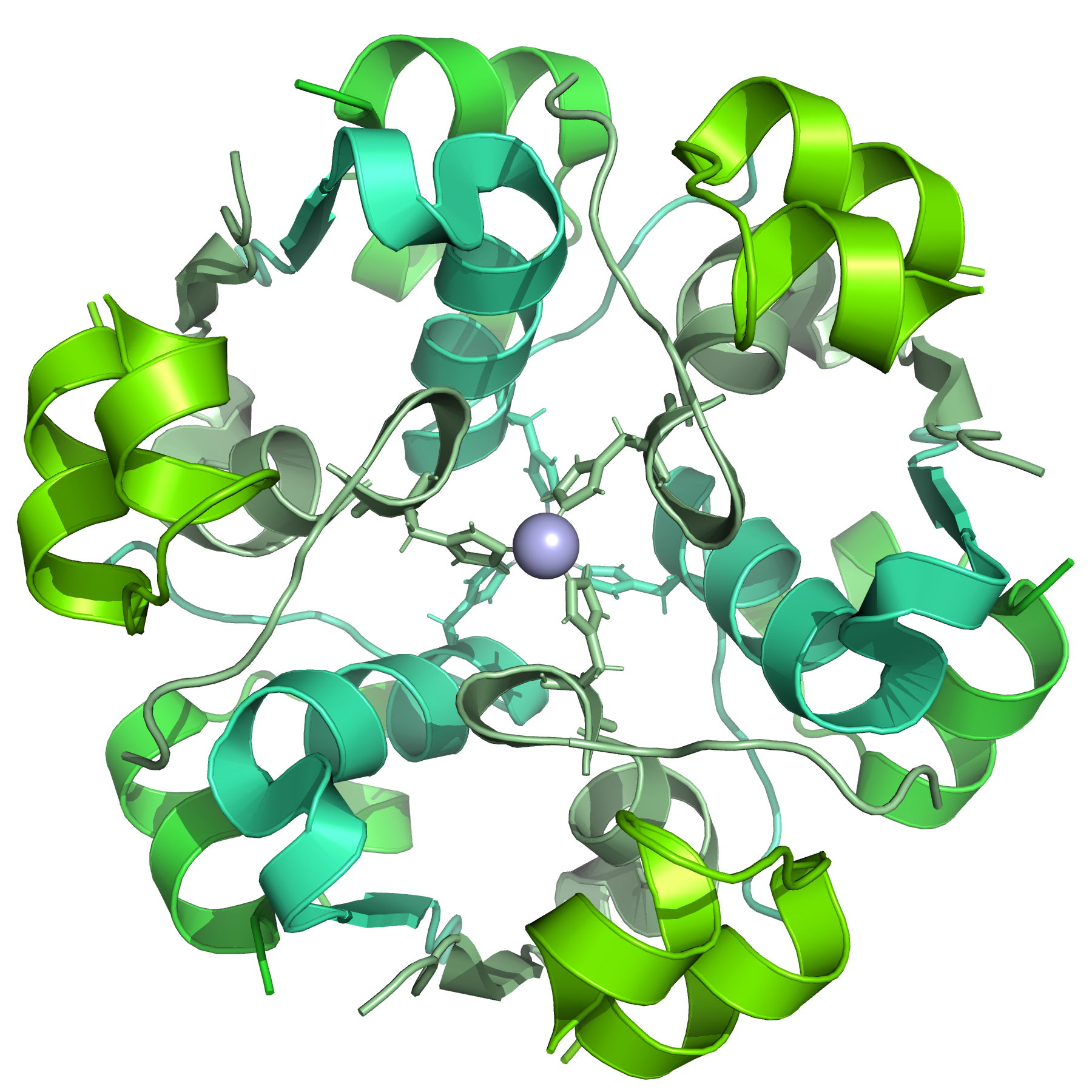
- PDB: 6gv0

Clinical data
- Pronunciation: /ˈɪnsəlɪn ˈɡluːlɪsiːn/ IN-sə-lin GLOO-lih-seen
- Trade names: Apidra, Apidra Solostar
- AHFS/Drugs.com: Monograph
- MedlinePlus: a607033
- License data: US DailyMed: Insulin glulisine
- Pregnancy category: AU: B3
- Routes of administration: Subcutaneous, intravenous
- ATC code: A10AB06 (WHO)

Legal status
- Legal status: AU: S4 (Prescription only); UK: POM (Prescription only); US: ℞-only; EU: Rx-only

Identifiers
- CAS Number: 207748-29-6
- DrugBank: DB01309
- ChemSpider: none
- UNII: 7XIY785AZD
- KEGG: D04540
- PDB ligand: 6gv0 (PDBe, RCSB PDB)

Chemical and physical data
- Formula: C_{258}H_{384}N_{64}O_{78}S_{6}
- Molar mass: 5822.64 g·mol^{−1}

Insulin glulisine, sold under the brand name Apidra among others, is a rapid-acting modified form of medical insulin used for the treatment of diabetes. It differs from human insulin in that the amino acid asparagine at position B3 is replaced by lysine and the lysine in position B29 is replaced by glutamic acid. When injected subcutaneously, it appears in the blood earlier than regular human insulin (RHI). Intravenous injections may be used for extreme hyperglycemia. It was developed by Sanofi-Aventis.

The most common side effects include hypoglycaemia (low blood glucose levels).

Insulin glulisine was approved for medical use in the United States and in the European Union in 2004.

== Medical uses ==
Insulin glulisine is indicated for the treatment of diabetes.

== Mechanism behind the rapid bioavailability ==
The monomer-monomer interactions are weaker in insulin glulisin compared to unmodified human insulin, and therefore, it does not as readily form dimers and hexamers, which are dominant in unmodified insulin. Due to their large size, insulin hexamers need to break up into dimers or monomers before they are able to enter the blood and become biologically active. Specifically, the B3 mutation causes electrostatic repulsion in the hexamer to arginine-22 in the B chain of other insulin molecules in the same hexamer, while the B29 mutation causes fewer hydrogen bonds to stabilize the dimer. Furthermore, the isoelectric point of insulin glulisine insulin, which is shifted from 5.5 (of unmodified human insulin) to 5.1, increases the solubility at physiological pH levels.
