= NPH insulin =

Intermediate acting insulin formulation

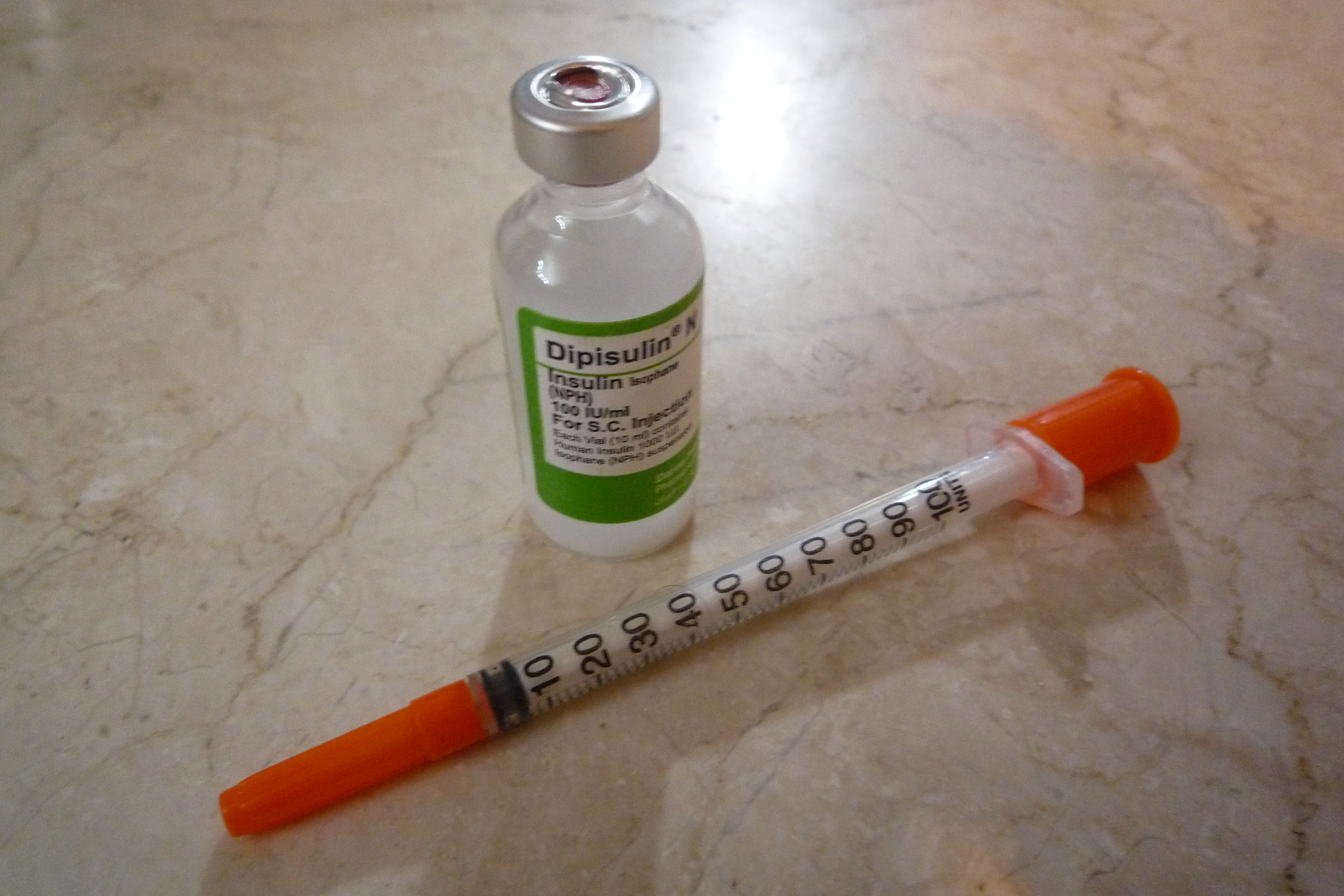
- A vial of NPH insulin with insulin syringe

Clinical data
- Trade names: Novolin N, Humulin N, Insulatard, others
- Other names: Neutral protamine Hagedorn insulin, protamine zinc insulin (slightly different), isophane insulin, compound insulin zinc suspension (slightly different), intermediate-acting insulin
- AHFS/Drugs.com: Monograph
- MedlinePlus: a682611
- Routes of administration: Subcutaneous
- ATC code: A10AC (WHO)

Legal status
- Legal status: US: ℞-only; EU: Rx-only

Pharmacokinetic data
- Onset of action: 90 minutes
- Duration of action: 24 hours

Identifiers
- CAS Number: 53027-39-7
- ChemSpider: none

Neutral Protamine Hagedorn (NPH) insulin, also known as isophane insulin, is an intermediate-acting insulin given to help control blood sugar levels in people with diabetes. The words refer to neutral pH (pH = 7), protamine a protein, and Hans Christian Hagedorn, the insulin researcher who invented this formulation. It is designed to improve the delivery of insulin, and is one of the earliest examples of engineered drug delivery.

It is used by injection under the skin once to twice a day. Onset of effects is typically in 90 minutes and they last for 24 hours. Versions are available that come premixed with a short-acting insulin, such as regular insulin.

The common side effect is low blood sugar. Other side effects may include pain or skin changes at the sites of injection, low blood potassium, and allergic reactions. Use during pregnancy is relatively safe for the fetus. NPH insulin is made by mixing regular insulin and protamine in exact proportions with zinc and phenol such that a neutral-pH is maintained and crystals form. There are human and pig insulin based versions.

Protamine insulin was first created in 1936 and NPH insulin in 1946. It is on the World Health Organization's List of Essential Medicines. NPH is an abbreviation for "neutral protamine Hagedorn". In 2020, insulin isophane was the 221st most commonly prescribed medication in the United States, with more than 2 million prescriptions. In 2020, the combination of human insulin with insulin isophane was the 246th most commonly prescribed medication in the United States, with more than 1 million prescriptions.

== Medical uses ==
NPH insulin is cloudy and has an onset of 1–3 hours. Its peak is 6–8 hours and its duration is up to 24 hours.

It has an intermediate duration of action, meaning longer than that of regular and rapid-acting insulin, and shorter than long acting insulins (ultralente, glargine or detemir). A recent Cochrane systematic review compared the effects of NPH insulin to other insulin analogues (insulin detemir, insulin glargine, insulin degludec) in both children and adults with Type 1 diabetes. Insulin detemir appeared provide a lower risk of severe hyperglycemia compared to NPH insulin, however this finding was inconsistent across included studies. In the same review no other clinically significant differences were found between different insulin analogues in either adults nor children.

== History ==
Hans Christian Hagedorn (1888–1971) and August Krogh (1874–1949) obtained the rights for insulin from Frederick Banting and Charles Best in Toronto, Canada. In 1923 they formed Nordisk Insulin laboratorium, and in 1926 with August Kongsted he obtained a Danish royal charter as a non-profit foundation.

In 1936, Hagedorn and B. Norman Jensen discovered that the effects of injected insulin could be prolonged by the addition of protamine obtained from the "milt" or semen of river trout. The insulin would be added to the protamine, but the solution would have to be brought to pH 7 for injection. University of Toronto, Canada later licensed protamine zinc insulin (PZI), to several manufacturers. This mixture only needs to be shaken before injection. The effects of PZI lasted for 24–36 h.

== Society and culture ==
=== Names ===
Brand names include Humulin N, Novolin N, Novolin NPH, Gensulin N, SciLin N, Insulatard, and NPH Iletin II.

== See also ==
- Insulin analogue
