= Insulin glargine =

Long-acting insulin

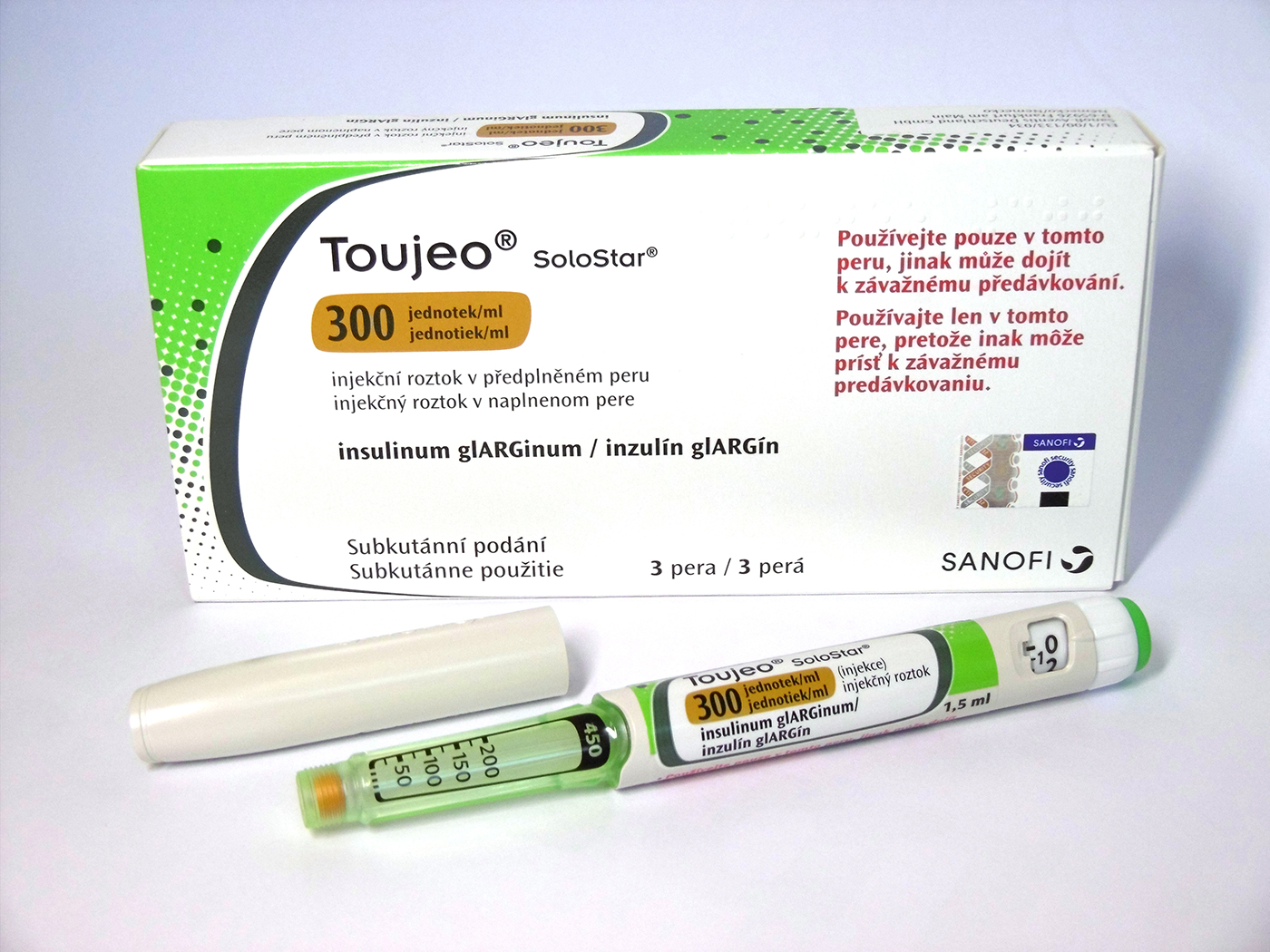
- Toujeo branded insulin glargine

Clinical data
- Pronunciation: /ˌɪnsəlɪn ˈɡlɑːrdʒiːn/ IN-sə-lin GLAR-jeen
- Trade names: Lantus, others
- Biosimilars: insulin glargine-aglr, insulin glargine-aldy, insulin glargine-yfgn, Abasaglar, Langlara, Ondibta, Rezvoglar, Semglee
- AHFS/Drugs.com: Monograph
- MedlinePlus: a600027
- License data: US DailyMed: Insulin glargine
- Pregnancy category: AU: B3
- Routes of administration: Subcutaneous
- ATC code: A10AE04 (WHO)

Legal status
- Legal status: AU: S4 (Prescription only); CA: ℞-only / Schedule D; UK: POM (Prescription only); US: ℞-only; EU: Rx-only; In general: ℞ (Prescription only)

Pharmacokinetic data
- Onset of action: ~1 hour
- Duration of action: 24–36 hours

Identifiers
- IUPAC name: Recombinant human insulin
- CAS Number: 160337-95-1
- IUPHAR/BPS: 7572
- DrugBank: DB00047
- ChemSpider: none
- UNII: 2ZM8CX04RZ
- KEGG: D03250
- CompTox Dashboard (EPA): DTXSID0043927
- ECHA InfoCard: 100.241.126

Chemical and physical data
- Formula: C_{267}H_{404}N_{72}O_{78}S_{6}
- Molar mass: 6062.96 g·mol^{−1}

Insulin glargine sold, among others, under the brand name Lantus (manufactured and marketed by Sanofi) is a long-acting modified form of medical insulin, used in the management of type 1 and type 2 diabetes. It is injected just under the skin. Effects generally begin an hour after use.

Common side effects include low blood sugar, problems at the site of injection, itchiness, and weight gain. Other serious side effects include low blood potassium. NPH insulin rather than insulin glargine is generally preferred in pregnancy. After injection, microcrystals slowly release insulin for about 24 hours. This insulin causes body tissues to absorb glucose from the blood and decreases glucose production by the liver.

Insulin glargine was patented, but the patent expired in most jurisdictions in 2014. It was approved for medical use in the United States in 2000. It is on the World Health Organization's List of Essential Medicines. In 2023, it was the 30th most commonly prescribed medication in the United States, with more than 18 million prescriptions. In July 2021, the US Food and Drug Administration (FDA) approved an interchangeable biosimilar insulin product called Semglee (insulin glargine-yfgn) for the treatment of diabetes.

== Medical uses ==
The long-acting insulin class, which includes insulin glargine, do not appear much better than neutral protamine Hagedorn (NPH) insulin, but do have a greater cost, making them, as of 2010, not cost effective for the treatment of type 2 diabetes. In a previous review it was unclear if there is a difference in hypoglycemia, as there was not enough data to determine any differences with respect to long term outcomes, however a more recent Cochrane systematic review did not find clinically significant difference when comparing insulin glargine to NPH insulin, insulin detemir or insulin degludec in the management of type 1 diabetes in either adults or children over periods of 6 months or longer. It is not typically the recommended long-acting insulin in the United Kingdom.

Semglee is indicated to improve glycemic control in adults and children with type 1 diabetes and in adults with type 2 diabetes. Semglee is both biosimilar to, and interchangeable with, its reference product Lantus (insulin glargine), a long-acting insulin analog.

=== Mixing with other insulins ===
The American Diabetes Association said in 2003 that, unlike some other longer-acting insulins, glargine should not be diluted or mixed with other insulin or solution in the same syringe, due to the low pH of its diluent. However, a 2004 study found that mixing glargine with other insulins did not affect short-term glycemic profile.

== Adverse effects ==
Common side effects include low blood sugar, problems at the site of injection, itchiness, and weight gain. Serious side effects include low blood potassium.

As of 2012, tentative evidence shows no association between insulin glargine and cancer. Previous studies had raised concerns.

When comparing insulin glargine to NPH insulin, insulin detemir or insulin degludec, no significant adverse effects were found in the management of type 1 diabetes in either adults or children in periods of six months or longer.

== Pharmacology ==
=== Mechanism of action ===
Insulin glargine differs from human insulin by replacing asparagine with glycine in position 21 of the A-chain and by carboxy-terminal extension of B-chain by 2 arginine residues. The arginine amino acids shift the isoelectric point from a pH of 5.4 to 6.7, making the molecule more soluble at an acidic pH and less soluble at physiological pH. The isoelectric shift also allows for the subcutaneous injection of a clear solution. The glycine substitution prevents deamidation of the acid-sensitive asparagine at acidic pH. In the neutral subcutaneous space, higher-order aggregates form, resulting in a slow, peakless dissolution and absorption of insulin from the site of injection.

== History ==
In June 2000, the European Commission formally approved the launching of Lantus by Sanofi-Aventis Germany in the European Union. The admission was prolonged on 9 June 2005.

A three-fold more concentrated formulation, brand name Toujeo, was introduced after FDA approval in 2015.

== Legal status ==
=== Biosimilars ===
Abasaglar was authorized for medical use in the European Union in September 2014.

Lusduna was authorized for medical use in the European Union in January 2017.

Semglee was authorized for medical use in the European Union in March 2018.

Semglee (glargine-yfgn) was approved for medical use in the United States in July 2021.

Rezvoglar (glargine-aglr) was approved for medical use in the United States in December 2021.

In November 2025, the Committee for Medicinal Products for Human Use of the European Medicines Agency adopted a positive opinion, recommending the granting of a marketing authorization for the medicinal product Ondibta, intended for the treatment of diabetes. The applicant for this medicinal product is Gan & Lee Pharmaceuticals Europe GmbH. Ondibta is a biosimilar medicinal product that is highly similar to the reference product Lantus, which was authorized in the EU in June 2000. Ondibta was authorized for medical use in the European Union in January 2026.

=== Patent expiry ===
Patent protection for insulin glargine expired in the European Union and the United States in 2014. Insulin glargine from competitor Eli Lilly became available in most countries during 2015, under the brand names Basaglar (as a follow-on in the US) and Abasaglar (as a biosimilar in the EU).

=== Brand names ===
Insulin glargine is sold under various brand names including Basaglar, Lantus, and Toujeo.
