= Regular insulin =

Short-acting insulin formulation

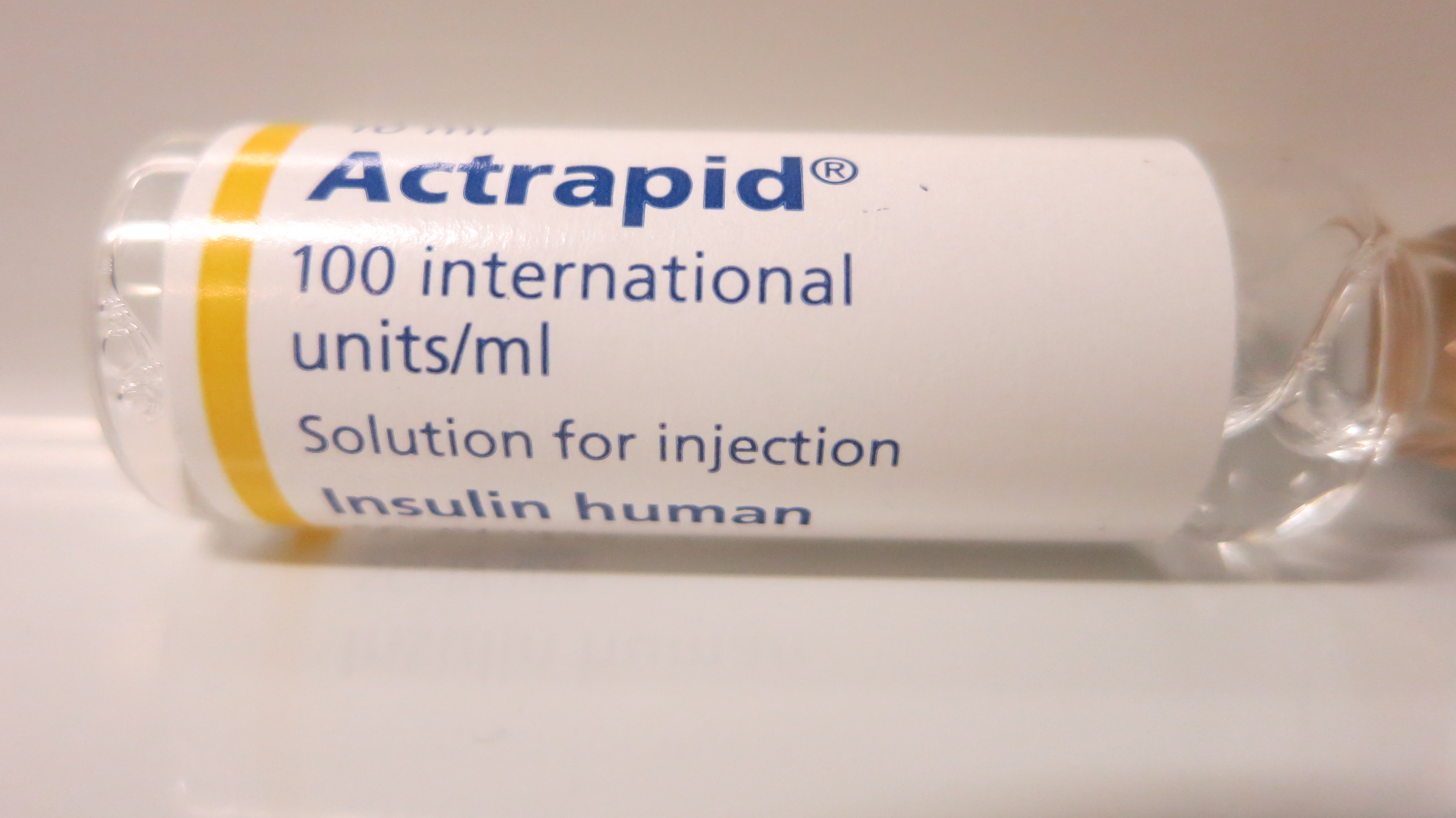
- A vial of regular human insulin

Clinical data
- Trade names: Humulin R, Novolin R, Actrapid, others
- Other names: insulin injection (soluble), neutral insulin, regular human insulin, human insulin (regular), Toronto insulin
- Biosimilars: Myxredlin
- AHFS/Drugs.com: Monograph
- MedlinePlus: a682611
- License data: US DailyMed: Humulin
- Routes of administration: Subcutaneous, intramuscular, intravenous
- ATC code: A10AB (WHO)

Legal status
- Legal status: CA: ℞-only / Schedule D; US: OTC / Rx-only

Pharmacokinetic data
- Onset of action: 30 minutes
- Duration of action: 8 hours

Identifiers
- CAS Number: 9004-10-8 11061-68-0 (insulin human)
- ChemSpider: none
- UNII: 1Y17CTI5SR

Regular insulin, also known as neutral insulin and soluble insulin, is a type of short-acting medical insulin. It is used to treat type 1 diabetes, type 2 diabetes, gestational diabetes, and complications of diabetes such as diabetic ketoacidosis and hyperosmolar hyperglycemic states. It is also used along with glucose to treat high blood potassium levels. Typically it is given by injection under the skin, but may also be used by injection into a vein or muscle. Onset of effect is typically in 30 minutes and it typically lasts for 8 hours.

The common side effect is low blood sugar. Other side effects may include pain or skin changes at the sites of injection, low blood potassium, and allergic reactions. Use during pregnancy is relatively safe for the baby. Regular insulin can be made from the pancreas of pigs or cows. Human versions can be made either by modifying pig versions or recombinant technology.

Insulin was first used as a medication in Canada by Charles Best and Frederick Banting in 1922. It is on the World Health Organization's List of Essential Medicines. In 2017, it was the 209th most commonly prescribed medication in the United States, with more than 2 million prescriptions. Versions are also available mixed with longer-acting versions of insulin, such as NPH insulin. In 2020, the combination of human insulin with insulin isophane was the 246th most commonly prescribed medication in the United States, with more than 2 million prescriptions.

== Medical uses ==
Regular insulin is used for the long-term management of diabetes. It is the treatment of choice for the two diabetic emergencies diabetic ketoacidosis and hyperosmolar hyperglycemic states. It may also be used in combination with glucose to lower potassium levels in those with hyperkalemia.

== Side effects ==
Side effects may include: low blood sugar levels, skin reactions at the site of injection and low potassium levels among others.

== Manufacture ==
Humulin, one brand name for a group of biosynthetic human insulin products, is synthesized in a laboratory strain of Escherichia coli bacteria which has been genetically altered with recombinant DNA to produce biosynthetic human insulin. Humulin R consists of zinc-insulin crystals dissolved in a clear fluid.

== Formulations ==
It is sold by many manufacturers in a number of different forms.

By Eli Lilly these include:

- Humulin R (REGULAR human insulin injection [rDNA origin]) is a short-acting insulin that has a relatively short duration of activity as compared with other insulins.
- Humulin R Regular U-500 (Concentrated) insulin human injection, USP (rDNA Origin) is a stronger concentration (500 units/mL) of Humulin R.
- Humulin 70/30 (70% human insulin isophane suspension, 30% human insulin injection [rDNA origin]) is a mixture insulin. It is an intermediate-acting insulin combined with the onset of action of Humulin
- Humulin 50/50 (50% human insulin isophane suspension, 50% human insulin injection [rDNA origin]) is a mixture insulin. It is an intermediate-acting insulin combined with the onset of action of Humulin R.

In UK these include:

- Actrapid
- Humulin S
- Insuman Rapid
