= Insulin aspart =

Rapid-acting man-made insulin

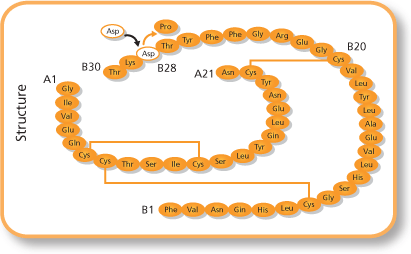

Clinical data
- Pronunciation: /ˈɪnsəlɪn ˈæspɑːrt/ IN-sə-lin AS-part
- Trade names: Novolog, others
- Biosimilars: insulin aspart-fsan, insulin aspart-szjj, insulin aspart-xjhz, Dazparda, Garzulys, Kirsty, Merilog, Merilog Solostar, Trurapi, Truvelog, Truvelog Mix 30
- AHFS/Drugs.com: Monograph
- MedlinePlus: a605013
- License data: US DailyMed: Insulin aspart
- Pregnancy category: AU: A
- Routes of administration: Subcutaneous, intravenous
- Drug class: Antidiabetic agent
- ATC code: A10AB05 (WHO)

Legal status
- Legal status: AU: S4 (Prescription only); CA: OTC / Schedule D; UK: POM (Prescription only); US: ℞-only; EU: Rx-only; In general: ℞ (Prescription only)

Pharmacokinetic data
- Onset of action: 15 minutes
- Duration of action: 3–5 hours

Identifiers
- CAS Number: 116094-23-6
- PubChem CID: 16132418
- DrugBank: DB01306
- ChemSpider: none
- UNII: D933668QVX
- KEGG: D04475
- ChEMBL: ChEMBL1201496
- CompTox Dashboard (EPA): DTXSID10151274

Chemical and physical data
- Formula: C_{256}H_{381}N_{65}O_{79}S_{6}
- Molar mass: 5825.60 g·mol^{−1}

Insulin aspart, sold under the brand name Novolog, among others, is a modified type of medical insulin used to treat type 1 and type 2 diabetes. It is generally used by injection under the skin (into the abdomen, buttocks, thighs, or upper arms) but may also be used by injection into a vein.

Common side effects include low blood sugar, allergic reactions, itchiness, and pain at the site of injection. Other common side effects may include injection site reactions, itching, rash, lipodystrophy (skin thickening or pitting at the injection site), weight gain and swelling of hands and feet. Other serious side effects may include low blood potassium (hypokalemia), low blood sugar (hypoglycemia), and severe allergic reactions. Use in pregnancy and breastfeeding is generally safe. It works the same as human insulin by increasing the amount of glucose that tissues take in and decreasing the amount of glucose made by the liver. It is a manufactured form of human insulin; where a single amino acid has been changed, specifically a proline with an aspartic acid at the B28 position.

Insulin aspart was approved for medical use in the United States in 2000. In 2023, it was the 102nd most commonly prescribed medication in the United States, with more than 6 million prescriptions. Manufacturing involves yeast, which have had the gene for insulin aspart put into their genome. This yeast then makes the insulin, which is harvested from the bioreactor. It is on the World Health Organization's List of Essential Medicines.

== Medical uses ==
Insulin aspart is indicated to improve glycemic control in people with diabetes.

=== Onset of action ===
The onset of action is approximately fifteen minutes, the peak action is reached in 45–90 minutes, and the duration is 3–5 hours.

== Side effects ==
The safety of insulin aspart in people with diabetes is no different from that of regular insulin. The side effects that are commonly associated with insulin therapy include: allergic reactions, injection site irritation, rashes, and hypoglycemia. The most common side effect is hypoglycemia. Long-term use of insulin, including insulin aspart, can cause lipodystrophy at the site of repeated injections or infusion. To reduce the risk of lipodystrophy, rotate the injection sites within the same region. Weight gain can also occur with the use of insulin aspart and it has been attributed to anabolic effects of insulin and a decrease in glucosuria. Use of insulin aspart has also been associated with sodium retention and edema.

== Formulations ==
Insulin aspart can be used in an insulin pump and insulin pen for subcutaneous injection. Additionally, it can be used with an injection port such as the I-port.

Insulin aspart has a more rapid onset, and a shorter duration of activity than normal human insulin. Insulin aspart can also be used with external insulin pumps.

An insulin aspart injection (NovoLog brand) along with its packaging.

=== Variations ===
Novolog Mix 70/30 is a product which contains 30% insulin aspart and 70% insulin aspart protamine. The insulin aspart protamine portion is a crystalline form of insulin aspart, which delays the action of the insulin, giving it a prolonged absorption profile after injection. The combination of the fast-acting form and the long-acting form allows the patient to receive fewer injections over the course of the day.

Novolog Mix is marketed to be used with the Novo Flexpen. The onset of action is less than 30 minutes, the peak action is reached in 1–4 hours, and the duration is less than 24 hours. NovoLog Mix is marketed in some countries as NovoMix 30.

NovoRapid is produced in Saccharomyces cerevisiae by recombinant DNA technology.

A faster acting version of aspart insulin, known as fast-aspart (Fiasp) insulin, is associated with more efficient control of post-prandial rise in blood glucose, without increasing the risks of hypoglycemia and glycemic variability.

== Biosimilars ==
In December 2020, the Committee for Medicinal Products for Human Use (CHMP) of the European Medicines Agency adopted a positive opinion, recommending the granting of a marketing authorization for the medicinal product Kixelle, intended for the treatment of diabetes. The applicant for this medicinal product is Mylan IRE Healthcare Limited. Kixelle was approved for medical use in the European Union in February 2021. Kixelle was renamed to Kirsty.

Trurapi was approved for medical use in Canada in October 2020.

Truvelog and Truvelog Solostar were approved for medical use in Australia in October 2020.

In October 2021, Kirsty was approved for medical use in Canada.

In February 2022, the CHMP adopted a positive opinion, recommending the granting of a marketing authorization for the medicinal product Truvelog Mix 30, intended for the treatment of diabetes. The applicant for this medicinal product is sanofi-aventis groupe. It was approved for medical use in the European Union in April 2022. In January 2024, the European Commission withdrew the marketing authorization for Truvelog Mix 30 (insulin aspart) in the European Union. The withdrawal was at the request of the marketing authorization holder, Sanofi Winthrop Industrie, which notified the European Commission of its decision to permanently discontinue the marketing of the product for commercial reasons.

In February 2025, insulin aspart-szjj, sold under the brand names Merilog and Merilog Solostar, is a biosimilar to Novolog that was approved for medical use in the United States in February 2025. It is the first biosimilar to Novolog approved by the US Food and Drug Administration (FDA). The FDA granted approval of Merilog to Sanofi-Aventis. Merilog is the third insulin biosimilar product approved by the FDA and it joins the two long-acting insulin biosimilar products approved by the FDA in 2021.

== Society and culture ==
As of 2018, there is a lack of compelling evidence to conclude superiority of insulin aspart over human insulin in type 2 diabetes. It is thus unclear why the shifting of people from human insulin to insulin aspart has occurred. In type 1 diabetes it appears to result in slightly better blood sugar control.

=== Legal status ===
Insulin aspart was approved for medical use in the United States in 2000.
