= Thapsic acid =

Names
- Preferred IUPAC name Hexadecanedioic acid
- Other names 1,14-Tetradecanedicarboxylic acid

Identifiers
CAS Number	505-54-4
3D model (JSmol)	Interactive image
ChEBI	CHEBI:73722
ChemSpider	10027
ECHA InfoCard	100.007.285
EC Number	208-013-5
KEGG	C19615
MeSH	C012346
PubChem CID	10459
UNII	SVZ90045Y2
CompTox Dashboard (EPA)	DTXSID2060129
- InChI: InChI=1S/C16H30O4/c17-15(18)13-11-9-7-5-3-1-2-4-6-8-10-12-14-16(19)20/h1-14H2,(H,17,18)(H,19,20) Key: QQHJDPROMQRDLA-UHFFFAOYSA-N; InChI=1S/C16H30O4/c17-15(18)13-11-9-7-5-3-1-2-4-6-8-10-12-14-16(19)20/h1-14H2,(H,17,18)(H,19,20) Key: QQHJDPROMQRDLA-UHFFFAOYSA-N
- SMILES: C(CCCCCCCC(=O)O)CCCCCCC(=O)O

Properties
Chemical formula	C_{16}H_{30}O_{4}
Molar mass	286.412 g·mol^{−1}
Density	1.209 g/cm^{3}
Melting point	120 to 126 °C (248 to 259 °F; 393 to 399 K)
Boiling point	457.5 °C (855.5 °F; 730.6 K) at 760 mmHg
Solubility in water	0.0057 g/L

Hazards
- GHS labelling
Pictograms	(GHS07: Exclamation mark)
Signal word	Warning
Hazard statements	H315, H319, H335
Precautionary statements	P261, P264, P271, P280, P302+P352, P304+P340, P305+P351+P338, P312, P321, P332+P313, P337+P313, P362, P403+P233, P405, P501
- Except where otherwise noted, data are given for materials in their standard state (at 25 °C [77 °F], 100 kPa). verify (what is ?) Infobox references

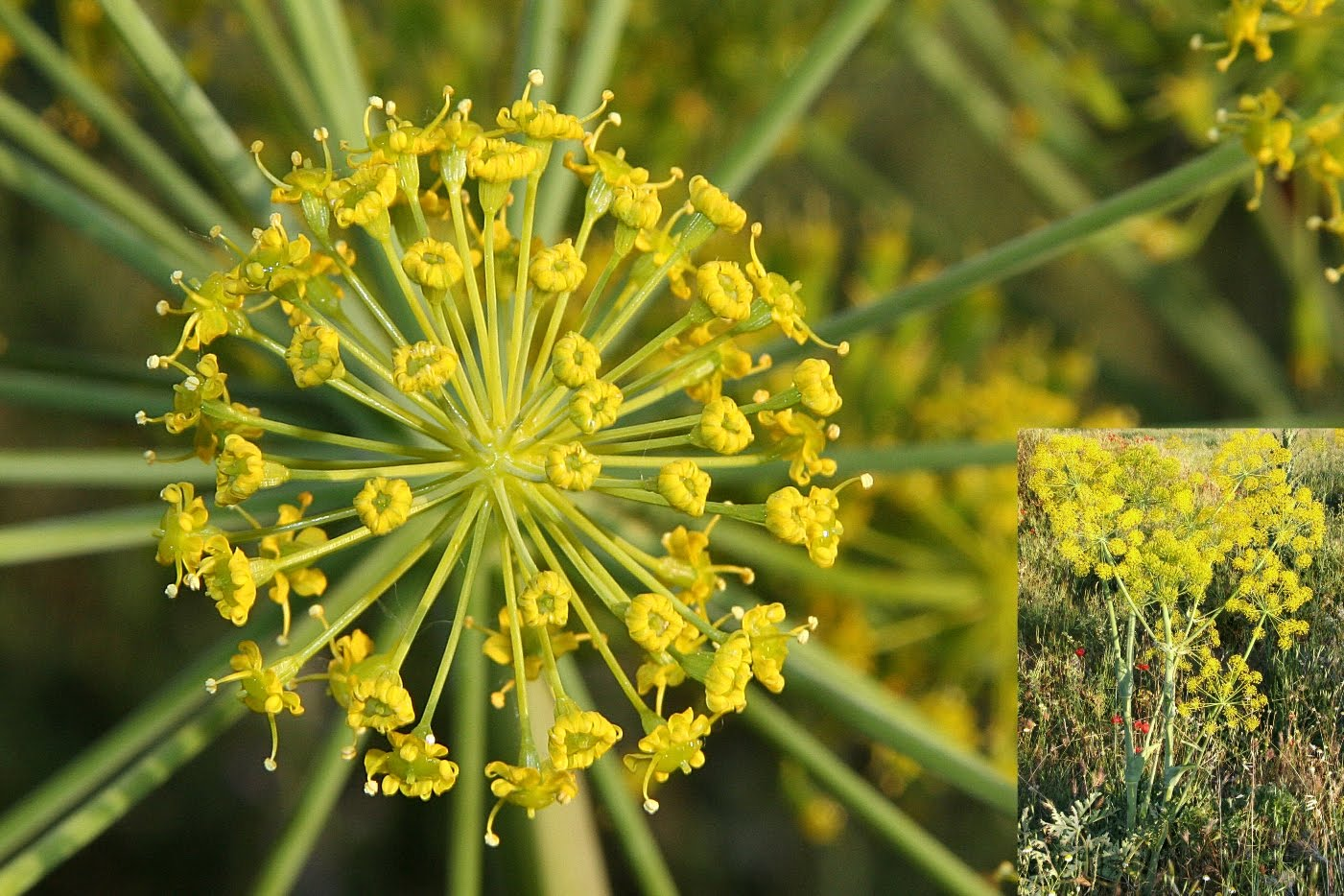
Thapsia, the plant from which the name thapsic acid is derived

Thapsic acid (hexadecanedioic acid) is a naturally occurring dicarboxylic acid with the formula HO_{2}C(CH_{2})_{14}CO_{2}H. The name is derived from Thapsia, the Latin name for a Mediterranean perennial whose roots contain thapsic acid.

It has a role as a human metabolite. It is the conjugate acid of hexadecanedioate.
