= Glossary of diabetes =

The following is a glossary of diabetes which explains terms connected with diabetes.

== A ==
Acanthosis nigricans
A brown to black, poorly defined, velvety hyperpigmentation of the skin, usually present in the posterior and lateral folds of the neck, the axilla, groin, umbilicus, and other areas. This occurs due to insulin spillover (from excessive production due to obesity or insulin resistance) into the skin which results in abnormal growth being observed. The most common cause would be insulin resistance, usually from type 2 diabetes mellitus.
ACE inhibitor
Angiotensin conversion enzyme. A class of drugs used to decrease hypertension, mainly by interfering with the renin kidney—blood pressure control cycle. An example is Ramparil. (See ARB).
Adult-onset diabetes
One of the former terms for Type 2 diabetes. See: Type 2 diabetes mellitus.
Acetohexamide
A pill taken to lower the level of glucose (sugar) in the blood. People with Type 2 diabetes may take these pills. See also: Oral hypoglycemic agents. One of the sulfonylurea drugs. (Dymelor Dimelor)
Acetone
A byproduct of fat metabolism. One of three ketone body substances. Produced in high levels during periods of stress, infection, etc possibly leading to diabetic ketoacidosis, a very serious condition. It can sometimes be smelled on the breath of those in, or about to enter diabetic ketoacidosis as a fruity (nail polish remover, or lacquer thinner) sort of smell. It is very rapidly released into via the lungs into the breath, unlike the other ketone bodies. It is chemically a ketone.
Acidosis
An acidic condition in body fluids, chiefly blood. If prolonged, or severe, it can cause coma and death regardless of cause. For a person with diabetes, this can be caused by insufficient glucose absorption (e.g. from inadequate insulin) combined with metabolic ketosis. It can lead to diabetic ketoacidosis, a medical emergency.
Acute
Happens for a limited period of time; abrupt onset; sharp, severe.
Adrenal gland
An endocrine gland located on top of the human kidney. Secretes adrenaline, one of the primary 'fight or flight' stress hormones, which have substantial counterregulatory effects.
Adverse effect
A harmful result.
Albuminuria
release of the protein albumin in urine. As this protein is strongly conserved, this is evidence of abnormal kidney function.
Aldose reductase inhibitor
Alpha cell
one of the types of cell in the pancreas (in areas called the Islets of Langerhans). Alpha cells make and release a hormone called glucagon, which raises the level of glucose (sugar) in the blood.
Amino acid
a weak acid carbon compound containing carbon, hydrogen, oxygen, and nitrogen. The nitrogenous amine group is characteristic of each. Amino acids are the building blocks of protein and there are about 20 used in the human body, of which about half can be constructed internally. The rest must come in the diet—they are the essential amino acids.
Amyotrophy
A type of diabetic neuropathy that causes muscle weakness and wasting.
Amylin
A peptide thought to be involved in beta cell loss in type 2 diabetes.
Angiopathy
A process that damages the blood vessels.
Anomalies
Abnormalities, as in birth defects, or in peculiar results or developments. For instance, diabetes can develop in an anomalous, unusual, way.
Antibodies
Chemicals produced by the immune system which are very carefully tuned to attach only to particular substances in foreign bodies (e.g., viruses, bacteria, foreign tissue, ...) When they attach to their target substances, other parts of the immune system attack and destroy the tagged protein or cell. It is an inappropriate antibody reaction to normal proteins found on beta cells that are thought to be the main mechanism of beta cell destruction in Type 1 diabetes.
Anti-diabetic drug
A kind of medication that helps a person with diabetes control the level of glucose (sugar) in the blood so that the body works as it should. See also: Insulin; oral hypoglycemic agents.
Antigen
The substance in a foreign body which evokes production of antibodies specific to it.
Antiseptic
A product that reduces the presence of infective agents.
ARB
Angiotensisn Receptor Blocker. An agent which interferes with the renin (kidney-lung-heart blood pressure control) cycle. An example is Atacand. (See ACE inhibitor).
Arteriosclerosis
Hardening of the blood vessels. It causes inflexibility of the arterial walls, so they are not flexible as in a healthy condition. It also usually involves atherosclerosis, i.e. deposits (called plaques) on the interior surface of many arteries, which are composed of LDL and assorted other debris (including platelets). Broken pieces of those deposits or closure of the arterial opening can cause myocardial infarction or stroke. Precisely what causes it is not fully known, but diabetics have increased risk of both heart attack and stroke, so some of the tissue damage diabetes produces may be involved. Equivalent to atherosclerosis.
Artery
Blood vessel with muscular walls on the 'supply side' of the blood circulation, in the network of vessels between the left ventricle output and capillary beds throughout the body.
Artificial pancreas
A large machine used in hospitals that constantly measures glucose (sugar) in the blood and, in response, releases the right amount of insulin. Scientists are also working to develop a small unit that could be implanted in the body, functioning like a real pancreas. Note that the pancreas is a complex multi-functional organ, and replacement of properly regulated insulin production would be only partial functional duplication; it is likely that an artificial pancreas in a diabetic context would not replace an entire existing organ.
Aspartame
An artificial sweetener that can replace sugar in many uses. Chemically it is two amino acids and is therefore a kind of miniature protein, a very small peptide. It is sweet because, in a way not entirely clear even now, it interacts with the taste buds to cause a sweet taste.
Asymptomatic
No symptoms; no clear sign of disease present. Most Type II diabetics are without clinically obvious symptoms for some time (often years) before they are diagnosed as diabetic.
Atherosclerosis
See: Arteriosclerosis.
Autoimmune disease
A condition in which the immune system inappropriately attacks a body tissue. Multiple sclerosis, some kinds of rheumatism, lupus, and Type 1 diabetes are examples. The reasons for the immune system misbehavior are not, in general, understood.
Autonomic neuropathy
Damage to nerves that do not control senses or muscles. These nerves control 'automatic' processes, like heart rate and body temperature. They can be damaged by diabetes, just like 'regular' somatic nerves, but the results are 'system-wide', not just pain or muscle weakness. Balance, intestinal control, blood pressure regulation, sweating, breathing rate, ... are all controlled or influenced by the autonomic nervous system.

== B ==
Background retinopathy
Also known as non-proliferative retinopathy
Basal rate
A continuous supply of something. In the case of diabetes, the low levels of insulin usually maintained in the absence of perturbing events (e.g., food, infection, stress, ...).
Beta cell
One of the cell types found in the Islets of Langerhans in the pancreas. They are the source of insulin, and contain mechanisms which watch blood glucose levels and which secrete (or not) insulin in response.
Beta cell transplantation
See: Islet cell transplantation.
Biosynthetic human insulin
A man-made insulin that is chemically identical to like human insulin. See also: Human insulin.
Biphasic insulin
A type of pharmaceutical insulin that is a mixture of intermediate- and fast-acting insulin.
Blood glucose
Glucose is a simple sugar and the primary fuel for body cells. It is absorbed from some foods (or produced from starchy ones), absorbed into the cells (for about 2/3 of cells, this is under control of insulin), stored temporarily in the liver as glycogen, made in starvation from the glycerin backbone of triglycerides, and from a few amino acids. Glucose metabolism anomalies are the cause of diabetes mellitus.
Blood glucose meter
A machine which electrochemically or coloristically, determines the current level of glucose in a blood sample. They have been getting progressively smaller and less expensive since they were first introduced. The expense of testing is primarily in the one time use strips used which are unique to each testing machine. Some machines can also measure the amount of ketones in the blood, using different testing strips, or glycosylated hemoglobin (i.e., Hb1c).
Blood glucose monitoring
Tracking one's blood glucose level, usually by using a blood glucose meter. This was formerly characterized by periodic testing in a clinic or hospital. If done properly, the modern monitoring is far more useful, given the rapid changes of glucose levels as a result of meals, exercise, medication, etc.
Blood pressure
The hydraulic pressure in arteries caused heart contractions (i.e., of the left ventricle). It has two values. The higher is taken immediately at the end of the left ventricle's contraction. The lower is the 'background pressure' in the arteries when the left ventricle is not contracting. .
Blood-sampling device
Blood sugar
A (misnomer) name for blood glucose.
Blood urea nitrogen (BUN)
A measurement of a metabolic waste product in the blood. Urea is a characteristic end product of protein disassembly and processing; this continues normally as a function of tissue repair and replacement. Increased levels of BUN in the blood may indicate early kidney damage as the kidney fails to excrete it in the urine.
Blood vessels
Tubes which carry blood around the body. They come in three types, arteries, veins, and capillaries. Capillaries are always tiny, the others vary from large (centimeters in diameter) to quite small (slightly smaller than the diameter of a red blood cell).
Bolus
An amount of something given in one 'lump.' A meal is a food bolus, continuous snacking for an afternoon is not. In diabetes, bolus is an extra amount of insulin given in a single dose to cover an expected rise in blood glucose (sugar), such as the rise that occurs after eating.
Borderline Diabetes
A term no longer used. See: Impaired glucose tolerance.
Brittle diabetes
A person with a blood glucose (sugar) level often swings quickly from high to low and from low to high. Also called labile and unstable diabetes.
Bronze diabetes
See: Hemochromatosis.
Bunion
A bump or bulge on the first joint of the big toe caused by the swelling of a sac of fluid under the skin.

== C ==
C.D.E.
See: #Certified diabetes educator.
C-peptide
A substance the pancreas releases into the bloodstream in equal amounts to insulin. While being stored in pancreatic beta cells, proinsulin includes both insulin and C-peptide, which is freed before insulin secretion into the blood. Currently, since pharmaceutical insulin does not contain C-peptide, a C-peptide level test will show how much insulin the body is making. Insulin is prepared as two insulin molecules linked by a c-peptide. When insulin is secreted, C-peptide is released as well. It has in recent years been shown to have hormone properties, so far chiefly in connection with arterial vessel muscle tone. It has been shown to ameliorate some diabetic complications, such as neuropathy and microvascular damage. C-peptide varies much more between animal species than does insulin itself.
Calcium channel blocker
Calcium ions are used in many cells, including beta cells, as a signaling mechanism. Since it does not ordinarily pass through cell membranes, protein pores in cell membranes are used to provide a channel through which it can be 'pumped' – an activity which requires energy if done against a concentration gradient. A Ca+ channel blocker is a drug which interferes with the operation of (some?) such channels. They have widespread effects, since Ca+ is used for many purposes in assorted tissues.
Callus
A small area of skin, usually on the foot, that has become thick and hard from rubbing or pressure as a result of increased production of surface skin (i.e., the topmost living cell layer); the callus itself is the result of this overgrowth and is itself a thickened 'dead cell surface layer'. Podiatry defines a callus as a skin lesion, and if it becomes cracked or internally separates, infection can follow, often with no warning signs. Calluses may lead to other problems such as serious infection. Shoes that fit well aid in reducing callus formation as they reduce localized rubbing and friction. Calluses are important risk factors for diabetics, in part because of changes in skin or vasculature characteristic of feet and lower legs in diabetics. See also: Foot care.
Calorie
a measure of the chemical energy in a specific amount of material. The food Calorie (resulting from combustion with oxygen from the atmosphere) is 1000x the calorie used in heat studies (i.e., in physics). Not all calories in food are actually usable. For instance, sawdust is largely cellulose (i.e., glucoses stuck together in long chains), and can be burned in a calorimeter (a common method of determining calorie content), but the human body contains no mechanism to convert it to its component glucoses for use as fuel. Calories relevant to diet (and so to diabetics) come only from those substances in food which can actually be used by the body. Thus, protein is not normally used for fuel, and so should not be counted as a food calorie in normal situations; nevertheless, it is usually taken into account. In a calorimeter (and in most diet references) all protein and carbohydrate is worth 4 calories/gram, while fat/oils are worth 9 calories/gram, and various alcohols and other (largely artificial) chemicals are worth fewer. A gram is about 1/25 of an ounce for those more familiar with English measures. The amount of usable calories in food is less than the amount measured in a calorimeter, and requires more care to determine. For instance, starch in plant foods is not readily available to be processed in digestion. Cooked starch (especially when cooked in the presence of moisture) is far more available digestively than raw starch (perhaps 60% vs nearly 100%).
Capillary
a very small blood vessel. At one end of a capillary is a connection to the body's arteries and at the other end of a capillary is a connection to the body's veins. It is in the capillaries that most gas exchange takes place (oxygen out of the blood into the tissues, and carbon dioxide into the blood). The reverse exchange happens in the capillaries of the lungs. Capillaries are controlled by very small muscles which, together, affect blood pressure very substantially. Those muscles are in turn controlled by, among other things, the presence or absence of insulin (and probably C-peptide) in the blood.
Capsaicin
a substance found in some plant products, especially hot peppers, which causes human nerves to report a hot sensation.
Carbohydrate
Any compound containing carbon, hydrogen, sometimes oxygen. There is considerable variety in these compounds and only some of them are available to humans as a fuel source. Cellulose, for instance, is a carbohydrate, but humans and all non-cud chewing animals (except termites and some microorganisms) can make no use of it. Only a few of the simple sugars (mono-saccharides) and even fewer of the di-saccharides (e.g., lactose) in food are available to humans. Others, if they contribute to human nutrition, do so after processing by intestinal bacteria (some estimates are that, in humans, less than 10% of caloric benefit comes from fermentation in the large intestine, as contrasted to other primates in which the proportion is rather larger). Most carbohydrates that can be absorbed and used for fuel by humans (e.g., starch and glycogen—both chains of glucose molecules).are eventually broken down to glucose during digestion. They eventually are part of the primary metabolic control mechanism. Fructose, on the other hand, is a carbohydrate which is neither; it is absorbed, but in humans processed only in the liver and in sperm, the only tissues which have the required enzymes. Ingested carbohydrate calories in non glucose forms are, in a special sense, invisible to the body. There has been recent speculation that the increase in such carbohydrates since sucrose (table sugar—half glucose and half fructose) became available in quantity after about 1700 with the discovery of a practical source (sugar cane), accounts for some of the diseases of civilization, including diabetes. Fructose had been quite rare in human diet until that time. Dietary fructose also characteristically causes alterations in blood lipid profiles, probably by changing liver operations.
Cardiologist
a physician with special training for treating heart and circulatory problems.
Cardiovascular
pertaining to the heart and vascular system (blood vessels).
Carpal tunnel syndrome
irritation and swelling of one or more of the nerves in the carpal tunnel in the wrist. Effects range from considerable pain to loss of strength or muscle control. The cause is thought to be mechanical, as in repetitive motion of the wrist joint as in typing while in inappropriate wrist positions.
Cataract
clouding of the transparent protein in the lens of the eye. A certain amount of this clouding occurs naturally during life. The elderly do not, therefore see quite the same way as they used to since there is a slight yellowish cast in the clouded lens. Diabetics have an increased risk for cataract since high levels of glucose cause reactions with assorted proteins, including those in the lens; many of the reaction products are not optically clear, nor pack in the same way, thus altering the shape of the lens. There are both acute (changes more or less rapidly with changes in blood glucose), and chronic (longer term, slower changing) lens shape changes in diabetics, making eye examinations – for vision correction, for instance – somewhat tricky.
Cerebrovascular disease
damage to the blood vessels in the brain, resulting in a stroke – either ischemic (a blocked blood vessel) or hemorrhagic (i.e., a leaking blood vessel). People with diabetes are at higher risk of cerebrovascular disease.
Certified diabetes educator (C.D.E.)
a health care professional who is qualified by the American Association of Diabetes Educators to teach people with diabetes how to manage their condition. In the US, the health care team for diabetes should ideally include a diabetes educator, preferably a C.D.E.
Charcot foot
a foot complication associated with diabetic neuropathy that results in destruction of joints and soft tissue. Also called "Charcot's joint", "neuropathic arthropathy", and "neuropathic joint disease". Named for a Parisian physician Jean-Martin Charcot.
Chemical diabetes
is a term that is no longer used. See: Impaired glucose tolerance.
Chlorpropamide
a pill taken to lower the level of glucose (sugar) in the blood. Only people with Type 2 diabetes take these pills. They are inappropriate for Type 1 diabetics as they increase the beta cell output of insulin which is normally missing in Type 1 diabetics due to beta cell destruction; there is no insulin production to be increased. See also: Oral hypoglycemic agents. This is one of the sulfonylureas (Diabinese).
Cholesterol
a waxy substance related to the steroid chemicals which serves as a substrate for many things including cell membrane construction. It is also involved in the transport of fat (i.e., lipids) in the blood. The transport mechanism (Low Density Cholesterol or High Density Cholesterol particles) varies, and not only in density. HDL is associated with the scavenging of plaque on arterial walls, while LDL is associated with deposition of such plaque. High cholesterol levels are statistically correlated with vessel disease and with heart attack in most, but not all, human populations. Cholesterol is manufactured in the body and is absorbed from food in the diet. Furthermore, some diet elements seem to be connected with higher body production of cholesterol (e.g., saturated fat).
Chronic
present over a long period of time. Diabetes and arthritis are examples of chronic diseases as there is yet no cure for either.
Circulation
the structures and control mechanisms which manage blood circulation. It includes the heart, lungs, arteries, veins, and capillaries, as well as several physical mechanisms (e.g., the Starling's law response of heart muscle) and hormone mechanism (e.g., the renin to angiotension linkage between the kidneys, lungs, heart, and blood pressure).
Clinical trial
a study carried out in humans (generally using volunteers) to answer a question such as whether a new treatment (or drug or exercise technique) is effective or safe as treatment. In the US, studies are broken into Phase I, Phase II, and Phase III trials. A properly designed study is carefully controlled and designed to produce reliable information. A poorly designed study does not produce reliable information, though its 'results' are often widely cited for various reasons (including commercial ones). Distinguishing between these is difficult or impossible for the non-specialist, and even for many specialists. For diabetes, industry organizations (e.g., the American Diabetes Association) maintain review committees which evaluate the results of many studies relevant to diabetes.
Coma
unconsciousness. For a diabetic, coma can be caused by hypoglycemia or by diabetic ketoacidosis.
Comatose
in a coma; not conscious.
Complications of diabetes
harmful effects that may happen when a person has diabetes. Some acute effects, such as hypoglycemia or hyperglycemia, can happen any time and usually can be resolved quickly. Others develop when a person has had diabetes for a time (often years, or even decades). These include damage to the retina of the eye (retinopathy), blood vessels (angiopathy), the nervous system (neuropathy), or the kidneys (nephropathy). Multiple studies very clearly show that keeping blood glucose levels as close to the normal, nondiabetic range as possible does very significantly help prevent, slow, or delay the long-term complications of diabetes (e.g., eye, kidney, blood vessel, and nerve damage).
Congenital defect
problems or conditions that are present at birth.
Congestive heart failure
heart failure caused by loss of pumping power by the heart, resulting in fluids collecting in the body. If in the lungs, it is often called Chronic Pulmonary Edema.
Continuous subcutaneous insulin infusion (CSII)
See: Insulin pump.
Contraindication
A condition that makes a treatment not helpful or even harmful.
Controlled disease
taking care of oneself so that a disease has a reduced adverse effect on the body. People with diabetes can "control" the disease by staying on their diets, by exercising, by taking medicine if it is prescribed, by regular exercise, and by monitoring their blood glucose. This care will help keep the glucose (sugar) level in the blood from becoming either too high or too low, reducing or eliminating acute problems, and if sustained over a long time, reduce the chance of chronic problems as well.
Conventional therapy
a system of diabetes management practiced by most people with diabetes who are treated by medically qualified personnel; the system consists of one or more insulin injections each day, daily self-monitoring of blood glucose, and a standard (or prescribed) program of nutrition and exercise. The main objective in this form of treatment is to avoid very high and very low blood glucose (sugar). Contrast w/ close control or intensive therapy. Also called: "Standard Therapy." See complications of diabetes.
Coronary disease
interference with the heart's blood supply, typically by clogging of coronary, or other, arteries. Ischemia means lack of oxygen which necessarily follows from one or more blocked arteries.
Coxsackie B4 virus
a virus which can trigger an auto-immune reaction which eventually results in a (mistaken) auto-immune attack on the beta cells. It is one of several such triggers, including other viruses. Some chemicals preferentially and directly attack the beta cells, and do not trigger the auto-immune attack (for instance a commercially used rat poison). If they are destroyed, the person becomes a Type I diabetic, no longer producing insulin internally.
Creatinine
a chemical normally found in the body. Its clearance rate by the kidney is a measure of renal function.
Cyclamate
a man-made chemical used instead of sugar in low calorie foods and drinks. Banned in the US (due to concerns about cancer risk increase in heavy users), not banned in Canada, Japan and the EU, even so. There are disagreements about the meaning of the clinical studies which caused concern.

== D ==
Dawn phenomenon
A sudden rise in blood glucose levels in the early morning hours. This condition sometimes occurs in people with type 1 (formerly known as insulin-dependent) diabetes and (rarely) in people with type 2 (formerly known as noninsulin-dependent) diabetes. Unlike the Somogyi effect, it is not a result of an insulin reaction. People who have high levels of blood glucose in the mornings before eating may need to monitor their blood glucose during the night. If blood glucose levels are rising, adjustments in evening snacks or insulin dosages may be recommended. See also: Somogyi effect.
Debridement
The removal of infected, hurt, or dead tissue. it is necessary to deprive bacteria of a growth medium and to provide intact tissues a 'clean' surface on which they can begin to repair damage.
Dehydration
loss of fluid in the body (usually water) resulting in abnormal concentrations of substances in the blood and fluids. Too high concentrations interfere with many body processes. Insufficient fluid intake, or excessive urine output or both, are the usual causes.
Delta cell
A type of cell in the pancreas clumped with other cells (in the islets of Langerhans). Delta cells make somatostatin, a hormone that is believed to control how the beta cells make and release insulin and how the alpha cells make and release glucagon.
Desensitization
A method to reduce or stop an allergic reaction to something. Success is variable for reasons unknown.
Dextrose (see #Glucose)
a variety of glucose. Glucose, like many biochemicals comes in different isomers. In biological tissues throughout the earth, only the dexter form is produced and used.
DESMOND
A NHS training course for newly diagnosed diabetics freely available in the UK.
Diabetes control and complications trial (DCCT)
A 10-year study (1983–1993) funded by the National Institute of Diabetes and Digestive and Kidney Diseases to assess the effects of intensive therapy on the long-term complications of diabetes. The study very clearly showed that intensive management (i.e., close control) of insulin-dependent diabetes prevents or slows the development of the long-term complications of diabetes (eye, kidney, and nerve damage caused by diabetes), essentially to the 'normal' level.
Diabetes distress, diabetes-related distress
The psychological burden of continuously managing diabetes, which induces stress, predisposes to depression, and can be helped if duly recognized.
Diabetes insipidus
a type of diabetes (excess urination) unrelated to diabetes mellitus.
Diabetes mellitus
A disease that occurs when the body is not able to use dietary carbohydrates (e.g., sugar, starch, ...) as it should. Caused by lack of insulin, inability to respond to insulin, or both.
Diabetic amyotrophy
A disease of the nerves leading to the muscles. This condition affects only one side of the body and occurs most often in older men with mild diabetes. See also: Neuropathy.
Diabetic angiopathy
See: Angiopathy.
Diabetic coma
see coma
Diabetic ketoacidosis (DKA)
see acidosis
Diabetic myelopathy
Spinal cord damage found in some people with diabetes.
Diabetic nephropathy
See: Nephropathy
Diabetic neuropathy
See: Neuropathy
Diabetic osteopathy
Bone disease secondary to chronic diabetes, such as loss of foot bone tissue as viewed by x-ray; often temporary. Also called "disappearing bone disease", although that name can refer to other forms of bone resorption too.
Diabetic retinopathy
damage to the retina caused by growth of very small blood vessels. The proliferative variety is dangerous and often leads to blindness. It has been the leading non0traumatic cause of blindness in adults in the developed world for much of the 20th century.
Diabetogenic
Causing diabetes; some drugs cause blood glucose (sugar) to rise temporarily. Other cause it to rise permanently; if so they have caused diabetes. A chemical used as rat poison is an example.
Diabetologist
A doctor who sees and treats people with diabetes mellitus.
Diabulimia
(Portmanteau of diabetes and bulimia) An eating disorder where Type 1 diabetics intentionally take less insulin than needed in order to lose weight. Without insulin, glucose becomes unusable and accumulates in the bloodstream (eventually being lost in urine), and the body is forced to use fat for energy. A dangerous practice, not only due to complications of diabetes, but the increased risk of diabetic ketoacidosis.
Diagnosis
A decision as to the cause of some symptoms or problem. A goal of most physicians is to eliminate as many possible causes as possible (the 'diagnostic differential tree') and so work toward making an affirmative diagnosis. Reaching this point suggests a course of treatment. Mistaken diagnoses are sometimes very serious problems as physicians concentrate on treatment after a diagnosis is reached, not retracing the diagnostic analysis. Ideally, diagnoses are always correct, but disease variations are such that they are sometimes in error. In the case of diabetes, the tests are very clear. If you do not have high blood glucose at times (e.g., when fasting), you should not be diagnosed as diabetic, though perhaps as "prediabetic". Every one has higher glucose levels for one or two hours after eating food which contains some types of carbohydrates.
Dialysis
providing kidney function artificially. This requires an artificial kidney (a dialysis machine) and relatively long periods hooked up to the machine every few days. It is not equivalent to a working kidney, but is sufficient to maintain life, sometimes for extended periods.
Diastolic blood pressure
See: Blood pressure.
Diet plan
See: Meal plan.
Dietitian
An expert in nutrition who helps people with special health needs plan the kinds and amounts of foods to eat. In the US, a registered dietitian (R.D.) has special training and experience. The health care team for diabetes should ideally include a dietitian, preferably an R.D.
Dilated pupil examination
A necessary part of an examination for diabetic eye disease. Special drops are used to enlarge the pupils, enabling the doctor to view the retina at the back of the eye for damage. See funduscopy.
Distal sensory neuropathy
See: Peripheral neuropathy.
Diuretic
a drug or substance which has the effect of increasing the amount of urine the kidneys excrete. Swollen feet and ankles are sometimes treated with diuretics. There are several classes, which act at different points in the water resorption portion of the kidney tubule.
Deoxyribonucleic acid
a stable molecule which can be replicated with few errors, and which is used to store information about protein structures. It also contains mechanisms to block or unblock the transcription of that information of selected proteins at appropriate times. It was the sequence of information in a single human's DNA (that of Dr Craig Venter) which was the primary initial object of the Human Genome Project. That, and continuing work is expected to increase understanding of body functions and most likely to more effective treatments for many diseases. Its amino acid code (DNA triplet to amino acid translation) is identical across all Terrestrial life except for a very few bacteria. DNA is the chief genetic information storage structure of nearly all life on Earth. In humans and other multi-cellular organisms, the exceptions all use RNA, which is a very closely related molecule. DNA is stored chiefly in the cell nucleus of plant and animal (including human) cells. Small amounts of DNA are also kept in the mitochondria, where fuel (chiefly glucose) is processed aerobically to produce high energy chemicals (ATP) which are used throughout the cell to power energy consuming reactions.
Dupuytren's contracture
A condition that causes the fingers to curve inward and may also affect the palm. The condition is more common in people with diabetes and may precede diabetes. The mechanism is unclear. Treatment is limited to surgery (typically only in severe cases) and is usually of limited value.
Dysglycemia (or dysglycaemia)
Abnormal blood sugar levels from any cause which results in disease. A condition resulting from a disorder of blood sugar metabolism. Usually the more specific terms hyperglycemia, hypoglycemia, or others are used instead, and dysglycemia is used only when a firm diagnosis has not yet been made.
Dyslipidemia (or dyslipidaemia)
Abnormal lipid levels in the blood. Includes levels that are too high (triglycerides, LDLs) and levels that are too low (HDLs). People with insulin resistance and diabetes often have dyslipidemia. Although the cause-and-effect involved is highly complex, the fact that they often coexist and cause problems is clear.

== E ==
Edema
collection of fluid in the tissues of a part of the body. Diabetics often have edemic feet due to the impaired circulation in them.
Electromyography EMG
Test used to diagnose neuropathy and check for nerve damage. It uses electrodes to measure speed of nerve signal transmission. Damaged nerves have characteristic changes in transmission.
Endocrine glands
several glands and tissues which secrete signaling chemicals (almost always in very very small quantities) which control the function of other tissues. Insulin is produced by the endocrine part of the pancreas (i.e., beta cells) and is the primary hormone controlling metabolism.
Endocrinologist
a physician with special training in the operation and diseases of the endocrine system (i.e., the endocrine glands and tissues).
Endogenous
Grown or made inside the body. Insulin made by a person's own pancreas is endogenous insulin. Insulin that is supplied from outside the body (i.e., injected or otherwise supplied) is exogenous.
End-stage renal disease (ESRD)
The final phase of many kidney diseases; treated by dialysis or kidney transplantation. See also: Dialysis; nephropathy.
Enzymes
proteins which have the effect of greatly increasing the reaction rate of specific chemical reactions. Reaction rates are controlled by activation energies specific to particular reactions, and enzymes have the effect of lowering the activation energy. In general enzymes are chemicals which are not consumed by the reaction. In that sense, they are catalysts.
Epidemiology
the study of the transmission of diseases. One of the first epidemiological investigations was that of Snow in 19th century London, who traced the spread of cholera to contaminated water supplies. Epidemiological studies can often provide a considerable insight into the nature of disease. For instance, the epidemiology of diabetes shows that it is not spread by infection; except in a very unusual sense, in the case of Type 1 diabetes.
Epinephrine (adrenaline)
a "neurotransmitter" at sympathetic nerve endings. And a hormone which has effects throughout the body. Produced in the adrenal glands, among others.
Etiology
the origin and development of a condition. The etiology of Type 1 diabetes is somewhat understood (an externally triggered auto-immune disease) while the etiology of Type 2 diabetes is currently unknown, though its epidemiology has established a strong genetic component.
Euglycemia
A normal level of glucose (sugar) in the blood.
Exchange lists
A grouping of foods by type to provide a rough way to help people on special diets keep to the diet. Each group lists food in serving sizes. A person can exchange, trade, or substitute a food serving in one group for another food serving in the same group as they have approximately equivalent amounts of a particular nutrient. The usual lists classify foods in six groups: (1) starch/bread, (2) meat, (3) vegetables, (4) fruit, (5) milk, and (6) fats. Within a food group, each serving has about the same amount of carbohydrate, protein, fat, and calories.
Exogenous
Grown or made outside the body; for instance, insulin made from pork or beef pancreas is exogenous insulin for people. Contrast endogenous.

== F ==
Fasting blood glucose test
A method for finding out how much glucose (sugar) is in the blood, at a time when recent food intake does not affect glucose levels. The test can aid in diagnosis; a single reading of 126 mg/dL (7 mmol/L) is diagnostic except in newborns or pregnant women or in some unusual other conditions. A blood sample is often taken in a lab or doctor's office. The test is often done in the morning before the person has first eaten. The normal, nondiabetic range for fasting blood glucose is between 70 and 110 mg/dL (5 – 7 mmol/L), depending on the person (there is some variations between individuals), whether the blood is from a vein or a capillary, and depending on how the measurement is made (e.g., on whole blood or just the plasma). It can also be done by anyone with a blood glucose meter, proper supplies, and an understanding of how to test using them.
Fats
food substances which are the chief energy storage mechanism in organisms such as plants and animals. Fat molecules are composed of fatty acid chains attached to a glycerol backbone, usually in threes. Fats vary in the details of just which fatty acid variants are attached. Possibilities include saturated (the usual case in animal source fats), mono or poly unsaturated (from many plant oils, have one (mono) or more (poly) double carbon bonds in the fatty acid chain), and in where the double bond is (at the omega carbon in the 3 position, or the 6 position or ...). Some fats are required in the human diet, they are the 'essential oils'. All other fats humans need can be made, at the cost of some energy, from those fats, or from other chemicals. Transfats are a class of fats which are very rare in nature, but very common in industrially processed oils as a consequence of "hydrogenation". It is becoming increasingly clear that ingestion of more than small quantities of transfats distorts some aspects of human biochemistry in ways which increase artery disease and heart disease, and so increase death rates. Saturated fats have a much smaller deleterious health effect.
Fatty acids
chains of carbon atoms with attached side groups. They are found in living tissues, typically in the form of triglycerides (three fatty acid chains attached to a glycerol backbone).
Fiber
usually carbohydrate which cannot be digested. It passes through the human digestive system without being digested or absorbed. Soluble fiber absorbs water in the intestines, insoluble does so much less. Fiber has effects on intestinal operations, and by extension, on other tissues. For instance, adequate fiber intake seems to have an effect on vascular health. The mechanisms by which these effects happen are largely speculative at present. One effect of dietary fiber, apparently especially soluble fiber, has is to increase stool size and softness. Dietary fibers, when eaten together with carbohydrates, delay the uptake of the carbohydrates.
Fluorescein angiography
A method of taking a picture of the flow of blood in the vessels of the eye by tracing the progress of an injected dye.
Food exchange
See: Exchange lists.
Foot care
Especially important for diabetics. This involves taking special steps to avoid foot problems such as sores, cuts, bunions, and calluses. Good care includes daily examination of the feet, toes, and toenails for problems of possible problems, and choosing shoes and socks (or stockings) that fit well and so do not cause pressure points, binding, or pinching. People with diabetes have to take special care of their feet because nerve damage and altered blood flow mean they will have less feeling in their feet than normal, and poorer healing than usual. They may not notice cuts and other problems as soon as they should. They will also heal less well than others.
Fractional urine
Urine that a person collects for a certain period of time during 24 hours; usually from breakfast to lunch, from lunch to dinner, from dinner to bedtime, and from bedtime to rising. Also called "block urine."
Fructose
a simple sugar (often found in fruit) which does not participate in the glucose metabolism control system. In the human diet, fructose is largely found in some fruit, but in the past few decades, it has been used as a sweetener in any foods in the form of high fructose corn syrup. It is also half of the common sugar molecule (i.e., sucrose); the other half is glucose. It has a parallel metabolic pathway to glucose but is handled only by the liver. It is also implicated in characteristic blood triglyceride profile changes. There is suspicion that prolonged high levels of fructose ingestion are a cause of obesity, and perhaps of diabetes.
Fundus of the eye
The central portion of the retina on back or deepest part of the eye. Damage to the fundus, even if the rest of the eye is in good condition, will have severe problems. For instance reading may become impossible.
Funduscopy
A test to look at the back area of the eye to see if there is any damage to the vessels that bring blood to the retina. The doctor uses a device called an ophthalmoscope to check the eye. There is also a special type of camera which takes photos of the eye (with dilated pupils) to record retinal conditions for future comparison.

== G ==
Galactose
a simple sugar which does not participate in the glucose metabolism control system. It is half of the disaccharide, lactose (milk sugar).
Gangrene
Infection of dead body tissue. It is most often caused by a loss of blood flow, especially in the legs and feet. Gangrene is particularly dangerous in that the infection cannot be reached by body defense systems and so can proceed without interference.
Gastroparesis
A form of nerve damage that affects the stomach and intestines. Food is not digested properly and does not move through in a normal way, resulting in vomiting, nausea, or bloating. It often interferes with diabetes management. See also: Autonomic neuropathy.
Gene
a unit of heredity. Eye color is a particularly simple system. There are blue eye genes and brown eye genes and one's eyes are brown if one of the two eye color genes is a brown one and blue if blue genes are inherited from both parents. Each gene is a segment of DNA and is often controlled by other genes. In the case of glucose absorption, the gene whose expressed protein opens the glucose ports in the cell wall is normally inhibited by another gene's product. We have finally come to understand the normal process in considerable detail; it is the same in nematode worms, fish, mice, pigs, cows, and people.
Genetic
See also: heredity.
Gestation
pregnancy and birth
Gestational diabetes mellitus (GDM)
A type of diabetes mellitus that can occur when a woman is pregnant. During the pregnancy (usually later in it), the woman may have glucose (sugar) in her blood at a higher than normal level. However, when the pregnancy ends, the blood glucose levels return to normal in about 95 percent of all cases. It MUST be treated carefully by a physician for it is dangerous to both mother and child. If treated properly, there are usually no lasting effects on either. Women who have had an episode of GDM are at higher risk of developing Type 2 diabetes later on.
Gingivitis
infection of the gums, often chronic and low grade.
Gland
a tissue which produces a product used elsewhere. The pancreas is a large gland, and a complex one. It produces considerable quantities of bile acids for use in the intestines; these are carried to the intestines via ducts and so the pancreas is a ducted gland. Parts of the pancreas (chiefly the Islets of Langerhans) produce very small amounts of chemicals which are released directly into the blood; the pancreas is also therefore a ductless gland as well. These later substances are hormones, and so the pancreas is also an endocrine gland.
Glaucoma
an increase in the internal pressure in the eye. It is usually caused by a reduction in the outflow of fluid. Sufficiently high and prolonged glaucoma causes reduced vision by preventing perfusion of the retina, and can lead to blindness.
Gliclazide
A pill taken to lower the level of glucose (sugar) in the blood. Only some people with noninsulin-dependent diabetes take these pills. See also: Oral hypoglycemic agents. One of the sulfonylureas. (Diamicron)
Glimepiride
A pill taken to lower the level of glucose (sugar) in the blood. Only some people with noninsulin-dependent diabetes take these pills. See also: Oral hypoglycemic agents. One of the sulfonylureas. (Amaryl)
Glipizide
A pill taken to lower the level of glucose (sugar) in the blood. Only some people with noninsulin-dependent diabetes take these pills. See also: Oral hypoglycemic agents. One of the sulfonylureas. (Glucotrol)
Glomerular filtration rate
A measure of the kidneys' ability to filter blood as part of the waste removal process.
Glomeruli
Network of tiny blood vessels in the kidneys where the blood is filtered and waste products are removed.
Glucagon
A hormone that raises the level of glucose (sugar) in the blood by forcing the liver to release some of its intracellular stores of glucose.
Glucose
a simple sugar which is the chief carbohydrate fuel in food. In the dextrose form isomer, it is the chief product of photosynthesis in plants.
Glucose tolerance test
A test to see if a person has diabetes. The test is usually given in a lab or doctor's office in the morning before the person has eaten. A first sample of blood is taken from the person. Then the person drinks a liquid that has a measured amount of glucose in it (typically 75 grams). After one hour, a second blood sample is drawn, and, after another hour, a third sample is taken. The object is to see how well the body deals with the glucose in the blood over time without interference from other foods. Depending on the local lab, the number and spacing of samples may vary.
Glyburide, also called Glibenclamide
A pill taken to lower the level of glucose (sugar) in the blood. Only some people with noninsulin-dependent diabetes take these pills. See also: Oral hypoglycemic agents. One of the sulfonylureas. (Diabeta; Glynase; Micronase; Euglucon)
Glycemic index
The effect of a food on blood glucose (sugar) levels over a period of time. Researchers have discovered that some kinds of foods raise blood glucose levels more quickly than other foods containing the same amount of carbohydrates, at least under laboratory conditions. Cooked carrots get glucose into the blood faster than pure glucose! In practice, foods are not eaten alone and the presence of other foods changes the measured results for the pure food. In addition, some foods do not have much carbohydrate even if they get it into the blood quickly. A better guide is glycemic density which combines the glycemic index with the amount of carbohydrate in the food.
Glycogen
A substance made from multiple glucose molecules. Sometimes called 'animal starch'. It is stored in liver and muscle cells and can be converted to glucose when needed. The glucose in liver glycogen is put back into the blood when required. That in muscle cells is not, as they lack the necessary enzymatic machinery to export glucose into the blood.
Glycogenesis
The process by which glycogen is formed from glucose. Controlled by insulin. See also: Glycogen.
Glycosuria
Having glucose (sugar) in the urine. This means that the renal threshold for glucose has been exceeded in the blood which is clear evidence of too high levels as the kidneys are ordinarily excellent at conserving glucose. For most kidneys, this is about 200 mg/dL.
Glycosylated hemoglobin test
A blood test that measures the level of a particular variety of hemoglobin (HbA1c) which is itself a measure of a person's average blood glucose level for the 3-month period before the test. Glucose reacts with proteins throughout the body; indeed, this is thought to be one, if not the primary, mechanism by which high glucose levels cause damage (see Maillard reaction in cooking for a parallel). One of those reactions with hemoglobin is irreversible and relatively easily detected. Its concentration is an index of the average blood glucose level throughout the life of the red blood cell (about 90 days in most cases). See: Hemoglobin A1C.

== H ==
HCF diet
A high-carbohydrate, high-fiber diet.
Hemochromatosis
A condition in which excess iron levels are deposited in body tissues, damaging them. Characteristically, it causes diabetes among its other effects. It can be caused too much iron intake (the normal body conserves iron very well, and has few routes for discarded excess iron). In an inherited form, it is the most common genetic diseases in those of Northern European ancestry. It is less common in other populations. See: Bronze diabetes.
Hemodialysis
A mechanical method of cleaning the blood for people who have kidney disease. See also: Dialysis.
Hemoglobin A1C (HbA1c)
Hemoglobin is the substance in red blood cells that carries oxygen to the cells. Hemoglobin reacts with blood glucose in various ways; the HbA1c sub-type reacts irreversibly. Since blood cells live about 90 days or so, the amount of HbA1c present at any time is a record of how much glucose has been in the blood during that period. It is, therefore, a record of the average blood glucose level over that period, though it is biased toward more recent conditions during that period.
Heredity
inheritance of various traits. One's heredity is the "sum" of one's genes, and their expression, passed on by one's parents. An additional, and poorly understood, source of inherited traits is exogenetic inheritance in which alterations to genetic material during life (e.g., from chemical exposures) changes the expression of genes which are passed to offspring.
High
The state of having high blood sugar.
High blood pressure
The pressure of blood in the arteries has normal values in a population. Blood pressure in an individual which is characteristically higher than that value is called high blood pressure. Exercise, psychological state (including the mere presence of medical folk in some cases), disease, and so on all affect blood pressure, so the determination is a statistical one. Higher than normal blood pressure is associated with, and perhaps even casual for some, assorted pathologies. Diabetics have higher rates of cardiovascular disease and higher rates of high blood pressure.
Hives
a skin condition caused, in most cases, by an allergic reaction to some substance or substances.
HLA antigens
Proteins on the outer part of body cells that are (effectively) unique to that person. HLA types are inherited, and some of them are connected with Type I diabetes in that their presence is a marker (or a cause?) of the susceptibility to an external trigger for the auto-immune reaction which attacks beta cells.
Home blood glucose monitoring
A way a person can test how much glucose (sugar) is in the blood. Also called self-monitoring of blood glucose. See also: Blood glucose monitoring.
Homeostasis
the operation of body systems which has the effect of keeping assorted conditions in an effectively constant state. Thus, increased water intake leads to increased urine production. Increased salt intake results in increased salt excretion. Lowered environmental temperature eventually starts chills and shivers, thus producing more heat by muscular activity. First explicitly noted in the 19th century by Claude Bernard who named it.
Hormone
a chemical released by one of the endocrine glands or tissues, and which has effects on other tissues. Insulin is a hormone as are glucagon, adrenaline, and angiotensin II.
Human insulin
Man-made insulins that is identical to the insulin produced by your own body. It is produced by bacteria which have had insulin genes installed into them. Human insulin has been available since October 1982. Genentech developed the first production mechanism.
Hyperglycemia
a condition in which glucose levels are higher than usual.
Hyperinsulinism
Too high a level of insulin in the blood. This often involves a condition in which the body produces too much insulin. Researchers believe that this condition may play a role in the development of noninsulin-dependent diabetes (or perhaps its side-effects) and in hypertension. See also: Syndrome X.
Hyperlipemia
See: Hyperlipidemia.
Hyperlipidemia
Too high a level of fats (lipids) in the blood. See also: Syndrome X.
Hyperosmolar coma
A coma (loss of consciousness) related to high levels of glucose (sugar) in the blood and requiring emergency treatment. A person with this condition is usually older and weak from loss of body fluids and weight. The person may or may not have a previous history of diabetes. Ketones (acids) are not typically present in the urine.
Hypertension
a condition in which blood pressure is higher than normal. See high blood pressure.
Hypoglycemia
a condition in which blood glucose levels are lower than normal. This can be caused by an overdose of insulin (too much or wrong type) relative to the amount and type of food and/or exercise.
Hypotension
Low blood pressure or a sudden drop in blood pressure. A person rising quickly from a sitting or reclining position may have a sudden fall in blood pressure, causing dizziness or fainting. See autonomic neuropathy.

== I ==
IDDM
See: Insulin-dependent diabetes mellitus. This term has been replaced by Type 1 diabetes.
IGT
See: Impaired glucose tolerance.
Immunosuppressive drugs
Drugs which interfere with the immune's system's ability to etect and destroy foreign cells, including transplanted tissue from a non identical twin. Most also reduce the ability to cope with infections. Those who have received a kidney or pancreas transplant must, in essentially all cases, be given drugs in this class to stop the body from rejecting the new organ tissue. Ciclosporin is a commonly used immunosuppressive drug.
Impaired fasting glucose (IFG)
Blood sugar level that is too high after fasting, although not so high as to signal diabetes. A type of prediabetes.
Impaired glucose tolerance (IGT)
Blood sugar levels too high after a glucose challenge, although not so high as to signal diabetes. A type of prediabetes. People with IGT may or may not proceed to develop diabetes. Other names (some of them obsolete) for IGT are "borderline," "subclinical," "chemical," or "latent" diabetes.
Implantable insulin pump
An insulin pump that is implantable rather than external. A small device placed inside of the body which delivers insulin in response to commands from a hand-held device called a programmer.
Impotence
inability to participate in sexual relations. In men, it is usually caused by failure of the complex mechanisms involved in erection. It is common in diabetic men, due to damage to the nerves involved in the erection sequence, and possibly due to microvascular damage.
Incidence
the rate of an occurrence of, for instance, an infection like measles or mumps or one of the types of diabetes.
Infusion Set
in a diabetic context, a tubing system to connect an insulin pump to the pump user, including a subcutaneous cannula, adhesive mount, quick-disconnect, and a pump cartridge connector.
Ingestion
Eating food, drinking water, or ingesting medicine by mouth.
Injection
Putting liquid into the body with a needle and syringe. Often directly into a vein, as for intravenous antibiotics in a hospital. for diabetes taking insulin, injection is usually subcutaneous (i.e. just under the skin) and not into a vein. In fact, injection of current insulins into a vein should be done only in a medical facility, and some insulin types should never be injected into a vein.
Insulin
a hormone produced by the beta cells in the Islet of Langerhans' beta cells. It is a very small protein and has effects all over the body, some connected with metabolism and others connected with arterial wall muscle tone, or electrolyte balances across cell membranes, etc. It is also the chief control mechanism for body metabolism.
Insulin allergy
This occurs when a person's body has an allergic or bad reaction to taking insulin made from non-human insulin (e.g., from pork or beef or from bacteria). the reaction can be because the insulin is not exactly the same as human insulin or because it has impurities. The allergy can be of two forms. In one, sometimes an area of skin becomes red and itchy around the place where the insulin is injected. This is called a local allergy. In another, there is a wider reaction, involving the blood or other organs. This is called a systemic allergy. The result can be hives or red patches all over the skin or may feel changes in heart rate or breathing rate. A doctor may treat the underlying allergy by prescribing purified insulins or by desensitization. The acute symptoms may also require treatment, possibly by anti-histamines. See also: Desensitization.
Insulin antagonists
Something that opposes or fights the action of insulin. Insulin lowers the level of glucose (sugar) in the blood, whereas glucagon raises it. Glucagon is, therefore, an antagonist of insulin.
Insulin binding
When insulin attaches itself to something else. This can occur in two ways. First, when a cell needs energy, insulin can bind with a special purpose receptor on the surface of a cell (about 2/3 of human body cells, including muscles, but not including nerve cells). The cell then can bring glucose (sugar) inside; thus enabling energy production in the cell. Some cells can store glucose internally (liver cells and muscle cells primarily), but others, most importantly, nerve cells, cannot. With the help of insulin, the cell can absorb 'fuel' and proceed to do its work. But sometimes the body acts against itself. In this second case, the insulin binds with the proteins that are supposed to tag antigens (substances or fragments of cells) which are foreign to the body (i.e., antibodies). If the insulin is an injected form and not made internally, the body may see the insulin as an outside or "foreign" substance. When the foreign insulin binds with the antibodies, it does cannot work as intended.
Insulin-dependent diabetes mellitus (IDDM)
An out-of-date term for Type 1 diabetes mellitus. See: Type 1 diabetes mellitus.
Insulin-induced atrophy
Small dents that form on the skin when a person keeps injecting a needle in the same spot. They are harmless. See also: Lipoatrophy; injection site rotation.
Insulin-induced hypertrophy
Small lumps that form under the skin when a person keeps injecting a needle in the same spot. See also: Lipodystrophy; injection site rotation.
Insulin pen
An insulin injection device the size of a pen that includes a needle attached to a vial of insulin. It can be used instead of syringes for giving insulin injections.
Insulin pump
a device which provides a steady (or intermittent, depending on design and adjustments) infusion of insulin. Pumps can be implantable (see implantable insulin pump) or external. the latter use a subcutaneous catheter.
Insulin reaction
Too low a level of blood glucose (i.e., 'sugar') in the blood; also called hypoglycemia. This occurs when a person with diabetes has injected too much insulin, eaten too little food, or exercised without compensating for the increased glucose uptake caused by exercise. The person may feel hungry, nauseated, weak, nervous, shaky, confused, and sweaty. Eating small amounts of glucose converting sugar or starch (glucose, sucrose (1/2 glucose) or starch (all glucose)), sweet juice with glucose or sucrose, or food with such sugar will usually help the person feel better within 10–15 minutes. Fat or protein in the food or drink will delay absorption and should be avoided. So a glucose tablet is ideal, a candy bar or pastry is not (both contain fat in addition to starch and usually sugar). Orange juice works, but less well than intended, as its main carbohydrate is fructose. See also: Hypoglycemia; insulin shock.
Insulin receptors
Protein complexes on the surface of a cell that allows the cell to join or bind with insulin that is in the blood. When the vrll membrane receptor and insulin bind, the cell takes up glucose (sugar) from the blood and can use it for energy.
Insulin resistance
a condition in which a cell is resistant to insulin action, usually as a result of Type 2 diabetes which is characterized by insulin resistance in about two-thirds of the body's cells (those which require insulin in order to absorb glucose from the blood). The result is that the beta cells can no longer regulate body metabolism correctly.
Insulin resistance syndrome
A syndrome (set of signs and symptoms) resulting from insulin resistance. It is also called metabolic syndrome.
Insulin shock
A severe condition that occurs when the level of blood glucose (sugar) drops too far and quickly. The signs are shaking, sweating, dizziness, double vision, convulsions, and collapse. Insulin shock may occur when an insulin reaction is not treated quickly enough. In severe cases, brain damage, nerve damage, or even death is possible. Formerly used, in hospitals, as a treatment for some kinds of mental illness. See also: Hypoglycemia; insulin reaction.
Insulinoma
A tumor of the beta cells in areas of the pancreas called the islets of Langerhans. Although not usually cancerous, such tumors may cause the body to make extra insulin and may lead to a blood glucose (sugar) level that is too low.
Intermittent claudication
Pain in the muscles of the leg that occurs off and on, usually while walking or exercising, and results in lameness (claudication). The pain results from a narrowing of the blood vessels feeding the muscle. Drugs are available to treat this condition.
Intensive management or Intensive insulinotherapy
Intramuscular injection
Putting a fluid into a muscle with a needle and syringe.
Intravenous injection
Putting a fluid into a vein with a needle and syringe.
Islet cell Transplantation
Moving the beta (islet) cells from a donor pancreas and putting them into a person whose pancreas has stopped producing insulin. The beta cells make the insulin that most cells in the human body require to absorb glucose from the blood. Transplanting islet cells may one day help many people with diabetes, and the procedure is currently in the experimental stage.
Islets of Langerhans
Groups of cells in the pancreas. Some of them make and secrete hormones that help the body break down and use food. They were noticed by Paul Langerhans, a German medical student, in 1869; these clusters throughout the pancreas serve several functions. There are currently five known types of cells in an islet: beta cells, which make insulin and C-peptide; alpha cells, which make glucagon; delta cells, which make somatostatin; F cells which make pancreatic polypeptide, and D1 cells, about which little is known. The names of the cell types vary with location; in the UK they have slightly different names than in the US.

== J ==
Jet injector
A device that uses high pressure to propel insulin through the skin and into the body.
Juvenile onset diabetes
Former term for insulin-dependent or type I diabetes. See: Insulin-dependent diabetes mellitus.

== K ==
Ketoacidosis
A kind of acidosis characteristic of uncontrolled diabetes. It is not uncommon among diabetics, especially type 1 diabetics. See acidosis
Ketone bodies
commonly called ketones—Three chemicals produced during ketosis (i.e., fat metabolism) and which are released in large quantities during abnormal fat processing. They are, together, quite acidic and if prolonged may lead to acidosis. Oddly, they are not all ketones chemically. The name is a historical leftover, but the chemical smell characteristic of ketoacidosis is an acetone (i.e., ketone) smell.
Ketonuria
Having ketone bodies in the urine; a warning sign of diabetic ketoacidosis (DKA). Ketone test strips can be used to detect them.
Ketosis
fat metabolism. It is characteristic of ordinary metabolism, when glucose is not available, but can become abnormal, leading to ketoacidosis under some conditions. It is not uncommon among diabetics, especially type 1 diabetics.
Kidney disease
Any one of several chronic conditions that are caused by damage to the cells of the kidney. People who have had diabetes for a long time may have kidney damage. Also called nephropathy.
Kidneys
organs which produce urine by excreting blood plasma and then resorbing important chemicals. Glucose and proteins are especially well resorbed, such that the presence of either is evidence of serious problems. Possibly including diabetes. The remainder is urine.
Kidney threshold
The point at which the blood is holding too much of a substance such as glucose (sugar) and the kidneys "spill" the excess sugar into the urine. In most people, the renal threshold for glucose is about twice the normal blood glucose level. See also: Renal threshold.
Kussmaul breathing
The rapid, deep, and labored breathing of people who have ketoacidosis or who are in a diabetic coma. Kussmaul breathing is named for Adolph Kussmaul, the 19th century German doctor who first noted it. Also called "air hunger."

== L ==
Labile diabetes
When a person's blood glucose (sugar) level swings quickly from high to low and from low to high. Also called brittle diabetes.
Lactic acidosis
A buildup of lactic acid in the body due to anaerobic use of glucose as a fuel. It is normal when exercising beyond your aerobic capacity and recovery is rapid and complete, as the lactic acid is oxidized as fuel when oxygen becomes available (generally after a period of deep breathing).
Lactose
a disacchararide characteristic of milk, and the only carbohydrate with a beta attachment (characteristic of cellulose) for which humans ever have an enzyme which can break the bond. It is not very sweet to the human taste. In humans, it requires a special enzyme (lactase) for disassembly during digestion. Most humans lose this enzyme in adulthood and milk consumed by those deficient in it encounter problems (e.g., gas, pain, ...) when it becomes available to intestinal bacteria. Some populations do retain the enzyme and can consume milk in adulthood without trouble. Many milk products have already been processed in such a way as to remove or modify lactose: cheeses, most yogurts, cottage cheese, etc. And milk treated with lactase is also safe for the lactose intolerant.
Lancet
A fine, sharp-pointed blade or needle for pricking the skin.
Laser treatment
Using a special strong beam of light of one color (laser) to heal a damaged area. A person with diabetes might be treated with a laser beam to heal blood vessels in the eye. See also: Photocoagulation.
Latent diabetes
Former term for impaired glucose tolerance. See also: Impaired glucose tolerance.
Lente insulin
A type of insulin that is intermediate-acting, between NPH insulin and ultra-lente insulin.
Limited joint mobility
A form of arthritis involving the hand; it causes the fingers to curve inward and the skin on the palm to tighten and thicken. This condition mainly affects people with Type 1 diabetes.
Lipid
Fat / oil. Usually, used in reference to fat in the human body.
Lipoatrophy
Small dents in the skin that form when a person keeps injecting the needle in the same spot. See also: Lipodystrophy.
Lipodystrophy
Lumps or small dents in the skin that form when a person keeps injecting the needle in the same spot.
Low
The state of having low blood sugar.

== M ==
Macroangiopathy
See: Angiopathy.
Macrosomia
Abnormally large; in a diabetes context, it is the phenomenon of abnormally large babies that may be born to women with diabetes whose pregnancies are not closely monitored.
Macrovascular disease
A disease of the large blood vessels that sometimes occurs when a person has had diabetes for a long time.
Macular edema
A swelling (edema) in the macula, an area near the center of the retina of the eye that is responsible for fine or reading vision. Macular edema is a common complication associated with diabetic retinopathy. See also: Diabetic retinopathy; retina.
Maturity-onset diabetes
Former term for noninsulin-dependent or type 2 diabetes. See: Non-insulin-dependent diabetes mellitus.
Maturity onset diabetes of the young (MODY)
One of at least six rare types of diabetes mellitus caused by genetic defect.
Meal plan
A guide for controlling the amount of calories, carbohydrates, proteins, and fats a person eats. People with diabetes can use such plans as the Exchange Lists or the Point System to help them plan their meals so that they can keep their diabetes under control. See also: Exchange lists; point system.
Medical identification tag
Cards, bracelets, or necklaces with a written message used by people with diabetes or other medical problems to alert others in case of a medical emergency such as coma.
Metabolic syndrome (syndrome X, insulin resistance syndrome)
A set of signs and symptoms correlated with both insulin resistance and risk of cardiovascular disease. The set can be summed up mainly by high blood pressure, unhealthy cholesterol levels (high LDL, low HDL), chronic mild high blood sugar, and tendency toward overweight, especially in the abdomen. Metabolic syndrome overlaps or correlates with prediabetes.
Metabolism
metabolism is the sum of all the processes involved in using food to produce chemical energy for cell functions. It is a complex interaction of enzymes, substrates, intermediate products, etc. diabetes mellitus is a derangement of metabolism.
Metformin
A drug treatment for type 2 diabetes; belongs to a class of drugs called biguanides. First-line pharmacotherapy for type 2 diabetes mellitus.
Mg/dL
Milligrams per deciliter. How much glucose (sugar) is in a specific amount of blood. In self-monitoring of blood glucose, test results are given as the amount of glucose in milligrams per deciliter of blood. A fasting reading of 70 to 110 mg/dL is considered in the normal (nondiabetic) range. (This is the standard measurement of blood sugar in the US. The rest of the world uses mmol/L)
Microaneurysm
A small swelling that forms on the side of tiny blood vessels. These small swellings may break and bleed into nearby tissue. People with diabetes sometimes get microaneurysms in the retina of the eye.
Microangiopathy
See: Angiopathy.
Microvascular disease
Disease of the smallest blood vessels that sometimes occurs when a person has had diabetes for a long time.
Mixed dose
Combining two kinds of insulin in one injection. A mixed dose commonly combines regular insulin, which is fast acting, with a longer acting insulin such as NPH. A mixed dose insulin schedule may be prescribed to provide both short-term and long-term coverage.
mmol/L
Millimoles per litre. The world-standard (excepting the US) designated SI unit for the measurement of blood sugar levels. It is the concentration by molecular weight in a set amount of liquid.
Mononeuropathy
A form of diabetic neuropathy affecting a single nerve. The eye is a common site for this form of nerve damage. See also: Neuropathy.
Morbidity rate
the rate at which
Mortality rate
the rate at which death occurs (usually used as a statistical shorthand in regard to an infection or other condition).
Myocardial infarction
heart attack. The words mean heart muscle blockage.
Myo-inositol
A substance in the cell that is thought to play a role in helping the nerves to work. Low levels of myo-inositol may be involved in diabetic neuropathy.

== N ==
National Institute of Diabetes and Digestive and Kidney Diseases (NIDDK)
One of the 17 institutes that make up the National Institutes of Health, an agency of the Public Health Service.
Necrobiosis lipoidica diabeticorum
A skin condition usually on the lower part of the legs. The lesions can be small or extend over a large area. They are usually raised, yellow, and waxy in appearance and often have a purple border. Young women are most often affected. This condition occurs in people with diabetes, or it may be a sign of diabetes. It also occurs in people who do not have diabetes.
Neovascularization
When new, tiny blood vessels grow in a new place, for example, out from the retina. See also: Diabetic retinopathy.
Nephrologist
a physician specializing in diseases of and treatment of the kidneys
Nephropathy
Disease of the kidneys caused by damage to the small blood vessels or to the units in the kidneys that clean the blood. People who have had diabetes for a long time may have kidney damage.
Nerve conduction studies
Tests to determine nerve function; can detect early neuropathy.
Neurologist
a physician specializing in diseases of and treatment of the nervous system.
Neuropathy
nerve damage. In a diabetic context, a chronic complication of diabetes. Damage usually appears in the longest nerves, for reasons we only dimly understand, resulting in loss of sensation to the feet and lower legs. The damage is almost always bilateral. Loss of reflexes is also common. Neuropathy can also affect the hands, motor nerves, and the autonomic system.
NIDDM
See: Non-insulin-dependent diabetes mellitus.
Non-insulin-dependent diabetes mellitus (NIDDM)
Out-of-date name for Type 2 diabetes mellitus. See: Type 2 diabetes mellitus.
Noninvasive blood glucose monitoring
A way to measure blood glucose without having to prick the finger to obtain a blood sample. Several noninvasive devices are currently being developed.
Nonketotic coma
A type of coma caused by a lack of insulin. A nonketotic crisis means: (1) very high levels of glucose (sugar) in the blood; (2) absence of ketoacidosis; (3) great loss of body fluid; and (4) a sleepy, confused, or comatose state. Nonketotic coma often results from some other problem such as a severe infection or kidney failure.
NPH insulin
A type of insulin that is intermediate-acting.
Nutrition
The proper levels of needed ingredients in the diet. Thus, '...his nutrition has been deficient in the past several weeks, as he is showing signs of scurvy, the deficiency disease associated with inadequate levels of vitamin C'.
Nutritionist
See: Dietitian.

== O ==
Obesity
the condition of having more weight than is best. What is best is less easy to determine. At a gross level, insurance company records can define obesity, or increased understanding of optimum levels of fat can define them. Fashion is the least sensible source of a standard for the proper level of fat in a person.
Obstetrician
a physician specializing in pregnancy and delivery of children.
OGTT
See: Oral glucose tolerance test.
Ophthalmologist
a physician specializing in diseases of and treatment of the eyes.
Optometrist
A person professionally trained to test the eyes and to detect and treat eye problems and some diseases by prescribing and adapting corrective lenses and other optical aids and by suggesting eye exercise programs.
Oral glucose tolerance test (OGTT)
Oral hypoglycemic agents
Pills or capsules that people take to lower the level of glucose (sugar) in the blood.
Overt diabetes
Diabetes in the person who shows clear sign/s of the disease such as a great thirst and the need to urinate often.

== P ==
Pancreas
an abdominal organ with multiple functions. It is a ducted organ which produces chemicals used in the intestines for digestion. It is also an endocrine gland producing several hormones in the islets of Langerhans. The most notable of these latter is insulin.
Pancreas transplant
A surgical procedure that involves replacing the pancreas of a person who has diabetes with a healthy pancreas that can make insulin.
Pancreatectomy
A procedure in which a surgeon takes out the pancreas.
Pancreatitis
inflammation and irritation of the pancreas. Can be caused by several conditions. Infection is one, duct blockage is another.
Peak action
The time period when the effect of something is as strong as it can be such as when insulin in having the most effect on lowering the glucose (sugar) in the blood.
Periodontal disease
usually an infection or inflammation of the gums.
Periodontist
A specialist in the treatment of diseases of the gums.
Peripheral neuropathy
Nerve damage, usually affecting the feet and legs; causing pain, numbness, or a tingling feeling. Also called "somatic neuropathy" or "distal sensory polyneuropathy."
Peripheral vascular disease (PVD)
Disease in the large blood vessels of the arms, legs, and feet. People who have had diabetes for a long time may get this because major blood vessels in their arms, legs, and feet are blocked and these limbs do not receive enough blood.
Peritoneal dialysis
A way to clean the blood of people who have kidney disease. See also: Dialysis.
Pharmacist
practitioner of pharmacy.
Photocoagulation
Using a special strong beam of light (laser) to seal off bleeding blood vessels such as in the eye. The laser can also burn away blood vessels that should not have grown in the eye. This is the main treatment for diabetic retinopathy.
Pituitary gland
an endocrine gland at the base of the brain. It is usually called the master gland, for its signals control the operation of most of the other endocrine glands.
Podiatrist
A doctor who treats and takes care of people's feet.
Podiatry
The care and treatment of human feet in health and disease.
Point system
A way to plan meals that uses points to rate food. The foods are placed in four classes: calories, carbohydrates, proteins, and fats. Each food is given a point value within its class. A person with a planned diet for the day can choose foods in the same class that have the same point values for meals and snacks.
Polydipsia
A great thirst that lasts for long periods of time; a sign of diabetes.
Polyphagia
Great hunger; a sign of diabetes. People with this great hunger often lose weight.
Polyunsaturated fats
A type of fat that usually comes from plants. See also: Fats.
Polyuria
Having to urinate often; a common sign of diabetes.
Postprandial blood glucose
Blood taken 1–2 hours after eating to see the amount of glucose (sugar) in the blood.
Prediabetes
A precursor stage before diabetes mellitus in which not all of the symptoms required to diagnose diabetes are present, but blood sugar is abnormally high. Impaired fasting glucose and impaired glucose tolerance are types of prediabetes.
Preeclampsia
A condition that some women with diabetes have during the late stages of pregnancy. Two signs of this condition are high blood pressure and swelling because the body cells are holding extra water.
Prevalence
rate of happening of something. Example: there is a high prevalence of sleeping amongst humans.
Previous abnormality of glucose tolerance (PrevAGT)
People who have had above-normal levels of blood glucose (sugar) when tested for diabetes in the past but who show as normal on a current test. PrevAGT used to be called either "latent diabetes" or "prediabetes."
Prognosis
Telling a person now what is likely to happen in the future because of having a disease.
Proinsulin
The substance made first in the pancreas that is then made into insulin.
Proliferative retinopathy
damage to the retina caused by growth of small blood vessels. the proliferative variety is dangerous to sight.
Prosthesis
a replacement for a body part. For instance, a foot or leg.
Protein
a class of biochemicals made from amino acids in specific sequences. Proteins can be very large molecules with very specific shapes in folds and sheets, etc. They have three prominent functions in the body. Some varieties are, save for bone, the structural components of cells and so of the body. Other varieties are enzymes, which coordinate the chemical reactions which are required for life: metabolism, protein construction and degradation, reproduction, etc. A smaller third class of proteins are hormones. Insulin, central to diabetes mellitus, is a protein and is a very small one.
Proteinuria
presence of protein in urine, and evidence of serious malfunction of the kidneys as protein is normally very carefully conserved.
Pruritus
Itching skin; may be a symptom of diabetes.
Purified insulins
Insulins with much less of the impure proinsulin. It is thought that the use of purified insulins may help avoid or reduce some of the problems of people with diabetes such as allergic reactions.

== R ==
Rebound
A swing to a high level of glucose (sugar) in the blood after having a low level. See also: Somogyi effect.
Receptors
Regular insulin
A type of insulin that is fast acting.
Renal
Related to the kidneys.
Renal threshold
When the blood is holding so much of a substance such as glucose (sugar) that the kidneys allow the excess to spill into the urine. This is also called "kidney threshold," "spilling point," and "leak point."
Retina
Retinopathy
See also: Diabetic retinopathy.
Risk factor
Anything that raises the chance that a person will get a disease. With noninsulin-dependent diabetes, people have a greater risk of getting the disease if they weigh a lot more (20 percent or more) than they should.

== S ==
Saccharin
A human-made sweetener that people use in place of sugar because it has no calories.
Saturated fat
A type of fat that comes primarily from animals. See also: Fats.
Secondary diabetes
When a person gets diabetes because of another disease or because of taking certain drugs or chemicals.
Secrete
To make and give off such as when the beta cells make insulin and then release it into the blood so that the other cells in the body can use it to turn glucose (sugar) into energy.
Segmental transplantation
A surgical procedure in which a part of a pancreas that contains insulin-producing cells is placed in a person whose pancreas has stopped making insulin.
Self-monitoring of blood glucose
A way as person can test how much glucose (sugar) is in the blood. Also called home blood glucose monitoring. See also: Blood glucose monitoring.
Shock
A severe condition that disturbs the body. A person with diabetes can go into shock when the level of blood glucose (sugar) drops suddenly. See also: Insulin shock.
Sliding scale
Adjusting insulin on the basis of blood glucose tests, meals, and activity levels.
Somatic neuropathy
See: Peripheral neuropathy.
Somatostatin
A hormone made by the delta cells of the pancreas (in areas called the islets of Langerhans). Scientists think it may control how the body secretes two other hormones, insulin and glucagon.
Somogyi effect
A swing to a high level of glucose (sugar) in the blood from an extremely low level, usually occurring after an untreated insulin reaction during the night. The swing is caused by the release of stress hormones to counter low glucose levels. People who experience high levels of blood glucose in the morning may need to test their blood glucose levels in the middle of the night. If blood glucose levels are falling or low, adjustments in evening snacks or insulin doses may be recommended. This condition is named after Dr. Michael Somogyi, the man who first wrote about it. Also called "rebound hypoglycemia".
Sorbitol
a kind of combination alcohol-sugar. A member of the polyol class of chemicals.
Spilling point
When the blood is holding so much of a substance such as glucose (sugar) that the kidneys allow the excess to spill into the urine. See also: Renal threshold.
Split dose
Division of a prescribed daily dose of insulin into two or more injections given over the course of a day. Also may be referred to as multiple injections. Many people who use insulin feel that split doses offer more consistent control over blood glucose (sugar) levels.
Stiff hand syndrome
Thickening of the skin of the palm that results in loss of ability to hold hand straight. This condition occurs only in people with diabetes.
Stroke
a non-traumatic interruption in the blood supply to an organ, particularly the brain. There are two varieties, the bleeding sort in which a blood vessel leaks blood into tissues. In the brain, these produce hematomas (i.e., pools of blood within the skull). The other kind is an ischemic stroke in which the flow of blood is interrupted, often because of vessel blockage by a clot or plaque. Both kill tissue and can cause considerable damage, including death.
Subclinical diabetes
See: Impaired glucose tolerance.
Subcutaneous injection
Putting a fluid into the tissue under the skin with a needle and syringe. See also: Injection.
Sucrose
Sugar
A class of carbohydrates that taste sweet. Sugar is a quick and easy fuel for the body to use. Types of sugar are lactose, glucose, fructose, and sucrose.
Sulfonylureas
Pills or capsules that people take to lower the level of glucose (sugar) in the blood. See also: Oral hypoglycemic agents.
Symptom
An indication of disease; a departure from normal function or feeling which is noticed by the person experiencing it. Having to urinate often is a symptom of diabetes. A symptom can be verified only by the person who has it, whereas a sign can be verified by both that person and others. For example, skin redness is a sign.
Syndrome
A set of signs or a series of events occurring together that make up a disease or health problem.
Syndrome X/Metabolic syndrome
See: Metabolic syndrome.
Syringe
Systemic
Conditions that affect the entire body. Diabetes is a systemic disease because it involves many parts of the body such as the pancreas, eyes, kidneys, heart, and nerves.
Systolic blood pressure
See: Blood pressure.

== T ==
Team management
A diabetes treatment approach in which medical care is provided by a physician, physician assistant, diabetes educator, dietitian, and behavioral scientist working together with the patient.
Thrush
An infection of the mouth. In people with diabetes, this infection may be caused by high levels of glucose (sugar) in mouth fluids, which helps the growth of fungus that causes the infection. Patches of whitish-colored skin in the mouth are signs of this disease.
Tolazamide
A pill taken to lower the level of glucose (sugar) in the blood. Only some people with noninsulin-dependent diabetes take these pills. See also: Oral hypoglycemic agents. (Tolinase)
Tolbutamide
A pill taken to lower the level of glucose (sugar) in the blood. Only some people with noninsulin-dependent diabetes take these pills. See also: Oral hypoglycemic agents. (Orinase)
Toxemia of pregnancy (preeclampsia)
A condition in pregnant women involving high blood pressure, protein in the urine, and edema. It can harm both mother and child, but resolves after delivery. The first signs of toxemia are swelling near the eyes and ankles (edema), headache, high blood pressure, and weight gain that the mother might confuse with the normal weight gain of being pregnant. The mother may have both glucose (sugar) and acetone in her urine. The mother should tell the doctor about these signs at once. Women who become diabetic during their pregnancies have a 15% higher chance of developing preeclampsia; women who are diabetic before becoming pregnant have a 30% chance of developing preeclampsia.
Toxic
Harmful; having to do with poison.
Transcutaneous electric nerve stimulation (TENS)
A treatment for painful neuropathy.
Trauma
Triglyceride
Twenty-four hour urine
The total amount of a person's urine for a 24-hour period.
Diabetes mellitus type 1
It is a chronic condition in which the pancreas makes little or no insulin because the beta cells have been destroyed. About two-thirds of body cells require insulin to absorb glucose and in its absence, they will not be able to use the glucose (blood sugar) for energy. Type 1 diabetes usually comes on abruptly, although the damage to the beta cells may begin much earlier. Typical signs of Type 1 diabetes are a great thirst, hunger, a need to urinate often, and loss of weight. To treat the disease, the person must inject insulin and test blood glucose frequently. Type 1 diabetes usually occurs in children and adults who are under age 30. This type of diabetes used to be known as "insulin-dependent diabetes," "juvenile diabetes," "juvenile-onset diabetes" and "ketosis-prone diabetes."
Diabetes mellitus type 2
The most common form of diabetes mellitus; about 90 to 95 percent of people who have diabetes in the developed world have Type 2 diabetes. Unlike Type 1 diabetes, in which the pancreas makes no insulin, people with Type 2 diabetes produce some insulin, sometimes even large amounts. However, either their bodies do not produce enough insulin or their body cells are resistant to insulin (see Insulin Resistance). People with Type 2 diabetes can often control their condition by losing weight through diet and exercise. If not, they may need to combine insulin or a pill with diet and exercise. Generally, Type 2 diabetes occurs in people who are over age 40. Most of the people who have this type of diabetes are overweight. This type of diabetes used to be known as "noninsulin-dependent diabetes," "adult-onset diabetes," "maturity-onset diabetes," "ketosis-resistant diabetes" and "stable diabetes."

== U ==
Ulcer
A break in the skin; a deep sore. People with diabetes may get ulcers from minor scrapes on the feet or legs, from cuts that heal slowly, or from the rubbing of shoes that do not fit well. Ulcers can become infected.
Ultralente insulin
A type of insulin that is long acting.
Medical ultrasound
Unit of insulin
The basic measure of insulin. U-100 insulin means 100 units of insulin per milliliter (mL) or cubic centimeter (cc) of solution. Most insulin made today in the United States is U-100.
Unsaturated fats
A type of fat. See also: Fats.
Unstable diabetes
A type of diabetes when a person's blood glucose (sugar) level often swings quickly from high to low and from low to high. Also called "brittle diabetes" or "labile diabetes."
Urea
Urine testing
Checking urine to see if it contains glucose (sugar) and ketones. Special strips of paper or tablets (called reagents) are put into a small amount of urine or urine plus water. Changes in the color of the strip show the amount of glucose or ketones in the urine. Urine testing is less desirable than blood testing for monitoring the level of glucose in the body. See also: Blood glucose monitoring; reagents.
Urologist

== V ==
Vaginitis
An infection of the vagina usually caused by a fungus. A woman with this condition may have itching or burning and may notice a discharge. Women who have diabetes may develop vaginitis more often than women who do not have diabetes.
Vascular
Relating to the body's blood vessels (arteries, veins, and capillaries).
Vein
Visceral neuropathy
Vitrectomy
Removing the gel from the center of the eyeball because it has blood and scar tissue in it that blocks sight. An eye surgeon replaces the clouded gel with a clear fluid. See also: Diabetic retinopathy.
Vitreous humor
The clear jelly (gel) that fills the center of the eye.

== X ==
Xylitol
A sweetener found in plants and used as a substitute for sugar; it is called a nutritive sweetener because it provides calories, just like sugar.
