= Desmond =

Desmond or Desmond's may refer to:

== Arts and entertainment ==
- Desmond (novel), a 1792 novel by Charlotte Turner Smith
- Desmond's, a 1990s British television sitcom

== Places ==
- Kingdom of Desmond, a medieval Irish kingdom
- Desmond, Western Australia, an abandoned mining town

== Science and technology ==
- DESMOND (diabetes) (Diabetes Education and Self Management for Ongoing and Newly Diagnosed), a UK NHS diabetes education programme
- Desmond (software), molecular dynamics simulation software

== Other uses ==
- Desmond (name), a given name, surname and stage name, including lists of people and fictional characters
- Earl of Desmond, a title in the Peerage of Ireland
- Storm Desmond, a 2015 cyclone in Britain and Ireland
- Desmond (horse) (1896–1913), a Thoroughbred racehorse
- Desmond's (department store), a former American store
- Desmond, slang term for the British 2:2 degree classification

== See also ==
- Desmond Castle (disambiguation)
- Desmond Rebellions, Irish rebellions during the 16th century led by the Earl of Desmond
- Limerick Desmond League, an association football league in west County Limerick
- Desman, a tribe of aquatic mammals
