= Diane Kress =

- Born: February 27, 1959 (age 67)
- Education: Marywood University
- Occupations: Dietitian; educator; business owner; author

Diane Kress (born February 27, 1959) is an American registered dietitian, certified diabetes educator, business owner and author, including writing the book The Metabolism Miracle, which was a New York Times bestseller. She owns and operates The Nutrition Center of Morristown in New Jersey.

== Early life and education ==
She is a 1981 graduate of Marywood University with a major in nutrition science.

Before writing, Kress struggled with her weight and was diagnosed with diabetes.

== Career ==
Kress specializes in medical nutrition therapy for overweight and obesity, metabolic syndrome, pre-diabetes, and type 2 diabetes. From 2000 to 2012 she had a private practice in Morristown, New Jersey.

While teaching a weight-reduction program, she researched, developed and authored The Metabolism Miracle book and concept. In July 2010, The Metabolism Miracle made The New York Times Best Seller list. Since then, she has published three more books: The Metabolism Miracle Cookbook, The Diabetes Miracle, and The Metabolism Miracle Update. Her books are published in eight languages. In 2013, Diane Kress was named to the top 10 list of RDs by Today's Dietitian magazine.

She is owner and director of the Nutrition Center of Morristown, which opened in 2003 and specializes in diabetes management, metabolic disorders and weight reduction.

=== Books ===
- The Metabolism Miracle (3rd ed.). Da Capo Press. May 31, 2016. ISBN 978-0738218908.
- Metabolism Miracle Cookbook. Da Capo Press. 2010. ISBN 978-0738214252.
- The Diabetes Miracle. Da Capo Press. 2012. ISBN 978-0738215051.
- The Metabolism Miracle Holiday Book. Da Capo Press. 2016.
