= Diabetic myonecrosis =

Death of muscle tissue due to diabetes

Diabetic myonecrosis is a complication of diabetes. It is caused by infarcted muscle tissue, usually in the thigh.

== Epidemiology ==
The mean age at presentation is thirty-seven years with a reported range of nineteen to sixty-four years. The mean age of onset since diagnosis of diabetes is fifteen years. The female:male ratio is 1.3:1. Other diabetic complications such as nephropathy, neuropathy, retinopathy and hypertension are usually present. Its major symptom is the acute onset muscle pain, usually in the thigh, in the absence of trauma. Signs include exquisite muscle tenderness and swelling.

== Investigations and diagnosis ==
Tissue biopsy is the gold standard. Macroscopically this reveals pale muscle tissue. Microscopically infarcted patches of myocytes. Necrotic muscle fibers are swollen and eosinophilic and lack striations and nuclei. Small-vessel walls are thickened and hyalinized, with luminal narrowing or complete occlusion. Biopsy cultures for bacteria, fungi, acid-fast bacilli and stains are negative in simple myonecrosis.

Creatine kinase may be normal or increased probably depending upon the stage of the condition when sampling is undertaken. ESR is elevated. Planar X-ray reveals soft tissue swelling and may potentially show gas within necrotic muscle, Bone scan may show non specific uptake later in the course. CT shows muscle oedema with preserved tissue planes (non-contrast enhancing). MRI is the exam of choice and shows increased signal on T2 weighted images within areas of muscle oedema. Contrast enhancement is helpful but must be weighed against the risk of Nephrogenic Systemic Fibrosis as many diabetics have underlying chronic kidney disease. Arteriography reveals large and medium vessel arteriosclerosis occasionally with dye within the area of tissue infarction. Electromyography shows non specific focal changes.

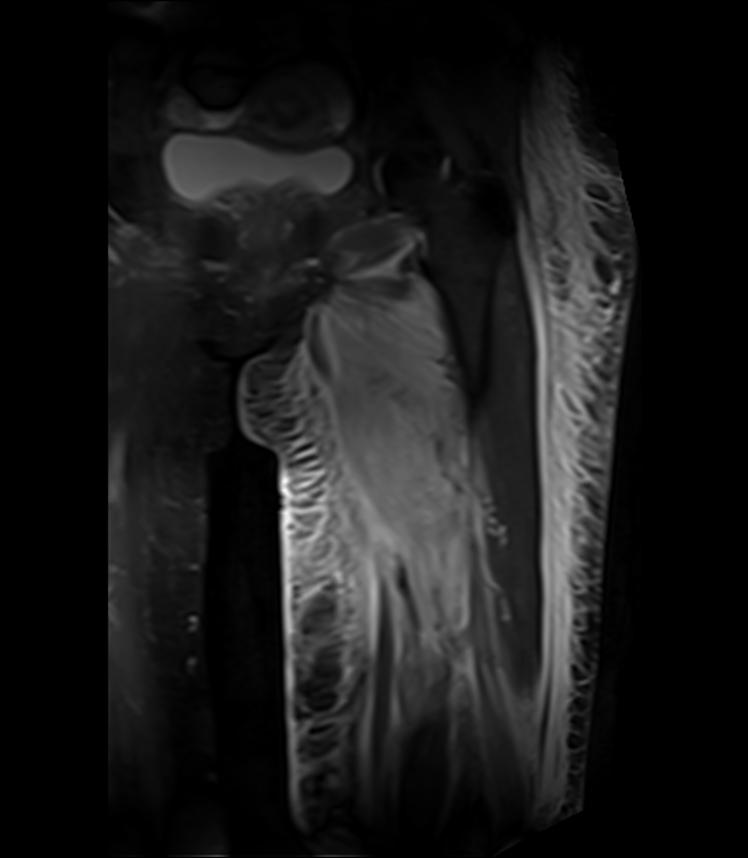
Coronal fat suppressed STIR image demonstrating enlargement and increased signal in the left adductor muscle group with associated subcutaneous edema in a patient with diabetic myonecrosis.

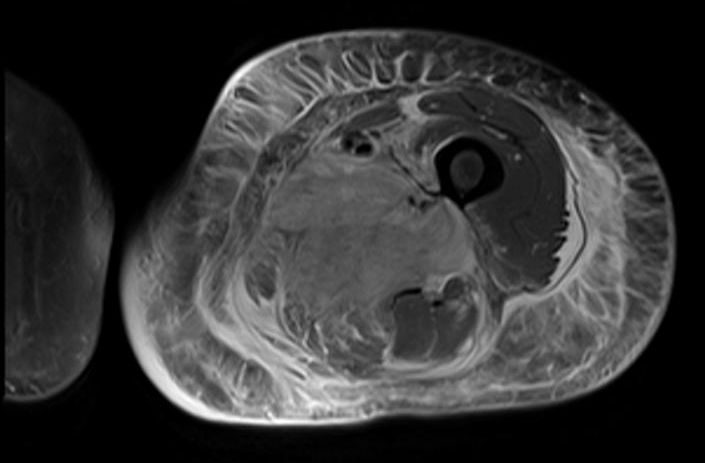
Axial fat suppressed T2 weighted MRI image showing hyperintense signal and enlargement of the left thigh adductor muscle group in diabetic myonecrosis.

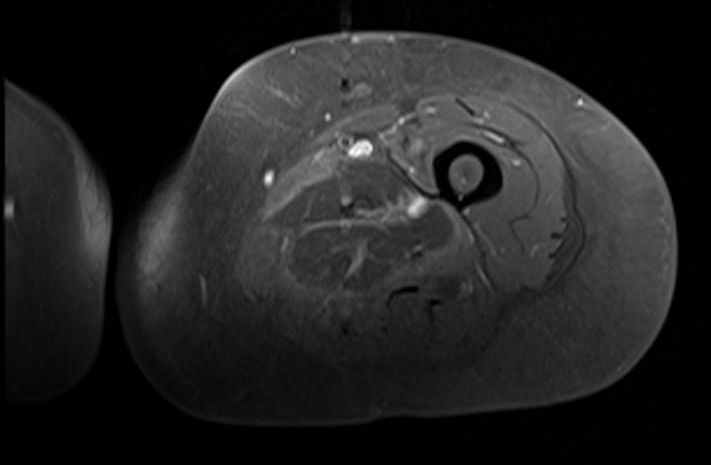
Axial fat suppressed post gadolinium contrast enhancement MRI image showing absent enhancement in the left thigh adductor muscles centrally indicating necrosis in diabetic myonecrosis.

== Treatment ==
Treatment includes supportive care with analgesics and anti-inflammatory agents. Exercise should be limited as it increases pain and extends the area of infarction. Symptoms usually resolve in weeks to months, but fifty percent of sufferers will experience relapse in either leg.

== Pathophysiology ==
The pathogenesis of this disease is unclear. Arteriosclerosis obliterans has been postulated as the cause, along with errors of the clotting and fibrinolytic pathways such as antiphospholipid syndrome.

== Differential diagnosis ==
A large number of conditions may cause symptoms and signs similar to diabetic myonecrosis and include: deep vein thrombosis, thrombophlebitis, cellulitis, fasciitis, abscess, haematoma, myositis, pseudothrombophlebitis (ruptured synovial cyst), pyomyositis, parasitic myositis, osteomyelitis, calcific myonecrosis, myositis ossificans, diabetic myotrophy, muscle strain or rupture, bursitis, vasculitis, arterial occlusion, haemangioma, lymphoedema, sarcoidosis, tuberculosis, cat-scratch disease, amyloidosis, as well as tumours of lipoma, chondroma, fibroma, leiomyoma, and sarcoma.
