= Pseudothrombophlebitis =

- Specialty: Phlebology

Pseudothrombophlebitis is a clinical condition where there are signs and symptoms of phlebitis in the absence of a thrombophlebitis lesion. Symptoms include pain, swelling, erythema and tenderness evolving over hours or days. It is often associated with the rupture or dissection of a popliteal cyst otherwise known as a Baker's cyst, although it can be associated with other disorders such as the arthritides. It may also occur as an orthopaedic surgical complication, secondary to trauma or as a presentation of septic arthritis. It is crucial to differentiate this condition from deep vein thrombosis as the treatment for DVT can cause adverse effects in patients with pseudothrombophlebitis.

== Presentation ==
The symptoms of pseudothrombophlebitis include pain, swelling, erythema and tenderness. It most commonly, but not exclusively, affects the legs. The presence of a popliteal cyst makes this diagnosis more likely. However, the presence of a popliteal cyst does not rule out deep vein thrombosis and warrants further investigation. Pseudothrombophlebitis and deep vein thrombosis are not mutually exclusive conditions, and in rare instances may co-occur.

Pseudothrombophlebitis is clinically indistinguishable from a true thrombophlebitis such as deep vein thrombosis; the symptoms and history are similar and these conditions cannot be distinguished by clinical examination without radiological or arthroscopic imaging.

It is crucial however to differentiate pseudothrombophlebitis from DVT as the thrombolytic and anticoagulant treatments usually administered in DVT are not effective in treating pseudothrombophlebitis, and may have adverse effects exacerbating the condition.

== Pathophysiology ==
Commonly, pseudothrombophlebitis is caused by rupture of a popliteal cyst causing leakage of synovial fluid, leading to inflammatory irritation to the gastrocnemius muscle.

Pseudothrombophlebitis is not the only possible consequence of a popliteal cyst. The existence of a large popliteal cyst can be a risk factor for deep vein thrombosis. Furthermore, a ruptured popliteal cyst may cause compartment syndrome in the calf or even the thigh.

== Diagnosis ==
Where pseudothrombophlebitis and thrombophlebitis present as differential diagnoses, DVT is excluded by the absence of a deep vein thrombosis, and the presence of a popliteal cyst is suggestive of pseudothrombophlebitis. The differentiation requires the use of radiological or arthroscopic imaging modalities.

In this condition, imaging modalities often indicated include the use of Doppler and non-Doppler ultrasound, arthrography, venography magnetic resonance imaging (MRI) and computerised axial tomography (CAT scan).

Ultrasound modalities in general are useful for the detection of a ruptured or dissecting popliteal cysts, while Doppler ultrasound has the additional benefit of detecting venous stenosis such as that caused by deep vein thrombosis.

Arthrography and venography using imaging dyes allow for the detection of popliteal cysts and the exclusion of thrombotic lesions but are invasive procedures.

Magnetic resonance imaging and computerised axial tomography scans allow for the detection of a ruptured or dissected popliteal cyst and, if in the same plane as the scan, the detection of a deep vein thrombosis.

== Treatment ==
Once diagnosed, and after deep vein thrombosis other disease masquerades have been excluded, the treatment for pseudothrombophlebitis is supportive. This includes the use of anti-inflammatory medications such as NSAIDs.
