= Ultralente insulin =

Long-acting form of insulin

Ultralente insulin was a long-acting form of insulin. It has an onset of 4 to 6 hours, a peak of 14 to 24 hours, and a duration of 28 to 36 hours. Due to its slow onset and long duration, daily shots were used to meet basal insulin needs.

Ultralente insulin, along with lente insulin, was discontinued in the US by manufacturers in the mid-2000s. One of the reasons for discontinuation was declining use in favor of NPH insulin and other newer insulin products. The FDA withdrew approval for ultralente insulin products by 2011.

== History ==
Insulin which was extracted from animal sources was used as a medicine as early as 1922. These early insulin preparations required multiple daily injections due to the short duration of action and quick degradation of the insulin protein. For this reason, researchers began studying how to prolong the effects of injected insulin. In 1952, a team at Novo Terapeutisk led by K. Hallas-Møller discovered that crystals of various sizes would form when zinc was added to insulin suspensions. Larger insulin crystals take longer to dissolve into the bloodstream when injected into the body, and as such have a much longer duration of action than amorphous or small insulin crystals. Ultralente insulin was considered to be a "long-acting" insulin that could be used once per day to provide a basal level of insulin, similar to some protamine-containing preparations.

While originally isolated from bovine or porcine sources, the advent of recombinant DNA technology in the 1980s allowed "human" insulin to be mass-produced in yeast or bacteria. By the mid-1990s, ultralente insulin was being prepared from recombinant human insulin, instead of insulin extracted from animals. The biggest supplier of human Ultralente was Eli Lilly, under the brand Humulin U.

Lente insulin was a combination of ultralente insulin and amorphous, or plain, insulin in a fixed percentage combination. Ultralente insulin comprises 65% of the lente insulin preparation Vetsulin®/Caninsulin® which is produced by Merck Animal Health for veterinary use.

The advent of insulin analogs and continued use of NPH insulin led to the discontinuation of ultralente insulin products in the mid-2000s, and FDA approval to be marketed in the US was withdrawn by 2011.

== Adverse effects ==
=== Hypoglycemia ===
The primary adverse effect of any insulin product is hypoglycemia, or low blood sugar. Hypoglycemia can manifest as dizziness, disorientation, trouble speaking, and changes in mental status. In severe cases, hypoglycemia can lead to loss of consciousness if not treated. As lente insulin continues to be absorbed in the body for hours after use, these signs and symptoms may be delayed from the time of administration and begin with little or no warning.

=== Hypersensitivity ===
Prior to the advent of the "human" lente insulins, the lente insulins (semi-lente, lente, and ultra-lente) were a combination of porcine and bovine insulin products that were filtered and combined with zinc to form the suspension. Even with product filtering, due to the animal origin, the human body might recognize the foreign protein as such and form antibodies against it. These reactions were slightly more likely with lente insulins than insulins derived from a solely porcine source, as bovine insulin was more immunogenic than porcine insulin.

== Society and culture ==
Historical brand names of ultralente insulin, all of which are now discontinued, included Ultratard HM, Humulin U, and Novolin U.
