= Angiopathy =

Disease of the blood vessels

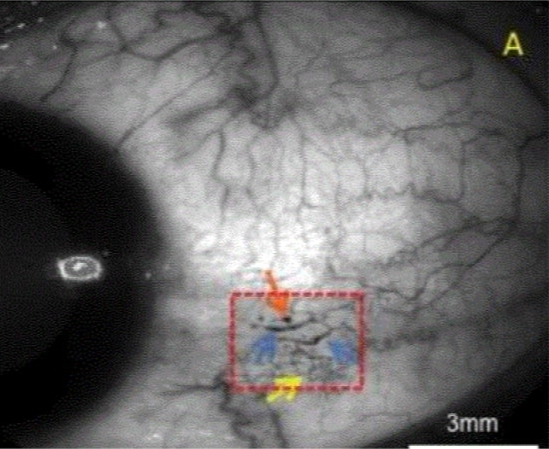
Conjunctival microangiopathy

Angiopathy is the generic term for a disease of the blood vessels (arteries, veins, and capillaries). This also refers to the condition of damage or rupture of small blood vessels. The best known and most prevalent angiopathy is diabetic angiopathy, a common complication of chronic diabetes.

== Classification ==
=== By caliber ===
There are two types of angiopathy: macroangiopathy and microangiopathy.

In macroangiopathy, atherosclerosis and a resultant blood clot forms on the large blood vessels, sticks to the vessel walls, and blocks the flow of blood. Macroangiopathy in the heart is coronary artery disease; in the brain, it is cerebrovascular disease. Macroangiopathy may cause other complications, such as ischemic heart disease, stroke and peripheral vascular disease which contributes to the diabetic foot ulcers and the risk of amputation.

In microangiopathy, the walls of the smaller blood vessels become so thick and weak that they bleed, leak protein, and slow the flow of blood through the body. The decrease of blood flow through stenosis or clot formation impairs the flow of oxygen to cells and biological tissues (called ischemia) and leads to cellular death (necrosis and gangrene, which in turn may require amputation). Thus, tissues which are very sensitive to oxygen levels, such as the retina, develop microangiopathy and may cause blindness (so-called proliferative diabetic retinopathy). Damage to nerve cells may cause peripheral neuropathy, and to kidney cells, diabetic kidney disease (Kimmelstiel-Wilson syndrome).

=== By condition ===
It is also possible to classify angiopathy by the associated condition:

- Diabetic angiopathy
- Cerebral amyloid angiopathy

Chronic diabetes can lead to several problems, one of which is Diabetic Angiopathy. Individuals with diabetic angiopathy notice a constriction in their arteries. This cause many organs to receive insufficient blood and oxygen, which might eventually cause harm. High blood sugar is the primary cause of diabetic angiopathy. Excessive blood sugar levels have the potential to harm tissues and cells.

A form of cerebrovascular illness known as Cerebral Amyloid Angiopathy (CAA) is typified by the buildup of amyloid beta-peptide in the leptomeninges and small to medium sized cerebral blood vessels. Amyloid buildup causes brittle blood vessels, which can lead to lobar intracerebral hemorrhages (ICH). In addition, hemosiderosis, inflammatory leukoencephalopathy, Alzheimer's disease, accidental microbleeds, cognitive deficits, and transitory neurological symptoms may manifest.

== Causes ==
The cause of Cerebral Amyloid Angiopathy are unknown. Sometimes it can be hereditary, however, there have been cases where it is developed in the elderly, especially in people over 55 years of age.

High blood sugar is the primary cause of diabetic angiopathy. The endothelium, a smooth layer of the cell wall, is weakened and the artery-lining cells are injured. Rough patches develop along the endothelium and may promote the accumulation of deposits known as plaque. These deposits gradually harden and become more noticeable over time, restricting (stenosing) the artery and impairing normal blood flow. Different organs receive insufficient oxygen-rich blood due to the bottleneck that was formed.

== Symptoms ==
Individuals with cerebral amyloid angiopathy typically have no symptoms. However, spontaneous lobar bleeding is the most frequent clinical sign when symptomatic. The clinical impairments are primarily determined by the site and extent of the bleeding. Larger hemorrhages may result in greater focused deficits, headaches, seizures, speaking difficulties, and muscular weakness. Smaller hemorrhages may produce hemiplegia and diminished consciousness.

== Treatment ==
Currently, while there is no cure for angiopathy, there are ways through which the symptoms can be managed. For example, therapies. Treatment options for situations of muscle weakness may include speech, occupational, or physical therapy. Medication can be used for potential seizures and memory loss.

lobar intracerebral hemorrhages(ICH) linked to CAA is often recurring. Due to this high prevalence, when there isn't a clear justification for anticoagulation, doctors usually avoid antiplatelet medicines and anticoagulants. Notably, research has shown that people with atrial fibrillation benefit from restarting anticoagulation.

Despite the fact that CAA does not appear to be primarily caused by hypertension, blood pressure reduction has also been linked to advantages in terms of mortality.[8] Blood pressure control reduced the risk of CAA-related ICH by 77%.

Finally, a small body of research has demonstrated the advantages of using immunosuppression to treat the inflammatory forms of CAA.
