= Certified diabetes educator =

A certified diabetes educator (CDE) is a health care professional who is specialized and certified to teach people with diabetes how to manage their condition.

The CDE is an asset for those who need to learn the tools and skills necessary to control their blood sugar and avoid long-term complications due to hyperglycemia. Unlike an endocrinologist, the CDE can spend as much time with a patient as is needed for education and emotional support. Types of education they can provide patients includes glycemic targets, teachings for using an insulin pen, blood glucometer, or continuous glucose monitoring machines, and the types of foods to eat and avoid.

Typically the CDE is also a nurse, dietitian, clinical nutrition professional, exercise physiologist, pharmacist, or social worker who has further specialized in diabetes education and care management. Formal education and years of practical experience are required, in addition to a formal examination, before a diabetes educator is certified.

CDEs can work independently for health clinics, medical practices, pharmacies, and for companies that provide diabetes education.

== Certification ==
In the US, certification is awarded by the National Certification Board for Diabetes Educators.

In Canada, certification is awarded by the Canadian Diabetes Educator Certification Board (CDECB).

In the Philippines, any allied health care professional may apply to be a diabetes educator after taking special courses from the Philippine Association of Diabetes Educators (PADE) or Association of Diabetes Nurse Educators of the Philippines (ADNEP). Qualified graduates of diabetes educator courses can practice as professional diabetes educators in any Center for Diabetes Care (CDC) clinic network. The Diabetes Nurse Educator (DNE) and Certified Lay Educator (CLE) are the equivalent of the CDE in the Philippines.
