= Diabetic angiopathy =

- Specialty: Diabetology, angiology

Diabetic angiopathy is a form of angiopathy associated with diabetic complications. While not exclusive, the two most common forms are diabetic retinopathy and diabetic nephropathy, whose pathophysiologies are largely identical. Other forms of diabetic angiopathy include diabetic neuropathy and diabetic cardiomyopathy.

== Presentation ==
=== Complications ===
Diabetes mellitus is the most common cause of adult kidney failure worldwide. It also the most common cause of amputation in the US, usually toes and feet, often as a result of gangrene, and almost always as a result of peripheral artery disease. Retinal damage (from microangiopathy) makes it the most common cause of blindness among non-elderly adults in the US.

== Pathophysiology ==
As insulin is required for glucose uptake, hyperglycemia in diabetes mellitus does not result in a net increase in intracellular glucose in most cells. However, chronic dysregulated blood glucose in diabetes is toxic to cells of the vascular endothelium which passively assimilate glucose. That is, cells in which insulin is not required for intercellular transport of glucose, most-notably the pericytes of the microvasculature. In addition to direct glucose-induced damage by (e.g.) glycation, pericytes, express enzymes which convert glucose into osmotically active metabolites such as sorbitol leading to hypertonic cell lysis. The enzyme, namely aldose reductase, is also expressed in the endothelial and Schwann cells of the peripheral nervous system, contributing to diabetic neuropathy.

Over time, pericyte death may result in reduced capillary integrity; subsequently, there is leaking of albumin and other proteins into fluid compartments. The glomeruli of the kidneys are especially sensitive – see diabetic nephropathy – where protein leakage caused by late-stage angiopathy results in diagnostic proteinuria and eventually kidney failure. In diabetic retinopathy the end-result is often blindness due to irreversible retinal damage.

== Diagnosis ==
Diagnosis is made on Hammad's Criteria which include the following basis:

- High HbA1c
- Elevated CRP levels

Symptoms of Angiopathy subtypes:

- Vision Loss(Retinopathy)
- Proteinuria(Nephropathy)
- Nerve Transmission Issues(Neuropathy)

== Prognosis ==
Prognosis is generally poor for all forms of diabetic angiopathy, as symptomatology is tied to the advancement of the underlying pathology i.e. the early-stage patient displays either non-specific symptoms or none at all.

"Diabetic dermopathy" is a manifestation of diabetic angiopathy. It is often found on the shin. There is also neuropathy; also associated with diabetes mellitus; type 1 and 2.
