= Desmond Castle =

Desmond Castle may refer to:

- Desmond Castle (Adare)
- Desmond Castle (Askeaton)
- Desmond Castle (Kinsale)
- Desmond Hall and Castle, Newcastle West
- any other castle built or belonging to the Earls of Desmond
