= Renal threshold =

In physiology, the renal threshold is the concentration of a substance dissolved in the blood above which the kidneys begin to remove it into the urine. When the renal threshold of a substance is exceeded, reabsorption of the substance by the proximal convoluted tubule is incomplete; consequently, part of the substance remains in the urine. Renal thresholds vary by substance – the low potency poison urea, for instance, is removed at much lower concentrations than glucose. Indeed, the most common reason for the glucose renal threshold ever being exceeded is diabetes, which is called glycosuria.

Renal thresholds vary by species and by physiological condition; thus an animal may have different renal thresholds while hibernating. Renal thresholds can also be altered by many drugs, and may change in characteristic ways during certain illnesses. If the renal threshold itself is reduced, can also produce detectable glucose in the urine. This is called renal glycosuria.

Taken together, the collection of a kidney's renal thresholds essentially define much of its function in renal physiology. Many tests of kidney function amount to measures of renal thresholds for various substances.
