= DESMOND (diabetes) =

UK NHS training course

DESMOND (Diabetes Education and Self Management for Ongoing and Newly Diagnosed) is a UK NHS training course for people with type 2 diabetes that helps people to identify their own health risks and to set their own goals.

== Background ==
DESMOND is the first national education programme created for people with Type 2 diabetes. DESMOND meets the criteria NICE identified as being the characteristics of a quality, evidence-based structured education programme.

A NHS training course is available for type 1 diabetics called DAFNE (Dose Adjustment for Normal Eating).

== Course details ==
=== Format ===
Each programme is run in a group setting, consisting of not more than 10 people newly diagnosed with Type 2 diabetes (normally within the last 12 months), accompanied, if they so choose, by a partner, family member, or friend. The programme may be run as a one-day, or two part (2 x half-day) course.

The DESMOND programme is facilitated by two health care professionals who have been formally trained.

=== Content ===
Topics covered in the DESMOND curriculum:

1. The patient story
2. What diabetes is
3. Main ways to manage diabetes
4. Consequences of diabetes and personal risk from having diabetes
5. Monitoring your diabetes
6. Ways to take action to improve the control of your diabetes
7. Food choices for diabetics
8. Physical activity and diabetes
9. Stress and emotions and diabetes
10. The purpose and content of annual diabetic review and screening in diabetics

== See also ==
- Type 2 diabetes
