= Macrovascular disease =

- Specialty: Vascular medicine

Macrovascular disease (also known as macroangiopathy) is a disease of any large (macro) blood vessels in the body. It is a disease of the large blood vessels, including the coronary arteries, the aorta, and the sizable arteries in the brain and in the limbs.

This sometimes occurs when a person has had diabetes for an extended period of time. Fat and blood clots build up in the large blood vessels and stick to the vessel walls.

Three common macrovascular diseases are coronary disease (in the heart), cerebrovascular disease (in the brain), and peripheral vascular disease (in the limbs)

Macrovascular disease (macroangiopathy) refers to atherosclerosis. Atherosclerosis is a form of arteriosclerosis (thickening and hardening of arterial walls), characterized by plaque deposits of lipids, fibrous connective tissue, calcium, and other blood substances. Atherosclerosis, by definition, affects only medium and large arteries (excluding arterioles).

Macrovascular disease is associated with the development of coronary artery disease, peripheral vascular disease, brain attack (stroke), and increased risk of infection. Type 2 diabetes is more closely associated with macrovascular diseases than type 1 diabetes. Peripheral vascular disease and increased risk of infection have important implications in the care of the acutely ill patient.
