= Albert F. Bennett =

American zoologist

Albert Farrell Bennett
- Born: California
- Occupations: Zoologist, physiologist, evolutionary biologist, author, and academic

Academic background
- Education: A.B., Zoology; Ph.D., Zoology
- Alma mater: University of California, Riverside; University of Michigan
- Thesis: Oxygen transport and energy metabolism in two species of lizards, Sauromalus hispidus and Varanus gouldii (1971)

Albert Farrell Bennett is an American zoologist, physiologist, evolutionary biologist, author, and academic. He is Dean Emeritus of the School of Biological Sciences at University of California, Irvine.

Bennett's research focuses on exploring the interaction between living systems and their environment, specifically focusing on temperature and energy exchange. He is a co-author of several books, including New Directions in Ecological Physiology and Animals and Temperature: Phenotypic and Evolutionary Adaptation. He is an Elected Fellow of the American Academy of Arts and Sciences and the American Association for the Advancement of Science, and serves on the board of directors for environmental and educational organizations, including the Crystal Cove Conservancy, the Irvine Ranch Conservancy, Pangea World, and the Center for International Experiential Learning.

== Education ==
In 1966, he earned an A.B. in Zoology from the University of California, Riverside. He later obtained a Ph.D. in zoology from the University of Michigan in 1971, followed by a Miller Postdoctoral Fellowship at the University of California, Berkeley from 1971 to 1973.

== Career ==
Bennett began his career in academia as an Acting Assistant Professor in the Department of Zoology at UC Berkeley in 1973. Afterwards, he joined the faculty at University of California (UC) Irvine in 1974, initially as an assistant professor in the Departments of Developmental and Cell Biology, and Ecology and Evolutionary Biology, before becoming associate professor in 1978. He was appointed as a professor in 1983 and served in that capacity until his retirement in 2013.

Bennett served as Chair of the Department of Developmental and Cell Biology in 1984-86 and 1988–89, Acting Dean in 1986-88 and 2006–07, and held an appointment as the Inaugural Hana and Francisco J. Ayala Dean at School of Biological Sciences from 2007 to 2013. In addition, he was appointed as the Chair of the Department of Ecology and Evolutionary Biology from 1998 to 2006, and as Vice Provost for Academic Initiatives from 2013 to 2016. He holds the position of Dean Emeritus in the School of Biological Sciences. He held research appointments at University of Chicago, Michigan State University, University of Nairobi, University of Western Australia, University of Adelaide, and the Smithsonian Tropical Research Institute in Panama.

== Research ==
Bennett is most known for his contributions to the fields of evolutionary and comparative physiology, and has been honored with several awards, including being named a Hansen Distinguished Lecturer by the University of California, Berkeley and an August Krogh Distinguished Lecturer by the American Physiological Society.

=== Evolutionary and comparative physiology ===
Bennett's research focuses on how temperature affects rate processes in various organisms, including metabolism, locomotion, growth, and reproduction, and examines the factors that limit these processes, such as energy intake and its allocation to maintenance, thermoregulation, synthesis, and activity. Much of his early research included comparative and experimental studies on reptiles to understand the evolution of endothermy in mammals and birds, including the physiological and morphological alterations involved and the selective factors that promoted its development. His work also explored the adaptive patterns in behavior and energy allocation of ectothermic vertebrates, particularly reptiles, which have limited oxygen uptake and rely on anaerobic metabolism for intense activity. In a highly cited 1979 joint research work with J. Ruben, he compared aerobic metabolism between endothermic and ectothermic vertebrates, highlighting the importance of aerobic metabolism in the former. This study suggested that the evolution of endothermy was driven by the need to increase aerobic capacities for sustained activity and not just for thermoregulation alone. In other studies, he also evaluated the thermal dependence of locomotor capacity in ectothermic vertebrates and found that low temperature greatly constrains performance. He argued for the need for a comprehensive concept of thermal adaptation that considers all levels of biological organization, from molecules to whole organisms, and their connections to fitness and ecological success.

Bennett's research has a focus on metabolism that explores various organizational levels, including enzymatic, organismal, and ecological aspects. In this regard, he compared and contrasted the physiology of lower vertebrates (such as reptiles, amphibians, and fish) with mammals and birds during activity, particularly exploring oxygen consumption, anaerobic metabolism, and body temperature effects. Through his research studies, he found that an organism's metabolic design and capacities play a significant role in determining the types and levels of feasible behavior, allowing behavior only within those constraints. In another study, he measured the metabolic rates of western fence lizards in both laboratory and field settings. This research stressed upon the importance of considering activity levels when measuring metabolic rates and comparing them to those of birds and mammals.

In conjunction with Raymond B. Huey and Theodore Garland Jr., Bennett's research highlighted the importance of using phylogenetic information in comparative studies, introduced three methods and provided examples, while addressing potential difficulties and emphasizing the importance of evolutionary history. Their research adopted an ecological and evolutionary framework developed to examine how organisms adapt to natural environmental variations and to analyze organismal adjustments to heat stress.

=== Experimental evolution ===
Bennett outlined four general approaches to the study of evolutionary physiology and demonstrated the value of selection experiments in testing hypotheses about functional character evolution. Maintaining that experimental evolution is a valuable tool to test evolutionary hypotheses and determine adaptive responses to new environments, he, in collaboration with R. Lenski and other researchers, examined the patterns of evolutionary change in bacterial populations exposed to different thermal and acidic conditions to investigate evolutionary dynamics in diverse environments. They studied the number and diversity of beneficial mutations by subjecting 115 Escherichia coli populations to 2000 generations of evolution at high temperature. The experiment resulted in the identification of 1331 mutations affecting 600 sites, revealing the presence of epistasis among beneficial mutations that shape adaptive trajectories. Through two additional bacterial experiments, they assessed the impact of adaptation, chance, and history on the evolution of fitness and cell size, and found that populations achieved similar fitness regardless of history or chance, while the evolution of cell size was influenced by both history and chance. They additionally tested the evolutionary hypothesis of trade-off, the necessary loss of fitness in other environments during adaptation to a new one. Twenty-four bacterial populations were adapted to low temperature and correlated fitness change at high temperature was determined. Loss of fitness was observed in 15 populations, but not in the other 9. Consequently, trade-offs were generally, but not universally observed.

== Awards and honors ==
- 1981 – Elected Fellow, American Association for the Advancement of Science
- 1988-91 – Elected Chair, Comparative Physiology Section, American Physiological Society
- 1990 – Elected President, American Society of Zoologists
- 1994 – Elected Fellow, American Academy of Arts and Sciences
- 2002 – August Krogh Distinguished Lecturer, American Physiological Society

== Bibliography ==
=== Books ===
- New Directions in Ecological Physiology (1987) ISBN 9780521496582
- Animals and Temperature: Phenotypic and Evolutionary Adaptation (1996) ISBN 978-0521496582

=== Selected articles ===
- Bennett, A. F., & Ruben, J. A. (1979). Endothermy and activity in vertebrates. Science, 206(4419), 649-654
- Huey, R. B., & Bennett, A. F. (1987). Phylogenetic studies of coadaptation: preferred temperatures versus optimal performance temperatures of lizards. Evolution, 41(5), 1098–1115.
- Travisano, M., Mongold, J. A., Bennett, A. F., & Lenski, R. E. (1995). Experimental tests of the roles of adaptation, chance, and history in evolution. Science, 267(5194), 87–90.
- Garland Jr, T., Bennett, A. F., & Rezende, E. L. (2005). Phylogenetic approaches in comparative physiology. Journal of experimental Biology, 208(16), 3015–3035.
- Bennett, A. F., and Lenski, R. E. (2007). An experimental test of evolutionary trade-offs during temperature adaptation. Proceedings of the National Academy of Sciences, 104, 8649-8654
- Tenaillon, O., Rodríguez-Verdugo, A., Gaut, R. L., McDonald, P., Bennett, A. F., Long, A. D., & Gaut, B. S. (2012). The molecular diversity of adaptive convergence. Science, 335(6067), 457–461.
