= Organismal performance =

Organismal performance (or whole-organism performance) refers to the ability of an organism to conduct a task when maximally motivated. Various aspects of performance are of primary concern in human athletics, horse racing, and dog racing. Performance in swimming tasks has been a subject of fisheries research since the 1960s. In a broader biological context, the term first came to prominence with studies of locomotor abilities in lizards and snakes in the late 1970s and early 1980s.

== Paradigm ==
A seminal paper by Stevan J. Arnold in 1983 focused on the importance of performance as an intermediary between lower-level traits and how natural selection acts. In particular, selection should act more directly on performance than on the subordinate traits (e.g., aspects of morphology, physiology, neurobiology) that determine performance abilities. In other words, how fast a lizard can run is more important in escaping from predators than are the lengths of its legs, because they only party determine its ability to run fast. Since then, others have pointed out that behavior often acts as a "filter" between selection and performance because animals do not always behave in ways that use their maximal performance abilities. For example, if a lizard that saw a predator approaching did not choose to run, then its ability to sprint would be irrelevant. In any case, the original version of the conceptual model has stimulated much research in integrative organismal biology. However, contrary to the hypothesis that selection should be stronger on whole-organism functional performance traits (such as sprinting ability) than on correlated morphological traits, a review of empirical studies did not find evidence that selection measured in the wild was stronger on performance.

== In plants ==
Although organismal performance is more commonly studied in animals (including human beings) than in plants, various studies have focused on whole-plant performance in a similar vein. For example, suction feeding abilities have been measured in carnivorous plants (bladderworts). Although plants do not have either a nervous system or muscles, they can be said to have behavior. How such "behavior" may serve as a filter between performance and selection apparently has not been studied.

== See also ==
- Athletics (physical culture)
- Comparative physiology
- Duncan Irschick
- Ecophysiology
- Evolutionary physiology
- Raymond B. Huey
- Theodore Garland, Jr.
