= Physiology of dinosaurs =

The physiology of non-avian dinosaurs has historically been a controversial subject, particularly their thermoregulation. Recently, many new lines of evidence have been brought to bear on dinosaur physiology generally, including not only metabolic systems and thermoregulation, but on respiratory and cardiovascular systems as well.

During the early years of dinosaur paleontology, it was widely considered that they were sluggish, cumbersome, and sprawling cold-blooded lizards. However, with the discovery of much more complete skeletons in the western United States, starting in the 1870s, scientists made more informed interpretations of dinosaur biology and physiology. Edward Drinker Cope, opponent of Othniel Charles Marsh in the Bone Wars, propounded at least some dinosaurs as active and agile, as seen in the painting of two fighting Laelaps produced under his direction by Charles R. Knight.

In parallel, the development of Darwinian evolution, and the discoveries of Archaeopteryx and Compsognathus, led Thomas Henry Huxley to propose that dinosaurs were closely related to birds. Despite these considerations, the image of dinosaurs as large reptiles had already taken root, and most aspects of their paleobiology were interpreted as being typically reptilian for the first half of the twentieth century. Beginning in the 1960s and with the advent of the dinosaur renaissance, views of dinosaurs and their physiology have changed dramatically, including the discovery of feathered dinosaurs in Early Cretaceous age deposits in China, indicating that birds evolved from highly agile maniraptoran dinosaurs.

== History ==
=== Early interpretations ===
Reconstruction of Megalosaurus from 1854, in Crystal Palace, London

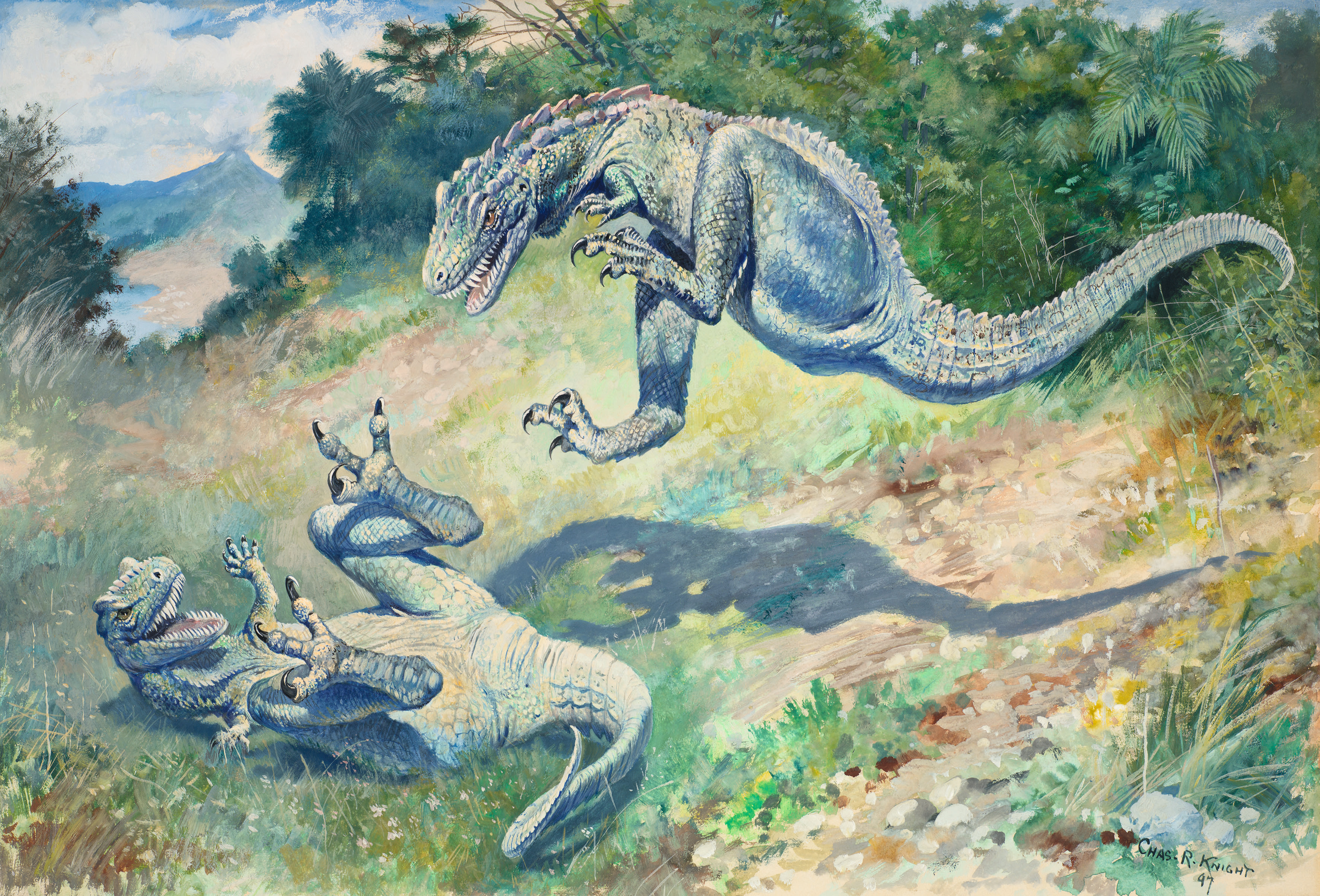
The 1897 painting of "Laelaps" (now Dryptosaurus) by Charles R. Knight

The study of dinosaurs began in the 1820s in England. Pioneers in the field, such as William Buckland, Gideon Mantell, and Richard Owen, interpreted the first, very fragmentary remains as belonging to large quadrupedal beasts. Their early work can be seen today in the Crystal Palace Dinosaurs, constructed in the 1850s, which present known dinosaurs as elephantine lizard-like reptiles. Despite these reptilian appearances, Owen speculated that dinosaur heart and respiratory systems were more similar to that of a mammal than a reptile.

=== Changing views and the dinosaur renaissance ===
In the late 1960s, similar ideas reappeared, beginning with John Ostrom's work on Deinonychus and bird evolution. His student, Bob Bakker, popularized the changing thought in a series of papers beginning with The superiority of dinosaurs in 1968. In these publications, he argued strenuously that dinosaurs were warm-blooded and active animals, capable of sustained periods of high activity. In most of his writings Bakker framed his arguments as new evidence leading to a revival of ideas popular in the late 19th century, frequently referring to an ongoing dinosaur renaissance. He used a variety of anatomical and statistical arguments to defend his case, the methodology of which was fiercely debated among scientists.

These debates sparked interest in new methods for ascertaining the palaeobiology of extinct animals, such as bone histology, which have been successfully applied to determining the growth-rates of many dinosaurs.

Today, it is generally thought that many or perhaps all dinosaurs had higher metabolic rates than living reptiles, but also that the situation is more complex and varied than Bakker originally proposed. For example, while smaller dinosaurs may have been true endotherms, the larger forms could have been inertial homeotherms, or that many dinosaurs could have had intermediate metabolic rates.

== Feeding and digestion ==
The earliest dinosaurs were almost certainly predators, and shared several predatory features with their nearest non-dinosaur relatives like Lagosuchus, including: relatively large, curved, blade-like teeth in large, wide-opening jaws that closed like scissors; relatively small abdomens, as carnivores do not require large digestive systems. Later dinosaurs regarded as predators sometimes grew much larger, but retained the same set of features. Instead of chewing their food, these predators swallowed it whole.

The feeding habits of ornithomimosaurs and oviraptorosaurs are a mystery: although they evolved from a predatory theropod lineage, they have small jaws and lack the blade-like teeth of typical predators, but there is no evidence of their diet or how they ate and digested it.

Features of other groups of dinosaurs indicate they were herbivores. These features include:

- Jaws that only slightly opened and closed so that all the teeth met at the same time
- Large abdomens that could accommodate large amounts of vegetation and store it for the long time it takes to digest vegetation
- Guts that likely contained endosymbiotic micro-organisms that digest cellulose, as no known animal can digest this tough material directly

Sauropods, which were herbivores, did not chew their food, as their teeth and jaws appear suitable only for stripping leaves off plants. Ornithischians, also herbivores, show a variety of approaches. The armored ankylosaurs and stegosaurs had small heads and weak jaws and teeth, and are thought to have fed in much the same way as sauropods. The pachycephalosaurs had small heads and weak jaws and teeth, but their lack of large digestive systems suggests a different diet, possibly fruits, seeds, or young shoots, which would have been more nutritious to them than leaves.

On the other hand, ornithopods such as Hypsilophodon, Iguanodon and various hadrosaurs had horny beaks for snipping off vegetation and jaws and teeth that were well-adapted for chewing. The horned ceratopsians had similar mechanisms.

It has often been suggested that at least some non-avian dinosaurs used swallowed stones, known as gastroliths, to aid digestion by grinding their food in muscular gizzards, and that this was a feature they shared with avian dinosaurs (birds). In 2007 Oliver Wings reviewed references to gastroliths in scientific literature and found considerable confusion, starting with the lack of an agreed and objective definition of "gastrolith". He found that swallowed hard stones or grit can assist digestion in birds that mainly feed on grain but may not be essential—and that birds that eat insects in summer and grain in winter usually get rid of the stones and grit in summer. Gastroliths have often been described as important for sauropod dinosaurs, whose diet of vegetation required very thorough digestion, but Wings concluded that this idea was incorrect: gastroliths are found with only a small percentage of sauropod fossils; where they have been found, the amounts are too small and in many cases the stones are too soft to have been effective in grinding food; most of these gastroliths are highly polished, but gastroliths used by modern animals to grind food are roughened by wear and corroded by stomach acids; hence the sauropod gastroliths were probably swallowed accidentally. On the other hand, he concluded that gastroliths found with fossils of advanced theropod dinosaurs such as Sinornithomimus and Caudipteryx resemble those of birds, and that the use of gastroliths for grinding food may have appeared early in the group of dinosaurs from which these dinosaurs and birds both evolved.

== Reproductive biology ==
When laying eggs, female birds grow a special type of bone in their limbs between the hard outer bone and the marrow. This medullary bone, which is rich in calcium, is used to make eggshells, and the birds that produced it absorb it when they have finished laying eggs. Medullary bone has been found in fossils of the theropods Tyrannosaurus and Allosaurus and of the ornithopod Tenontosaurus.

Because the line of dinosaurs that includes Allosaurus and Tyrannosaurus diverged from the line that led to Tenontosaurus very early in the evolution of dinosaurs, the presence of medullary bone in both groups suggests that dinosaurs in general produced medullary tissue. On the other hand, crocodilians, which are dinosaurs' second closest extant relatives after birds, do not produce medullary bone. This tissue may have first appeared in ornithodires, the Triassic archosaur group from which dinosaurs are thought to have evolved.

Medullary bone has been found in specimens of sub-adult size, which suggests that dinosaurs reached sexual maturity before they were full-grown. Sexual maturity at sub-adult size is also found in reptiles and in medium- to large-sized mammals, but birds and small mammals reach sexual maturity only after they are full-grown—which happens within their first year. Early sexual maturity is also associated with specific features of animals' life cycles: the young are born relatively well-developed rather than helpless; and the death-rate among adults is high.

== Respiratory system ==
=== Air sacs ===
Birds' lungs obtain fresh air during both exhalation and inhalation, because the air sacs do all the "pumping" and the lungs simply absorb oxygen.

From about 1870 onwards scientists have generally agreed that the post-cranial skeletons of many dinosaurs contained many air-filled cavities (postcranial skeletal pneumaticity), especially in the vertebrae. Pneumatization of the skull (such as paranasal sinuses) is found in both synapsids and archosaurs, but postcranial pneumatization is found only in birds, non-avian saurischian dinosaurs, and pterosaurs.

For a long time these cavities were regarded simply as weight-saving devices, but Bakker proposed that they were connected to air sacs like those that make birds' respiratory systems the most efficient of all animals'.

John Ruben et al. (1997, 1999, 2003, 2004) disputed this and suggested that dinosaurs had a "tidal" respiratory system (in and out) powered by a crocodile-like hepatic piston mechanism – muscles attached mainly to the pubis pull the liver backwards, which makes the lungs expand to inhale; when these muscles relax, the lungs return to their previous size and shape, and the animal exhales. They also presented this as a reason for doubting that birds descended from dinosaurs.

Critics have claimed that, without avian air sacs, modest improvements in a few aspects of a modern reptile's circulatory and respiratory systems would enable the reptile to achieve 50% to 70% of the oxygen flow of a mammal of similar size, and that lack of avian air sacs would not prevent the development of endothermy. Very few formal rebuttals have been published in scientific journals of Ruben et al.'s claim that dinosaurs could not have had avian-style air sacs; but one points out that the Sinosauropteryx fossil on which they based much of their argument was severely flattened and therefore it was impossible to tell whether the liver was the right shape to act as part of a hepatic piston mechanism. Some recent papers simply note without further comment that Ruben et al. argued against the presence of air sacs in dinosaurs.

Researchers have presented evidence and arguments for air sacs in sauropods, "prosauropods", coelurosaurs, ceratosaurs, and the theropods Aerosteon and Coelophysis.

In advanced sauropods ("neosauropods") the vertebrae of the lower back and hip regions show signs of air sacs. In early sauropods only the cervical (neck) vertebrae show these features. If the developmental sequence found in bird embryos is a guide, air sacs actually evolved before the channels in the skeleton that accommodate them in later forms.

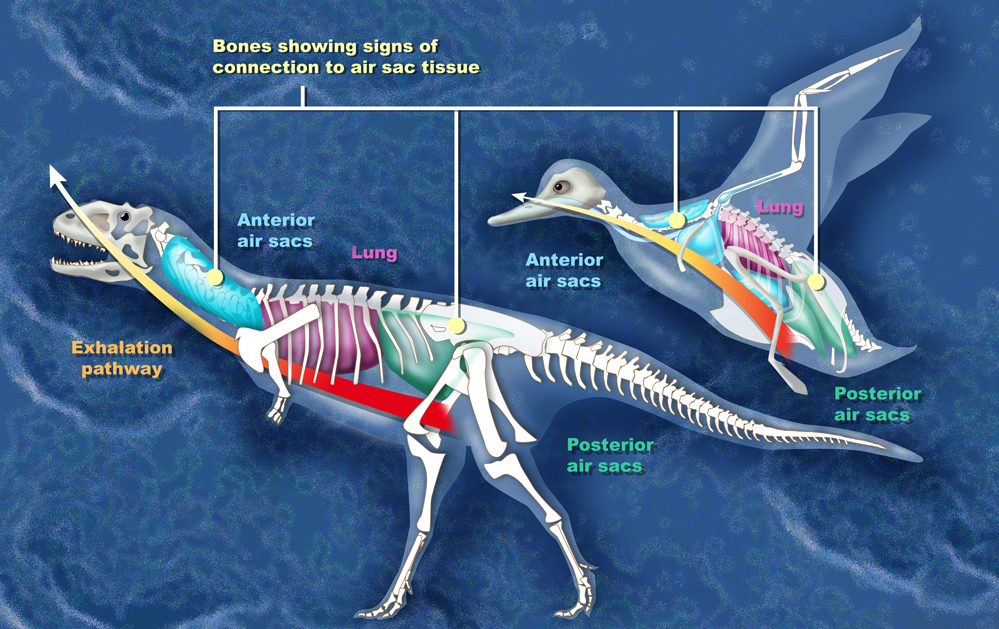
Comparison between the air sacs of Majungasaurus and a bird

Evidence of air sacs has also been found in theropods. Studies indicate that fossils of coelurosaurs, ceratosaurs, and the theropods Coelophysis and Aerosteon exhibit evidence of air sacs. Coelophysis, from the late Triassic, is one of the earliest dinosaurs whose fossils show evidence of channels for air sacs. Aerosteon, a Late Cretaceous allosaur, had the most bird-like air sacs found so far.

Early sauropodomorphs, including the group traditionally called "prosauropods", may also have had air sacs. Although possible pneumatic indentations have been found in Plateosaurus and Thecodontosaurus, the indentations are very small. One study in 2007 concluded that prosauropods likely had abdominal and cervical air sacs, based on the evidence for them in sister taxa (theropods and sauropods). The study concluded that it was impossible to determine whether prosauropods had a bird-like flow-through lung, but that the air sacs were almost certainly present. A further indication for the presence of air sacs and their use in lung ventilation comes from a reconstruction of the air exchange volume (the volume of air exchanged with each breath) of Plateosaurus, which when expressed as a ratio of air volume per body weight at 29 ml/kg is similar to values of geese and other birds, and much higher than typical mammalian values.

So far no evidence of air sacs has been found in ornithischian dinosaurs. But this does not imply that ornithischians could not have had metabolic rates comparable to those of mammals, since mammals also do not have air sacs.

Three explanations have been suggested for the development of air sacs in dinosaurs:

- Increase in respiratory capacity. This is probably the most common hypothesis, and fits well with the idea that many dinosaurs had fairly high metabolic rates.
- Improving balance and maneuvrability by lowering the center of gravity and reducing rotational inertia. However this does not explain the expansion of air sacs in the quadrupedal sauropods.
- As a cooling mechanism. It seems that air sacs and feathers evolved at about the same time in coelurosaurs. If feathers retained heat, their owners would have required a means of dissipating excess heat. This idea is plausible but needs further empirical support.

Calculations of the volumes of various parts of the sauropod Apatosaurus' respiratory system support the evidence of bird-like air sacs in sauropods:

- Assuming that Apatosaurus, like dinosaurs' nearest surviving relatives crocodilians and birds, did not have a diaphragm, the dead-space volume of a 30-ton specimen would be about 184 liters. This is the total volume of the mouth, trachea and air tubes. If the animal exhales less than this, stale air is not expelled and is sucked back into the lungs on the following inhalation.
- Estimates of its tidal volume – the amount of air moved into or out of the lungs in a single breath – depend on the type of respiratory system the animal had: 904 liters if avian; 225 liters if mammalian; 19 liters if reptilian.

On this basis, Apatosaurus could not have had a reptilian respiratory system, as its tidal volume would have been less than its dead-space volume, so that stale air was not expelled but was sucked back into the lungs. Likewise, a mammalian system would only provide to the lungs about 225 − 184 = 41 liters of fresh, oxygenated air on each breath. Apatosaurus must therefore have had either a system unknown in the modern world or one like birds', with multiple air sacs and a flow-through lung. Furthermore, an avian system would only need a lung volume of about 600 liters while a mammalian one would have required about 2,950 liters, which would exceed the estimated 1,700 liters of space available in a 30-ton Apatosaurus′ chest.

Dinosaur respiratory systems with bird-like air sacs may have been capable of sustaining higher activity levels than mammals of similar size and build can sustain. In addition to providing a very efficient supply of oxygen, the rapid airflow would have been an effective cooling mechanism, which is essential for animals that are active but too large to get rid of all the excess heat through their skins.

The palaeontologist Peter Ward has argued that the evolution of the air sac system, which first appears in the very earliest dinosaurs, may have been in response to the very low (11%) atmospheric oxygen of the Carnian and Norian ages of the Triassic Period.

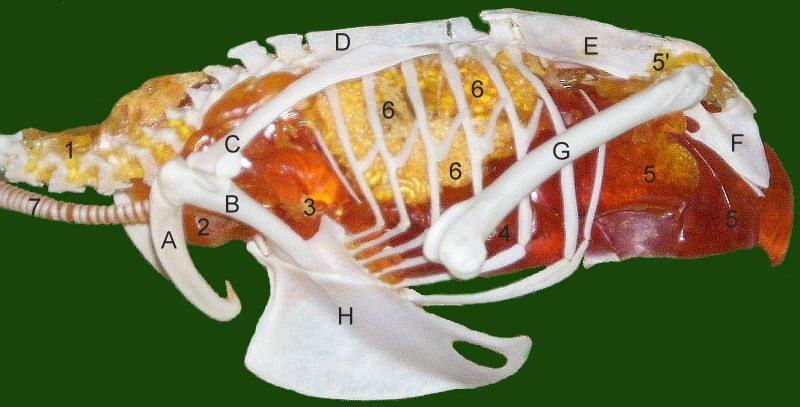
The uncinate processes are the small white spurs about halfway along the ribs. The rest of this diagram shows the air sacs and other parts of a bird's respiratory system:1 cervical air sac, 2 clavicular air sac, 3 cranial thoracal air sac, 4 caudal thoracal air sac, 5 abdominal air sac (5' diverticulus into pelvic girdle), 6 lung, 7 trachea

=== Uncinate processes on the ribs ===
Birds have spurs called "uncinate processes" on the rear edges of their ribs, and these give the chest muscles more leverage when pumping the chest to improve oxygen supply. The size of the uncinate processes is related to the bird's lifestyle and oxygen requirements: they are shortest in walking birds and longest in diving birds, which need to replenish their oxygen reserves quickly when they surface. Non-avian maniraptoran dinosaurs also had these uncinate processes, and they were proportionately as long as in modern diving birds, which indicates that maniraptorans needed a high-capacity oxygen supply.

Plates that may have functioned the same way as uncinate processes have been observed in fossils of the ornithischian dinosaur Thescelosaurus, and have been interpreted as evidence of high oxygen consumption and therefore high metabolic rate.

=== Nasal turbinates ===
Nasal turbinates are convoluted structures of thin bone in the nasal cavity. In most mammals and birds these are present and lined with mucous membranes that perform two functions. They improve the sense of smell by increasing the area available to absorb airborne chemicals, and they warm and moisten inhaled air, and extract heat and moisture from exhaled air to prevent desiccation of the lungs.

John Ruben and others have argued that no evidence of nasal turbinates has been found in dinosaurs. All the dinosaurs they examined had nasal passages that were too narrow and short to accommodate nasal turbinates, so dinosaurs could not have sustained the breathing rate required for a mammal-like or bird-like metabolic rate while at rest, because their lungs would have dried out. However, objections have been raised against this argument. Nasal turbinates are absent or very small in some birds (e.g. ratites, Procellariiformes and Falconiformes) and mammals (e.g. whales, anteaters, bats, elephants, and most primates), although these animals are fully endothermic and in some cases very active. Other studies conclude that nasal turbinates are fragile and seldom found in fossils. In particular none have been found in fossil birds.

In 2014 Jason Bourke and others in Anatomical Record reported finding nasal turbinates in pachycephalosaurs.

== Cardiovascular system ==
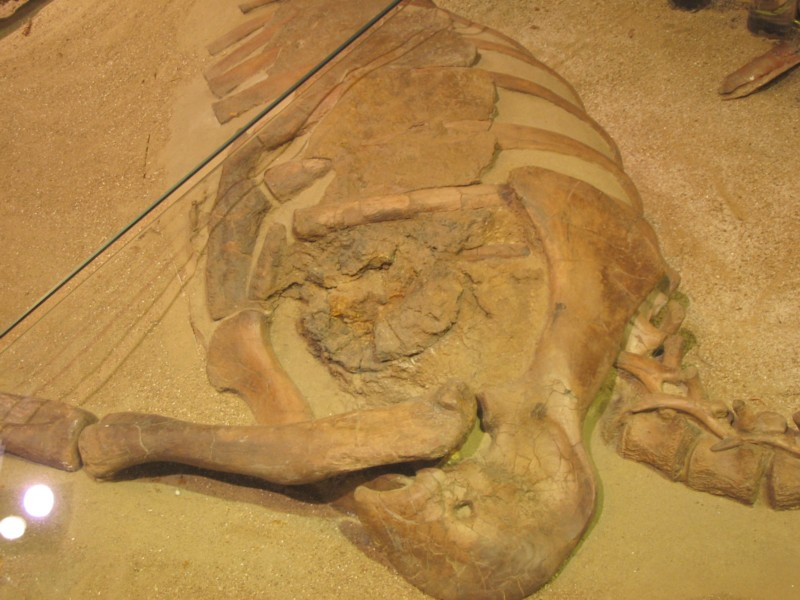
The possible heart of "Willo" the thescelosaur (center).

In principle one would expect dinosaurs to have had two-part circulations driven by four-chambered hearts, since many would have needed high blood pressure to deliver blood to their heads, which were high off the ground, but vertebrate lungs can only tolerate fairly low blood pressure. In 2000, a skeleton of Thescelosaurus, now on display at the North Carolina Museum of Natural Sciences, was described as including the remnants of a four-chambered heart and an aorta. The authors interpreted the structure of the heart as indicating an elevated metabolic rate for Thescelosaurus, not reptilian cold-bloodedness. Their conclusions have been disputed; other researchers published a paper where they assert that the heart is really a concretion of entirely mineral "cement". As they note: the anatomy given for the object is incorrect, for example the alleged "aorta" is narrowest where it meets the "heart" and lacks arteries branching from it; the "heart" partially engulfs one of the ribs and has an internal structure of concentric layers in some places; and another concretion is preserved behind the right leg. The original authors defended their position; they agreed that the chest did contain a type of concretion, but one that had formed around and partially preserved the more muscular portions of the heart and aorta.

Regardless of the object's identity, it may have little relevance to dinosaurs' internal anatomy and metabolic rate. Both modern crocodilians and birds, the closest living relatives of dinosaurs, have four-chambered hearts, although modified in crocodilians, and so dinosaurs probably had them as well. However such hearts are not necessarily tied to metabolic rate.

== Growth and lifecycle ==
No dinosaur egg has been found that is larger than a basketball and embryos of large dinosaurs have been found in relatively small eggs, e.g. Maiasaura. Like mammals, dinosaurs stopped growing when they reached the typical adult size of their species, while mature reptiles continued to grow slowly if they had enough food. Dinosaurs of all sizes grew faster than similarly sized modern reptiles; but the results of comparisons with similarly sized "warm-blooded" modern animals depend on their sizes:

Weight (kg)	Comparative growth rate of dinosaurs	Modern animals in this size range
0.22	Slower than marsupials	Rat
1 – 20	Similar to marsupials, slower than precocial birds (those that are born capable of running)	From guinea pig to Andean condor
100 – 1000	Faster than marsupials, similar to precocial birds, slower than placental mammals	From red kangaroo to polar bear
1500 – 3500	Similar to most placental mammals	From American bison to rhinoceros
25000 and over	Very fast, similar to modern whales; but about half that of a scaled-up altricial bird (one that is born helpless) – if one could scale up a bird to 25,000 kilograms (25 long tons; 28 short tons)	Whales

A graph showing the hypothesized growth curves (body mass versus age) of four tyrannosaurids. Tyrannosaurus rex is drawn in black. Based on Erickson et al. 2004.

Tyrannosaurus rex showed a "teenage growth spurt":

- ½ ton at age 10
- very rapid growth to around two tons in the mid-teens (about ½ ton per year).
- negligible growth after the second decade.

A 2008 study of one skeleton of the hadrosaur Hypacrosaurus concluded that this dinosaur grew even faster, reaching its full size at the age of about 15; the main evidence was the number and spacing of growth rings in its bones. The authors found this consistent with a life-cycle theory that prey species should grow faster than their predators if they lose a lot of juveniles to predators and the local environment provides enough resources for rapid growth.

It appears that individual dinosaurs were rather short-lived, e.g. the oldest (at death) Tyrannosaurus found so far was 28 and the oldest sauropod was 38. Predation was probably responsible for the high death rate of very young dinosaurs and sexual competition for the high death rate of sexually mature dinosaurs.

== Metabolism ==
Scientific opinion about the life-style, metabolism and temperature regulation of dinosaurs has varied over time since the discovery of dinosaurs in the mid-19th century. The activity of metabolic enzymes varies with temperature, so temperature control is vital for any organism, whether endothermic or ectothermic. Organisms can be categorized as poikilotherms (poikilo – changing), which are tolerant of internal temperature fluctuations, and homeotherms (homeo – same), which must maintain a constant core temperature. Animals can be further categorized as endotherms, which regulate their temperature internally, and ectotherms, which regulate temperature by the use of external heat sources.

"Warm-bloodedness" is a complex and rather ambiguous term, because it includes some or all of:

- Homeothermy, i.e. maintaining a fairly constant body temperature. Modern endotherms maintain a variety of temperatures: 28 °C (82 °F) to 30 °C (86 °F) in monotremes and sloths; 33 °C (91 °F) to 36 °C (97 °F) in marsupials; 36 °C (97 °F) to 38 °C (100 °F) in most placentals; and around 41 °C (106 °F) in birds.
- Tachymetabolism, i.e. maintaining a high metabolic rate, particularly when at rest. This requires a fairly high and stable body temperature, since biochemical processes run about half as fast if an animal's temperature drops by 10 °C; most enzymes have an optimum operating temperature and their efficiency drops rapidly outside the preferred range.
- Endothermy, i.e. the ability to generate heat internally, for example by "burning" fat, rather than via behaviors such as basking or muscular activity. Although endothermy is in principle the most reliable way to maintain a fairly constant temperature, it is expensive; for example modern mammals need 10 to 13 times as much food as modern reptiles.

Large dinosaurs may also have maintained their temperatures by inertial homeothermy, also known as "bulk homeothermy" or "mass homeothermy". In other words, the thermal capacity of such large animals was so high that it would take two days or more for their temperatures to change significantly, and this would have smoothed out variations caused by daily temperature cycles. This smoothing effect has been observed in large turtles and crocodilians, but Plateosaurus, which weighed about 700 kilograms (1,500 lb), may have been the smallest dinosaur in which it would have been effective. Inertial homeothermy would not have been possible for small species nor for the young of larger species. Vegetation fermenting in the guts of large herbivores can also produce considerable heat, but this method of maintaining a high and stable temperature would not have been possible for carnivores or for small herbivores or the young of larger herbivores.

Since the internal mechanisms of extinct creatures are unknowable, most discussion focuses on homeothermy and tachymetabolism.

Assessment of metabolic rates is complicated by the distinction between the rates while resting and while active. In all modern reptiles and most mammals and birds the maximum rates during all-out activity are 10 to 20 times higher than minimum rates while at rest. However, in a few mammals these rates differ by a factor of 70. Theoretically it would be possible for a land vertebrate to have a reptilian metabolic rate at rest and a bird-like rate while working flat out. However, an animal with such a low resting rate would be unable to grow quickly. The huge herbivorous sauropods may have been on the move so constantly in search of food that their energy expenditure would have been much the same irrespective of whether their resting metabolic rates were high or low.

=== Theories ===
The main possibilities are that:

- Non-avian dinosaurs were cold-blooded, like modern reptiles, except that the large size of many would have stabilized their body temperatures.
- They were warm-blooded, more like birds or modern mammals than modern reptiles.
- They were neither cold-blooded nor warm-blooded in modern terms, but had metabolisms that were different from and in some ways intermediate between those of modern cold-blooded and warm-blooded animals.
- They included animals with two or three of these types of metabolism.

Non-avian dinosaurs were around for about 150 million years, so it is very likely that different groups evolved different metabolisms and thermoregulatory regimes, and that some developed different physiologies from the first dinosaurs.

If all or some non-avian dinosaurs had intermediate metabolisms, they may have had the following features:

- Low resting metabolic rates—which would reduce the amount of food they needed and allow them to use more of that food for growth than do animals with high resting metabolic rates.
- Inertial homeothermy
- The ability to control heat loss by expanding and contracting blood vessels just under the skin, as many modern reptiles do.
- Two-part circulations driven by four-chambered hearts.
- High aerobic capacity, allowing sustained activity.

Robert Reid has suggested that such animals could be regarded as "failed endotherms". He envisaged both dinosaurs and the Triassic ancestors of mammals passing through a stage with these features. Mammals were forced to become smaller as archosaurs came to dominate ecological niches for medium to large animals. Their decreasing size made them more vulnerable to heat loss because it increased their ratios of surface area to mass, and thus forced them to increase internal heat generation and thus become full endotherms. On the other hand, dinosaurs became medium to very large animals and thus were able to retain the "intermediate" type of metabolism.

=== Bone structure ===
Armand de Ricqlès discovered Haversian canals in dinosaur bones, and argued that there was evidence of endothermy in dinosaurs. These canals are common in "warm-blooded" animals and are associated with fast growth and an active life style because they help to recycle bone to facilitate rapid growth and repair damage caused by stress or injuries. Dense secondary Haversian bone, which is formed during remodeling, is found in many living endotherms as well as dinosaurs, pterosaurs and therapsids. Secondary Haversian canals are correlated with size and age, mechanical stress and nutrient turnover. The presence of secondary Haversian canals suggests comparable bone growth and lifespans in mammals and dinosaurs. Bakker argued that the presence of fibrolamellar bone (produced quickly and having a fibrous, woven appearance) in dinosaur fossils was evidence of endothermy.

However, as a result of other, mainly later research, bone structure is not considered a reliable indicator of metabolism in dinosaurs, mammals or reptiles:

- Dinosaur bones often contain lines of arrested growth (LAGs), formed by alternating periods of slow and fast growth; in fact many studies count growth rings to estimate the ages of dinosaurs. The formation of growth rings is usually driven by seasonal changes in temperature, and this seasonal influence has sometimes been regarded as a sign of slow metabolism and ectothermy. But growth rings are found in polar bears and in mammals that hibernate. The relationship between LAGs and seasonal growth dependency remains unresolved.
- Fibrolamellar bone is fairly common in young crocodilians and sometimes found in adults.
- Haversian bone has been found in turtles, crocodilians and tortoises, but is often absent in small birds, bats, shrews and rodents.

Nevertheless, de Ricqlès persevered with studies of the bone structure of dinosaurs and archosaurs. In mid-2008 he co-authored a paper that examined bone samples from a wide range of archosaurs, including early dinosaurs, and concluded that:

- Even the earliest archosauriforms may have been capable of very fast growth, which suggests they had fairly high metabolic rates. Although drawing conclusions about the earliest archosauriformes from later forms is tricky, because species-specific variations in bone structure and growth rate are very likely, there are research strategies that can minimize the risk that such factors will cause errors in the analysis.
- Archosaurs split into three main groups in the Triassic: ornithodirans, from which dinosaurs evolved, remained committed to rapid growth; crocodilians' ancestors adopted more typical "reptilian" slow growth rates; and most other Triassic archosaurs had intermediate growth rates.

An osteohistological analysis of vascular density and density, shape and area of osteocytes concluded non-avian dinosaurs and the majority of archosauriforms (except Proterosuchus, crocodilians and phytosaurs) retained heat and had resting metabolic rates similar to those of extant mammals and birds.

=== Metabolic rate, blood pressure and flow ===
Endotherms rely highly on aerobic metabolism and have high rates of oxygen consumption during activity and rest. The oxygen required by the tissues is carried by the blood, and consequently blood flow rates and blood pressures at the heart of warm-blooded endotherms are considerably higher than those of cold-blooded ectotherms. It is possible to measure the minimum blood pressures of dinosaurs by estimating the vertical distance between the heart and the top of the head, because this column of blood must have a pressure at the bottom equal to the hydrostatic pressure derived from the density of blood and gravity. Added to this pressure is that required to move the blood through the circulatory system. It was pointed out in 1976 that, because of their height, many dinosaurs had minimum blood pressures within the endothermic range, and that they must have had four-chambered hearts to separate the high pressure circuit to the body from the low pressure circuit to the lungs. It was not clear whether these dinosaurs had high blood pressure simply to support the blood column or to support the high blood flow rates required by endothermy or both.

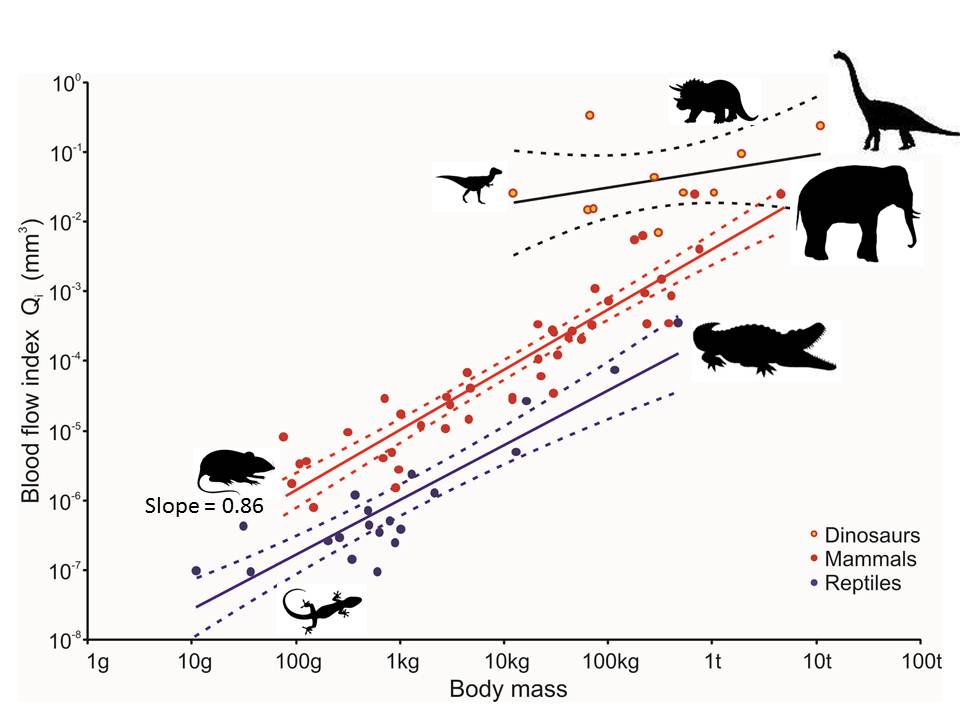
Foramen blood flow index, derived from the size of the nutrient foramen of the femurs of mammals, reptiles and dinosaurs

However, recent analysis of the tiny holes in fossil leg bones of dinosaurs provides a gauge for blood flow rate and hence metabolic rate. The holes are called nutrient foramina, and the nutrient artery is the major blood vessel passing through to the interior of the bone, where it branches into tiny vessels of the Haversian canal system. This system is responsible for replacing old bone with new bone, thereby repairing microbreaks that occur naturally during locomotion. Without this repair, microbreaks would build up, leading to stress fractures and ultimately catastrophic bone failure. The size of the nutrient foramen provides an index of blood flow through it, according to the Hagen-Poiseuille equation. The size is also related to the body size of animal, of course, so this effect is removed by analysis of allometry. Blood flow index of the nutrient foramen of the femurs in living mammals increases in direct proportion to the animals' maximum metabolic rates, as measured during maximum sustained locomotion. Mammalian blood flow index is about 10 times greater than in ectothermic reptiles. Ten species of fossil dinosaurs from five taxonomic groups reveal indices even higher than in mammals, when body size is accounted for, indicating that they were highly active, aerobic animals. Thus high blood flow rate, high blood pressure, a four-chambered heart and sustained aerobic metabolism are all consistent with endothermy.

=== Growth rates ===
Dinosaurs grew from small eggs to several tons in weight relatively quickly. A natural interpretation of this is that dinosaurs converted food into body weight very quickly, which requires a fairly fast metabolism both to forage actively and to assimilate the food quickly. Developing bone found in juveniles is distinctly porous, which has been linked to vascularization and bone deposition rate, all suggesting growth rates close to those observed in modern birds.

But a preliminary study of the relationship between adult size, growth rate, and body temperature concluded that larger dinosaurs had higher body temperatures than smaller ones had; Apatosaurus, the largest dinosaur in the sample, was estimated to have a body temperature exceeding 41 °C (106 °F), whereas smaller dinosaurs were estimated to have body temperatures around 25 °C (77 °F) – for comparison, normal human body temperature is about 37 °C (99 °F). Based on these estimations, the study concluded that large dinosaurs were inertial homeotherms (their temperatures were stabilized by their sheer bulk) and that dinosaurs were ectothermic (in colloquial terms, "cold-blooded", because they did not generate as much heat as mammals when not moving or digesting food). These results are consistent with the relationship between dinosaurs' sizes and growth rates (described above). Studies of the sauropodomorph Massospondylus and early theropod Syntarsus (Megapnosaurus) reveal growth rates of 3 kg/year and 17 kg/year, respectively, much slower than those estimated of Maiasaura and observed in modern birds.

=== Oxygen isotope ratios in bone ===
The ratio of the isotopes ^{16}O and ^{18}O in bone depends on the temperature the bone formed at: the higher the temperature, the more ^{16}O. Barrick and Showers (1999) analyzed the isotope ratios in two theropods that lived in temperate regions with seasonal variation in temperature, Tyrannosaurus (USA) and Giganotosaurus (Argentina):

- dorsal vertebrae from both dinosaurs showed no sign of seasonal variation, indicating that both maintained a constant core temperature despite seasonal variations in air temperature.
- ribs and leg bones from both dinosaurs showed greater variability in temperature and a lower average temperature as the distance from the vertebrae increased.

Barrick and Showers concluded that both dinosaurs were endothermic but at lower metabolic levels than modern mammals, and that inertial homeothermy was an important part of their temperature regulation as adults. Their similar analysis of some Late Cretaceous ornithischians in 1996 concluded that these animals showed a similar pattern.

However this view has been challenged. The evidence indicates homeothermy, but by itself cannot prove endothermy. Secondly, the production of bone may not have been continuous in areas near the extremities of limbs – in allosaur skeletons lines of arrested growth ("LAGs"; rather like growth rings) are sparse or absent in large limb bones but common in the fingers and toes. While there is no absolute proof that LAGs are temperature-related, they could mark times when the extremities were so cool that the bones ceased to grow. If so, the data about oxygen isotope ratios would be incomplete, especially for times when the extremities were coolest. Oxygen isotope ratios may be an unreliable method of estimating temperatures if it cannot be shown that bone growth was equally continuous in all parts of the animal.

=== Predator–prey ratios ===
Bakker argued that:

- cold-blooded predators need much less food than warm-blooded ones, so a given mass of prey can support far more cold-blooded predators than warm-blooded ones.
- the ratio of the total mass of predators to prey in dinosaur communities was much more like that of modern and recent warm-blooded communities than that of recent or fossil cold-blooded communities.
- hence predatory dinosaurs were warm-blooded. And since the earliest dinosaurs (e.g. Staurikosaurus, Herrerasaurus) were predators, all dinosaurs must have been warm-blooded.

This argument was criticized on several grounds and is no longer taken seriously (the following list of criticisms is far from exhaustive):

- Estimates of dinosaur weights vary widely, and even a small variation can make a large difference to the calculated predator–prey ratio.
- His sample may not have been representative. Bakker obtained his numbers by counting museum specimens, but these have a bias towards rare or especially well-preserved specimens, and do not represent what exists in fossil beds. Even fossil beds may not accurately represent the actual populations, for example smaller and younger animals have less robust bones and are therefore less likely to be preserved.
- There are no published predator–prey ratios for large ectothermic predators, because such predators are very rare and mostly occur only on fairly small islands. Large ectothermic herbivores are equally rare. So Bakker was forced to compare mammalian predator–prey ratios with those of fish and invertebrate communities, where life expectancies are much shorter and other differences also distort the comparison.
- The concept assumes that predator populations are limited only by the availability of prey. However other factors such as shortage of nesting sites, cannibalism or predation of one predator on another can hold predator populations below the limit imposed by prey biomass, and this would misleadingly reduce the predator–prey ratio.
- Ecological factors can misleadingly reduce the predator–prey ratio, for example: a predator might prey on only some of the "prey" species present; disease, parasites and starvation might kill some of the prey animals before the predators get a chance to hunt them.
- It is very difficult to state precisely what preys on what. For example, the young of herbivores may be preyed upon by lizards and snakes while the adults are preyed on by mammals. Conversely the young of many predators live largely on invertebrates and switch to vertebrates as they grow.

=== Posture and gait ===
Hip joints and limb postures.

Dinosaurs' limbs were erect and held under their bodies, rather than sprawling out to the sides like those of lizards and newts. The evidence for this is the angles of the joint surfaces and the locations of muscle and tendon attachments on the bones. Attempts to represent dinosaurs with sprawling limbs result in creatures with dislocated hips, knees, shoulders and elbows.

Carrier's constraint states that air-breathing vertebrates with two lungs that flex their bodies sideways during locomotion find it difficult to move and breathe at the same time. This severely limits stamina, and forces them to spend more time resting than moving.

Sprawling limbs require sideways flexing during locomotion (except for tortoises and turtles, which are very slow and whose armor keeps their bodies fairly rigid). However, despite Carrier's constraint, sprawling limbs are efficient for creatures that spend most of their time resting on their bellies and only move for a few seconds at a time—because this arrangement minimizes the energy costs of getting up and lying down.

Erect limbs increase the costs of getting up and lying down, but avoid Carrier's constraint. This indicates that dinosaurs were active animals because natural selection would have favored the retention of sprawling limbs if dinosaurs had been sluggish and spent most of their waking time resting. An active lifestyle requires a metabolism that quickly regenerates energy supplies and breaks down waste products which cause fatigue, i.e., it requires a fairly fast metabolism and a considerable degree of homeothermy.

Additionally, an erect posture demands precise balance, the result of a rapidly functioning neuromuscular system. This suggests endothermic metabolism, because an ectothermic animal would be unable to walk or run, and thus to evade predators, when its core temperature was lowered. Other evidence for endothermy includes limb length (many dinosaurs possessed comparatively long limbs) and bipedalism, both found today only in endotherms. Many bipedal dinosaurs possessed gracile leg bones with a short thigh relative to calf length. This is generally an adaptation to frequent sustained running, characteristic of endotherms which, unlike ectotherms, are capable of producing sufficient energy to stave off the onset of anaerobic metabolism in the muscle.

Bakker and Ostrom both pointed out that all dinosaurs had erect hindlimbs and that all quadrupedal dinosaurs had erect forelimbs; and that among living animals only the endothermic ("warm-blooded") mammals and birds have erect limbs (Ostrom acknowledged that crocodilians' occasional "high walk" was a partial exception). Bakker claimed this was clear evidence of endothermy in dinosaurs, while Ostrom regarded it as persuasive but not conclusive.

A 2009 study supported the hypothesis that endothermy was widespread in at least larger non-avian dinosaurs, and that It was plausibly ancestral for all dinosauriforms, based on the biomechanics of running, though it has also been suggested that endothermy appeared much earlier in archosauromorph evolution, perhaps even preceding the origin of Archosauriformes.

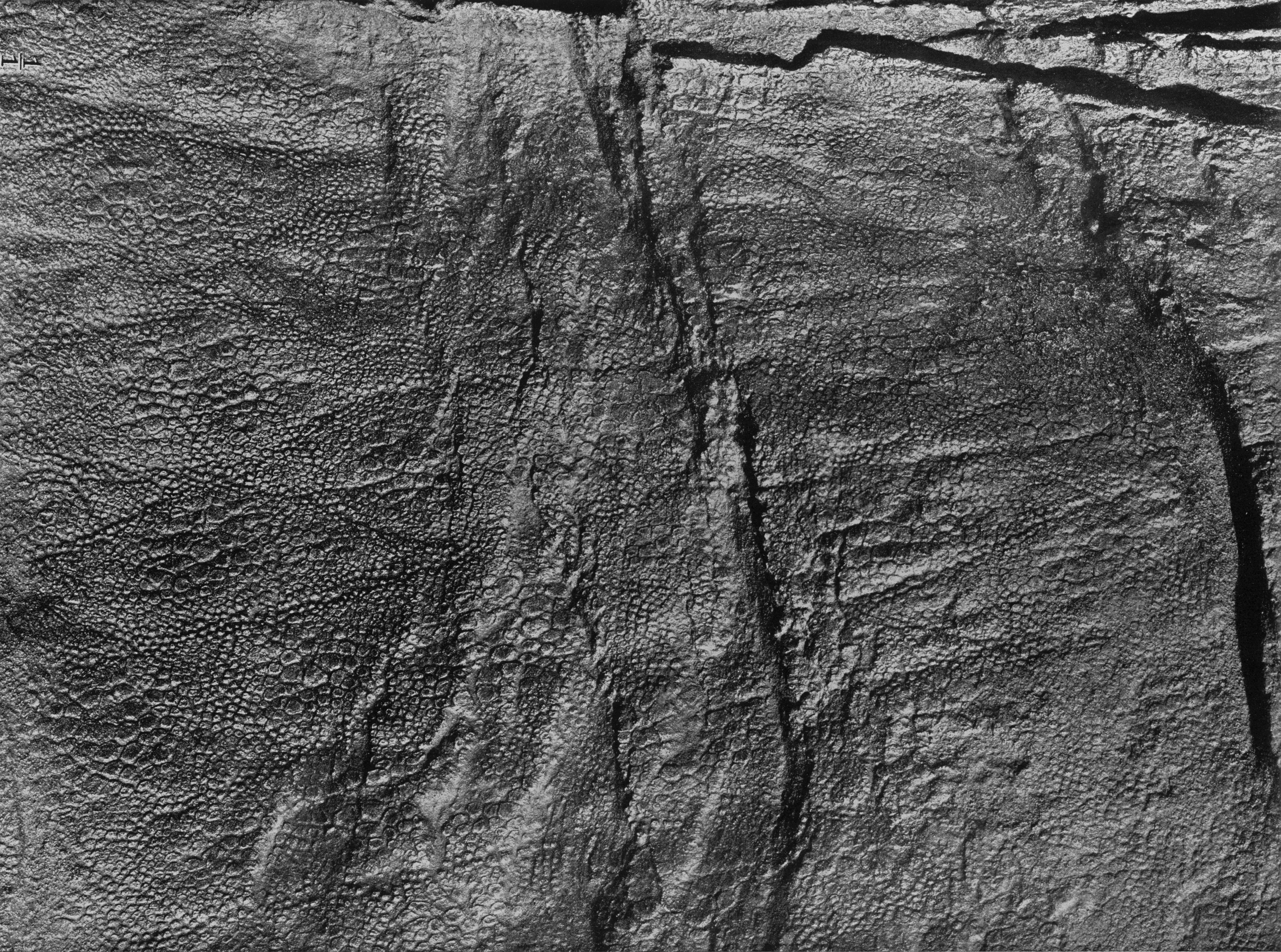
Skin impression of the hadrosaur Edmontosaurus

=== Feathers and filaments ===
There is now no doubt that many theropod dinosaur species had feathers, including Shuvuuia, Sinosauropteryx and Dilong (an early tyrannosaur). These have been interpreted as insulation and therefore evidence of warm-bloodedness.

But direct, unambiguous impressions of feathers have only been found in coelurosaurs (which include the birds and tyrannosaurs, among others), so at present feathers give us no information about the metabolisms of the other major dinosaur groups, e.g. coelophysids, ceratosaurs, carnosaurs, or sauropods. Filamentous integument was also present in at least some ornithischians, such as Tianyulong, Kulindadromeus and Psittacosaurus, not only indicating endothermy in this group, but also that feathers were already present in the first ornithodiran (the last common ancestor of dinosaurs and pterosaurs). Their absence in certain groups like Ankylosauria could be the result of suppression of feather genes. Though filaments only first appeared in Coelurosauria according to maximum likelihood reconstructions and that the integumentary structures of Psittacosaurus, Tianyulong, and Kulindadromeus independently evolved from filaments but this was by assuming primitive pterosaur ancestors were scaly.

The fossilised skin of Carnotaurus (an abelisaurid and therefore not a coelurosaur) shows an unfeathered, reptile-like skin with rows of bumps, but the conclusion that Carnotaurus was necessarily featherless has been criticized as the impressions do not cover the whole body, being found only in the lateral region but not the dorsum. An adult Carnotaurus weighed about 2 tonnes, and mammals of this size and larger have either very short, sparse hair or naked skins, so perhaps the skin of Carnotaurus tells us nothing about whether smaller non-coelurosaurian theropods had feathers. The tyrannosauroid Yutyrannus is known to have possessed feathers and weighed 1.1 tonne.

Skin-impressions of Pelorosaurus and other sauropods (dinosaurs with elephantine bodies and long necks) reveal large hexagonal scales, and some sauropods, such as Saltasaurus, had bony plates in their skin. The skin of ceratopsians consisted of large polygonal scales, sometimes with scattered circular plates. "Mummified" remains and skin impressions of hadrosaurids reveal pebbly scales. It is unlikely that the ankylosaurids, such as Euoplocephalus, had insulation, as most of their surface area was covered in bony knobs and plates. Likewise there is no evidence of insulation in the stegosaurs. Thus insulation, and the elevated metabolic rate behind evolving them, may have been limited to the theropods, or even just a subset of theropods. Lack of feathers or other sort of insulation does not indicate ectothermy or low metabolisms, as observed in the relative hairlessness of mammalian megafauna, pigs, human children and the hairless bat being compatible with endothermy.

=== Polar dinosaurs ===
Dinosaur fossils have been found in regions that were close to the poles at the relevant times, notably in southeastern Australia, Antarctica and the North Slope of Alaska. There is no evidence of major changes in the angle of the Earth's axis, so polar dinosaurs and the rest of these ecosystems would have had to cope with the same extreme variation of day length through the year that occurs at similar latitudes today (up to a full day with no darkness in summer, and a full day with no sunlight in winter).

Studies of fossilized vegetation suggest that the Alaska North Slope had a maximum temperature of 13 °C (55 °F) and a minimum temperature of 2 °C (36 °F) to 8 °C (46 °F) in the last 35 million years of the Cretaceous (slightly cooler than Portland, Oregon but slightly warmer than Calgary, Alberta). Even so, the Alaska North Slope has no fossils of large cold-blooded animals such as lizards and crocodilians, which were common at the same time in Alberta, Montana, and Wyoming. This suggests that at least some non-avian dinosaurs were warm-blooded. It has been proposed that North American polar dinosaurs may have migrated to warmer regions as winter approached, which would allow them to inhabit Alaska during the summers even if they were cold-blooded. But a round trip between there and Montana would probably have used more energy than a cold-blooded land vertebrate produces in a year; in other words the Alaskan dinosaurs would have to be warm-blooded, irrespective of whether they migrated or stayed for the winter. A 2008 paper on dinosaur migration by Phil R. Bell and Eric Snively proposed that most polar dinosaurs, including theropods, sauropods, ankylosaurians, and hypsilophodonts, probably overwintered, although hadrosaurids like Edmontosaurus were probably capable of annual 2,600 km (1,600 mi) round trips.

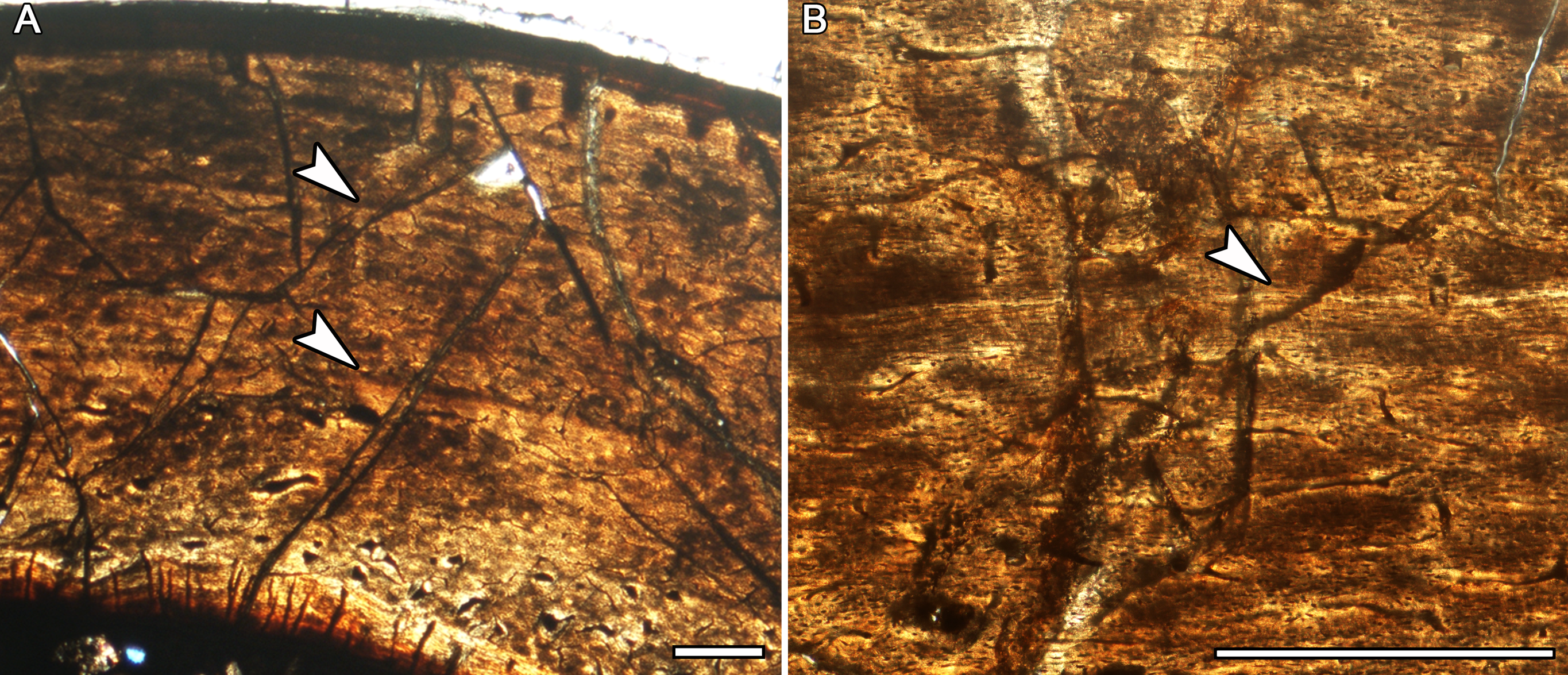
Bone microstructure of polar hypsilophodontid approaching skeletal maturity

It is more difficult to determine the climate of southeastern Australia when the dinosaur fossil beds were laid down 115 to 105 million years ago, towards the end of the Early Cretaceous: these deposits contain evidence of permafrost, ice wedges, and hummocky ground formed by the movement of subterranean ice, which suggests mean annual temperatures ranged between −6 °C (21 °F) and 5 °C (41 °F); oxygen isotope studies of these deposits give a mean annual temperature of 1.5 °C (34.7 °F) to 2.5 °C (36.5 °F). However the diversity of fossil vegetation and the large size of some of fossil trees exceed what is found in such cold environments today, and no-one has explained how such vegetation could have survived in the cold temperatures suggested by the physical indicators – for comparison Fairbanks, Alaska presently has a mean annual temperature of 2.9 °C (37.2 °F). An annual migration from and to southeastern Australia would have been very difficult for fairly small dinosaurs in such as Leaellynasaura, a herbivore about 60 centimetres (2.0 ft) to 90 centimetres (3.0 ft) long, because seaways to the north blocked the passage to warmer latitudes. Bone samples from Leaellynasaura and Timimus, an ornithomimid about 3.5 metres (11 ft) long and 1.5 metres (4.9 ft) high at the hip, suggested these two dinosaurs had different ways of surviving the cold, dark winters: the Timimus sample had lines of arrested growth (LAGs for short; similar to growth rings), and it may have hibernated; but the Leaellynasaura sample showed no signs of LAGs, so it may have remained active throughout the winter. A 2011 study focusing on hypsilophodont and theropod bones also concluded that these dinosaurs did not hibernate through the winter, but stayed active.

=== Evidence for behavioral thermoregulation ===
Some dinosaurs, e.g. Spinosaurus and Ouranosaurus, had on their backs "sails" supported by spines growing up from the vertebrae. (This was also true, incidentally, for the synapsid Dimetrodon.) Such dinosaurs could have used these sails to:

- take in heat by basking with the "sails" at right angles to the sun's rays.
- to lose heat by using the "sails" as radiators while standing in the shade or while facing directly towards or away from the sun.

But these were a very small minority of known dinosaur species. One common interpretation of the plates on stegosaurs' backs is as heat exchangers for thermoregulation, as the plates are filled with blood vessels, which, theoretically, could absorb and dissipate heat.

This might have worked for a stegosaur with large plates, such as Stegosaurus, but other stegosaurs, such as Wuerhosaurus, Tuojiangosaurus and Kentrosaurus possessed much smaller plates with a surface area of doubtful value for thermo-regulation. However, the idea of stegosaurian plates as heat exchangers has recently been questioned.

=== Other evidence ===
Endothermy demands frequent respiration, which can result in water loss. In living birds and mammals, water loss is limited by pulling moisture out of exhaled air with mucus-covered respiratory turbinates, tissue-covered bony sheets in the nasal cavity. Several dinosaurs have olfactory turbinates, used for smell, but none have yet been identified with respiratory turbinates.

Because endothermy allows refined neuromuscular control, and because brain matter requires large amounts of energy to sustain, some speculate that increased brain size indicates increased activity and, thus, endothermy. The encephalization quotient (EQ) of dinosaurs, a measure of brain size calculated using brain endocasts, varies on a spectrum from bird-like to reptile-like. Using EQ alone, coelurosaurs appear to have been as active as living mammals, while theropods and ornithopods fall somewhere between mammals and reptiles, and other dinosaurs resemble reptiles.

A study published by Roger Seymour in 2013 added more support to the idea that dinosaurs were endothermic. After studying saltwater crocodiles, Seymour found that even if their large sizes could provide stable and high body temperatures, during activity the crocodile's ectothermic metabolism provided less aerobic abilities and generate only 14% of the total muscle power of a similar sized endothermic mammal before full fatigue. Seymour reasoned that dinosaurs would have needed to be endothermic since they would have needed better aerobic abilities and higher power generation to compete with and dominate over mammals as active land animals throughout the Mesozoic era.

=== Early archosaur metabolism ===
It appears that the earliest dinosaurs had the features that form the basis for arguments for warm-blooded dinosaurs—especially erect limbs. This raises the question "How did dinosaurs become warm-blooded?" The most obvious possible answers are:

- "Their immediate ancestors (archosaurs) were cold-blooded, and dinosaurs began developing warm-bloodedness very early in their evolution." This implies that dinosaurs developed a significant degree of warm-bloodedness in a very short time, possibly less than 20M years. But in mammals' ancestors the evolution of warm-bloodedness seems to have taken much longer, starting with the beginnings of a secondary palate around the beginning of the mid-Permian and going on possibly until the appearance of hair about 164M years ago in the mid Jurassic).
- "Dinosaurs' immediate ancestors (archosaurs) were at least fairly warm-blooded, and dinosaurs evolved further in that direction." This answer raises 2 problems: (A) The early evolution of archosaurs is still very poorly understood – large numbers of individuals and species are found from the start of the Triassic but only 2 species are known from the very late Permian (Archosaurus rossicus and Protorosaurus speneri); (B) Crocodilians evolved shortly before dinosaurs and are closely related to them, but are cold-blooded (see below).

Crocodilians present some puzzles if one regards dinosaurs as active animals with fairly constant body temperatures. Crocodilians evolved shortly before dinosaurs and, second to birds, are dinosaurs' closest living relatives – but modern crocodilians are cold-blooded. This raises some questions:

- If dinosaurs were to a large extent "warm-blooded", when and how fast did warm-bloodedness evolve in their lineage?
- Modern crocodilians are cold-blooded but have several features associated with warm-bloodedness. How did they acquire these features?

Modern crocodilians are cold-blooded but can move with their limbs erect, and have several features normally associated with warm-bloodedness because they improve the animal's oxygen supply:

- 4-chambered hearts. Mammals and birds have four-chambered hearts. Non-crocodilian reptiles have three-chambered hearts, which are less efficient because they allow oxygenated and de-oxygenated blood to mix and therefore send some de-oxygenated blood out to the body instead of to the lungs. Modern crocodilians' hearts are four-chambered, but are smaller relative to body size and run at lower pressure than those of modern mammals and birds. They also have a bypass that makes them functionally three-chambered when under water, conserving oxygen.
- a diaphragm, which aids breathing.
- a secondary palate, which allows the animal to eat and breathe at the same time.
- a hepatic piston mechanism for pumping the lungs. This is different from the lung-pumping mechanisms of mammals and birds but similar to what some researchers claim to have found in some dinosaurs.

So why did natural selection favor these features, which are important for active warm-blooded creatures but of little apparent use to cold-blooded aquatic ambush predators that spend most of their time floating in water or lying on river banks?

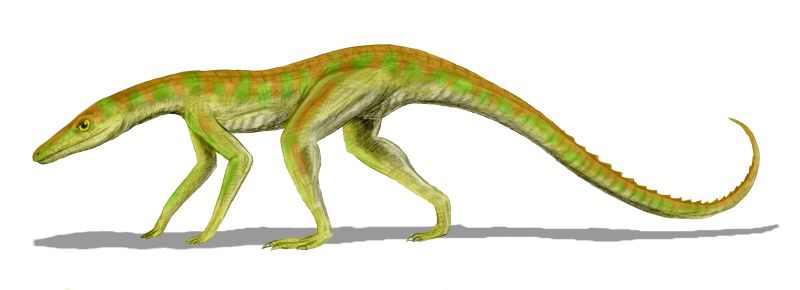
Reconstruction of Terrestrisuchus, a very slim, leggy Triassic crocodylomorph.

It was suggested in the late 1980s that crocodilians were originally active, warm-blooded predators and that their archosaur ancestors were warm-blooded. More recently, developmental studies indicate that crocodilian embryos develop fully four-chambered hearts first—then develop the modifications that make their hearts function as three-chambered under water. Using the principle that ontogeny recapitulates phylogeny, the researchers concluded that the original crocodilians had fully 4-chambered hearts and were therefore warm-blooded and that later crocodilians developed the bypass as they reverted to being cold-blooded aquatic ambush predators.

More recent research on archosaur bone structures and their implications for growth rates also suggests that early archosaurs had fairly high metabolic rates and that the Triassic ancestors of crocodilians dropped back to more typically "reptilian" metabolic rates.

If this view is correct, the development of warm-bloodedness in archosaurs (reaching its peak in dinosaurs) and in mammals would have taken more similar amounts of time. It would also be consistent with the fossil evidence:

- The earliest crocodylomorphs, e.g. Terrestrisuchus, were slim, leggy terrestrial predators.
- Erect limbs appeared quite early in archosaurs' evolution, and those of rauisuchians are very poorly adapted for any other posture.

== See also ==
- Dinosaur classification
- Dinosaur renaissance
- Evolution of dinosaurs
- Evolutionary physiology
- List of dinosaurs
- Origin of birds
- Argentine black and white tegu#Warm-bloodedness
