= Theodore Garland Jr. =

American biologist (born 1956)

- Born: November 28, 1956 (age 68)
- Education: University of Nevada, Las Vegas; University of California, Irvine
- Known for: Lizard locomotor physiology and ecology, allometry, phylogeny
- Scientific career
- Fields: Physiology
- Institutions: University of Wisconsin–Madison; University of California, Riverside
- Doctoral advisor: Albert F. Bennett
- Other academic advisors: Raymond B. Huey

Theodore Garland Jr. (born 28 November 1956) is a biologist specializing in evolutionary physiology at the University of California, Riverside.

== Education ==
Garland earned his B.S in zoology and M.S. in biology at the University of Nevada, Las Vegas, working with William Glen Bradley, a mammalogist, and his Ph.D. in Ecology and Evolutionary Biology at the University of California, Irvine under Albert F. Bennett, a comparative physiologist.

During his Master's degree, he served as President of the Southern Nevada Herpetology Association. During his Ph.D. work, he recorded the maximum speed (34.6 km/h) of what to date remains the world's fastest lizard, Ctenosaura similis. Subsequently, he completed postdoctoral training at the University of Washington with Raymond B. Huey.

== Career ==
He was on the faculty at the University of Wisconsin–Madison for 14 years, served as a program director for the Population Biology and Physiological Ecology Program at the National Science Foundation during 1991–1992, and is currently Distinguished Professor of Biology at the University of California, Riverside in the Department of Evolution, Ecology, and Organismal Biology.

Garland is Editor in Chief of the journal Ecological and Evolutionary Physiology, formerly Physiological and Biochemical Zoology. He is an Associate Editor for Behavior Genetics and on the Editorial Advisory Board of Zoology. Garland is a former Topic Editor for Comprehensive Physiology, and has been on the editorial boards of the Journal of Morphology, The American Naturalist, and Evolution. He was an associate director for the Network for Experimental Research on Evolution, a University of California Multicampus Research Program.

His major scientific contributions have been in the areas of lizard locomotor physiology and ecology, allometry, phylogenetic comparative methods; and the application of artificial selection experiments to understand the correlated evolution of physiology and behavior, as well as the physiological, neurobiological, and genetic bases of voluntary activity levels (physical exercise).

== Research ==
Most generally, Garland is known for helping to found the field of evolutionary physiology, which attempts to combine the questions and approaches of evolutionary biology with those of comparative physiology and ecophysiology, and for various studies of complex traits. He has also studied trade-offs in various systems.

His research has generally fallen into three categories: locomotor physiology of lizards and snakes; the development, testing, and application of phylogenetic comparative methods; and development of the selectively bred High Runner mice.

Recent studies have explored the genetic architecture of the High Runner lines of mice, as well as the effects of early-life exposure to diet and the opportunity for voluntary exercise on adult traits related to exercise behavior and physiology. The latter studies fall under the general heading of phenotypic plasticity and epigenetics.

== Awards ==
In 1983–84, he was a Visiting Fulbright Scholar at the University of Wollongong, Australia, hosted by Anthony J. Hulbert, and in 1985 he received the Outstanding Graduate Student Scholar Award from U.C., Irvine.

In 1991, he received a Presidential Young Investigator Award from the National Science Foundation.

In 2011, he was named a Hansen Distinguished Lecturer by the University of California, Berkeley.

The University of Nevada, Las Vegas named him College of Sciences Alumnus of the Year in April 2017.

In 2023, he received the Doctoral Dissertation Advisor/Mentoring Award from U.C., Riverside.

In 2025, he was named the August Krogh Distinguished Lecturer by the American Physiological Society.

== Publications ==
=== Books ===
- Garland, T. Jr., and M. R. Rose, eds. 2009. Experimental Evolution: Concepts, Methods, and Applications of Selection Experiments. University of California Press, Berkeley, California. xvii + 730 pages. PDF file

=== Selected papers ===
- Garland, T. Jr. (1983). "The relation between maximal running speed and body mass in terrestrial mammals" (PDF). Journal of Zoology, London. 199 (2): 157–170. doi:10.1111/j.1469-7998.1983.tb02087.x.
- Garland, T. Jr.; Adolph, S. C. (1991). "Physiological differentiation of vertebrate populations" (PDF). Annual Review of Ecology and Systematics. 22: 193–228. doi:10.1146/annurev.ecolsys.22.1.193.
- Garland, T. Jr., and S. C. Adolph. 1994. Why not to do two-species comparative studies: limitations on inferring adaptation. Physiological Zoology 67:797-828. PDF
- Garland, T. Jr.; Carter, P. A. (1994). "Evolutionary physiology" (PDF). Annual Review of Physiology. 56: 579–621. doi:10.1146/annurev.physiol.56.1.579. PMID 8010752.
- Garland, T. Jr.; Bennett, A. F.; Rezende, E. L. (2005). "Phylogenetic approaches in comparative physiology" (PDF). Journal of Experimental Biology. 208 (16): 3015–3035. doi:10.1242/jeb.01745. PMID 16081601. S2CID 14871059.
- Garland, T. Jr.; Downs, C. J.; Ives, A. R. (2022). "Trade-offs (and constraints) in organismal biology". Physiological and Biochemical Zoology. 95 (1): 82–112. doi:10.1086/717897. PMID 34905443.
- Swallow, J. G.; Garland, T. Jr. (2005). "Selection experiments as a tool in evolutionary and comparative physiology: insights into complex traits - An introduction to the symposium" (PDF). Integrative and Comparative Biology. 45 (3): 387–390. doi:10.1093/icb/45.3.387. PMID 21676784. S2CID 2305227.
- Garland, T. Jr.; Schutz, H.; Chappell, M. A.; Keeney, B. K.; Meek, T. H.; Copes, L. E.; Acosta, W.; Drenowatz, C.; Maciel, R. C.; van Dijk, G.; Kotz, C. M.; Eisenmann, J. C. (2011). "The biological control of voluntary exercise, spontaneous physical activity and daily energy expenditure in relation to obesity: human and rodent perspectives" (PDF). Journal of Experimental Biology. 214 (2): 206–229. doi:10.1242/jeb.048397. PMC 3008631. PMID 21177942.
