= I. M. Sechenov Institute of Evolutionary Physiology and Biochemistry =

Research facility in Saint Petersburg, Russia

The I. M. Sechenov Institute of Evolutionary Physiology and Biochemistry (IEPHB) is a facility in Saint Petersburg, Russia, dedicated to research in the fields of biochemistry and evolutionary physiology.

== History ==
The Institute was founded as a research group in October 1950 by Leon Orbeli, a physiologist and a longtime collaborator with Ivan Pavlov. Initially, Orheli's research group included eight people. It subsequently expanded and transformed into the Laboratory of Evolutionary Physiology of the USSR Academy of Sciences, with the main object of studying functions of the nervous system in animals and man during ontogenesis, and also the effects of ionizing radiation on animals.

In 1956, the Laboratory became an Institute with Orbeli serving as the first Director of Evolutionary Physiology of the Academy of Sciences. The new Institute was named after Ivan Sechenov. By the end of 1957, the Institute numbered 9 laboratories, one of them being transferred from the former P.F. Lesgaft Institute for Natural Sciences.

After Orbeli's death in 1958, the Institute was headed by his collaborator Professor Alexander Ginetsinsky. From June 1960 to March 1975, the Institute was guided by Eugenie Kreps: a former pupil of Ivan Pavlov and collaborator of Orbeli's, Kreps is known for his fundamental studies in the field of comparative physiology and biochemistry of the nervous system. Kreps promoted research in evolutionary biochemistry. In response, in 1964, the Institute adopted its current name, I. M. Sechenov Institute of Evolutionary Physiology and Biochemistry. From 1975 to 1981 Institute was headed by Vladimir Govyrin, and from 1981 to 2004 by Vladimir Svidersky.

== Journal of Evolutionary Biochemistry and Physiology ==
The Institute is publisher of the Journal of Evolutionary Biochemistry and Physiology (ISSN 0022-0930) which is abstracted in the Chemical Abstracts. The journal is also available online by subscription only (online ISSN 1608-3202). Contents and abstracts are available online in PDF format.

== See also ==
- Evolutionary physiology
