= August Krogh =

Danish physiologist (1874–1949)

- Undated portrait of Krogh, around 1900
- Born: Schack August Steenberg Krogh; 15 November 1874; Grenaa, Denmark
- Died: 13 September 1949 (aged 74); Copenhagen
- Education: University of Copenhagen
- Known for: Diffusing capacity for carbon monoxide Perfusion; Krogh model Krogh length Krogh's principle
- Spouse: Marie Krogh (m. 1905; died 1943)
- Children: Erik Viggo Krogh; Ellen Rigmor Krogh; Agnes Helga Krogh; Bodil Schmidt Nielsen
- Awards: Baly Medal (1945); Croonian Medal (1940); Nobel Prize in Physiology or Medicine (1920)
- Scientific career
- Fields: Zoophysiology
- Workplaces: University of Copenhagen
- Thesis: Frøernes Hud- og Lungerespiration (1903)
- Doctoral advisor: Christian Bohr
- Notable students: Knut Schmidt-Nielsen; Hans Ussing; Torkel Weis-Fogh

Schack August Steenberg Krogh ForMemRS (15 November 1874 – 13 September 1949) was a Danish professor at the department of zoophysiology at the University of Copenhagen from 1916 to 1945. He contributed a number of fundamental discoveries within several fields of physiology, and is famous for developing Krogh's principle.

In 1920 August Krogh was awarded the Nobel Prize in Physiology or Medicine for the discovery of the mechanism of regulation of the capillaries in skeletal muscle. Krogh was first to describe the adaptation of blood perfusion in muscle and other organs according to demands through opening and closing the arterioles and capillaries.

Besides his contributions to medicine, Krogh was also one of the founders of what is today the Novo company.

== Life ==
He was born in Grenaa on the peninsula of Djursland in Denmark, the son of Viggo Krogh, a shipbuilder. His mother (born Drechmann) was the daughter of a customs officer in Holstein. Through his mother’s family he claimed "a dash of gipsy blood in his veins". When he finished school in 1889 at the age of 14, he was still too young to start cathedral school. He signed up as a voluntary 'marine intern' and served time on the gunboat HDMS Hauch, traversing the Danish waters surveying the benthic fauna under C.G. Joh. Petersen. The following year Krogh moved to Aarhus to continue his education at the Aarhus Katedralskole. He attended the University of Copenhagen graduating MSc in 1899 and gaining a doctorate PhD in 1903.

Krogh was a pioneer in comparative physiology. He wrote his thesis on the respiration through the skin and lungs in frogs: Respiratory Exchange of Animals, 1915. Later Krogh took on studies of water and electrolyte homeostasis of aquatic animals and he published the books: Osmotic Regulation (1939) and Comparative Physiology of Respiratory Mechanisms (1941). He contributed more than 200 research articles in international journals. He was a constructor of scientific instruments of which several had considerable practical importance, such as the spirometer and the apparatus for measuring basal metabolic rate.

Krogh began lecturing in the University of Copenhagen in 1908 and in 1916 was promoted to full professor, becoming the head of the first laboratory for animal physiology (zoophysiology) at the university.

Krogh was elected an International Honorary Member of the American Academy of Arts and Sciences in 1931, an International Member of the United States National Academy of Sciences in 1937, and an International Member of the American Philosophical Society in 1941.

In the 1930s, Krogh worked with two other Nobel prizewinners, the radiochemist George de Hevesy and the physicist Niels Bohr on the permeability of membranes to heavy water and radioactive isotopes, and together, they managed to obtain Denmark's first cyclotron for experiments on animal and plant physiology as well as in dental and medical work.

=== Friendship with William Sørensen ===
Krogh had a lifelong friendship with William Sørensen, arachnologist and 'enfant terrible' of Danish zoology at the time. Sørensen was 26 years older than Krogh, but was a childhood friend of Krogh's father Viggo Krogh. Sørensen had a forming influence on the young Krogh and helped spawn his interest in the natural sciences. After Sørensen's death in 1916, Krogh stated that Sørensen was "my teacher into scientific method". Krogh was a common guest in Sørensen's home and he would visit the Sørensen family for lunch almost every Sunday. Sørensen was himself a well-esteemed arachnologist, student of professor J.M.C.Schiödte. Schiödte, however, was in fierce opposition to his colleague and the leading Danish zoologist in the latter half of the 19th century, Japetus Steenstrup. Krogh and Sørensen sided with Schiödte and his other students, and Krogh helped Sørensen when he wrote his blunt and direct attacks on the opposing side, accusing them (not entirely unwarranted) of scientific plagiarism and prioritizing friendships and loyalty over scientific merit. Krogh's siding with Sørensen earned him some influential enemies among the faculty of the university, including Eug. Warming, but this appears not to have had significant influence on his later career. Warming was thus on the committee that recommended opening a position for Krogh as lecturer in animal physiology to the Ministry of Finances in 1908.

== Foundation of Novo ==
In 1922, August Krogh went on a lecture tour to North America after receiving the Nobel Prize in Physiology or Medicine. During this tour, he and his wife Marie, a doctor who was herself suffering from a type 2 diabetes, visited Toronto where the scientists Frederick Banting, Charles Best and John Macleod had just succeeded in manufacturing active insulin. Krogh received permission to manufacture insulin in the Nordic countries and joined forces with Hans Christian Hagedorn, a physician specialising in diabetes, to start the production of insulin in Denmark. This led to the establishment of Nordisk Insulinlaboratorium company in 1923.

In 1925, brothers Harald and Thorvald Pedersen, who were former employees of Nordisk Insulinlaboratorium, formed their own company, Novo Terapeutisk Laboratorium. Novo Terapeutisk Laboratorium (later Novo Industri) and Nordisk Insulinlaboratorium (later Nordisk Gentofte) competed until they merged in 1989 to become Novo.

== Family ==
He married Marie Krogh (née Jørgensen, 1874–1943) in 1905. She was a renowned scientist in her own right and much of August Krogh's work was carried out in close collaboration with her.

August and Marie had four children, the youngest of whom, Bodil, was born in 1918. She too was a physiologist, and became the first woman president of the American Physiological Society in 1975. Bodil married another eminent physiologist, Knut Schmidt-Nielsen.

== Legacy ==
Torkel Weis-Fogh, an eminent pioneer on the study of insect flight, was a student of August Krogh's. Together they wrote a classic paper on that subject in 1951.

Krogh's name is preserved in two items now named for him:

- Krogh length, the distance between capillaries which nutrients diffuse to, based on cellular consumption of the nutrients.
- Krogh's principle, that "for... a large number of problems there will be some animal of choice, or a few such animals, on which it can be most conveniently studied."

He via his book, The Anatomy and Physiology of Capillaries, popularized the false belief that if you were to lay out all the blood vessels from a human body they would reach 100,000 km in length. He made false assumptions about capillary density while also using a hypothetical body that weighed 140 kg with 50 kg of pure muscle, an unrealistic physique, to get his round figure of 100,000 km. Recent finding suggest that the actual figure is somewhere between 9,000–19,000 km.

== Publications ==
- The Respiratory Exchange of Animals and Man (1916)
- Osmotic Regulation in Aquatic Animals (1939)
- The Comparative Physiology of Respiratory Mechanisms (1941)
