= Krogh's principle =

Krogh's principle states that "for such a large number of problems there will be some animal of choice, or a few such animals, on which it can be most conveniently studied." This concept is central to those disciplines of biology that rely on the comparative method, such as neuroethology, comparative physiology, and more recently functional genomics.

== History ==
Krogh's principle is named after the Danish physiologist August Krogh, winner of the Nobel Prize in Physiology for his contributions to understanding the anatomy and physiology of the capillary system, who described it in The American Journal of Physiology in 1929. However, the principle was first elucidated nearly 60 years prior to this, and in almost the same words as Krogh, in 1865 by Claude Bernard, the French instigator of experimental medicine, on page 27 of his "Introduction à l'étude de la médecine expérimentale":

Dans l'investigation scientifique, les moindres procédés sont de la plus haute importance. Le choix heureux d'un animal, d'un instrument construit d'une certaine façon, l'emploi d'un réactif au lieu d'un autre, suffisent souvent pour résoudre les questions générales les plus élevées. ("In scientific research, the tiniest processes are of the greatest importance. The lucky choice of animal, of an instrument built in a particular way, the use of one reagent instead of another, often suffice to solve general questions of the highest order.")

— Claude Bernard, Introduction à l'étude de la médecine expérimentale, J.B. Baillière et Fils, Libraires de L'Académie Impériale de Médecine, 1865. pp. 400

Krogh wrote the following in his 1929 treatise on the then current 'status' of physiology (emphasis added):

...I want to emphasize that the route by which we can strive toward the ideal is by a study of the vital functions in all their aspects throughout the myriads of organisms. We may find out, nay, we will find out before very long the essential mechanisms of mammalian kidney function, but the general problem of excretion can be solved only when excretory organs are studied wherever we find them and in all their essential modifications. Such studies will be sure, moreover, to expand and deepen our insight into problems of the human kidney and will prove of value also from the narrowest utilitarian point of view. For such a large number of problems there will be some animal of choice or a few such animals on which it can be most conveniently studied. Many years ago when my teacher, Christian Bohr, was interested in the respiratory mechanism of the lung and devised the method of studying the exchange through each lung separately, he found that a certain kind of tortoise possessed a trachea dividing into the main bronchi high up in the neck, and we used to say as a laboratory joke that this animal had been created expressly for the purposes of respiration physiology. I have no doubt that there is quite a number of animals which are similarly "created" for special physiological purposes, but I am afraid that most of them are unknown to the men for whom they were "created," and we must apply to the zoologists to find them and lay our hands on them."

— August Krogh, The Progress of Physiology, The American Journal of Physiology, 1929. 90(2) pp. 243-251

"Krogh's principle" was not utilized as a formal term until 1975 when the biochemist Hans Adolf Krebs (who initially described the Citric Acid Cycle), first referred to it.

More recently, at the International Society for Neuroethology meeting in Nyborg, Denmark in 2004, Krogh's principle was cited as a central principle by the group at their 7th Congress. Krogh's principle has also been receiving attention in the area of functional genomics, where there has been increasing pressure and desire to expand genomics research to a more wide variety of organisms beyond the traditional scope of the field.

== Philosophy and applications ==
A central concept to Krogh's principle is evolutionary adaptation. Evolutionary theory maintains that organisms are suited to particular niches, some of which are highly specialized for solving particular biological problems. These adaptations are typically exploited by biologists in several ways:

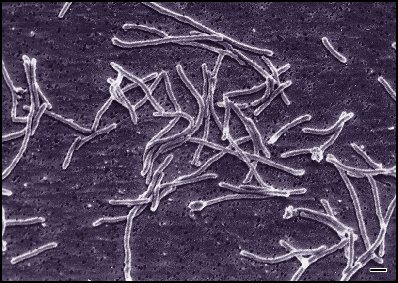
Thermus aquaticus

- Methodology: (e.g. Taq polymerase and PCR): The need to manipulate biological systems in the laboratory has driven the use of an organismal specialization. One example of Krogh's principle presents itself in the heavily used Polymerase Chain Reaction (PCR), a method which relies on the rapid exposure of DNA to high heat for amplification of particular sequences of interest. DNA polymerase enzyme from many organisms would denature at high temperatures, however, to solve this problem, Chien and colleagues turned to Thermus aquaticus, a strain of bacteria native to hydrothermal vents. Thermus aquaticus has a polymerase that is heat stable at temperatures necessary for PCR. Biochemically modified Taq polymerase, as it is usually called, is now routinely used in PCR applications.
- Overcoming technical limitations: (e.g. large neurons in Mollusca): Two Nobel Prize–winning bodies of study were facilitated by using ideas central to Krogh's principle to overcome technical limitations in nervous system physiology. The ionic basis of the action potential was elucidated in the squid giant axon in 1958 by Hodgkin and Huxley, developers of the original voltage clamp device and co-recipients of the 1963 Nobel Prize in Physiology or Medicine. The voltage clamp is now a central piece of technology in modern neurophysiology, but was only possible to develop using the wide diameter of the squid giant axon. Another marine mollusc, the opisthobranch Aplysia possesses relatively small number of large nerve cells that are easily identified and mapped from individual to individual. Aplysia was selected for these reasons for the study of the cellular and molecular basis of learning and memory which led to Eric Kandel's receipt of the Nobel Prize in 2000.

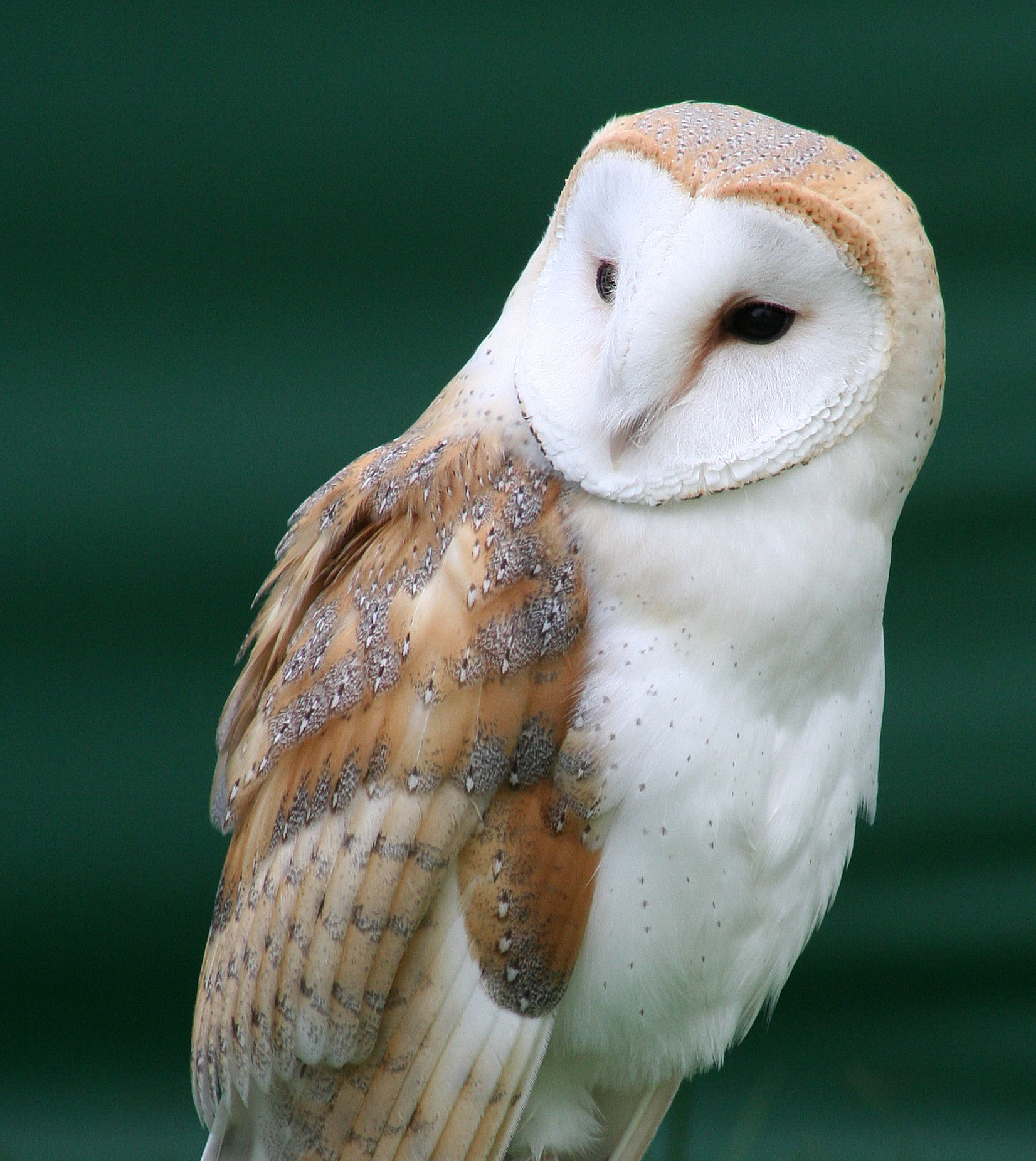
Tyto alba, the Barn Owl

- Understanding more complex/subtle systems (e.g. Barn owls and sound localization): Beyond overcoming technical limitations, Krogh's principle has particularly important implications in the light of convergent evolution and homology. Either because of evolutionary history, or particular constraints on a given niche, there are not infinite solutions to all biological problems. Instead, organisms utilize similar neural algorithms, behaviors, or even structures to accomplish similar tasks. If one's goal is to understand how the nervous system might localize objects using sound, one may take the approach of using an auditory 'specialist' such as the barn owl studied by Mark Konishi, Eric Knudsen and their colleagues. A nocturnal predator by nature, the barn owl relies heavily on using precise information on the time of arrival of sound in its ears. The information gleaned from this approach has contributed heavily to our understanding of how the brain maps sensory space, and how nervous systems encode timing information.

== See also ==
- August Krogh
- Comparative physiology
- Evolutionary physiology
- Krogh length
- Neuroethology
