= Madhu Sudan Kanungo =

Indian gerontologist (1927–2011)

- Born: 1 April 1927; Berhampur, Odisha, India
- Died: 26 July 2011 (aged 84); Varanasi, India
- Occupation: Scientist
- Known for: Founder Co-ordinator Brain Research Centre, Banaras Hindu University
- Spouse: Sarat Kanungo
- Awards: Padma Shri; Shanti Swarup Bhatnagar award

Madhu Sudan Kanungo (1 April 1927 – 26 July 2011) was an Indian scientist in the field of gerontology and neuroscience as well as a teacher of molecular biology and biochemistry. He is known for his theories on how gene expression changes with age and the role of this phenomenon in ageing, which is a widely accepted as "Gene expression theory of Aging". In recognition of his contributions, he was awarded India's fourth highest civilian award, Padma Shri in 2005. He held the post of BHU Emeritus professor in zoology at the Banaras Hindu University and was also the Chancellor, Nagaland University till his death.

== Education ==
He completed his Bachelor in Science from Utkal University in the year 1949. After that, he moved to Lucknow University from where he completed his MSc in Zoology in 1951. After a short tenure of doing research at Lucknow university followed by serving as a lecturer in Zoology at the Ravenshaw College, Cuttack, he went to the University of Illinois (Urbana), US for advanced studies. He has completed his PhD on Physiology under the scientist Prof. Clifford Ladd Prosser from University of Illinois at Urbana–Champaign, US in 1959 where he worked on the physiological and biochemical adaptation of goldfish to temperature variation and studied its effect on oxygen consumption under both normal and experimental conditions. He also studied oxygen consumption and oxidative phosphorylation of liver mitochondria of goldfish as a part of the same study.

== Professional life ==
He started his early life as a lecturer in Zoology, Ravenshaw College, Cuttack. He then joined Utkal University in Feb. 1961 as a Reader in Zoology and continued teaching for a year. He joined the Department of Zoology at Banaras Hindu University and served as a reader (1962–69) and as a professor (1970–87). He was Head, Department of Zoology (1974–76 and 1980–82), Coordinator of the Center of Advanced Study, and Dean, Faculty of Science (1986) at Banaras Hindu University. Professor Kanungo was founder Director of Institute of Lifesciences, Bhubaneswar in 1989, established by Government of Odisha which was taken over by Department of Biotechnology, Government of India in 2002 and declared a National Centre for excellence in 2003. He served as Emeritus Professor of Banaras Hindu University from 1993 to 2011. He was an active and popular teacher of physiology and biochemistry at Banaras Hindu University for more than 40 years.

For research, he took up the problem of ageing to find out the biochemical and molecular changes that occur in the brain and other organs of the rat as a function of age. He made the following original and important findings: not only the levels of several enzymes decrease, but also their isoenzymes change with increasing age; the decrease in their levels can be prevented by administration of steroid hormones whose receptors are present in the brain; decrease in enzyme levels is due to increasing compaction of chromatin that prevents acetylation of histones and decreases transcription; he proposed a model for ageing and showed that trans-acting protein factors that bind to cis-acting elements in the promoter of genes change with age. As signals from the brain cause expression of neurotransmitters in the brain, the neurotransmitter receptors (NT), both excitatory and inhibitory, change with age; also enzymes necessary for synthesis of NT change during the life span of the rat. Kanungo was the founder director of the Institute of Life Sciences of Government of Odisha at Bhubaneswar. He worked hard with the then chief minister of Odisha, Biju Patnaik, for establishing the institute during the late 1980s which is now a DBT Institute.

Until his death, Prof. M. S. Kanungo continued working on topics such as expression of genes and proteins involved in neurotransmission and recycling of neurotransmitters in the brain as a function of age;studying genes and proteins to understand the molecular mechanism involved in the process of learning and memory during ageing;expression of genes involved in formation of blood brain barrier (BBB) as a function of age and under different types of stress.

== Promotion of gerontology ==
Kanungo was the founder president (1981–88) and patron (1989–2011) of the Association of Gerontology of India (AGI), which had three components: biological, socio-psychological and medical for research and planning on the ageing and the elderly. He was also an active member of the National Council for Older Persons (N. C. O. P.) of Govt. of India, Ministry of Social Justice & Empowerment from 1999–2011, which proposed the National Initiative for Care of Elderly (NICE) policy. M. S. Kanungo's devotion and dedication to teaching and research in the field of physiology & biochemistry and ageing was absolute His publications and lectures on ageing have brought into focus the importance of the problem of Gerontology, and the field has been accepted as a thrust area for research and teaching since the 1970s by several scientific agencies like UGC, CSIR, ICMR, DST and DBT. He has also received grants from International agencies like the Nuffield Foundation, London, UK and PL-480, US. Also, scientists in several Universities and Research Institutes in India have taken up this problem for research.Prof.Kanungo founded the Association of Gerontology (India) – AGI – with headquarters at Banaras Hindu University in 1982. AGI covers the three main areas of Gerontology: biological, medical and socio-psychological. Moreover, Prof. Kanungo has popularised the subject of Gerontology by writing popular articles on Ageing in Science Today, Science Reporter, etc.and by giving lectures at various Institutes and Universities. The subject is being taught as a course in various universities, both in Science and Humanities. He had published 139 papers in the area of 'Biology of Ageing' and two single authored books: ‘Biochemistry of Ageing’ (Academic Press, U. K., 1980; translated into Russian) and ‘Genes and Aging’ (Cambridge Univ. Press, U. K., 1994). His research group in ageing is internationally well known. He had proposed a theory and a model on ageing in 1975, which is known as ‘Gene Regulation Theory of Aging’. His research has shown how activities of many physiological/metabolic enzymes, chromatin structure and its post-translational modifications and function(s) as well as expression of genes change during the ageing process in mammals and birds.

== Books written ==
- Genes & Aging, Cambridge University Press, (1993) ISBN 0-521-38299-8, ISBN 978-0-521-38299-1
- Biochemistry of Aging, Academic Press, London, (1980) ISBN 0-12-396450-4, ISBN 978-0-12-396450-2

== Awards ==
- Padma Shri (2005)
- SS Bhatnagar Prize (Biology) (1971)
- Jawaharlal Nehru Fellowship (1987)
- Golden Jubilee Commemoration medal, INSA (1992)
- Sir Sriram memorial Oration award, National Academy of Medical Sciences, (1998)
- Fellowship of Indian Chambers of Commerce & Industry (FICCI)(1989)
- Third Age Award-14th International Congress of Gerontology, Mexico (1989)
- Fellow of Indian National Science Academy, New Delhi (1975)
- Indian Academy of Sciences, Bangalore (1975)
- National Academy of Sciences, Allahabad (1989)
- National Academy of Medical Sciences, India (1996)
- Indian Academy of Neuroscience (2008)
- National Fellow (1976–77)
- National Lecturer (1982) of UGC
- Emeritus Scientist of C. S. I. R. (1989–94)
- Senior Scientist INSA (1995–99)
- Chancellor of Nagaland University (2009–2011)
