= Ecological and Evolutionary Physiology =

- Discipline: Zoology
- Language: English

Publication details
- History: 1928-present
- Publisher: University of Chicago Press on behalf of the Society for Integrative and Comparative Biology (United States)
- Frequency: Bimonthly

Standard abbreviations
- ISO 4: Ecol. Evol. Physiol.

Indexing
- CODEN: PBZOF6
- ISSN: 2993-7965 (print); 2993-7973 (web)
- LCCN: sn98001300
- JSTOR: 15222152
- OCLC no.: 732865910

Links
- Journal homepage

Ecological and Evolutionary Physiology is a peer-reviewed scientific journal published by the University of Chicago Press on behalf of the Society for Integrative and Comparative Biology. The journal publishes original research examining fundamental questions about how the ecological environment and/or evolutionary history interact with physiological function, as well as the ways physiology may constrain behavior. For EEP, physiology denotes the study of function in the broadest sense, across levels of organization from molecules to morphology to organismal performance and on behavior and life history traits.

Subdisciplines and topics covered by the journal include comparative physiology, biomechanics and functional morphology, behavioral endocrinology, ecoimmunology, ecotoxicology, ecomorphology, phenotypic plasticity, energetics, allometry and scaling, animal locomotion and muscle function, physiological foundations of behavior, physiological genetics and genomics, individual variation, cardiovascular physiology, sensory physiology, nutrition and digestion, growth and development, osmoregulation, epithelial and membrane transport, gas exchange and transport, acid-base homeostasis, thermoregulation, temperature responses and adaptation, structure and function of macromolecules, neuro-endocrine physiology and signal transduction, nitrogen metabolism and excretion.

The journal has published a number of Focused Collections based on calls for papers or conference symposia. Examples include Conservation Physiology, Ecoimmunology, Early-Life Effects on the Adult Phenotype, Functional Morphology and Biomechanics, and Trade-Offs in Ecological and Evolutionary Physiology.

The current editor-in-chief is Theodore Garland, Jr. (University of California, Riverside). Previous Editors include Charles Manning Child, Warder Clyde Allee, Clifford Ladd Prosser, Warren W. Burggren, James Hicks, Patricia Schulte, and Kathleen M Gilmour.

The journal was established in 1928 as Physiological Zoology, and the name was changed to Physiological and Biochemical Zoology in 1999. In 2024, beginning with Volume 97, the journal was renamed again to Ecological and Evolutionary Physiology.
