= Evolutionary physiology =

Study of evolutionary changes in physiological characteristics

Natural and sexual selection are often presumed to act most directly on behavior (e.g., what an animal chooses to do when confronted by a predator), which is expressed within limits set by whole-organism performance abilities (e.g., how fast it can run) that are determined by subordinate traits (e.g., muscle fiber-type composition). A weakness of this conceptual and operational model is the absence of an explicit recognition of the place of life history traits.

Evolutionary physiology is the study of the biological evolution of physiological structures and processes; that is, the manner in which the functional characteristics of organisms have responded to natural selection or sexual selection or changed by random genetic drift across multiple generations during the history of a population or species. It is a sub-discipline of both physiology and evolutionary biology. Practitioners in the field come from a variety of backgrounds, including physiology, evolutionary biology, ecology, and genetics.

Accordingly, the range of phenotypes studied by evolutionary physiologists is broad, including life history traits, behavior, whole-organism performance, functional morphology, biomechanics, anatomy, classical physiology, endocrinology, biochemistry, and molecular evolution. The field is closely related to comparative physiology, ecophysiology, and environmental physiology, and its findings are a major concern of evolutionary medicine. One definition that has been offered is "the study of the physiological basis of fitness, namely, correlated evolution (including constraints and trade-offs) of physiological form and function associated with the environment, diet, homeostasis, energy management, longevity, and mortality and life history characteristics".

== History ==
The origins of evolutionary physiology can be traced to early 20th-century Russian biology. In 1914, zoologist A. N. Severtsov published work on the evolutionary morphology of organ systems, linking physiological function with adaptive evolution. Severtsov and his students developed a Soviet tradition of integrating physiology, morphology, and evolutionary theory, which influenced later studies of adaptation in both plants and animals. As the name implies, evolutionary physiology is the product of a merger between two distinct scientific disciplines. According to Garland and Carter, evolutionary physiology arose in the late 1970s, following debates concerning the metabolic and thermoregulatory status of dinosaurs (see physiology of dinosaurs) and mammal-like reptiles.

This period was followed by attempts in the early 1980s to integrate quantitative genetics into evolutionary biology, which had spillover effects on other fields, such as behavioral ecology and ecophysiology. In the mid- to late 1980s, phylogenetic comparative methods started to become popular in many fields, including physiological ecology and comparative physiology. A 1987 volume titled New Directions in Ecological Physiology had little ecology but a considerable emphasis on evolutionary topics. It generated vigorous debate, and within a few years the National Science Foundation had developed a panel titled Ecological and Evolutionary Physiology.

Shortly thereafter, selection experiments and experimental evolution became increasingly common in evolutionary physiology. Macrophysiology has emerged as a sub-discipline, in which practitioners attempt to identify large-scale patterns in physiological traits (e.g. patterns of co-variation with latitude) and their ecological implications.

More recently, the importance of evolutionary physiology has been argued from the perspective of functional analyses, epigenetics, and an extended evolutionary synthesis. The growth of evolutionary physiology is also reflected in the emergence of sub-disciplines, such as evolutionary biomechanics and evolutionary endocrinology, which addresses such hybrid questions as "What are the most common endocrine mechanisms that respond to selection on behavior or life-history traits?"

== Emergent properties ==
As a hybrid scientific discipline, evolutionary physiology provides some unique perspectives. For example, an understanding of physiological mechanisms can help in determining whether a particular pattern of phenotypic variation or co-variation (such as an allometric relationship) represents what could possibly exist or just what selection has allowed. Similarly, a thorough knowledge of physiological mechanisms can greatly enhance understanding of possible reasons for evolutionary correlations and constraints than is possible for many of the traits typically studied by evolutionary biologists (such as morphology).

== Areas of research ==
Important areas of current research include:

- Organismal performance as a central phenotype (e.g., measures of speed or stamina in animal locomotion)
- Role of behavior in physiological evolution
- Physiological and endocrinological basis of variation in life history traits (e.g., clutch size)
- Functional significance of molecular evolution
- Genomic basis of adaptation
- Extent to which species differences are adaptive
- Physiological underpinnings of limits to geographic ranges
- Geographic variation in physiology
- Role of sexual selection in shaping physiological evolution
- Magnitude of "phylogenetic signal" in physiological traits
- Role of pathogens and parasites in physiological evolution and immunity
- Application of optimality modeling to elucidate the degree of adaptation
- Role of phenotypic plasticity in accounting for individual, population, and species differences
- Mechanistic basis of trade-offs and constraints on evolution (e.g., putative Carrier's constraint on running and breathing)
- Limits on sustained metabolic rate
- Origin of allometric scaling relations or allometric laws (and the so-called metabolic theory of ecology)
- Individual variation (see also Individual differences psychology)
- Functional significance of biochemical polymorphisms
- Analysis of physiological variation via quantitative genetics
- Paleophysiology and the evolution of endothermy
- Human adaptational physiology
- Darwinian medicine
- Evolution of dietary antioxidants

== Techniques ==
- Artificial selection and experimental evolution mouse wheel running video
- Genetic analyses and manipulations
- Measurement of selection in the wild
- Phenotypic plasticity and manipulation
- Phylogenetically based comparisons
- Doubly labeled water measurements of free-living energy demands of animals

== Funding and societies ==
In the United States, research in evolutionary physiology is funded mainly by the National Science Foundation. A number of scientific societies feature sections that encompass evolutionary physiology, including:

- American Physiological Society "integrating the life sciences from molecule to organism"
- Society for Integrative and Comparative Biology
- Society for Experimental Biology

== Journals that frequently publish articles about evolutionary physiology ==
- American Naturalist
- Comparative Biochemistry and Physiology
- Comprehensive Physiology
- Ecology
- Evolution
- Functional Ecology
- Integrative and Comparative Biology
- Journal of Comparative Physiology
- Journal of Evolutionary Biochemistry and Physiology
- Journal of Evolutionary Biology
- Journal of Experimental Biology
- Ecological and Evolutionary Physiology (formerly Physiological and Biochemical Zoology)

== See also ==
- Allometry
- Allometric law
- Beneficial acclimation hypothesis
- Comparative physiology
- Darwinian medicine
- Field metabolic rate
- Ecophysiology
- Evolutionary neuroscience
- Evolutionary psychiatry
- Evolutionary psychology
- Experimental evolution
- Human physiology
- I. M. Sechenov Institute of Evolutionary Physiology and Biochemistry
- Kleiber's law
- Krogh Principle
- John Speakman
- Leon Orbeli
- Life history theory
- List of physiologists
- Metabolic theory of ecology
- Organismal performance
- Peter Hochachka
- Phenotypic plasticity
- Phylogenetic comparative methods
- Physiology
- Physiology of dinosaurs
- Raymond B. Huey
- Theodore Garland, Jr.
- Thrifty phenotype
