= Vladimir Govyrin =

Soviet and Russian physiologist

Vladimir Aleksandrovich Govyrin Владимир Александрович Говырин
- Born: February 22, 1924; Balashov, USSR
- Died: 5 February 1994 (aged 69); Saint Petersburg, Russia
- Education: Military Veterinary Academy of the Red Army
- Known for: Autonomic nervous system physiology research
- Awards: Order of Lenin, Order of October Revolution, Order of the Red Banner of Labour(2), Medal for Combat Service
- Scientific career
- Fields: Physiologist
- Workplaces: I. M. Sechenov Institute of Evolutionary Physiology and Biochemistry (1956—1981), I. P. Pavlov Institute of Physiology (1981—1994)
- Doctoral advisor: Leon Orbeli

Vladimir Aleksandrovich Govyrin (Russian: Владѝмир Алекса̀ндрович Говы̀рин, February 22, 1924, Balashov in Saratov Oblast, Soviet Union – February 5, 1994, Saint Petersburg, Russia) was a Soviet and Russian physiologist, Academician of Academy of Sciences of USSR and Russian Academy of Sciences, who discovered regularity of the sympathetic innervation of the circulatory system of the vertebrates. He offered the concept of universal participation of vascular nerves in humoral transfer of the sympathetic influence on tissue. He also discovered the method of sympathetic nervous system influences the skeletal muscle. Govyrin found out that sympathetic influences to skeletal tissue are made by catecholamines, emitted by vascular nerves.

== Biography ==
- 1924 was born in family of the teachers, Aleksandr Govyrin and Sarra Govyrina.
- 1941 joined the Physics and Mathematics Department of Balashov Teaching Institute.
- 1942 called up for service in the Army and sent to study in the Military Veterinary Academy of the Red Army.
- 1946 graduated from the Veterinary Academy, received an honours degree and continued his service as a border guard in Suoyarvi.
- 1953 having the rank of Major of veterinary service, he became the Candidate of Sciences in Biology.
- 1957 retired from the military service and joined Academician Leon Orbeli in his new I. M. Sechenov Institute of Evolutionary Physiology and Biochemistry (IEPHB).
- 1961 founded his own laboratory, which research goal was the adaptation-trophic function of the nervous system.
- 1968 got the academic degree of the Doctor of Sciences in Biology.
- 1975 became the Director of Institute of Evolutionary Physiology and Biochemistry.
- 1976 joined Academy of Sciences of the USSR as the Сorresponding Member.
- 1981 quit IEPHB and became the Director of I. M. Pavlov Institute of Physiology.
- 1984 became Academician of Academy of Sciences of the USSR.
- 1993 founded the I. M. Pavlov International Scientific Center.
- 1994 died at the age of 69.

== Honours and awards ==
- Order of Lenin
- Order of the October Revolution
- Order of the Red Banner of Labour, twice
- Medal "For Battle Merit"
