= Clifford Ladd Prosser =

American physiologist

- Born: May 12, 1907; Avon, New York
- Died: February 3, 2002 (aged 94); Urbana, Illinois
- Occupation: physiologist

Clifford Ladd Prosser (May 12, 1907 – February 3, 2002) was an American physiologist focused on research of comparative physiology of animals.

The American Physiological Society said "Ladd Prosser was among the few giants of comparative physiology in the second half of the twentieth century". He was a fellow of the American Academy of Arts and Sciences, a member of the National Academy of Sciences, a Guggenheim fellow, and a recipient of 50th Anniversary Award of the American Society of General Physiologists. He served as editor of the journal Physiological and Biochemical Zoology.
