= Stevan J. Arnold =

American evolutionary biologist

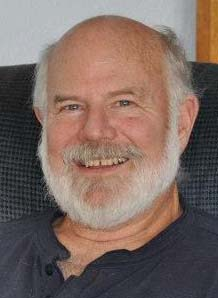
- Born: October 11, 1944 (age 82); Baltimore, Maryland, United States
- Spouse: Lynne Houck
- Children: Hilary and Laura

Academic background
- Education: BA; PhD
- Alma mater: University of California, Berkeley; University of Michigan, Ann Arbor
- Thesis: The Evolution of Courtship Behavior in Salamanders. Volumes I and II. (1972)

Stevan James Arnold (born 11 October 1944) is an American evolutionary biologist. He is Professor Emeritus of Integrative Biology and was Curator of Amphibians and Reptiles at Oregon State University, Corvallis until his retirement. He has served as president of the Society for the Study of Evolution and the American Society of Naturalists.

Arnold was elected a fellow of the Animal Behavior Society in 1992 and a fellow of the American Academy of Arts and Sciences in 2009. He has published over 150 peer-reviewed articles.

== Early life and education ==
Arnold was born in Baltimore, Maryland, on 11 October 1944, and grew up in southern California. He enrolled at the University of California, Berkeley in 1962, declared a major in Zoology and immediately began working in the herpetology laboratory at the Museum of Vertebrate Zoology, under the supervision of Robert Stebbins. Graduating from Berkeley in 1966, he took the Organization for Tropical Studies ecology course that summer and began graduate school in zoology at the University of Michigan in the fall. He studied the evolution of courtship behavior in salamanders for his doctoral dissertation, supervised by Arnold Kluge.

In 1971, he moved back to Berkeley to begin a Miller Postdoctoral Fellowship with David Wake, launching a new research program on the behavioral ecology of garter snakes.

He is the brother of former baseball player Christopher Arnold.

== Career ==
Arnold joined the faculty of the University of California, Santa Barbara in 1973. A year later he moved to the University of Chicago, where he was a faculty member for the next 23 years. During this period, he was especially influenced by his colleagues Michael Wade and Russell Lande as his interests moved in the direction of evolutionary quantitative genetics. Those interests continued to develop after he moved to Oregon State University in 1997 as chair of the Department of Zoology. That administrative work ended in 2002, and he became curator of the amphibians and reptiles in the Oregon State Natural History Collections.

Arnold served as the President of Society for the Study of Evolution in 1998, and of the American Society of Naturalists in 2012. He has been the Co-chair of OSU research collections since 1997, where he oversees and supervises research collections at OSU.

Arnold was an Associate Editor of Evolution from 1981 to 1983 and of Theoretical Population Biology from 1988 to 1991. From 2004 to 2009, he was the Director of Oregon State Arthropod Collection.

After his retirement he donated approximately 50,000 specimen snake and amphibian collection assembled with Lynne Houck to the University of Michigan Museum of Zoology.

== Work ==
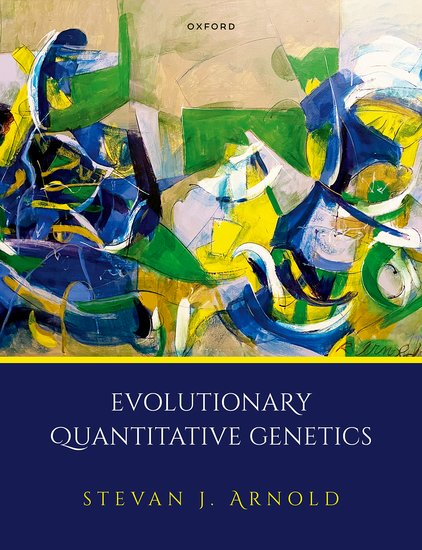
Book Cover

Arnold's work has been mainly focused in the field of evolutionary quantitative genetics, specifically on evolution of phenotypic traits (body size, morphology, behavior, whole organismal performance) that are affected by many genes. Arnold has also made key contributions to the understanding of how polygenic mutation and inheritance evolve. Those contributions as well as the field as whole are summarized in his book Evolutionary Quantitative Genetics which has a companion website.

Arnold has developed a variety of quantitative methods in evolutionary quantitative genetics. In 1983, he co-authored 'The Measurement of Selection on Correlated Characters', with Russell Lande. The paper has been cited over 6,000 times. He has also developed novel methods to characterize behavioral variation in natural populations, visualize selection surfaces, mathematically characterize mating systems, estimate and interpret sexual isolation, compare inheritance matrices, understand the evolution of quantitative inheritance, and analyze the process of adaptive radiation.

== Awards and honors ==
- 1981-1986 - NIH Research Career Development Award
- 1992 - Distinguished Herpetologist, Herpetologists League
- 1992 - Fellow, Animal Behavior Society
- 1992 - Walton Lecture, Mountain Lake Biological Station
- 1993 - Vice President, American Society of Naturalists
- 1995 - Fellows Lecture, Animal Behavior Society
- 1996 - Pettingill Lecture, University of Michigan
- 2003 - Donald W. Tinkle Memorial Lecture, University of Michigan
- 2003 - Distinguished Ecologist Lectures, Kellogg Biological Station
- 2005 - Gilfillan Memorial Award for Distinguished Scholarship in Science, Oregon State University
- 2008 - Henry S. Fitch Award for Excellence in Herpetology, American Society of Ichthyologists and Herpetologists
- 2009 - Fellow, American Academy of Arts & Sciences

== Selected articles ==
- Wade, M., & Arnold, S. J. (1980). The intensity of sexual selection in relation to male sexual behaviour, female choice, and sperm precedence. Animal Behaviour, 28(2), 446–461.
- Arnold, S. J. (1983). Morphology, Performance and Fitness. American Zoologist, 23(2), 347–361.
- Lande, R., & Arnold, S. J. (1983). The Measurement of Selection on Correlated Characters. Evolution, 37(6), 1210–1226.
- Arnold, S. J., & Wade, M. J. (1984). On the Measurement of Natural and Sexual Selection: Theory. Evolution, 38(4), 709–719.
- Price, T., Kirkpatrick, M., & Arnold, S. J. (1988). Directional selection and the evolution of breeding date in birds. Science, 240(4853), 798–799.
- Huey, R. B., Peterson, C. R., Arnold, S. J., & Porter, W. P. (1989). Hot Rocks and Not-So-Hot Rocks: Retreat-Site Selection by Garter Snakes and Its Thermal Consequences. Ecology, 70(4), 931–944.
- Phillips, P., & Arnold, S. (1989). Visualizing Multivariate Selection. Evolution, 43(6), 1209–1222.
- Arnold, S. J. (1992). Constraints on Phenotypic Evolution. The American Naturalist, 140, S85-S107
- Arnold, S. J., & Duvall, D. (1994). Animal Mating Systems: A Synthesis Based on Selection Theory. The American Naturalist, 143(2), 317–348.
