= Charlie Dunlop School of Biological Sciences =

Academic unit of the University of California, Irvine

UC Irvine Charlie Dunlop School of Biological Sciences
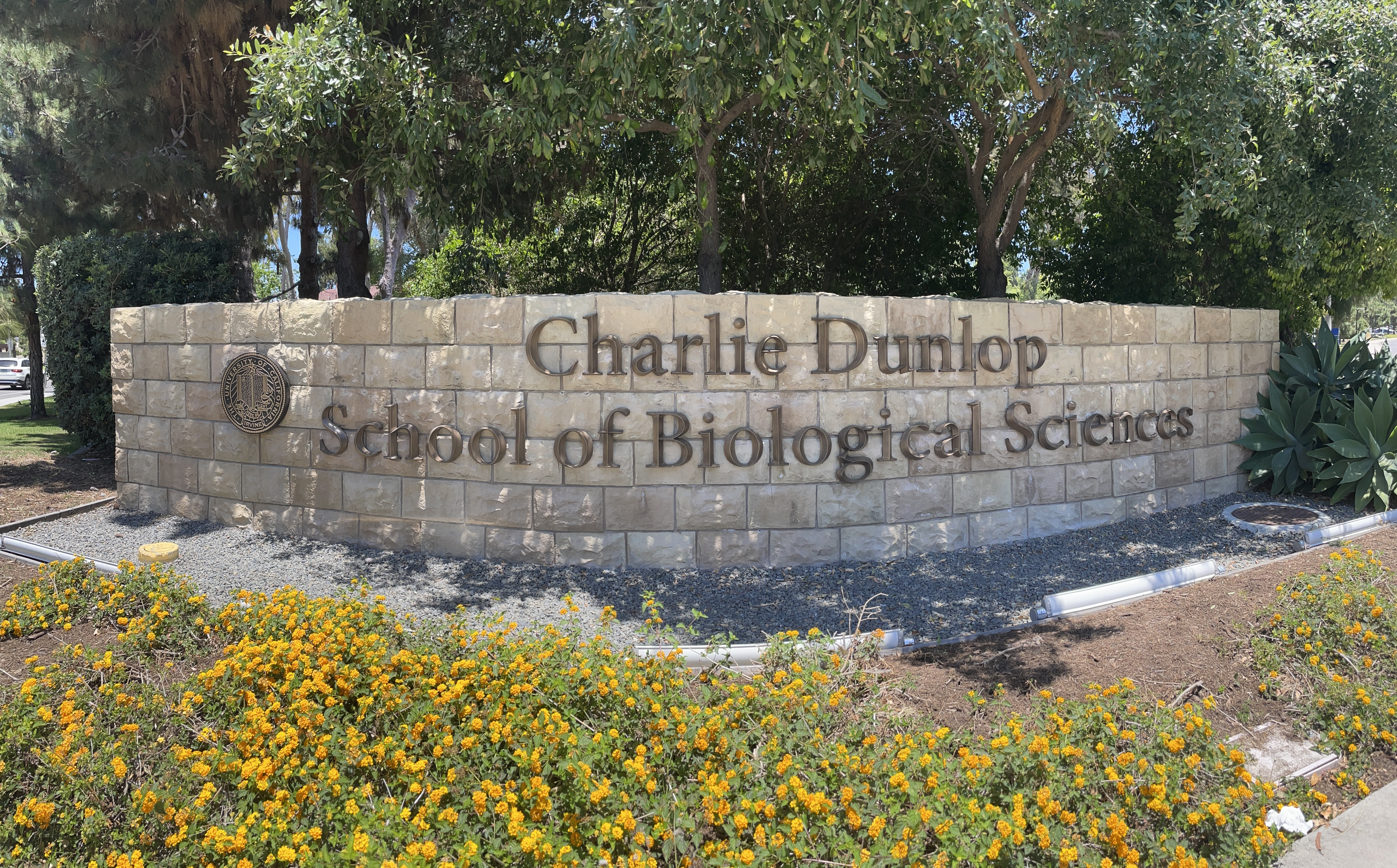
- Charlie Dunlop School of Biological Sciences monument sign
- Type: Public
- Established: 1965
- Affiliations: University of California, Irvine
- Dean: Frank M. LaFerla (2014 – Present)
- Location: 5120 Natural Sciences II, Irvine, California, 92697, United States; 33°38′39″N 117°50′43″W
- Website: www.bio.uci.edu

The UC Irvine Charlie Dunlop School of Biological Sciences (formerly the School of Biological Sciences) at the University of California, Irvine (UCI or UC Irvine) is one of the largest academic units at UCI devoted to research and education in the life sciences. The school was renamed in 2024 in recognition of a $50 million philanthropic gift from biotechnology entrepreneur Charlie Dunlop, founder of Ambry Genetics.

== History ==
The school was established in 1965, making it one of UCI’s original academic units. It initially consisted of four departments — Molecular & Cell Biology, Organismic Biology, Psychobiology, and Population & Environmental Biology — and 17 founding faculty members under the leadership of Edward A. Steinhaus, the school’s founding dean.

On March 12, 2014, the School was officially renamed after UCI professor and donor Francisco J. Ayala by then-Chancellor Michael V. Drake. Ayala had previously pledged to donate $10 million to the School of Biological Sciences in 2011. The school reverted to its previous name in June 2018, after a university investigation confirmed that Ayala had sexually harassed at least four women colleagues and graduate students.

On June 15, 2024, during the school's commencement ceremony, UCI announced that the school would be renamed the Charlie Dunlop School of Biological Sciences in recognition of a $50 million gift from biotech entrepreneur Charlie Dunlop, to create an endowed fund for unrestricted support of academic and research activities.

== Leadership ==
Since its founding, the school has been led by the following deans:

Dean	Years of Service
Edward A. Steinhaus	1963 – 1967
James L. McGaugh	1967 – 1970
Howard A. Schneiderman	1970 – 1979
Grover C. Stephens	1982 – 1986
L. Dennis Smith	1987 – 1990
Elvera Ehrenfeld	1992 – 1996
Shin Lin	1997 – 2000
Susan V. Bryant	2000 – 2006
Albert F. Bennet	2007 – 2013
Frank M. LaFerla	2014 – Present
