= Patricia Schulte =

Canadian zoologist

Patricia M. Schulte FRSC
- Education: Stanford University; University of British Columbia
- Scientific career
- Workplaces: University of British Columbia
- Thesis: The evolution of transcriptional regulation lactate dehydrogenase-b in fundulus heteroclitus (1996)

Patricia M. Schulte FRSC is a Canadian zoologist who is a Professor of Zoology at the University of British Columbia. Her research considers physiology, genomics and population genetics. Schulte is a Fellow of the Royal Society of Canada and the former President of the Canadian Society of Zoologists.

== Early life and education ==
Schulte completed her undergraduate studies at the University of British Columbia. She moved to Stanford University for her doctoral research, where she studied the regulation and function of transcriptional Lactate dehydrogenase b in Fundulus heteroclitus.

== Research and career ==
Schulte is an evolutionary physiologist who studies how changes in the environment impact fish. Schulte has studied the killifish common to the East Coast of Canada. These fish experience extreme coastal gradients, significantly more than their North American counterparts. These changes in temperature have marked impact on the physiology and behaviour of killifish.

Schulte has also studied rainbow trout and the impact of human activity. She has investigated the genetic variants that leave certain rainbow trout susceptible to climate-change relevant stressors. Her research has informed guidance on rainbow trout conservation and the operation of fisheries. Three-spined stickleback exist in both freshwater and marine environments, and the two forms come into contact in the streams of British Columbia. Schulte has investigated how the sticklebacks adapt to new environments, such as changes in salinity, temperature or the types of predators.

Schulte is committed to educational research. She has been awarded the UBC Science Undergraduate Society Awards for Excellence in Teaching. She serves executive team of the Carl Wieman Science Education Initiative.

== Awards and honours ==
- 2007 President of the Canadian Society of Zoologists
- 2015 Peter Wall Institute for Advanced Studies Peter Wall Scholar
- 2016 American Fisheries Society Award for Excellence
- 2019 Elected Fellow of the Royal Society of Canada
- 2019 University of British Columbia Killam Research Prize

== Selected publications ==
- N Basu; A E Todgham; P A Ackerman; M R Bibeau; K Nakano; P M Schulte; George K Iwama (1 August 2002). "Heat shock protein genes and their functional significance in fish". Gene. 295 (2): 173–183. doi:10.1016/s0378-1119(02)00687-x. ISSN 0378-1119. PMID 12354651. Wikidata Q34922408.
- Nann A Fangue; Myriam Hofmeister; Patricia M. Schulte (1 August 2006). "Intraspecific variation in thermal tolerance and heat shock protein gene expression in common killifish, Fundulus heteroclitus". The Journal of Experimental Biology. 209 (Pt 15): 2859–2872. doi:10.1242/jeb.02260. ISSN 0022-0949. PMID 16857869. Wikidata Q79954831.
- Patricia M Schulte; Timothy M Healy; Nann A Fangue (13 August 2011). "Thermal performance curves, phenotypic plasticity, and the time scales of temperature exposure". Integrative and Comparative Biology. 51 (5): 691–702. doi:10.1093/icb/icr097. ISSN 1540-7063. PMID 21841184. Wikidata Q53767049.
- Moyes, Christopher D.; Schulte, Patricia (2006). Principles of animal physiology. San Francisco: Pearson Benjamin Cummings. ISBN 0-8053-5351-8. OCLC 61497840.
