= Comprehensive Physiology =

- Discipline: Physiology
- Language: English
- Edited by: Dr. J. Usha Raj, MD, MHA

Publication details
- Publisher: John Wiley & Sons on behalf of the American Physiological Society (United States)
- Frequency: Bi-Monthly
- Open access: Hybrid

Standard abbreviations
- ISO 4: Compr. Physiol.

Indexing
- ISSN: 2040-4603

Links
- Journal homepage; View All Issues

Comprehensive Physiology is a peer-reviewed scientific journal published by John Wiley & Sons on behalf of the American Physiological Society.

The journal was relaunched in 2025 to include research articles, reviews, and editorials. Now, Comprehensive Physiology publishes articles in the interdisciplinary field of inter-organ communication in health and disease. Example topics include inter-organ cellular communication, signaling pathways, organ crosstalk, systems biology, inter-organ pathology and pathogenesis, and the role of hormones and neurotransmitters. The journal provides essential insights for developing interventions and treatments.

Previously, the journal consisted of invited review articles, published in quarterly issues, and includes over 30,000 pages of the APS's Handbook of Physiology series of books, scanned and presented online for the first time.

The journal is indexed in PubMed, and Web of Knowledge.
