= Carrier's constraint =

Movement that makes breathing difficult

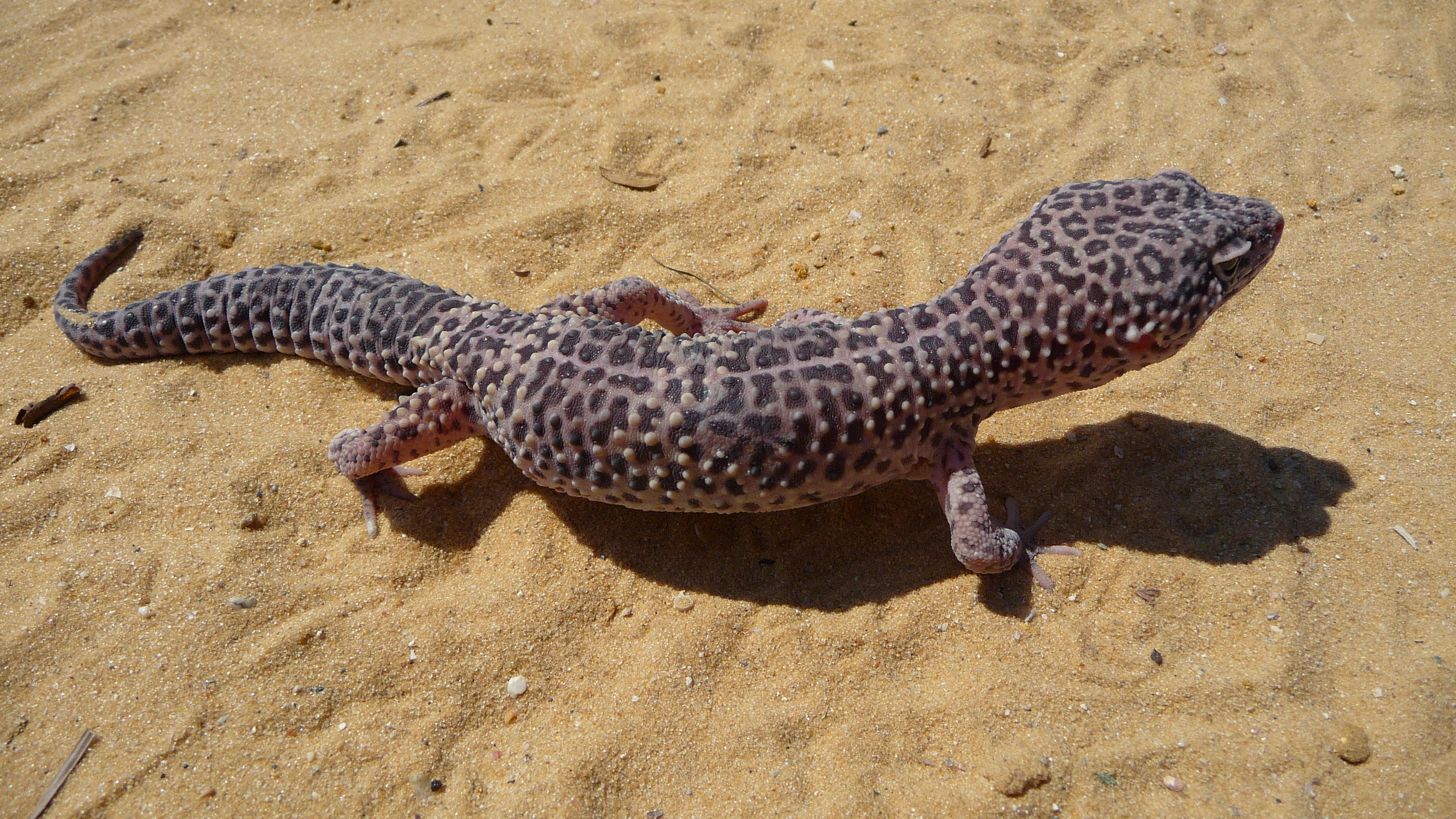
Common leopard gecko

Carrier's constraint is the observation that air-breathing vertebrates with two lungs that flex their bodies sideways during locomotion find it difficult to move and breathe at the same time, because the sideways flexing expands one lung and compresses the other, shunting stale air from lung to lung instead of expelling it completely to make room for fresh air.

It was named by English paleontologist Richard Cowen for David R. Carrier, who wrote his observations on the problem in 1987.

== Consequences ==
Most lizards move in short bursts, with long pauses for breath.

Around the Late Triassic period, animals with Carrier's constraint were preyed on by bipedal species that evolved a more efficient stride.

== Solutions ==
=== Workarounds ===
Most snakes have only one lung, so Carrier's constraint does not apply.

Monitor lizards increase their stamina by using bones and muscles in the throat and floor of the mouth to "gulp" air via gular pumping.

Some other lizards, mainly agamids, use bipedal locomotion for running and avoid sideways flexing. Bipedality in modern lizards is rare, but it is an effective way to run without pausing to breathe, and is advantageous for catching active prey or evading predators.

Crocodilians use a "high walk" with a more erect limb posture that minimizes sideways flexing to cross long distances. However, as they evolved from upright walkers with limited bipedality, this may simply be a remnant of past behavior rather than a specific adaptation to overcome this difficulty. Todd J. Uriona of the University of Utah hypothesized that costal ventilation may have aided the upright posture in overcoming the constraint.

=== Avoiding the constraint ===
Birds have erect limbs and rigid bodies, and therefore do not flex sideways when moving. In addition many of them have a mechanism which pumps both lungs simultaneously when the birds rock their hips.

Most mammals have erect limbs and flexible bodies, which makes their bodies flex vertically when moving quickly. This aids breathing, as it expands or compresses both lungs simultaneously.

== Contrary evidence ==
Contrary to the above model, breathing is maintained in lizards during movement, even above their aerobic scope, and arterial blood remains well oxygenated.

== In popular culture ==
Paleontologist Richard Cowen wrote a limerick to explain and celebrate Carrier's rule:

The reptilian idea of fun
Is to bask all day in the sun.
A physiological barrier,
Discovered by Carrier,
Says they can't breathe, if they run.

== See also ==
- Evolutionary physiology
- Trade-off
