= Krogh length =

Distance nutrients diffuse between capillaries

The Krogh Length, $\lambda_K$, is the distance to which nutrients diffuse between capillaries, based on cellular consumption of the nutrients.

It can be described as:

$\lambda_K = \sqrt{D_s c_o/R}$

where $D_s$ is the diffusion constant of the solute in the substrate, $c_o$ is the concentration in the channel, and $R$ is the consumption by the cells. Units are in terms of length.

== See also ==
- August Krogh
- Biomedical engineering
- Capillaries
- Diffusion
- Biot number
- Peclet number
