= Comparative physiology =

Study of the diversity of functional characteristics of organisms

Comparative physiology is a subdiscipline of physiology that studies and exploits the diversity of functional characteristics of various kinds of organisms. It is closely related to evolutionary physiology and environmental physiology. Many universities offer undergraduate courses that cover comparative aspects of animal physiology. According to Clifford Ladd Prosser, "Comparative Physiology is not so much a defined discipline as a viewpoint, a philosophy."

== History ==
Originally, as narrated in a recent history of the field, physiology focused primarily on human beings, in large part from a desire to improve medical practices. When physiologists first began comparing different species it was sometimes out of simple curiosity to understand how organisms work but also stemmed from a desire to discover basic physiological principles. This use of specific organisms convenient to study specific questions is known as the Krogh Principle.

== Methodology ==
C. Ladd Prosser, a founder of modern comparative physiology, outlined a broad agenda for comparative physiology in his 1950 edited volume (see summary and discussion in Garland and Carter):

1. To describe how different kinds of animals meet their needs.

This amounts to cataloging functional aspects of biological diversity, and has recently been criticized as "stamp collecting" with the suggestion that the field should move beyond that initial, exploratory phase.

2. The use of physiological information to reconstruct phylogenetic relationships of organisms.

In principle physiological information could be used just as morphological information or DNA sequence is used to measure evolutionary divergence of organisms. In practice, this has rarely been done, for at least four reasons:
- physiology doesn't leave many fossil cues,
- it can't be measured on museum specimens,
- it is difficult to quantify as compared with morphology or DNA sequences, and
- physiology is more likely to be adaptive than DNA, and so subject to parallel and convergent evolution, which confuses phylogenetic reconstruction.

3. To elucidate how physiology mediates interactions between organisms and their environments.

This is essentially physiological ecology or ecological physiology.

4. To identify "model systems" for studying particular physiological functions.

Examples of this include using squid giant axons to understand general principles of nerve transmission, using rattlesnake tail shaker muscles for measurement of in vivo changes in metabolites (because the whole animal can be put in an NMR machine), and the use of ectothermic poikilotherms to study effects of temperature on physiology.

5. To use the "kind of animal" as an experimental variable.

"While other branches of physiology use such variables as light, temperature, oxygen tension, and hormone balance, comparative physiology uses, in addition, species or animal type as a variable for each function."
25 years later, Prosser put things this way: "I like to think of it as that method in physiology which uses kind of organism as one experimental variable."

Comparative physiologists often study organisms that live in "extreme" environments (e.g., deserts) because they expect to find especially clear examples of evolutionary adaptation. One example is the study of water balance in desert-inhabiting mammals, which have been found to exhibit kidney specializations.

Similarly, comparative physiologists have been attracted to "unusual" organisms, such as very large or small ones. As an example, of the latter, hummingbirds have been studied. As another example, giraffe have been studied because of their long necks and the expectation that this would lead to specializations related to the regulation of blood pressure. More generally, ectothermic vertebrates have been studied to determine how blood acid-base balance and pH change as body temperature changes.

== Funding ==
In the United States, research in comparative physiology is funded by both the National Institutes of Health and the National Science Foundation.

== Societies ==
A number of scientific societies feature sections on comparative physiology, including:

- American Physiological Society
- Australian & New Zealand Society for Comparative Physiology & Biochemistry
- Canadian Society of Zoologists
- Japanese Society for Comparative Physiology and Biochemistry
- Society for Integrative and Comparative Biology
- Society for Experimental Biology

== Some journals that publish articles in comparative animal physiology ==
- American Journal of Physiology - Regulatory, Integrative and Comparative Physiology
- Annual Review of Physiology
- Comparative Biochemistry and Physiology
- Ecological and Evolutionary Physiology (formerly Physiological and Biochemical Zoology)
- Integrative and Comparative Biology
- Journal of Comparative Physiology
- Journal of Experimental Biology

== See also ==
* Comparative anatomy
- Ecophysiology
- Human physiology
- Krogh Principle
- Phylogenetic comparative methods
