= American Physiological Society =

Non-profit professional society for physiologists

The American Physiological Society is a non-profit professional society for physiologists. It has nearly 10,000 members, most of whom hold doctoral degrees in medicine, physiology, or other health professions. Its mission is to support research and education in the physiological sciences. The society publishes 16 peer-reviewed journals, sponsors scientific conferences, and sponsors awards to further this mission.

== Governance ==
Since it was founded in 1887, APS has had many notable scientists lead the organization, beginning with founder Henry Bowditch and continuing through its current president. APS is governed by an elected Board of Directors. The Board includes a president, immediate past president and president-elect, each serving a one-year term. Management of the affairs of the society is the responsibility of a full-time chief executive officer, who serves as secretary of the board. The society maintains a staff and offices in Rockville, Maryland.

== History and activity ==
The American Physiological Society was founded in 1887 with 28 members. Of them, 21 were graduates of medical schools, but only 12 had studied in institutions with a physiology professor.

The American Physiological Society was founded at a time when very few physiological laboratories existed in the United States and there were few investigators. The newly established society was one of the earliest national disciplinary societies in the sciences, the first society in the biomedical sciences, and likely the first to require its members to publish original research. The stated object of the society was to promote the advancement of physiology and to facilitate discourse among American physiologists. There was a conscious effort to ensure the representation of all areas within physiology, encompassing topics as diverse as neurology, psychology, ophthalmology, pathology and therapeutics, as well as plant physiology and animal biology.

The APS recognizes five physiologists as its founders: Henry Pickering Bowditch, Silas Weir Mitchell, and Henry Newell Martin co-signed the original letter to active physiology researchers inviting them to the new society, and John Green Curtis and Russell Henry Chittenden provided early organizational support. The organizational meeting founding the society was held on December 30, 1887, in Curtis' laboratory space at Columbia University and was attended by seventeen people. The society had 28 founding members. The first regular meeting of the APS followed in September 1888 in Washington, DC, featuring paper presentations and demonstrations.

In its early days the APS served a young field with relatively few dedicated researchers, so its efforts were oriented toward advancing teaching and research. APS members collaborated to author a textbook of physiology and launched a journal, the American Journal of Physiology, in 1898. As the field of physiology matured, the society expanded in membership.

The modern APS sponsors many awards, including the Horace W. Davenport Distinguished Lecturer, the Walter B. Cannon Award, and Arthur C. Guyton Award, and the Henry Pickering Bowditch Award.

== Publications ==
The American Physiological Society publishes peer-reviewed journals and books as a nonprofit publisher.

- Function is an open access journal that publishes original articles that contribute to defining the mechanistic basis of living systems in health and disease and extending the physiological understanding of biological function.
- The American Journal of Physiology – Cell Physiology is dedicated to innovative approaches to the study of cell and molecular physiology.
- The American Journal of Physiology – Endocrinology and Metabolism publishes original, mechanistic studies on the physiology of endocrine and metabolic systems.
- The American Journal of Physiology – Gastrointestinal and Liver Physiology publishes original articles pertaining to all aspects of research involving function of the gastrointestinal tract, hepatobiliary system and pancreas.
- The American Journal of Physiology – Heart and Circulatory Physiology focuses on the physiology of the heart, blood vessels and lymphatics, including experimental and theoretical studies of cardiovascular function at all levels.
- The American Journal of Physiology – Lung Cellular and Molecular Physiology covers molecular, cellular and integrative aspects of normal and abnormal function of cells and components of the respiratory system.
- The American Journal of Physiology – Regulatory, Integrative and Comparative Physiology highlights regulation and integration of physiological mechanism at all levels of biological organizations, ranging from molecules to humans.
- The American Journal of Physiology – Renal Physiology is dedicated to a broad range of subjects relating to the kidney, urinary tract, and their respective cells and vasculature.
- Physiological Genomics publishes the results of a wide variety of experimental and computational studies from human and model systems to link genes and pathways to physiological functions.
- Journal of Applied Physiology deals with research in applied physiology, especially adaptive and integrative mechanisms.
- Journal of Neurophysiology includes articles on all levels of function of the nervous system, from the membrane and cell to systems and behavior.
- Physiological Reviews provides coverage of timely issues in the physiological and biomedical sciences.
- Physiology publishes invited review articles written by leaders in their fields.
- Advances in Physiology Education promotes educational scholarship in order to enhance teaching and learning of physiology, neuroscience and pathophysiology.
- Physiological Reports, a collaboration between The Physiological Society and the American Physiological Society, is an online only, open access journal that publishes peer reviewed research across all areas of basic, translational, and clinical physiology and allied disciplines.
- Comprehensive Physiology is an online publication that includes complete content from the landmark Handbook of Physiology series. It is continually expanded through quarterly updates and directed by an editorial advisory board. It is published on behalf of the American Physiological Society by Wiley-Blackwell.

== Sections ==
Members can affiliate with one of twelve disciplinary sections composed of members that share a common interest. The sections are Cardiovascular, Cell and Molecular Physiology, Central Nervous System, Comparative and Evolutionary Physiology, Endocrinology and Metabolism, Environmental and Exercise Physiology, Gastrointestinal and Liver Physiology, Neural Control and Autonomic Regulation, Renal Physiology, Respiration, Teaching of Physiology and Water and Electrolyte Homeostasis. Each member is asked to designate one primary, and two secondary section affiliations. Sections have their own internal governance.

== Membership ==
The APS has a variety of membership categories. Regular membership is for individuals conducting original research in physiology. Affiliate membership is for individuals interested in physiology but without the evidence of scholarly work. Graduate Student membership is for any student engaged in physiological work that will culminate in a doctoral degree. Undergraduate Student membership is for individuals working toward an undergraduate degree that will eventually lead to work in physiology or a related field.

== Committees ==
The American Physiological Society provides its membership with opportunities to be involved with the society through service on its various committees. Currently, the society offers 18 committees for members to get involved in, ranging in topics from science policy to publications.

== Meetings ==
In 2023, APS launched its annual meeting, the American Physiology Summit, which convenes thousands of life science researchers and biomedical scientists, educators and students from around the world. This meeting features keynotes plenary, award lectures, symposia, oral and poster sessions, and an exhibit of scientific equipment, supplies, and publications.
