= Ecophysiology =

Study of adaptation of an organism's physiology to environmental conditions

Ecophysiology (from Greek οἶκος, oikos, "house(hold)"; φύσις, physis, "nature, origin"; and -λογία, -logia), environmental physiology or physiological ecology is a biological discipline that studies the response of an organism's physiology to environmental conditions. It is closely related to comparative physiology and evolutionary physiology. Ernst Haeckel's coinage bionomy is sometimes employed as a synonym.

== Plants ==
Plant ecophysiology is concerned largely with two topics: mechanisms (how plants sense and respond to environmental change) and scaling or integration (how the responses to highly variable conditions—for example, gradients from full sunlight to 95% shade within tree canopies—are coordinated with one another), and how their collective effect on plant growth and gas exchange can be understood on this basis.

In many cases, animals are able to escape unfavourable and changing environmental factors such as heat, cold, drought or floods, while plants are unable to move away and therefore must endure the adverse conditions or perish (animals go places, plants grow places). Plants are therefore phenotypically plastic and have an impressive array of genes that aid in acclimating to changing conditions. It is hypothesized that this large number of genes can be partly explained by plant species' need to live in a wider range of conditions.

=== Light ===
Light is the food of plants, i.e. the form of energy that plants use to build themselves and reproduce. The organs harvesting light in plants are leaves and the process through which light is converted into biomass is photosynthesis. The response of photosynthesis to light is called light response curve of net photosynthesis (PI curve). The shape is typically described by a non-rectangular hyperbola. Three quantities of the light response curve are particularly useful in characterising a plant's response to light intensities. The inclined asymptote has a positive slope representing the efficiency of light use, and is called quantum efficiency; the x-intercept is the light intensity at which biochemical assimilation (gross assimilation) balances leaf respiration so that the net CO_{2} exchange of the leaf is zero, called light compensation point; and a horizontal asymptote representing the maximum assimilation rate. Sometimes after reaching the maximum assimilation declines for processes collectively known as photoinhibition.

As with most abiotic factors, light intensity (irradiance) can be both suboptimal and excessive. Suboptimal light (shade) typically occurs at the base of a plant canopy or in an understory environment. Shade tolerant plants have a range of adaptations to help them survive the altered quantity and quality of light typical of shade environments.

Excess light occurs at the top of canopies and on open ground when cloud cover is low and the sun's zenith angle is low, typically this occurs in the tropics and at high altitudes. Excess light incident on a leaf can result in photoinhibition and photodestruction. Plants adapted to high light environments have a range of adaptations to avoid or dissipate the excess light energy, as well as mechanisms that reduce the amount of injury caused.

Light intensity is also an important component in determining the temperature of plant organs (energy budget).

=== Temperature ===
In response to extremes of temperature, plants can produce various proteins. These protect them from the damaging effects of ice formation and falling rates of enzyme catalysis at low temperatures, and from enzyme denaturation and increased photorespiration at high temperatures. As temperatures fall, production of antifreeze proteins and dehydrins increases. As temperatures rise, production of heat shock proteins increases. Metabolic imbalances associated with temperature extremes result in the build-up of reactive oxygen species, which can be countered by antioxidant systems. Cell membranes are also affected by changes in temperature and can cause the membrane to lose its fluid properties and become a gel in cold conditions or to become leaky in hot conditions. This can affect the movement of compounds across the membrane. To prevent these changes, plants can change the composition of their membranes. In cold conditions, more unsaturated fatty acids are placed in the membrane and in hot conditions, more saturated fatty acids are inserted.

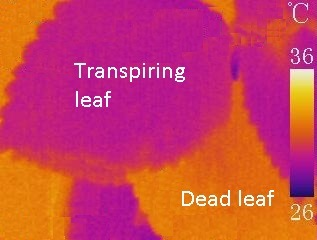
Infrared image showing the importance of transpiration in keeping leaves cool.

Plants can avoid overheating by minimising the amount of sunlight absorbed and by enhancing the cooling effects of wind and transpiration. Plants can reduce light absorption using reflective leaf hairs, scales, and waxes. These features are so common in warm dry regions that these habitats can be seen to form a 'silvery landscape' as the light scatters off the canopies. Some species, such as Macroptilium purpureum, can move their leaves throughout the day so that they are always orientated to avoid the sun (paraheliotropism). Knowledge of these mechanisms has been key to breeding for heat stress tolerance in agricultural plants.

Plants can avoid the full impact of low temperatures by altering their microclimate. For example, Raoulia plants found in the uplands of New Zealand are said to resemble 'vegetable sheep' as they form tight cushion-like clumps to insulate the most vulnerable plant parts and shield them from cooling winds. The same principle has been applied in agriculture by using plastic mulch to insulate the growing points of crops in cool climates in order to boost plant growth.

=== Water ===
Too much or too little water can damage plants. If there is too little water then tissues will dehydrate and the plant may die. If the soil becomes waterlogged then the soil will become anoxic (low in oxygen), which can kill the roots of the plant.

The ability of plants to access water depends on the structure of their roots and on the water potential of the root cells. When soil water content is low, plants can alter their water potential to maintain a flow of water into the roots and up to the leaves (Soil plant atmosphere continuum). This remarkable mechanism allows plants to lift water as high as 120 m by harnessing the gradient created by transpiration from the leaves.

In very dry soil, plants close their stomata to reduce transpiration and prevent water loss. The closing of the stomata is often mediated by chemical signals from the root (i.e., abscisic acid). In irrigated fields, the fact that plants close their stomata in response to drying of the roots can be exploited to 'trick' plants into using less water without reducing yields (see partial rootzone drying). The use of this technique was largely developed by Dr Peter Dry and colleagues in Australia.

If drought continues, the plant tissues will dehydrate, resulting in a loss of turgor pressure that is visible as wilting. As well as closing their stomata, most plants can also respond to drought by altering their water potential (osmotic adjustment) and increasing root growth. Plants that are adapted to dry environments (Xerophytes) have a range of more specialized mechanisms to maintain water and/or protect tissues when desiccation occurs.

Waterlogging reduces the supply of oxygen to the roots and can kill a plant within days. Plants cannot avoid waterlogging, but many species overcome the lack of oxygen in the soil by transporting oxygen to the root from tissues that are not submerged. Species that are tolerant of waterlogging develop specialised roots near the soil surface and aerenchyma to allow the diffusion of oxygen from the shoot to the root. Roots that are not killed outright may also switch to less oxygen-hungry forms of cellular respiration. Species that are frequently submerged have evolved more elaborate mechanisms that maintain root oxygen levels, such as the aerial roots seen in mangrove forests.

However, for many terminally overwatered houseplants, the initial symptoms of waterlogging can resemble those due to drought. This is particularly true for flood-sensitive plants that show drooping of their leaves due to epinasty (rather than wilting).

=== CO_{2} concentration ===
CO_{2} is vital for plant growth, as it is the substrate for photosynthesis. Plants take in CO_{2} through stomatal pores on their leaves. At the same time as CO_{2} enters the stomata, moisture escapes. This trade-off between CO_{2} gain and water loss is central to plant productivity. The trade-off is all the more critical as Rubisco, the enzyme used to capture CO_{2}, is efficient only when there is a high concentration of CO_{2} in the leaf. Some plants overcome this difficulty by concentrating CO_{2} within their leaves using C_{4} carbon fixation or Crassulacean acid metabolism. However, most species used C_{3} carbon fixation and must open their stomata to take in CO_{2} whenever photosynthesis is taking place.

Plant Productivity in a Warming World

The concentration of CO_{2} in the atmosphere is rising due to deforestation and the combustion of fossil fuels. This would be expected to increase the efficiency of photosynthesis and possibly increase the overall rate of plant growth. This possibility has attracted considerable interest in recent years, as an increased rate of plant growth could absorb some of the excess CO_{2} and reduce the rate of global warming. Extensive experiments growing plants under elevated CO_{2} using Free-Air Concentration Enrichment have shown that photosynthetic efficiency does indeed increase. Plant growth rates also increase, by an average of 17% for above-ground tissue and 30% for below-ground tissue. However, detrimental impacts of global warming, such as increased instances of heat and drought stress, mean that the overall effect is likely to be a reduction in plant productivity. Reduced plant productivity would be expected to accelerate the rate of global warming. Overall, these observations point to the importance of avoiding further increases in atmospheric CO_{2} rather than risking runaway climate change.

=== Wind ===
Wind has three very different effects on plants.

- It affects the exchanges of mass (water evaporation, CO_{2}) and of energy (heat) between the plant and the atmosphere by renewing the air at the contact with the leaves (convection).
- It is sensed as a signal driving a wind-acclimation syndrome by the plant known as thigmomorphogenesis, leading to modified growth and development and eventually to wind hardening.
- Its drag force can damage the plant (leaf abrasion, wind ruptures in branches and stems and windthrows and toppling in trees and lodging in crops).

==== Exchange of mass and energy ====
Wind influences the way leaves regulate moisture, heat, and carbon dioxide. When no wind is present, a layer of still air builds up around each leaf. This is known as the boundary layer and in effect insulates the leaf from the environment, providing an atmosphere rich in moisture and less prone to convective heating or cooling. As wind speed increases, the leaf environment becomes more closely linked to the surrounding environment. It may become difficult for the plant to retain moisture as it is exposed to dry air. On the other hand, a moderately high wind allows the plant to cool its leaves more easily when exposed to full sunlight. Plants are not entirely passive in their interaction with wind. Plants can make their leaves less vulnerable to changes in wind speed, by coating their leaves in fine hairs (trichomes) to break up the airflow and increase the boundary layer. In fact, leaf and canopy dimensions are often finely controlled to manipulate the boundary layer depending on the prevailing environmental conditions.

==== Acclimation ====
Plants can sense the wind through the deformation of its tissues. This signal leads to inhibits the elongation and stimulates the radial expansion of their shoots, while increasing the development of their root system. This syndrome of responses known as thigmomorphogenesis results in shorter, stockier plants with strengthened stems, as well as to an improved anchorage. It was once believed that this occurs mostly in very windy areas. But it has been found that it happens even in areas with moderate winds, so that wind-induced signal were found to be a major ecological factor.

Trees have a particularly well-developed capacity to reinforce their trunks when exposed to wind. From the practical side, this realisation prompted arboriculturalists in the UK in the 1960s to move away from the practice of staking young amenity trees to offer artificial support.

==== Wind damage ====
Wind can damage most of the organs of the plants. Leaf abrasion (due to the rubbing of leaves and branches or to the effect of airborne particles such as sand) and leaf of branch breakage are rather common phenomena, that plants have to accommodate. In the more extreme cases, plants can be mortally damaged or uprooted by wind. This has been a major selective pressure acting over terrestrial plants. Nowadays, it is one of the major threatening for agriculture and forestry even in temperate zones. It is worse for agriculture in hurricane-prone regions, such as the banana-growing Windward Islands in the Caribbean.

When this type of disturbance occurs in natural systems, the only solution is to ensure that there is an adequate stock of seeds or seedlings to quickly take the place of the mature plants that have been lost- although, in many cases, a successional stage will be needed before the ecosystem can be restored to its former state.

== Animals ==
=== Humans ===
The environment can have major influences on human physiology. Environmental effects on human physiology are numerous; one of the most carefully studied effects is the alterations in thermoregulation in the body due to outside stresses. This is necessary because in order for enzymes to function, blood to flow, and for various body organs to operate, temperature must remain at consistent, balanced levels.

==== Thermoregulation ====
To achieve this, the body alters three main things to achieve a constant, normal body temperature:

- Heat transfer to the epidermis
- The rate of evaporation
- The rate of heat production

The hypothalamus plays an important role in thermoregulation. It connects to thermal receptors in the dermis, and detects changes in surrounding blood to make decisions of whether to stimulate internal heat production or to stimulate evaporation.

There are two main types of stresses that can be experienced due to extreme environmental temperatures: heat stress and cold stress.

Heat stress is physiologically combated in four ways: radiation, conduction, convection, and evaporation. Cold stress is physiologically combated by shivering, accumulation of body fat, circulatory adaptations (that provide an efficient transfer of heat to the epidermis), and increased blood flow to the extremities.

There is one part of the body fully equipped to deal with cold stress. The respiratory system protects itself against damage by warming the incoming air to 80–90 degrees Fahrenheit before it reaches the bronchi. This means that not even the most frigid of temperatures can damage the respiratory tract.

In both types of temperature-related stress, it is important to remain well-hydrated. Hydration reduces cardiovascular strain, enhances the ability of energy processes to occur, and reduces feelings of exhaustion.

==== Altitude ====
Extreme temperatures are not the only obstacles that humans face. High altitudes also pose serious physiological challenges on the body. Some of these effects are reduced arterial $P_{{\mathrm{O}}_2}$, the rebalancing of the acid-base content in body fluids, increased hemoglobin, increased RBC synthesis, enhanced circulation, and increased levels of the glycolysis byproduct 2,3 diphosphoglycerate, which promotes off-loading of O_{2} by hemoglobin in the hypoxic tissues.

Environmental factors can play a huge role in the human body's fight for homeostasis. However, humans have found ways to adapt, both physiologically and tangibly.

=== Scientists ===
George A. Bartholomew (1919–2006) was a founder of animal physiological ecology. He served on the faculty at UCLA from 1947 to 1989, and almost 1,200 individuals can trace their academic lineages to him. Knut Schmidt-Nielsen (1915–2007) was also an important contributor to this specific scientific field as well as comparative physiology.

Hermann Rahn (1912–1990) was an early leader in the field of environmental physiology. Starting out in the field of zoology with a Ph.D. from University of Rochester (1933), Rahn began teaching physiology at the University of Rochester in 1941. It is there that he partnered with Wallace O. Fenn to publish A Graphical Analysis of the Respiratory Gas Exchange in 1955. This paper included the landmark O_{2}-CO_{2} diagram, which formed the basis for much of Rahn's future work. Rahn's research into applications of this diagram led to the development of aerospace medicine and advancements in hyperbaric breathing and high-altitude respiration. Rahn later joined the University at Buffalo in 1956 as the Lawrence D. Bell Professor and Chairman of the Department of Physiology. As Chairman, Rahn surrounded himself with outstanding faculty and made the University an international research center in environmental physiology.

== See also ==
- Comparative physiology
- Evolutionary physiology
- Ecology
- Phylogenetic comparative methods
- Plant physiology
- Raymond B. Huey
- Theodore Garland, Jr.
- Tyrone Hayes
