= Tropism =

Directed growth of an organism in response to environmental stimuli

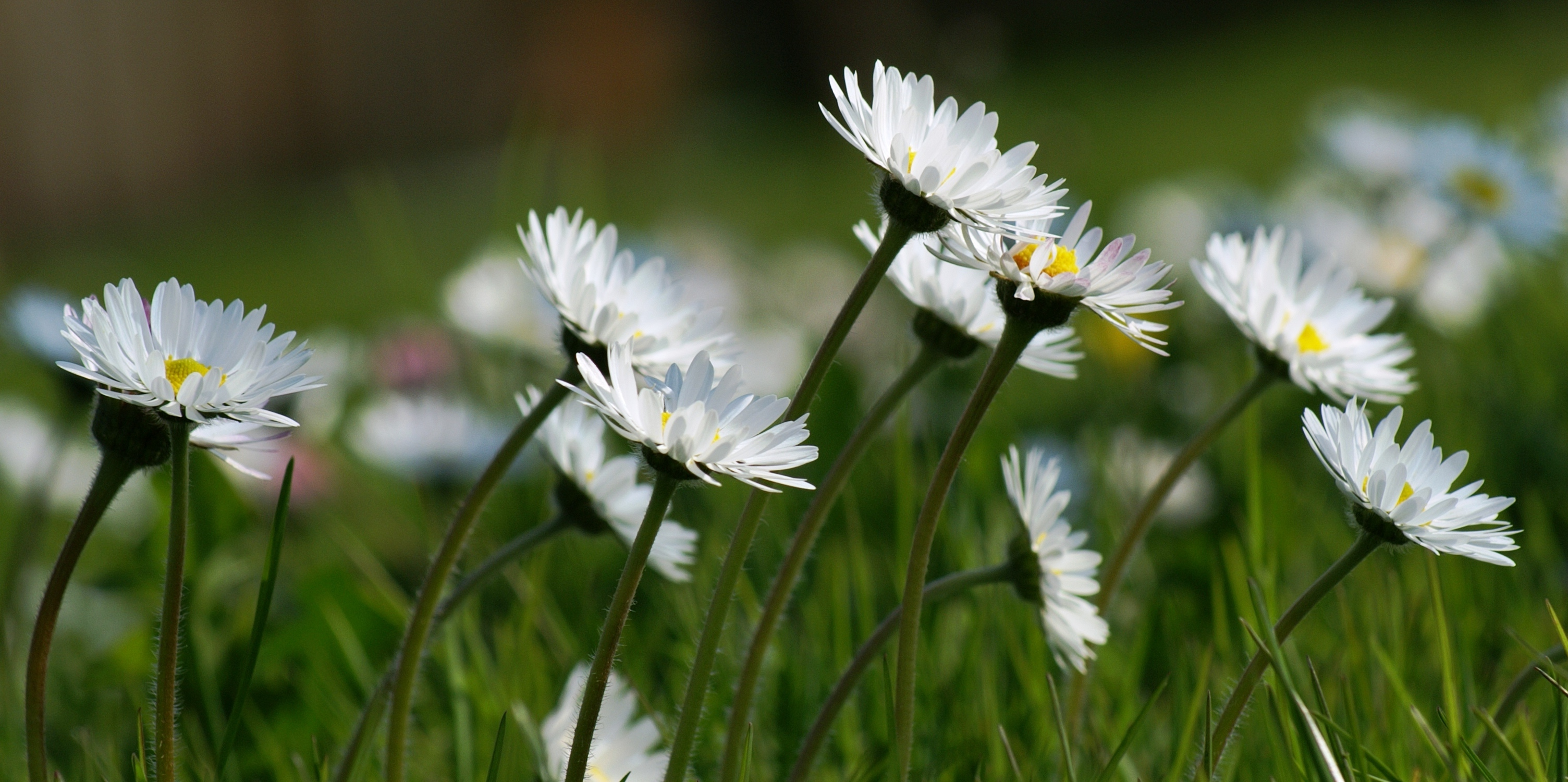
Daisies (Bellis perennis) facing the Sun after opening in the morning showing heliotropism

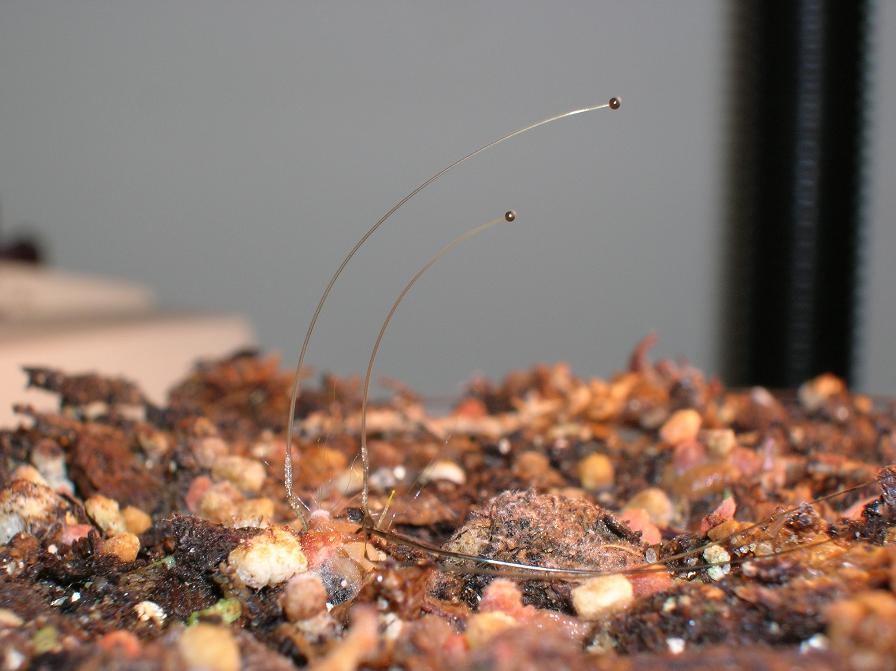
Phycomyces, a fungus, exhibiting phototropism

In biology, a tropism is a phenomenon indicating the growth or turning movement of an organism, usually a plant, in response to an environmental stimulus. In tropisms, this response is dependent on the direction of the stimulus (as opposed to nastic movements, which are non-directional responses). Tropisms are usually named for the stimulus involved; for example, a phototropism is a movement to the light source, and an anemotropism is the response and adaptation of plants to the wind.

Tropisms occur in three sequential steps. First, there is a sensation to a stimulus. Next, signal transduction occurs. And finally, the directional growth response occurs.

Tropisms can be regarded by ethologists as taxis (directional response) or kinesis (non-directional response).

The Cholodny–Went model, proposed in 1927, is an early model describing tropism in emerging shoots of monocotyledons, including the tendencies for the stalk to grow towards light (phototropism) and the roots to grow downward (gravitropism). In both cases, the directional growth is considered to be due to asymmetrical distribution of auxin, a plant growth hormone.

The term "tropism" (from Ancient Greek τρόπος (trópos) 'a turn, way, manner, style, etc.' and -ism) is also used in unrelated contexts. Viruses and other pathogens affect what is called "host tropism", "tissue tropism", or "cell tropism"; in which case tropism refers to the way in which different viruses/pathogens have evolved to preferentially target specific host species, specific tissue, or specific cell types within those species. In English, the word tropism is also used to indicate an action done without cognitive thought: However, "tropism" in this sense has a proper, although non-scientific, meaning as an innate tendency, natural inclination, or propensity to act in a certain manner towards a certain stimulus.

== Types ==
Tropisms can be distinguished according to the orientation with respect to the direction of the stimulus. They can commonly be either positive (towards the stimulus) or negative (away from it). Both of these are orthotropic, and can be contrasted with tropisms that are diatropic (perpendicular to the stimulus) or plagiotropic (at an oblique angle).

According to the type of stimulus, tropisms can be:

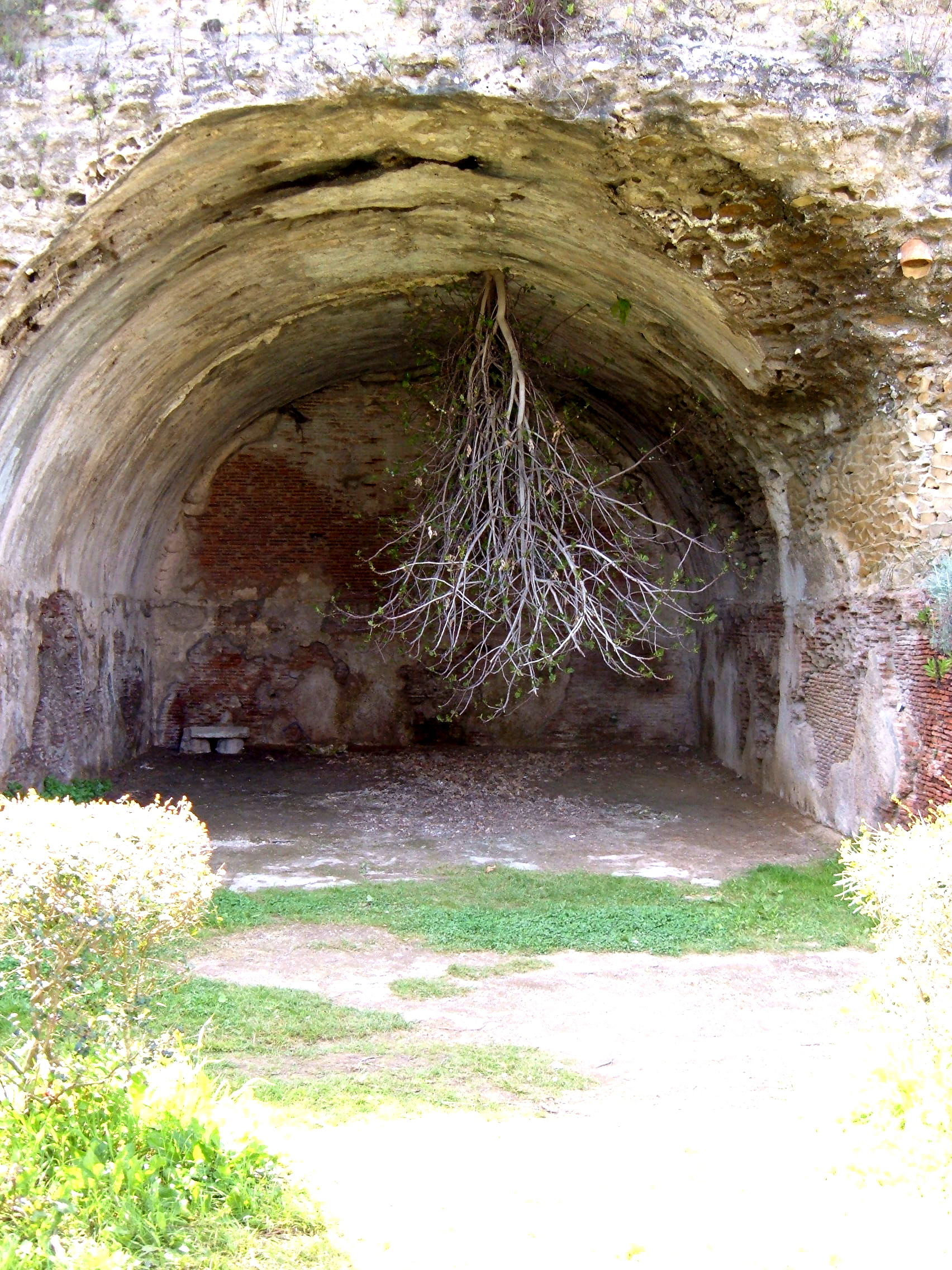
Example of gravitropism in the remains of a cellar of a Roman villa in the Archeologic Park in Baia, Italy

- Aerotropism: the growth of plants towards or away from a source of wind
- Chemotropism: the movement or growth in response to chemicals
- Electrotropism, or galvanotropism: the movement or growth in response to an electric field
- Exotropism: continuation of growth "outward," i.e. in the previously established direction
- Gravitropism (sometimes referred to as geotropism): is movement or growth in response to gravity
  - Apogeotropism: negative geotropism
- Heliotropism: the diurnal motion or seasonal motion of plant parts in response to the direction of the Sun, (e.g. the sunflower)
  - Apheliotropism: negative heliotropism
- Hydrotropism: movement or growth in response to water; in plants, the root cap senses differences in water moisture in the soil, and signals cellular changes that cause the root to curve towards the area of higher moisture
  - Prohydrotropism: positive hydrotropism
- Inotropism: muscular contraction in response to drugs
- Magnetotropism: movement or growth in response to magnetic fields
- Phototropism: movement or growth in response to lights or colors of light
  - Aphototropism: negative phototropism
  - Skototropism: negative phototropism of vines
- Selenotropism: motion of plant parts in response to the direction of the Moon
- Thermotropism: movement or growth in response to temperature
- Thigmotropism: movement or growth in response to touch or contact
- Traumatotropism: orientation deviation after suffering a wounding

== See also ==
- Chemotaxis
- Rapid plant movement
- Nutation (botany)
