= Electrotropism =

Growth or movement of an organism in response to an electric field

In biology, electrotropism, also known as galvanotropism, is a kind of tropism which results in growth or migration of an organism, usually a cell, in response to an exogenous electric field. Several types of cells such as nerve cells, muscle cells, fibroblasts, epithelial cells, green algae, spores, and pollen tubes, among others, have been already reported to respond by either growing or migrating in a preferential direction when exposed to an electric field.

== Electrotropism in Pollen Tubes ==
Electrotropism is known to play a role in the control of growth in cells and the development of tissues. By imposing an exogenous electric field, or modifying an endogenous one, a cell or a group of cells can greatly redirect their growth. Pollen tubes, for instance, align their polar growth with respect to an exogenous electric field. It has been observed that cells respond to electric fields as small as 0.1 mV/cell diameter (Note that the average radius of a large cell is in the order of a few micrometers). Electric fields have also been shown to act as directional signals in the repair and regeneration of wounded tissue. The pollen tube is an excellent model for the understanding of electrotropism and plant cell behavior in general. They are easily cultivated in vitro and have a very dynamic cytoskeleton that polymerizes at very high rates, providing the pollen tube with interesting growth properties. For instance, the pollen tube has an unusual kind of growth; it extends exclusively at its apex. Pollen tubes, as most biological systems, are influenced by electrical stimulus.

=== Introduction to Electrotropism Experiment in Pollen Tubes ===
Electrical fields have been shown to influence a gamut of cellular processes and responses. Animals, plants, and bacteria have a range of responses to electrical structures. The electrophysiology in humans consists of the nervous system regulating our actions and behaviors through controlled responses. Action potentials in our nerves and our heart are regulated based on our sodium and potassium levels. Pressure applied to our skin opens up mechanosensitive sodium channels. With the right amount of stimulus it can cause the action potential to reach threshold and cause an influx of sodium during the depolarization phase. After a couple of seconds, the membrane potential becomes positive and causes potassium ions to exit the cell during the repolarization phase and go below the threshold level into the hyperpolarization phase. The leaky sodium and potassium channels bring back the membrane potential to resting. The electrical signaling in humans allows us to perform rapid movements during periods of stress and anxiety. Similarly in plants, electrotropism is used in plant defense signaling and growth.

Plant growth in response to electric signals and fields has been studied by some researchers; however, it has not been as widely tested on pollen tubes. Specifically, pollen tubes are plants that are able to grow quickly in response to mechanical, electrical and chemical cues. This behavioral response allows pollen tubes to attack flower pistils and drop off sperm cells to ovules for fertilization. Carlos Agudelo and colleagues investigated the relationship between electrical signaling and pollen tube growth. The model organism used by the researcher was Camellia japonica pollen, because it displayed a differential sensitivity to the electrical fields when different parts of the tube were exposed. This flower is found in the wild areas of mainland China and Taiwan at elevations of 300–1100 meters. The plant grows at temperatures of 45-61 Fahrenheit and forms buds in the autumn and winter time.

=== Experimental Conditions ===
Analyzing the plant's homeostatic conditions and implementing it in the experiment, the researchers exposed parts of the pollen tube that were either the whole cell or the growing tip to see how growth occurs in response to an external field. The pollen tube serves as a useful model because it is similar to a nerve ending which conducts electrical signaling in humans and animals. Using the tip as a place for growth allows the cell to invade a substrate and for tropism. The experiment that the researchers conducted to support their hypothesis was that they suspended Camellia japonica pollen into an electrical field. Camellia japonica pollen was collected, dehydrated, and stored on silica gel at −20 °C until use. Pollen was thawed and rehydrated in a humid atmosphere for one hour before submersion in liquid growth medium and injection into the chip. By doing this setup Once the pollen is positioned in the ELoC, the growth medium flow is stopped and the electric field is turned on. The ELoc system is used to mimic the conditions surrounding a pollen tube when its grown in a plant. Then the pollen tubes are left to germinate and grow for 2 hours undisturbed unless otherwise stated. After the pollen tubes germinated, they were placed in DC and AC electric fields to see how an external field affected the growth of pollen tubes and the grains inside of them. The researchers applied varying voltages and frequencies to the pollen tubes and the grains to see how this affected their growth rate.

To ensure reproducibility of test conditions, no dyes were implemented, no extreme voltages were applied, and pollen from the same plant and flowering season was used as not to be confounders in the experiment. The researchers applied an increasing voltage to not wear out the microelectrodes and not cause the pollen tubes and grains to burst. It was difficult to remove the air bubbles involved in the process, but they tried to reduce the amount of water that was present in the microchamber.

Under a constant electric field of 1 V/cm pollen tubes of Camellia japonica have been reported to grow towards the negative electrode. Tomato and tobacco pollen tubes grew towards the positive electrode for constant electric fields higher than 0.2 V/cm. Agapanthus africanus pollen tubes grow towards the nearest electrode when a constant electric field of 7.5 V/cm is applied. Another report states that pollen tubes do not change growth direction under AC electric fields.

=== Results and Discussion ===
The authors had some compelling results based on their experimental procedure. In the zero-voltage test all zones within the electric chamber showed a similar average tube length indicating that the simple vicinity to the aluminium electrode did not affect pollen tube growth. As the electric fields increased the average pollen tube length decreased. Notably, the percentage of pollen germination decreased when the applied electric field increased. Germination was not as affected by small electric fields but was decreased when the electric field was raised above the threshold of 8 V/cm. The authors of this paper concluded that the presence of external electric fields on the behavior of Camellia japonica pollen tubes interfered with pollen germination and growth in a dose dependent manner. AC fields restored pollen tube growth for frequencies greater than 100 mHz. Importantly, this recovery of growth was achieved under the same strong field strengths (up to 10.71 V/cm) that caused complete growth inhibition at lower frequencies and with DC fields. This indicates that pollen cells can tolerate strong electric fields and perform normal growth—as long as these are applied in the form of high frequency AC fields. The critical field strength that inhibited pollen performance when the entire cell (including grain) was exposed was approximately 10 V/cm. By contrast under a DC field, a much stronger field of 30 V/cm was necessary to impede pollen tube growth when only the growing tip of the cell was exposed. This suggests that pollen tubes can endure stronger fields than grains. This finding may be explained by differences in ion transport behaviour in these two cellular regions, and is consistent with the extremely polar organization of the cell. Ions are being transported when an electric field is applied to cells that are producing the necessary nutrients for growth.

=== Proposed Physiology ===
Although the authors did not delve deep in the physiology of how electric fields affect plants, they did propose that ions are being regulated during this experiment. The researchers stated that an electric field's signal is the stimulus that binds to a receptor on the pollen tube. The electrical signal causes a signal cascade that leads to the increased production of sodium and potassium ions in the cell. These ions accumulate in the cell wall of the pollen tube which causes the expansion of the cell wall due to the buildup of the ions. With a strong electric field, it allows the plant to grow in the direction of the electric field.

=== Conclusions ===
This experiment performed by the researchers shows that electrical fields and forces that exist in plants can shape their external and internal structures. Plants have the ability to detect small electrical fields resulting from wounds or structures within their organelles. The magnetic field on Earth and in the electrical signals in plants can affect plant growth and crop yield. Photosynthesis may be affected by the electrical field as conducted by Hebda and colleagues. It is important to take into consideration the plant's electrical signaling system when assessing its growth and behavior.

Even though efforts have been made to clarify the mechanisms of intra- and extracellular electrical signaling in pollen tubes, the understanding of how pollen tubes react to electric fields and how the electric cue is related to the internal dynamics of pollen tube growth remains limited.

== Root and Shoot Growth ==
Electric fields may affect root and shoot growth of plants. The effects of electrotropism on plant growth can be witnessed in the grape "Uslu". An electric field has similar forces as a magnetic field. A magnetic field can be created by using an alternating electric field. Thus, a magnetic field may have similar effects on plants as an electric field used in electrotropism. A study used a Helmholtz coil with electricity to induce a magnetic field around scions of Uslu grape. It is suggested that magnetic field intensity and duration can influence the root and shoot growth of Uslu grape scions. In the specific study, the application of 0.15 mT at 50 Hz for 10 and 15 minutes gave rise to the highest shoot length and plant weight. The mechanism of how a magnetic field induced by electricity can cause plant growth is yet unknown.

Further, it is known that plant shoot length is controlled by an increase in the hormone auxin. Auxin signals the apical buds at the apex of the plant stem to start elongating upwards. There may be a connection between electric fields and the release or production of auxin in increasing elongation of the shoot.

=== Root Directional Growth ===
Electric fields may also dictate the direction of plant root growth. In one study, an electric field applied to the Vigna mungo root, which caused the Central Elongation Zone (CEZ) to move toward the anode; however, the Distal Elongation Zone (DEZ) of the root moved toward the cathode of the field. This type of movement results in a curvature of the root. This result stays consistent when the electric field is applied locally to either the CEZ or DEZ individually, showing that it is not an overall gravitropic response. Although the mechanism of root electrotropism is not known, it is clear that different root regions have different behaviors in response to electricity.

=== Root Morphological Change ===
One study suggests that when a weak DC electric field is applied to the roots of the plant Arundo donax, there are morphological changes in the roots. An electric field of 12.0 V/m with a current of 10 mA was applied to the test plants. The treated samples had root hairs that were oversized compared to the control. Specifically, roots had larger diameters, more branching, and longer lengths. The test group's root hairs were also notably longer than the control group's root hairs. This could mean that the plant treated with an electric field is able to uptake water and nutrients differently, leading to differential plant growth in electric field conditions. Larger root hairs may enable better carbon dioxide release in the roots and increase the rate of cation exchange from soil particles.
