= Thermonasty =

Undirected movement by plants in response to temperature

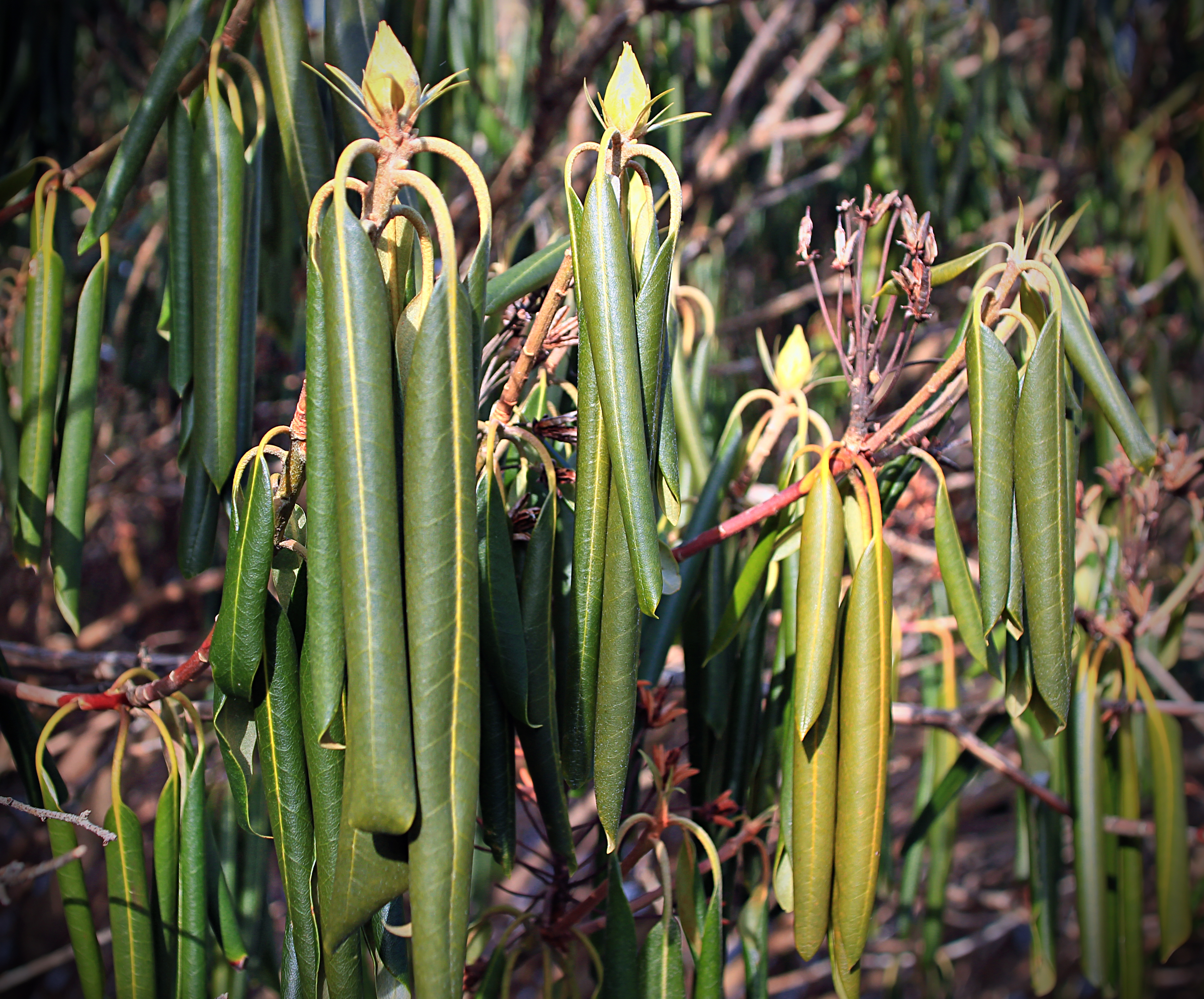
Rhododendron (Nature's thermometers)

In plant biology, thermonasty is a nondirectional response to temperature in plants. It is a form of nastic movement, not to be confused with thermotropism, which is a directional response in plants to temperature. A common example of this is in some Rhododendron species, but thermonasty has also been observed in other plants, such as Phryma leptostachya. Flower opening in certain crocus and tulip species is also known to be thermonastic. These movements are thought to be regulated by having unequal cell elongation in certain plant tissues, causing different tissues to bend. In other processes, like in the temperature regulation of flower openings, movement has instead been shown to be a result of irreversible cell growth, a growth type not typically associated with plant movement. Furthermore, thermonasty has been shown to be independent of other environmental signals, such as light and gravity.

Thermonasty is generally considered to be an adaptation for protection against colder temperatures. It is hypothesized that thermonastic movement is an adaptation for photoprotection, as harsh freezing conditions make leaves more susceptible to light damage from the sun. In flowers it may instead serve as a signal for flower opening and closing with rising and falling temperatures. Although the exact mechanism for thermonasty is still not fully understood, there has been research conducted to reveal more.

== Thermonasty in Rhododendron ==
In some species of Rhododendron, thermonasty is as well-known phenomenon during the winter months. The leaves can be seen to droop from their branches and curl inwards under freezing temperatures. A research group from Iowa State University tried to determine if water transport proteins, aquaporins, were involved with curling in Rhododendron leaves. They took leaves from a thermonastic and non-thermonastic Rhododendron and subjected them to freezing and thawing conditions, sampling their RNA levels for their target aquaporins at specific time points. They did this to see if there was any change in the expression levels of aquaporins during changes in temperatures in association with thermonastic curling.

They concluded that expression of aquaporins decreases during the initial freezing stages, but in both species the proteins were then up-regulated as the temperature continued to drop. The researchers concluded that there may be some association with aquaporins to thermonasty, but they could not conclude what kind of association that is. They were, however, able to support a previous hypothesis that extracellular freezing is required for the thermonastic curling response. They exposed leaves from the thermonastic Rhododendron species to freezing temperatures, but some leaves had water that froze on the surface, and others did not. Leaves with extracellular water freezing curled at a higher temperature than leaves without, indicating that the extracellular freezing was necessary for curling at a higher temperature.
