= Heliotropism =

Motion of flowers or leaves to face the Sun

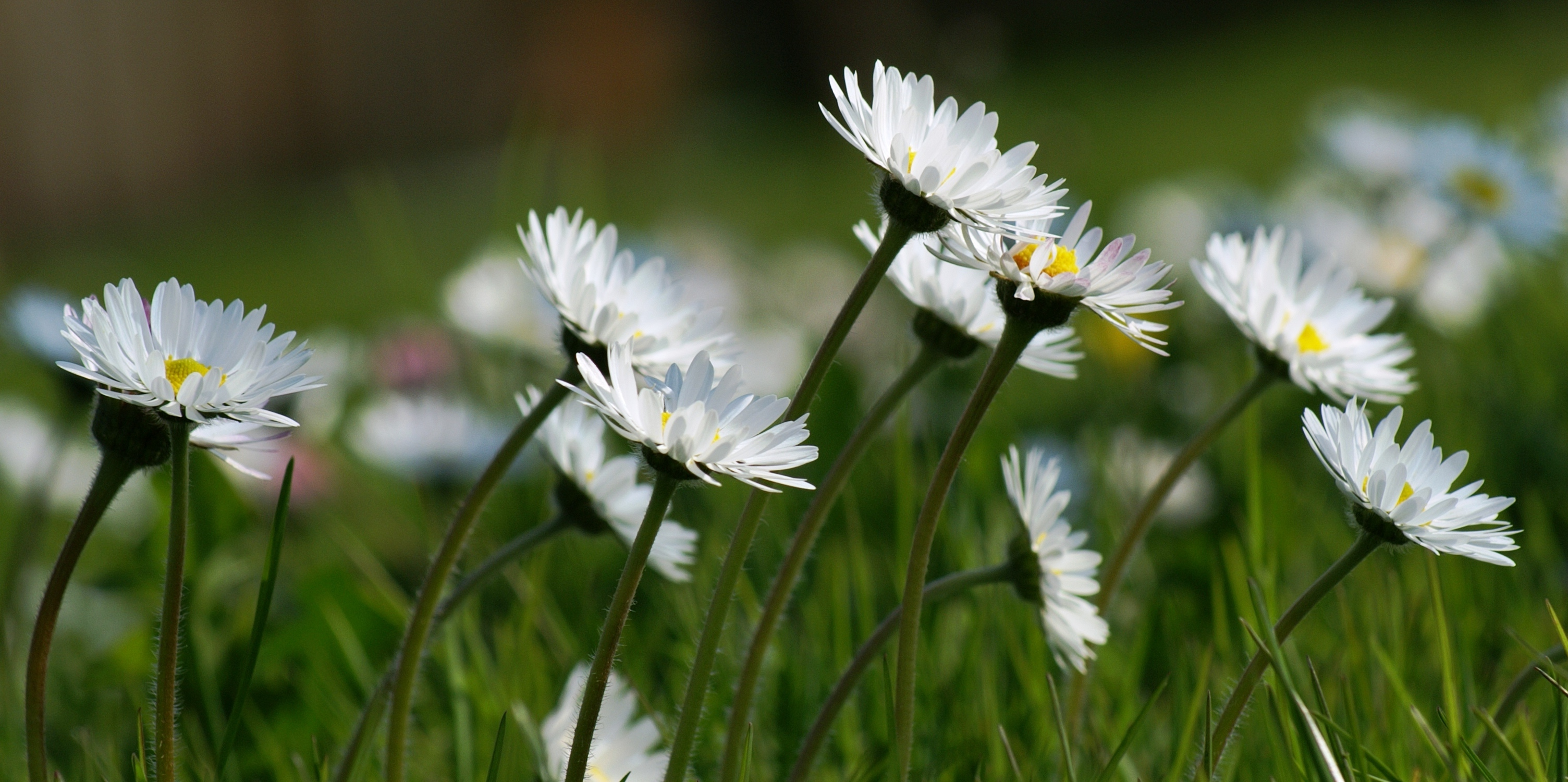
Daisies (Bellis perennis) face the Sun after opening in the morning and will follow the Sun through the day.

Heliotropism, a form of tropism, is the diurnal or seasonal motion of plant parts (flowers or leaves) in response to the direction of the Sun.

== History ==
The habit of some plants to move in the direction of the Sun, a form of tropism, was already known by the Ancient Greeks. They named one of those plants after that property Heliotropium, meaning "the one that turns to the sun". The Greeks assumed it to be a passive effect, presumably the loss of fluid on the illuminated side, that did not need further study. Aristotle's logic that plants are passive and immobile prevailed. In the 19th century, however, botanists discovered that growth processes in the plant were involved, and conducted increasingly in-depth experiments. In 1832, the Swiss botanist A. P. de Candolle called the phenomenon in any plant heliotropism.

It was renamed phototropism in 1892 because it is a response to light rather than to the sun, and because the phototropism of algae in lab studies at that time strongly depended on brightness (positively phototropic for weak light, and negatively phototropic for bright light, like sunlight).

The French scientist Jean-Jacques d'Ortous de Mairan was one of the first to study heliotropism when he experimented with Mimosa pudica (the "sensitive plant"). Heliotropism was studied by Charles Darwin and published in his 1880 book The Power of Movement in Plants, a work which included other stimuli to plant movement such as gravity, moisture and touch.

== Types ==
=== Floral ===
Heliotropic flowers track the Sun's motion across the sky from east to west. Daisies, Bellis perennis, close their petals at night but open in the morning light and then follow the sun as the day progresses. During the night, the flowers may assume a random orientation, while at dawn they turn again toward the east where the Sun rises. The motion is performed by motor cells in a flexible segment just below the flower, called a pulvinus. The motor cells are specialized in pumping potassium ions into nearby tissues, changing their turgor pressure. The segment flexes because the motor cells at the shadow side elongate due to a turgor rise. This is considered to be turgor-mediated heliotropism. For plant organs that lack pulvini, heliotropism can occur through irreversible cell expansion producing particular growth patterns. This form of heliotropism is considered to be growth-mediated.

=== Leaf ===
Leaf heliotropism is the solar tracking behavior of plant leaves. Some plant species have leaves that orient themselves perpendicularly to the sun's rays in the morning (diaheliotropism), and others have those that orient themselves parallel to these rays at midday (paraheliotropism). Floral heliotropism is not necessarily exhibited by the same plants that exhibit leaf heliotropism.

== Explanations ==
Several hypotheses have been proposed for the occurrence of heliotropism in flowers:

- The pollinator attraction hypothesis holds that the warmth associated with full insolation of the flower is a direct reward for pollinators.
- The growth promotion hypothesis assumes that effective absorption of solar energy and the consequent rise in temperature has a favourable effect on pollen germination, growth of the pollen tube and seed production.
- The cooling hypothesis, appropriate to flowers in hot climates, assumes that the position of flowers is adjusted to avoid overheating.

Flower heliotropism could in theory increase reproductive success by increasing pollination, fertilization success, and/or seed development, especially in the spring flowers. Some solar tracking plants are not purely heliotropic: in those plants the change of orientation is an innate circadian motion triggered by light, which continues for one or more periods if the light cycle is interrupted. Tropical convolvulaceous flowers show a preferred orientation, pointing in the general direction of the sun but not exactly tracking the sun. They demonstrated no diurnal heliotropism but strong seasonal heliotropism. If solar tracking is exact, the sun’s rays would always enter the corolla tube and warm the gynoecium, a process which could be dangerous in a tropical climate. However, by adopting a certain angle away from the solar angle, this is prevented. The trumpet shape of these flowers thus acts as a parasol shading the gynoecium at times of maximum solar radiation, and not allowing the rays to impinge on the gynoecium.

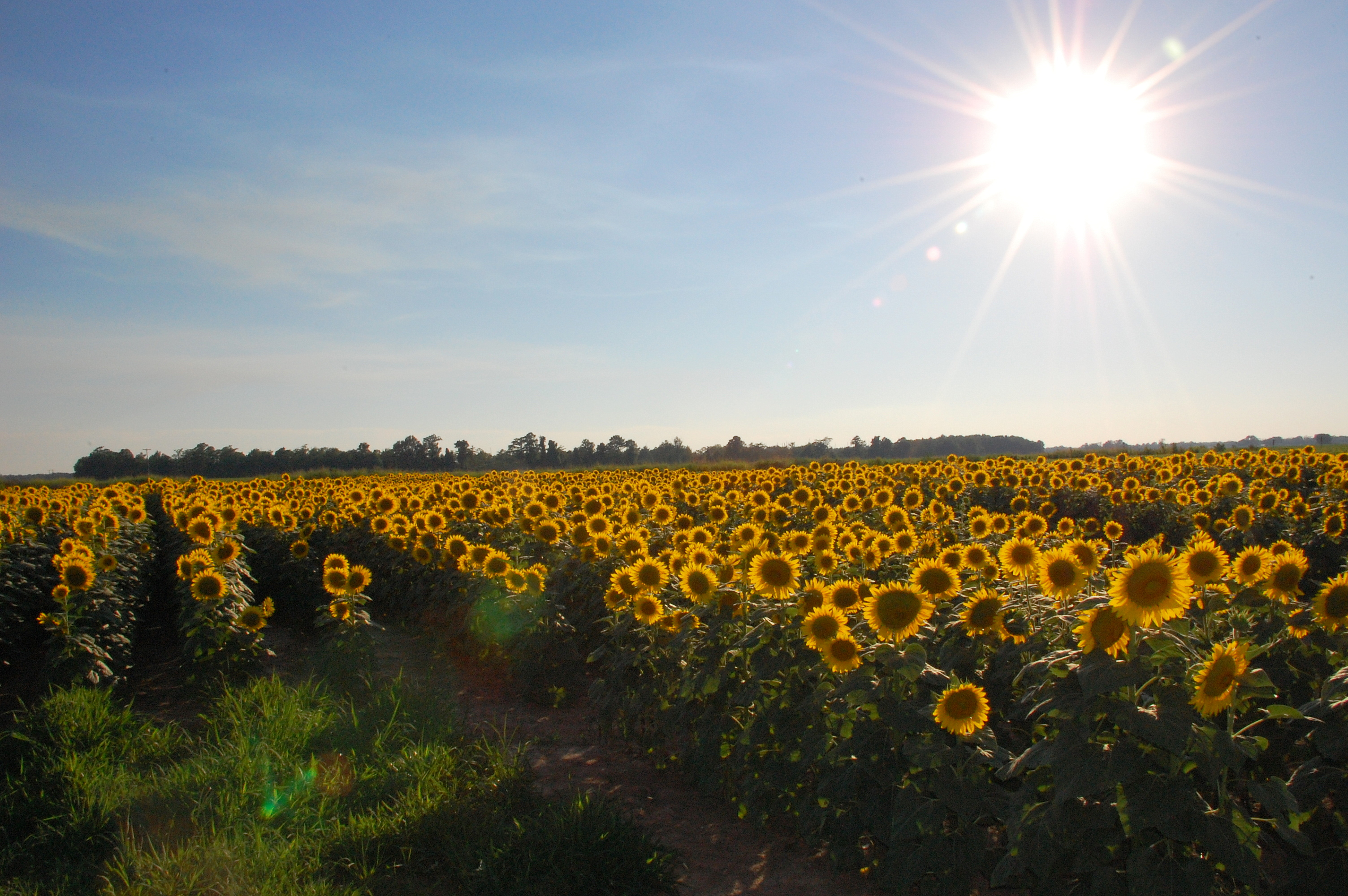
Sunflowers in full bloom are not heliotropic, so they do not follow the Sun. The flowerheads face east all day, so in the afternoon, they are backlit by the Sun.

In the case of sunflowers, a common misconception is that sunflower heads track the Sun across the sky throughout the whole life cycle. The uniform alignment of the flowers does result from heliotropism in an earlier development stage, the bud stage, before the appearance of flower heads. The apical bud of the plant will track the Sun during the day from east to west, and then will quickly move west to east overnight as a result of the plant's circadian clock. The buds are heliotropic until the end of the bud stage, and finally face east. Phototropic bending can be catalyzed in the hypocotyls of juvenile sunflower seedlings while heliotropic bending in the shoot apex does not start occurring until the later developmental stages of the plant, showing a difference between these two processes. The flower of the sunflower preserves the final orientation of the bud, thus keeping the mature flower facing east.
