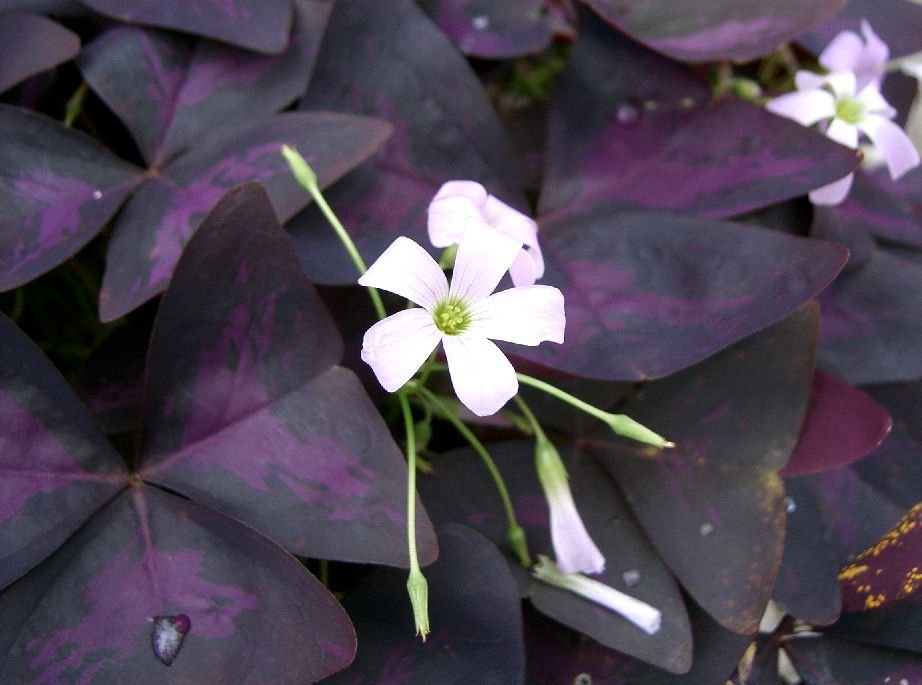

Scientific classification
- Kingdom: Plantae
- Clade: Tracheophytes
- Clade: Angiosperms
- Clade: Eudicots
- Clade: Rosids
- Order: Oxalidales
- Family: Oxalidaceae
- Genus: Oxalis
- Species: O. triangularis

Binomial name
- Oxalis triangularis A.St.-Hil.

Synonyms
- Oxalis regnellii

= Oxalis triangularis =

Species of flowering plant

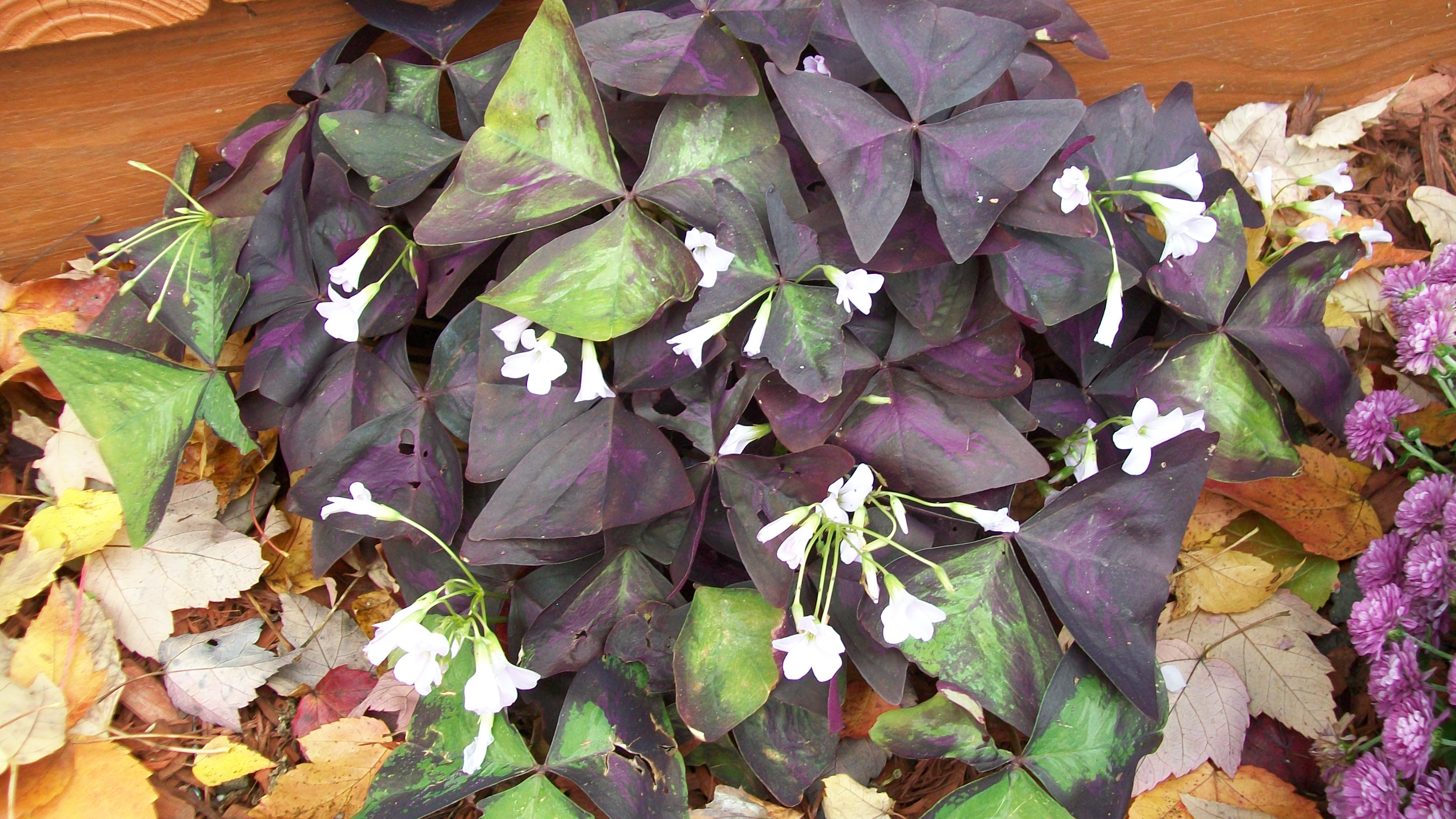
Fall

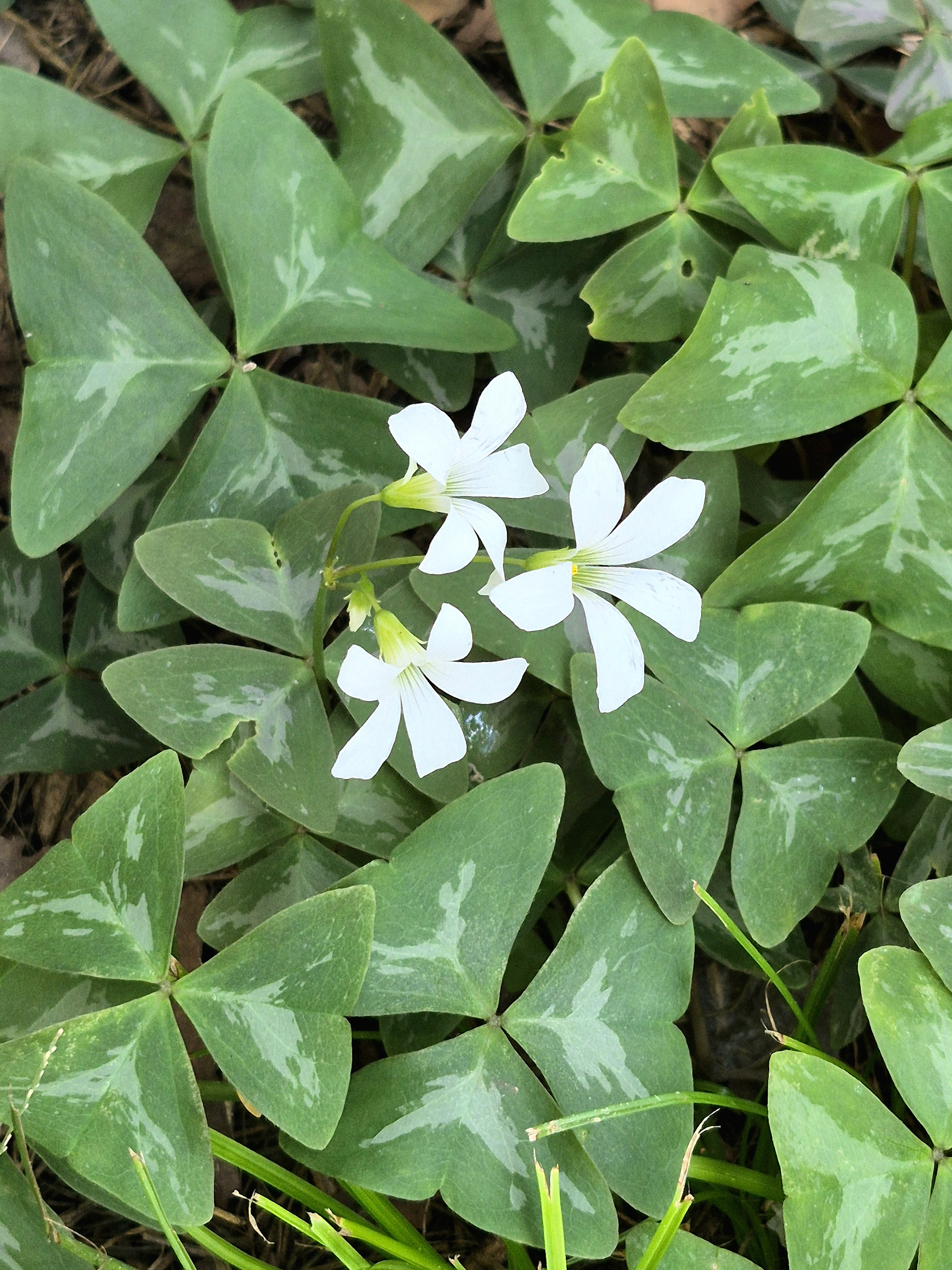
O. triangularis with green leaves, found in nature (southern Brazil)

Oxalis triangularis, commonly called false shamrock, is a species of perennial plant in the family Oxalidaceae. It is native to several countries in southern South America. This woodsorrel is typically grown as a houseplant but can be grown outside in USDA climate zones 8a–11, preferably in light shade.

The deep maroon leaves are trifoliate, like species in the clover genus Trifolium which are commonly called shamrock, hence the name "false shamrock". The leaves fold down at night, when disturbed, and when in harsh sunlight. The white or pale pink five-petalled flowers also close at night.

== Description ==
Growing to 50 cm (20 in) tall and broad, the subspecies O. triangularis subsp. papilionacea, the purpleleaf false shamrock, is hardy in mild and coastal areas of Britain, down to −5 °C (23 °F), and has won the Royal Horticultural Society's Award of Garden Merit. It is a perennial plant without aerial stem, formed by leaves borne by a long petiole emerging at the ground level of a tuberous rhizome (5 cm long, over 10 – 15 mm in diameter, fully covered with scales). The leaf is formed of three sessile leaflets, obtriangular to obovate-triangular, glabrous, arranged in the same plane perpendicular to the petiole.

The five densely haired sepals are 5 to 5.5 mm long, narrow and slightly reddish at the top. The five white petals are about 2 inches long and oblong-lanceolate. The stamens and the style are densely hairy. The limb of the wild species is green but purple cultivars have been selected for horticulture. The petiole, soft, whitish, is 15 to 25 cm long. Flowering takes place from spring to autumn.

=== Movement ===
A timelapse of the leaves of O. triangularis closing at night. The recording is at ~750x actual speed and covers a 1.5 hr period of time.

The leaves of O. triangularis move in response to light levels, opening in high ambient light (in the day) and closing at low light levels (at night). During this movement, the leaflets fold at the level of the central vein. This movement is not due to growth and is instead powered by changes in turgor pressure in cells at the base of the leaf. It is an example of photonasty.

== Range ==
The species is distributed in several countries of South America: Brazil, Bolivia, Argentina, and Paraguay. It is a neophyte in the United States in the states of Florida and Louisiana. It is also widely found in East India, abundantly in states like Nagaland and Manipur.

== Cultivation and life cycle ==
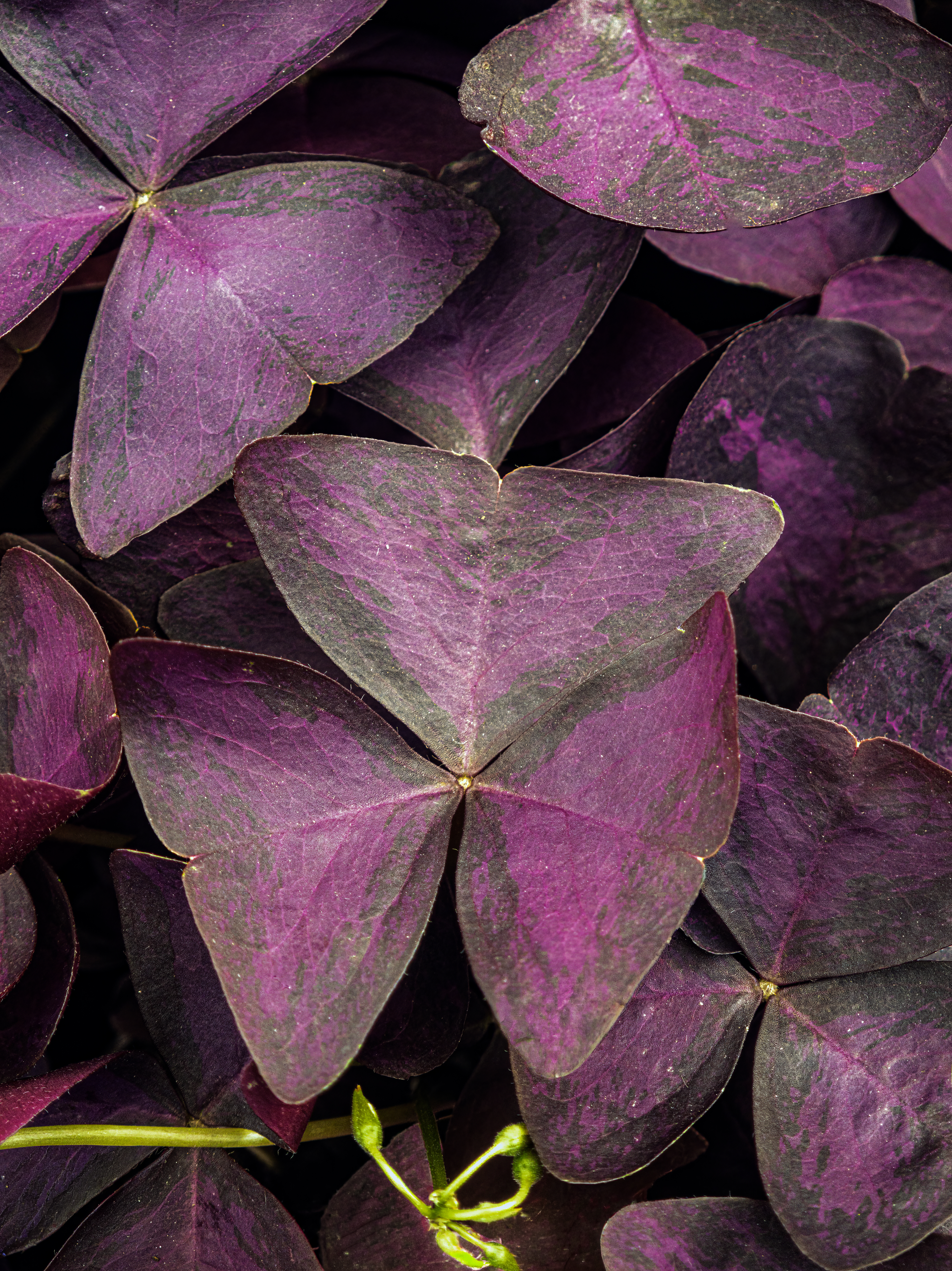
Leaves

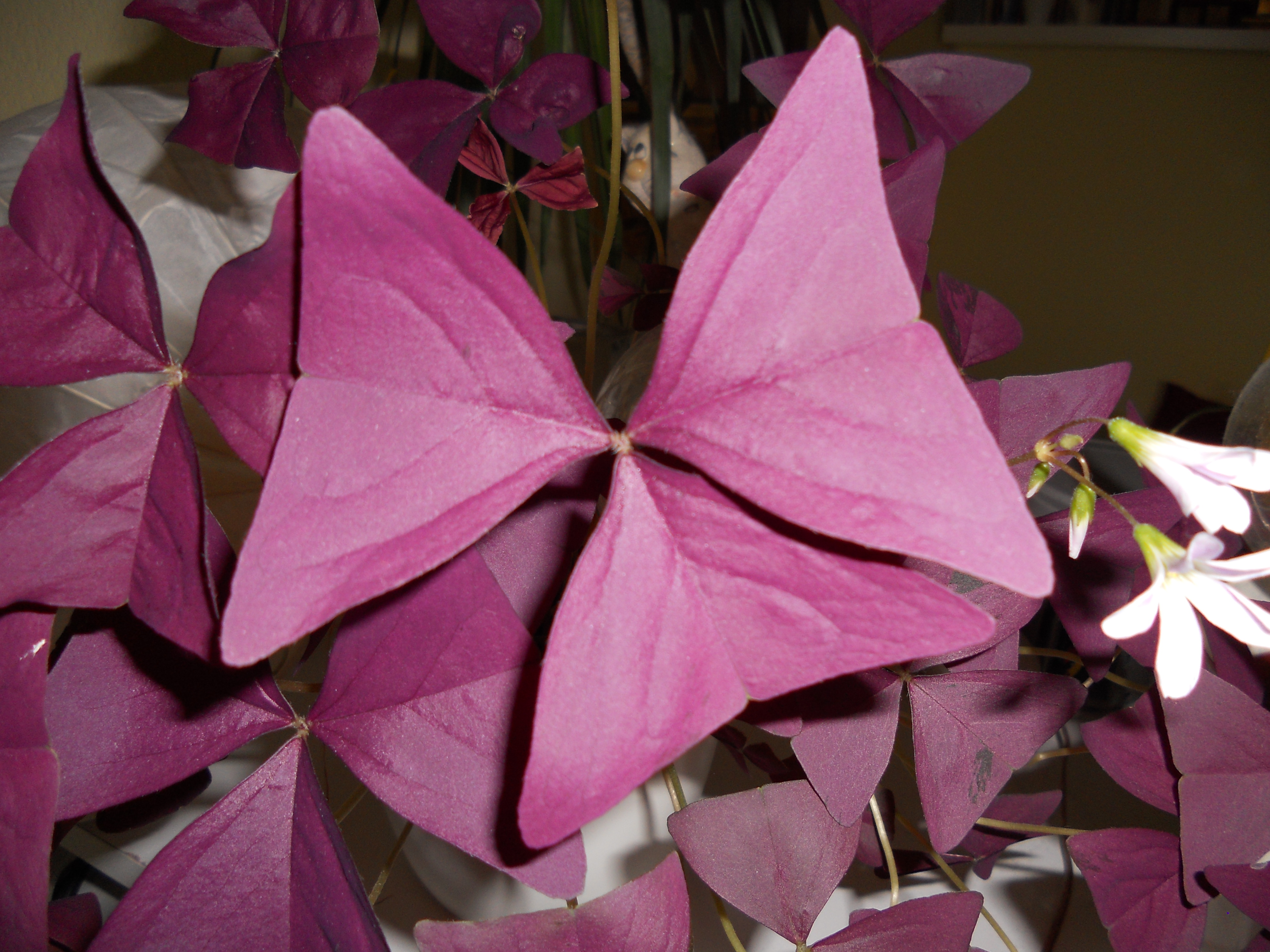
Ornamental shape with red leaves

Oxalis triangularis requires bright indirect sunlight supplemented with a cool indoor temperature of 15 °C (59 °F). It can tolerate higher indoor temperatures, but will go into dormancy prematurely and/or begin to take on a "tired" appearance if temperatures exceed 27 °C (81 °F) for prolonged periods of time. It thrives in an average potting soil with good drainage.

Mature plants are cut back to the soil every 3–5 years in early summer or during the dormancy period. Young plants are cut back to the soil every year in early summer or during the dormancy period, until they reach maturity. To avoid frost, they are usually grown indoors in some regions. They are planted in soil rich in humus and well-drained. They should be watered only when the topsoil looks dry. In winter, they should not be watered.

The main difficulty in caring for frost-resistant oxalises is to prevent them from growing uncontrollably. The ripe fruit of the plant will crack, throwing out seeds over a considerable distance, so it should not be planted close to vegetable beds.

Oxalis need no fertilizer before flowering. Afterwards it can be supplemented with an appropriate fertilizer. Plants usually only need nitrogen but phosphorus, potassium, and easily absorbed trace elements help them to flower long and beautifully. When growing in a flowerbed, it is also worth feeding oxalis during the flowering period with a small dose of a multi-component fertilizer.

The subspecies Oxalis triangularis subsp. papilionacea has won the Royal Horticultural Society's Award of Garden Merit.

=== Usage ===
The leaves and flowers are edible but should be used in moderation. Toxicity can occur if large quantities are ingested due to the presence of soluble calcium oxalates.

Thus, the whole plant is potentially toxic to humans and other animals. In horses it can cause colic and possible kidney failure if large amounts are consumed.

== Propagation ==
Oxalis triangularis grows from corms (also called "bulbils"), propagated by division. Like other corms, it goes through regular dormancy periods; at the end of each period, the corms can be unearthed, offsets cut and replanted in appropriate soil, where they will grow into new plants.
