= Tip growth =

Tip growth is an extreme form of polarised growth of living cells that results in an elongated cylindrical cell morphology with a rounded tip at which the growth activity takes place. Tip growth occurs in algae (e.g., Acetabularia acetabulum), fungi (hyphae) and plants (e.g. root hairs and pollen tubes).

Tip growth is a process that has many similarities in diverse walled cells such as pollen tubes, root hairs, and hyphae.

== Fungal tip growth and hyphal tropisms ==
Fungal hyphae extend continuously at their extreme tips, where enzymes are released into the environment and where new wall materials are synthesised. The rate of tip extension can be extremely rapid - up to 40 micrometres per minute. It is supported by the continuous movement of materials into the tip from older regions of the hyphae. So, in effect, a fungal hypha is a continuously moving mass of protoplasm in a continuously extending tube. This unique mode of growth - apical growth - is the hallmark of fungi, and it accounts for much of their environmental and economic significance.
