= Thermotropism =

Movement of a plant or part of a plant in response to temperature change

Thermotropism or thermotropic movement is the movement of an organism or a part of an organism in response to heat or changes from the environment's temperature. A common example is the curling of Rhododendron leaves in response to cold temperatures. Mimosa pudica also show thermotropism by the collapsing of leaf petioles leading to the folding of leaflets, when temperature drops.

The term "thermotropism" was originated by French botanist Philippe Van Tieghem in his 1884 textbook Traité de botanique. Van Tieghem stated that a plant irradiated with an optimum growth temperature on one side laterally, and a much higher or lower temperature on the opposite side, would exhibit faster growth on the side exposed to optimum temperature.

The definition of thermotropism can sometimes be confused with the term, thermotaxis, a mechanism by which temperature gradients can alter the behavior of cells, such as moving toward the cold environment. The difference between them is that thermotropism is more commonly used in botany because it could not only represent the movement in organism level, thermotropism could also represent an organ level of movement, such as movement of leaves and roots toward or away from heat; but thermotaxis can only represent locomotion at the organism level, such as the movement of a mouse away from a warm environment.

The precise physiological mechanism enabling plant thermotropism is not yet understood. It has been noted that one of the earliest physiological responses by plants to cooling is an influx of calcium ions from the cell walls into the cytosol, which increases calcium ion concentration in the intracellular space. This calcium influx is dependent upon mechanical changes in the actin cytoskeleton that alter the fluidity of the cell membrane, which allows calcium ion channels to open. From this information, a hypothesis has formed that the plant cell plasma membrane is an important site of plant temperature perception.

== Thermotropism in leaves ==
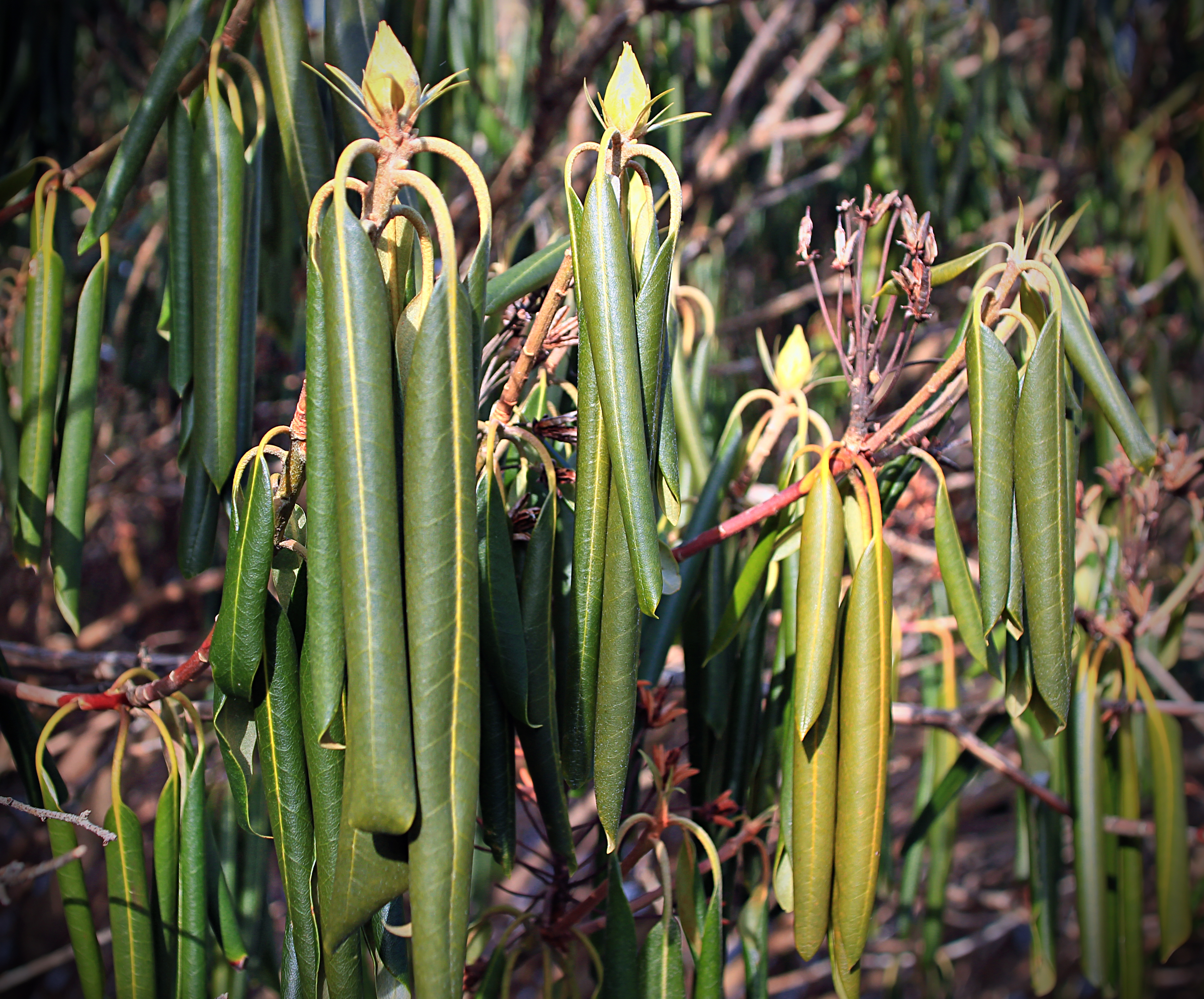
Rhododendron leaves curling in response to cold temperatures.

Gardening hobbyists have frequently noted the dramatic change in the shape of Rhododendron or "Rhodie" leaves during warm versus cold weather. In warm weather, the leaf has a flat oblong shape. As the temperature of the leaf drops, the blade curls inward, giving the leaf a tubular, cigar-like shape.

Research on Rhododendron leaf thermotropism suggests that the curling response might help prevent damage to cell membranes caused by rapid thawing after a freeze. During the winter months, wild Rhododendrons in the Appalachian Mountains regularly drop to freezing temperatures at night, then thaw again in the early morning. Because a curled leaf has less of its surface area exposed to the sunlight, the leaf will thaw more slowly than it would if it were unfurled. Slower thawing minimizes damage caused to leaf cell membranes by ice crystal formation.

Although there is little known about the molecular mechanisms of this rolling behavior, turgor pressure is responsible for the leaf movement. The exact stimulus for this output is not understood, but it is known that freezing cold temperatures causes an influx of water to the leaf petiole. As the turgor pressure increases, the leaves roll up, making it tighter to the stem. The leaf also droops perpendicular to the ground. There are predictions on the mechanism of this behavior. Regional changes of cell hydration can cause the inward curling. Another prediction is a change in cell wall physiology. These predictions are very broad, indicating the need for further research.

There are currently two hypotheses to why Rhododendrons do this. The first is that the shape is more effective for snow shedding and better protects the more sensitive areas. Another hypothesis for leaf rolling called the desiccation theory, circulating in recent years, is to prevent membrane and light damage.

In a 2017 study about cold stressed Rhododendron leaves showed that photosynthetic proteins decreased, while proteins for cell permeability increased. The same study showed the highest increase in proteins were responsible for transcription and translation regulation. Thermotropic response in rhododendron leaves protects cells by changing leaf shape and protein levels.

== Thermotropism in roots ==
The roots of some plants, including Zea mays, have been shown to bend differently when exposed to different temperature conditions. In general, growing roots tend to bend away from warmer temperatures, and towards cooler temperatures, within a normal range. It has been suggested that this growth behavior is beneficial because in most natural environments, soil closer to the ground's surface is warmer in temperature, while deeper soil is cooler.

Experimentation with maize has demonstrated the existence of thermotropic responses in roots, with stronger responses seen when the thermal gradient increases. Positive thermotropism, or growth towards higher temperatures, was shown to occur at lower temperatures, with the strongest response observed at a temperature of 15 C. As the temperature increases, the strength of the response decreases. With continually temperature increases, a lack of thermotropic response is observed and occurs once a temperature threshold is reached. This threshold is dependent on the thermal gradient, with the threshold being colder with smaller gradients. For example, a gradient of 4.2 C per cm had a threshold value of 30 C while a gradient of 0.5 C per cm had a threshold value of 24 C. It is thought that this lack of thermotropic response is due to the lack of sufficient stimuli to induce root curvature. Negative thermotropic behavior was recorded and was shown to occur at higher temperature, but the conditions to establish such behavior is less defined.

Within the same experiment, roots were capable of undergoing positive thermotropism away from gravitational force. The inhibition of normal gravitropic curvature was seen when temperatures were 18 C and lower, with stronger curvature away from gravity seen with lower temperature. This overriding behavior indicates integration of the plant's gravitropic and thermotropic system and suggests that the sensory systems are an interconnected network of responses rather than separate stimulation response pathways.

== Thermotropism's relation with Heliotropism ==
Para-heliotropic movements in the Phaseolus genus (beans) coincided with regulating leaf temperatures to improve photosynthesis efficiency and heat avoidance in hot, sunny, and arid environments. These movements worked to avoid photo-inhibition and keep leaf temperature lower than the air temperature. In sunflowers, we find a different relation involving floral warming. The floral heads of these plants follow the sun from east to west causing increased solar irradiation heating the plant. This resulted in more pollinators being attracted. A study showed this by forcing some floral heads to the west leaving other floral heads to warm illustrating varied pollinator choice. Though these findings are in correlation with heliotropisms, these heat avoidance and acquisition strategies are entwined with thermotropism as well. With further research, more examples can be found that can definitively detail the thermotropic role in heat avoidance and acquisition.
