= Aerotropism =

Growth of an organism either toward or away from air

Aerotropism or oxytropism is the growth of an organism either toward or away from a source of air/oxygen. Evidence of this behavior has been recorded in plants, bacteria, and fungi.

== History ==
In 1882 Engelmann demonstrated oxygen-sensing orientation in oxytactic microorganisms relative to an oxygen gradient. The orientation of plant roots toward air was reported by Molisch in 1884, and in 1906 Pfeffer proposed that oxygen was the chemical cue that caused the plant root to change direction, as opposed to other gases present in air.

== Aerotropism versus oxytropism ==
In a 1908 Botanical Gazette article, the author mentions an article by W. Polowzow where it is proposed that the term aerotropism be concerned with the sensitivities of organisms to air and that the term aeroidotropism be related to organism sensitivities to pure gases. The author posits that there is no need for the differentiation. Several scientists in papers cited for this article use the term “oxytropism” seemingly interchangeably for aerotropism when speaking about the response to oxygen concentrations.

== Purpose and mechanism in plants ==
1. Plant roots need oxygen for respiration. Roots take up oxygen from the gaps in the soil, called soil pores. The plant root hairs take up the oxygen to be used in respiration. This respiration is important so that the root hair cells have the energy they need to bring mineral salts into the cell via active transport.
2. When oxygen is unavailable in soil, like when it is displaced by water, anaerobic conditions are created which can kill the plant. It is in the plant's best interest to seek out oxygen sources. There are two different types of oxygen sensing: direct and indirect. While the mechanism isn't fully understood, it is speculated that indirect sensing occurs when there is a change in cellular homeostasis, which may be driven by calcium levels, adenylate charge, ratio of reduced/oxidized glutathione and carbohydrate availability. Direct sensing may be driven by transcription factors and signal transduction pathways.

== Aerotropism in plants ==
1. Using a garden pea plant (Pisum savitum) in a microgravity environment in space, scientists observed that oxytropic curvature was present in the roots of all of the plants. It was also observed that the amount of curvature declined in direct relation to the decline of oxygen concentrations.
2. In a case where scientists studied the behavior of pollen grain germination of eight different species, they concluded that oxytropic behavior is prevalent but unpredictable. In three of the eight species, the pollen tube grew away from higher oxygen concentrations, one of the species grew toward the higher oxygen concentration, while the remaining 4 species showed random tube-growth orientations.

== See also ==
- Phototropism
- Gravitropism
