= Zoidogamy =

Zoidogamy is a type of plant reproduction in which male gametes (antherozoids) swim in a path of water to the female gametes (archegonium). Zoidogamy is found in algae, bryophytes, pteridophytes, and some gymnosperms (others use siphonogamy). Zoidogamy relates to evolution, as it provides a pathway from wind-borne abiotic pollination and similar mechanisms to fluid-based mechanisms used in most animals.
