= Magnetotropism =

Plant growth in response to magnetic stimuli

Magnetotropism is the movement or plant growth in response to the stimulus provided by the magnetic field in plants (specifically agricultural plants) around the world. As a natural environmental factor in the Earth, variations of magnetic field level cause many biological effects, including germination rate, flowering time, photosynthesis, biomass accumulation, activation of cryptochrome, and shoot growth.

== Biological effects ==
As an adaptive behavior, magnetotropism is recognized as a method to improve agricultural success, using the well-studied plant model, Arabidopsis thaliana, a typical small plant which is native to the Europe and Asia with well-known genomic functions. In 2012, Xu et al. conducted a Near-Null Magnetic Field experiment under white light and long-day conditions using the homemade equipment of combining three couples of Helmholtz coils in vertical, north–south, east–west direction compensating near-null magnetic field. Xu noted that under the near-null magnetic field, Arabidopsis thaliana delays the flowering time by altering the transcription level of three cryptochrome related florigen genes:PHYB, CO, and FT; Arabidopsis thaliana also induced longer hypocotyl length under white light in the Near-Null magnetic field compared to standard geomagnetic field and either dark or white light conditions. Furthermore, the biomass accumulation reduces in the near-null magnetic field while Arabidopsis thaliana switches from vegetative growth to reproductive growth. Not until recently, Agliassa conducted a similar experiment continuing Xu et al. ’s discovery found out that Arabidopsis thaliana delay flowering by shortening stem length and reduction of leaf size. This expression shows that the near-null magnetic field has caused downregulation of several flowering genes, including FT genes in the meristem and leaves, which is cryptochrome related.

== Physiological mechanism ==
Although preliminary experiments have shown a wide range of effects due to the magnetic field, the mechanism has not yet been elucidated. Having known that the delay of flowering is downregulated in cryptochrome related genes affected by the near-null magnetic field under blue light, cryptochrome is taken as a potential magneto-sensor by a few considerations. Based on the radical pair model, cryptochrome would be the magneto-sensor in the light-dependent magnetoreception since cryptochrome has evolved a significant role of plant behavior, including blue-light reception and regulation, de-etiolation, circadian rhythm, and photolyase. In the photoactivation process, blue light hits cryptochrome and accepts a photon to Flavin while tryptophan receives a photon by another tryptophan donor simultaneously. Due to the geomagnetic field, this combination would rotate from south pole to north pole of the Earth and convert the two single photons back to its inactive resting states under aerobic environment. Based on a few behavior changes due to variations of the magnetic field, many plant scientists have paid attention to cryptochrome being the candidate for the magneto-sensory receptor. So far, the interactions between signals and magnetoreceptor molecules have not yet been discovered, thus leaving potential space for future research while understanding magnetotropism could be significant for improving life forms and ecology such as in agriculture.
