= Thigmomorphogenesis =

Biological response in plants

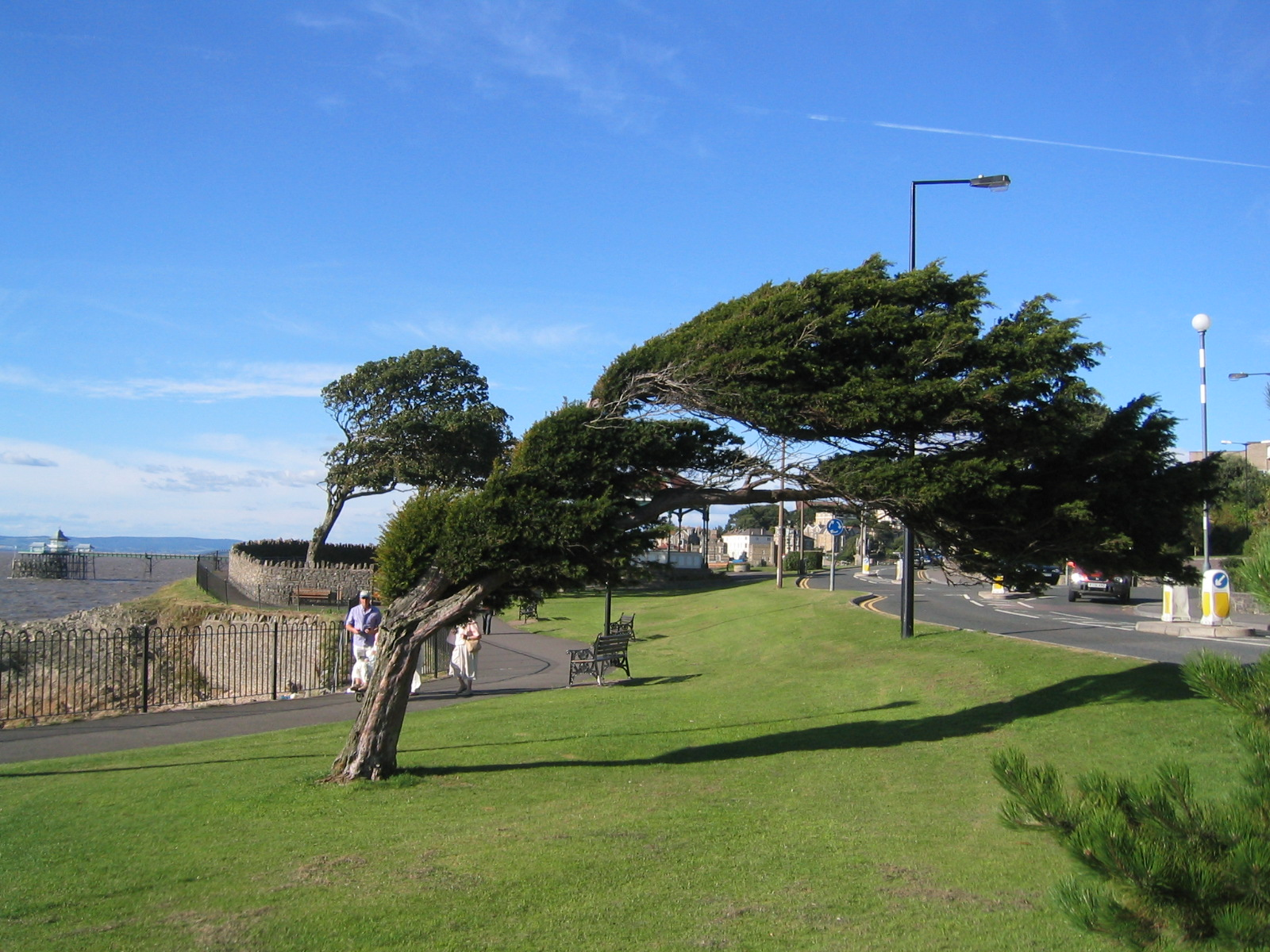
A tree that has grown sideways due to the wind

Thigmomorphogenesis involves plants altering their growth and development in response to mechanical stimuli, such as touch, wind, or rain. This process begins with the perception of mechanical forces by cellular mechanosensors, followed by their transduction into signal transduction pathways cascades, and culminating in changes in gene expression and hormone activity. The response integrates diverse molecular components, including mechanosensitive ion channels, receptor-like kinases, the cytoskeletal elements, phytohormones, and transcription factors, which collectively drive both immediate physiological and long-term morphological adaptations.

Early observations noted that greenhouse-grown plants were often taller and more slender than stockier plants grown outdoors, where they were exposed to natural mechanical stresses. The term "thigmomorphogenesis" is derived from Ancient Greek θιγγάνω (thingánō, "to touch"), μορφή (morphê, "shape"), and γένεσις (génesis, "creation").

== Mechanosensing ==
=== Cytoskeleton ===
The cytoskeleton, composed of microtubules and actin filaments, plays a vital role in plant mechanotransduction by linking mechanical stimuli to intracellular signal transduction. Microtubules are key components that detect mechanical forces and relay these signals within the cell. Disrupting microtubules with drugs like colchicine completely inhibits tendril coiling in Pisum sativum, demonstrating their essential role in responding to mechanical cues. The microtubule network interacts dynamically with the plasma membrane, influencing the activation of MCAs (MSCs) and other proteins involved in signaling. This interaction facilitates the rapid conversion of mechanical perturbations into biochemical responses critical for adaptive growth and stress resistance.

While actin filaments are less directly involved in initial mechanical sensing, they are crucial for maintaining cellular integrity and facilitating localized growth responses. During tendril coiling, for example, actin filaments help stabilize cytoskeletal architecture and direct asymmetric growth along the dorsal and ventral sides of the tendril. Disrupting actin does not inhibit the coiling response but affects turgor pressure, suggesting a supportive rather than primary role in mechanosensation. Together, the microtubule and actin networks provide a structural framework for the mechanotransduction machinery, ensuring efficient integration of external mechanical forces into the plant's development and physiology.

=== Receptor-like kinases ===
RLKss (RLKs), such as FERONIA (FER) and THESEUS1 (THE1), are critical components of the plant mechanosensation system, bridging extracellular mechanical stimuli with intracellular signaling. FER, a member of the Catharanthus roseus RLK1-like subfamily, has roles in sensing mechanical cues and maintaining cell wall integrity. Loss-of-function mutations in FER lead to impaired root growth under mechanically challenging conditions, such as compacted soil. FER also regulates cell wall mechanical properties by interacting with rapid alkalinization factors (RALFs), which influence pH and activate cell wall-modifying enzymes. This kinase integrates mechanical signals into growth and defense responses, allowing plants to adapt to mechanical stress while maintaining structural integrity. FER can activate voltage-gated calcium channels, facilitating cytosolic Ca²⁺ influx in response to mechanical perturbations. THE1, another RLK, specifically contributes to cell wall integrity signaling during mechanical stress by detecting cellulose biosynthesis defects and coordinating compensatory responses.

=== Mechanosensitive ion channels ===
MCAss are pivotal for detecting mechanical stimuli at the cellular level, acting as a primary response mechanism to mechanical perturbations. These transmembrane proteins convert physical forces into ionic fluxes, most commonly involving calcium ions (Ca²⁺), which serve as a universal second messenger in signal transduction pathways. MSC activity is triggered by changes in membrane tension and is essential for transducing mechanical signals into biochemical responses.

In plants, three major families of MCAss have been identified: MscS-like channels (MSLs), Mid1-complementing activity proteins (MCAs), and two-pore potassium (TPK) channels. The MSL family, which shares homology with bacterial MscS ion channelss, includes members such as MSL8, MSL9, and MSL10. These proteins are localized to various cellular membranes and respond to mechanical stress by gating ionic flux. Arabidopsis MSL8, for example, is expressed in pollen and regulates turgor pressure during hydration and germination. Mutations in MSL8 result in high rates of pollen bursting during hydration, highlighting its role as a turgor regulator. Similarly, MSL9 and MSL10 are expressed in root cells and play critical roles in mediating responses to osmotic and mechanical stress. These channels regulate ion fluxes across the plasma membrane, contributing to the plant's ability to adjust to changing environmental conditions. While MSL9 and MSL10 share similar gating properties, they appear to have distinct physiological roles, with MSL10 also implicated in reactive oxygen species (ROS) generation and stress signaling.

MCAs are another key family of MCAss, known for their role in enhancing Ca²⁺ influx upon mechanical perturbation. Arabidopsis MCA1 and MCA2 are localized to the plasma membrane and are essential for root penetration into hard or compacted soils. By gating Ca²⁺ influx, these channels facilitate downstream processes such as cytoskeletal rearrangements and hormone signaling that enable root growth under challenging conditions.

TPK channels, a less-studied but significant family, modulate potassium flux in response to mechanical forces. This activity influences guard cell function, root cell turgor, and other mechanical responses critical to maintaining cellular homeostasis under stress.

== Signal transduction ==
=== Calcium signaling ===
The rise in cytosolic Ca²⁺ levels following the activation of MCAss or RLKss is a crucial step in the plant's mechanotransduction response. This transient calcium influx is decoded by calcium-binding proteins, such as calmodulins (CaMs) and calmodulin-like proteins (CMLs), which regulate diverse downstream processes. In Arabidopsis, TCH genes, encoding CaMs and CMLs, are rapidly upregulated after mechanical stimulation, highlighting their central role in touch-responsive signaling.

These calcium-binding proteins activate effectors like calcium-dependent protein kinasess (CDPKs) and calcineurin B-like proteinss (CBLs), which fine-tune cellular responses such as ion transport, ROS generation, and gene expression. The rapid, transient nature of calcium spikes helps plants differentiate between fleeting disturbances and sustained forces, preventing overstimulation of downstream pathways. By integrating with other signaling pathways, including ROS and hormonal signaling, calcium signals orchestrate a coordinated response to mechanical stress.

=== Hormonal regulation ===
Phytohormones, particularly jasmonic acid (JA), ethylene, and auxin, are central regulators of the long-term developmental changes underlying thigmomorphogenesis. Among these, JA is a primary mediator, modulating gene expression and enhancing stress tolerance in response to mechanical stimuli. JA biosynthesis is essential for many thigmomorphogenic traits, as demonstrated by mutants deficient in allene oxide synthase (AOS), a key enzyme in the JA biosynthetic pathway, which exhibit impaired growth suppression and reduced radial expansion in mechanically stimulated plants. JA also strengthens plant defenses, linking mechanical perturbations to resistance against herbivory and pathogens. For example, wind-stimulated plants with elevated JA levels have shown enhanced pest resistance.

Ethylene and auxin complement JA by influencing cell elongation and asymmetric growth, both critical for thigmomorphogenesis. Ethylene production increases in mechanically stimulated plants and is linked to radial expansion and stem thickening, traits that enhance structural stability against mechanical forces like wind. Auxin, on the other hand, modulates differential growth responses, such as tendril coiling. In tendrils, JA and auxin establish opposing gradients, with JA promoting growth inhibition on one side and auxin stimulating elongation on the other, driving the coiling response.

=== Transcriptional regulation ===
Mechanical stimulation induces extensive transcriptional reprogramming in plants, driven by transcription factors such as calmodulin-binding transcription activators (CAMTAs) and MYC transcription factors. CAMTAs regulate JA-independent pathways, directly activating genes like TCH2 and TCH4, which are rapidly induced by touch and contribute to cell wall remodeling. These transcription factors bind to conserved promoter elements in touch-responsive genes, mediating precise transcriptional responses to mechanical stress. For instance, TCH4 encodes xyloglucan endotransglucosylase/hydrolase, a cell wall-modifying enzyme that facilitates growth adjustments under mechanical stress by loosening or reinforcing cell walls as needed.

In parallel, MYC transcription factors play a central role in JA-dependent transcriptional networks. These factors mediate the expression of genes involved in hormone biosynthesis, defense responses, and mechanical stress adaptation. Mutants deficient in MYC2, MYC3, and MYC4 exhibit impaired thigmomorphogenic responses, highlighting the importance of these transcription factors in integrating hormonal and mechanical signaling. MYC-regulated genes include those encoding jasmonate-responsive proteins, such as JAZ repressors, which modulate JA signaling pathways.

== Physiological relevance and adaptations ==
Thigmomorphogenesis enables plants to adapt their growth and development in response to mechanical stress by modulating structural and physiological traits. Key adaptations include reduced shoot elongation, increased stem thickness, enhanced root anchorage, and changes in flowering time. These responses collectively improve a plant's ability to withstand environmental challenges such as strong winds, heavy rainfall, and herbivory. For example, repeated mechanical stimulation suppresses internode elongation and promotes radial stem growth, resulting in shorter, sturdier plants better equipped to resist mechanical damage.

Enhanced lignification, a hallmark of thigmomorphogenesis, strengthens plant cell walls, contributing to mechanical resistance against environmental stressors. In species like Phaseolus vulgaris and Arabidopsis thaliana, mechanical stimulation induces enzymes involved in lignin biosynthesis, leading to thicker and more rigid stems. These structural changes also improve plant defenses against herbivory and pathogen invasion, as lignified tissues are more resistant to mechanical penetration by pests and microbes.

Delayed flowering is another adaptation linked to thigmomorphogenesis, allowing plants to allocate resources toward fortifying their structures before investing in reproduction. Touch-induced delays in flowering are regulated by hormonal pathways involving JA and gibberellin (GA). For instance, Arabidopsis plants subjected to mechanical stimulation exhibit lower bioactive GA levels and higher JA levels, both of which contribute to delayed floral transition and enhanced resilience.

Mechanosensory responses also enhance root anchorage, crucial for stabilizing plants against mechanical forces such as wind. Mechanical stimulation increases root dry weight and branching, likely mediated by changes in auxin and ethylene signaling pathways. In environments with compacted soils, MCAss facilitate calcium-dependent responses that promote root penetration and growth. Together, these changes optimize root architecture for effective water and nutrient uptake while resisting uprooting by mechanical stresses.

These physiological adaptations underscore the evolutionary significance of thigmomorphogenesis as a survival strategy. By integrating mechanical signals with growth and defense pathways, plants achieve a balance between structural reinforcement, stress tolerance, and resource allocation. This dynamic response enhances individual fitness and contributes to the ecological success of plants in diverse and fluctuating environments.

== See also ==
- Thigmotropism
