= Siphonogamy =

Type of fertilization occurred in the Spermatophytes

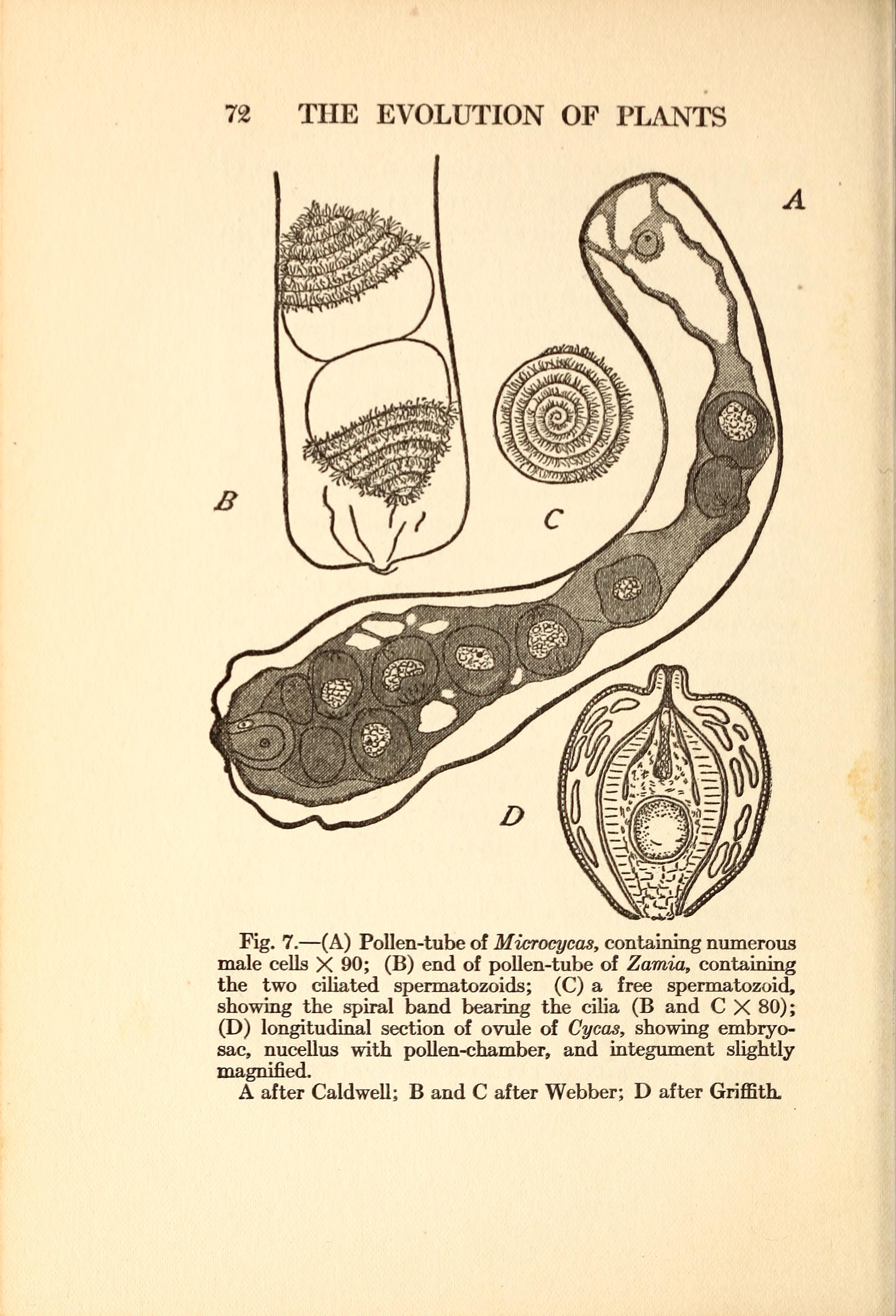
Pollen tubes, sperm, and ovule of Cycadophyta

Siphonogamy is a condition in which non-motile sperm are transported to the egg through a microscopic pollen tube. The innovation is universal among seed plants (the spermatophytes) and contrasts with the free-swimming gametes of bryophytes, pteridophytes and many algal groups.

== Evolutionary context and significance ==
Land plants originally relied on water films for fertilisation; even today, the motile sperm of mosses and ferns are restricted to moist microhabitats. During the late Palaeozoic, gymnosperms and, later, angiosperms evolved siphonogamy, freeing sexual reproduction from this constraint. By delivering sperm directly to the ovule, the nascent pollen tube eliminated the need for external water at the moment of fertilisation, permitting seed plants to inhabit drier terrestrial niches and making large, enclosed seeds possible.

Comparative developmental studies indicate that the pollen tube was co-opted for sperm delivery more than once: phylogenetic analyses suggest independent origins in the conifer–gnetophyte lineage and in the earliest angiosperms. Extant cycads and Ginkgo biloba retain ancestral flagellated sperm that swim a short distance after the tube ruptures, whereas conifers, gnetophytes and all flowering plants carry non-motile gametes the entire way, demonstrating a mosaic of transitional states within gymnosperms.

The rise of siphonogamy was accompanied by a radical reduction of the free-living gametophyte generations: the male gametophyte is now condensed into just a few cells inside a pollen grain, while the female gametophyte is retained within the ovule. Together with the origin of the carpel in angiosperms, these life-cycle modifications underpin the ecological dominance of seed plants in modern floras.

== Mechanism in seed plants ==
Siphonogamy begins when a pollen grain adheres to the receptive stigma. If conditions are favourable, it hydrates and germinates, producing a tube that invades the stigma tissue and grows through the style toward the ovary. The tube's directional growth is directed by a complex exchange of chemical signals between haploid pollen cells and surrounding diploid sporophytic tissues.

Growth rates differ markedly among plant groups. In angiosperms, pollen tubes routinely exceed 3 micrometres (μm) per second (about 10 mm/hour), enabling double fertilisation within hours; most conifer tubes, by contrast, elongate at less than 20 μm/hour and may take days to reach the archegonia. Angiosperm tubes are typically unbranched, but some taxa (e.g., Cucurbitaceae) produce haustorial side branches that tap maternal tissues for nutrients before fertilisation.

Upon reaching an ovule, the tube enters the embryo sac and releases two sperm. In angiosperms one sperm fuses with the egg to form the zygote, while the other unites with the central cell to produce the triploid endosperm (double fertilisation). In most gymnosperms only a single fertilisation event occurs, but both groups share the same pollen tube delivery system, emphasising the deep evolutionary unity of siphonogamy across the seed-plant clade.
