= Nastic movements =

Undirected movement in response to external stimuli

Photonastic movement of Oxalis triangularis in response to light. At lowered light levels the leaves fold down; timelapse recorded at ~750x actual speed and covering a 1.5 hr period of time.

In biology, nastic movements are non-directional responses to stimuli (e.g. temperature, humidity, light irradiance) that occur more rapidly than tropisms and are usually associated with plants. The movement can be due to changes in turgor (internal pressure within plant cells). Decrease in turgor pressure causes shrinkage, while increase in turgor pressure brings about swelling.

Nastic movements differ from tropic movements in that the direction of tropic responses depends on the direction of the stimulus, whereas the direction of nastic movements is independent of the stimulus's position. The tropic movement is growth movement but nastic movement may or may not be growth movement. The rate or frequency of these responses increases as intensity of the stimulus increases.

An example of such a response is the opening and closing of flowers (photonastic response), movement of euglena, chlamydomonas towards the source of light.

== Types of stimuli ==
Types of nastic movement are named with the suffix -nasty and have prefixes that depend on the stimuli:

- Epinasty: downward-bending from growth at the top, for example, the bending down of a heavy flower.
- Hyponasty: upward bending of leaves from growth in the petiole (leaf stalk)
- Photonasty: response to light
- Nyctinasty: movements at night or in the dark
- Chemonasty: response to chemicals or nutrients
- Hydronasty: response to water
- Thermonasty: response to temperature
- Seismonasty: response to shock
- Geonasty/gravinasty: response to gravity
- Thigmonasty/seismonasty/haptonasty: response to contact

The suffix may come from Greek νάσσω = 'I press', ναστός = 'pressed', ἐπιναστια = 'the condition of being pressed upon'.

== See also ==
- Taxis – Directed movement of a motile cell or organism in response to an external stimulus
- Kinesis – Activity of an organism in response to a stimuli
