= Paraheliotropism =

Phenomenon in plants

Paraheliotropism refers to the phenomenon in which plants orient their leaves parallel to incoming rays of light, usually as a means of minimizing excess light absorption. Excess light absorption can cause a variety of physiological problems for plants, including overheating, dehydration, loss of turgor, photoinhibition, photo-oxidation, and photorespiration, so paraheliotropism can be viewed as an advantageous behavior in high light environments. Not all plants exhibit this behavior, but it has developed in multiple lineages (e.g., both Styrax camporum and Phaseolus vulgaris exhibit paraheliotropic movement).

== Physiological basis ==
While all mechanistic aspects of this behavior have yet to be elucidated (e.g., evidence indicates differential gene expression is involved, but the specifics have yet to be determined), many of the physiological aspects of paraheliotropic movement, at least in Phaseolus vulgaris (the common bean), are well understood. In this plant, daily leaf movements are influenced by two main factors: an endogenous circadian oscillator and light-induced signals. Physically, the movement is carried out by turgor-dependent changes in the volume of cortical parenchyma cells (called motor cells) in a turgor-sensitive part of the plant called the pulvinus, located at the juncture of the leaf base and the petiole. The cumulative effect of volume-changes in these motor cells manifests itself on the tissue/organ level as a swelling or shrinking of one or both sides of the pulvinus, which results in the reorientation of the adjacent leaf. Potassium and chloride have been shown to be the major osmolytes involved in the process, and plasma membrane-located proton pumps and ion transporters have been shown to play a critical role in creating osmotic potential. The hormones IAA and ABA are also involved in the process and play antagonistic roles, with IAA inducing pulvinar swelling and ABA inducing pulvinar shrinking. Blue light has also been shown to induce rapid pulvinar shrinking.

== As an adaptive behavior ==
Plants require light to perform photosynthesis, but receiving too much light can be just as damaging for a plant as receiving not enough light. An excess of light leads to three main overarching physiological problems: a surplus of photochemical energy leads to the creation of reactive oxygen species, which are extremely damaging to numerous cellular structures; the temperature of the plant's cells becomes so high that proteins denature and/or that enzyme kinetics are negatively impacted; and transpiration increases, resulting in losses of turgor and photochemical efficiency. Paraheliotropic movement can help a plant avoid these problems by limiting the amount of light that is actually absorbed by the plant; when leaves are positioned parallel to incoming light, they intercept just a small fraction of the photons that they would intercept if they were positioned perpendicular to the incoming light. So in essence, paraheliotropic plants avoid the physiological consequences of excess light by simply avoiding light. In 2003, Bielenberg et al. used two Phaseolus species, a quantum sensor, a light meter, a thermocouple meter, and an inclinometer to quantitatively demonstrate the effectiveness of this approach: leaves that displayed paraheliotropic behavior experienced lower photon flux densities (light intensity), lower temperatures, and higher water-use efficiency.
