= Pollen tube =

Tubular structure to conduct male gametes of plants to the female gametes

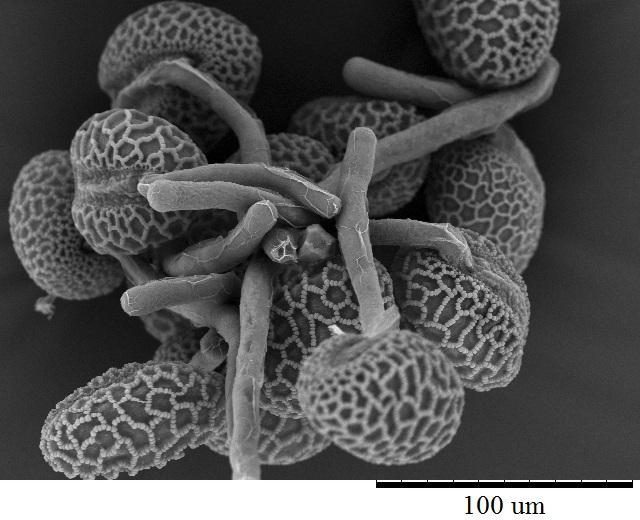
SEM image of pollen tubes growing from lily pollen grains.

A pollen tube is a tubular structure produced by the male gametophyte of seed plants when it germinates. Pollen tube elongation is an integral stage in the plant life cycle. The pollen tube acts as a conduit to transport the male gamete cells from the pollen grain—either from the stigma (in flowering plants) to the ovules at the base of the pistil or directly through ovule tissue in some gymnosperms. In maize, this single cell can grow longer than 12 inches (30 cm) to traverse the length of the pistil.

Pollen tubes were first discovered by Giovanni Battista Amici in the 19th century.

They are used as a model for understanding plant cell behavior. Research is ongoing to comprehend how the pollen tube responds to extracellular guidance signals to achieve fertilization.

Bee pollinating a sunflower. Pollen is transferred from anther of one plant to stigma of another as bee collects nectar

Pollen tubes are unique to seed plants and their structures have evolved over their history since the Carboniferous period. Pollen tube formation is complex and the mechanism is not fully understood.

== Angiosperms ==
Angiosperm life cycle.

The male reproductive organ of the flower, the stamen, produces pollen. The opening of anthers makes pollen available for subsequent pollination (transfer of pollen grains to the pistil, the female reproductive organ). Each pollen grain contains a vegetative cell, and a generative cell that divides to form two sperm cells. Abiotic vectors such as wind, water, or biotic vectors such as animals carry out the pollen distribution.

Once a pollen grain settles on a compatible pistil, it may germinate in response to a sugary fluid secreted by the mature stigma. Lipids at the surface of the stigma may also stimulate pollen tube growth for compatible pollen. Plants that are self-sterile often inhibit the pollen grains from their own flowers from growing pollen tubes. The presence of multiple grains of pollen has been observed to stimulate quicker pollen tube growth in some plants. The vegetative cell then produces the pollen tube, a tubular protrusion from the pollen grain, which carries the sperm cells within its cytoplasm. The sperm cells are the male gametes that will join with the egg cell and the central cell in double fertilization. The first fertilization event produces a diploid zygote and the second fertilization event produces a triploid endosperm.

The germinated pollen tube must drill its way through the nutrient-rich style and curl to the bottom of the ovary to reach an ovule. Once the pollen tube reaches an ovule, it bursts to deliver the two sperm cells. One of the sperm cells fertilizes the egg cell which develops into an embryo, which will become the future plant. The other one fuses with both polar nuclei of the central cell to form the endosperm, which serves as the embryo's food supply. Finally, the ovary will develop into a fruit and the ovules will develop into seeds.

== Gymnosperms ==
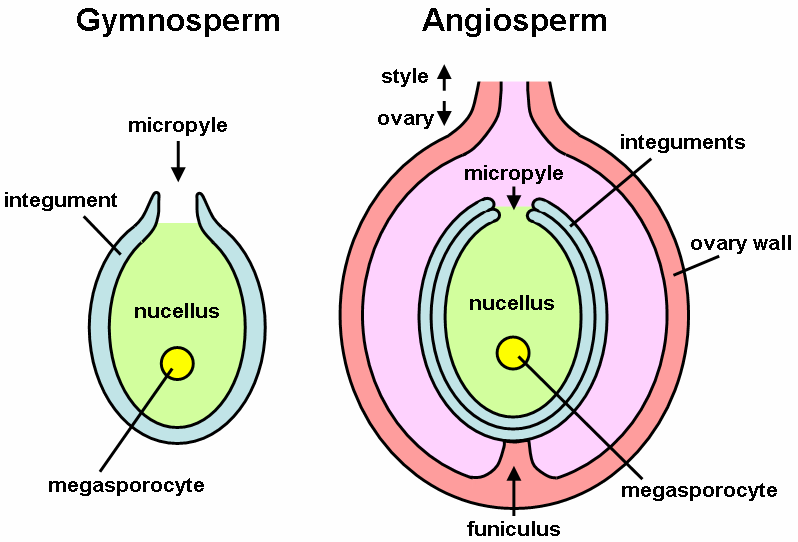
Cross section of ovule in gymnosperms and angiosperms

Gymnosperm pollen is produced in microsporangia borne on the scales of the male cone or microstrobilus. In most species, the plants are wind-pollinated, and the pollen grains of conifers have air bladders that provide buoyancy in air currents. The grains are deposited in the micropyle of the ovule of a female cone or megastrobilus, where they mature for up to a year. In conifers and gnetophytes, the pollen germinate to produce a pollen tube that penetrates the megasporangium or nucellus carrying with it sperm nuclei that are transferred to the egg cell in the developing archegonia of the female plant.

== Mechanism of pollen tube growth ==
=== Recognition ===
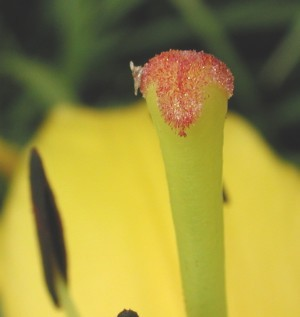
Pollen on stigma

The female sporophyte must recognize the pollen stuck to the stigma. Often, only pollen of the same species can successfully grow. Outcrossed pollen grows more successfully. With self-incompatibility systems, outcrossed pollen grows and outcompetes self pollen. The interaction between the style and the pollen detects compatibility and influences growth rate of the pollen tube. This selection process relies on gene level regulation in which gene loci of the gynoecium allow either self-pollen to grow slowly, stop growing or burst while faster growth of outcrossed pollen occurs. Self-incompatibility systems maintain genetic diversity. As for gymnosperms, they do not contain a pistil with a stigma. Therefore, pollen must submerge into the pollination droplet, bringing the male gametophyte to the egg of the exposed ovule. However, pollen of different species will not submerge into the droplet; the pollen is left floating on top, while the droplet retracts back into the micropyle.

=== Initiation ===
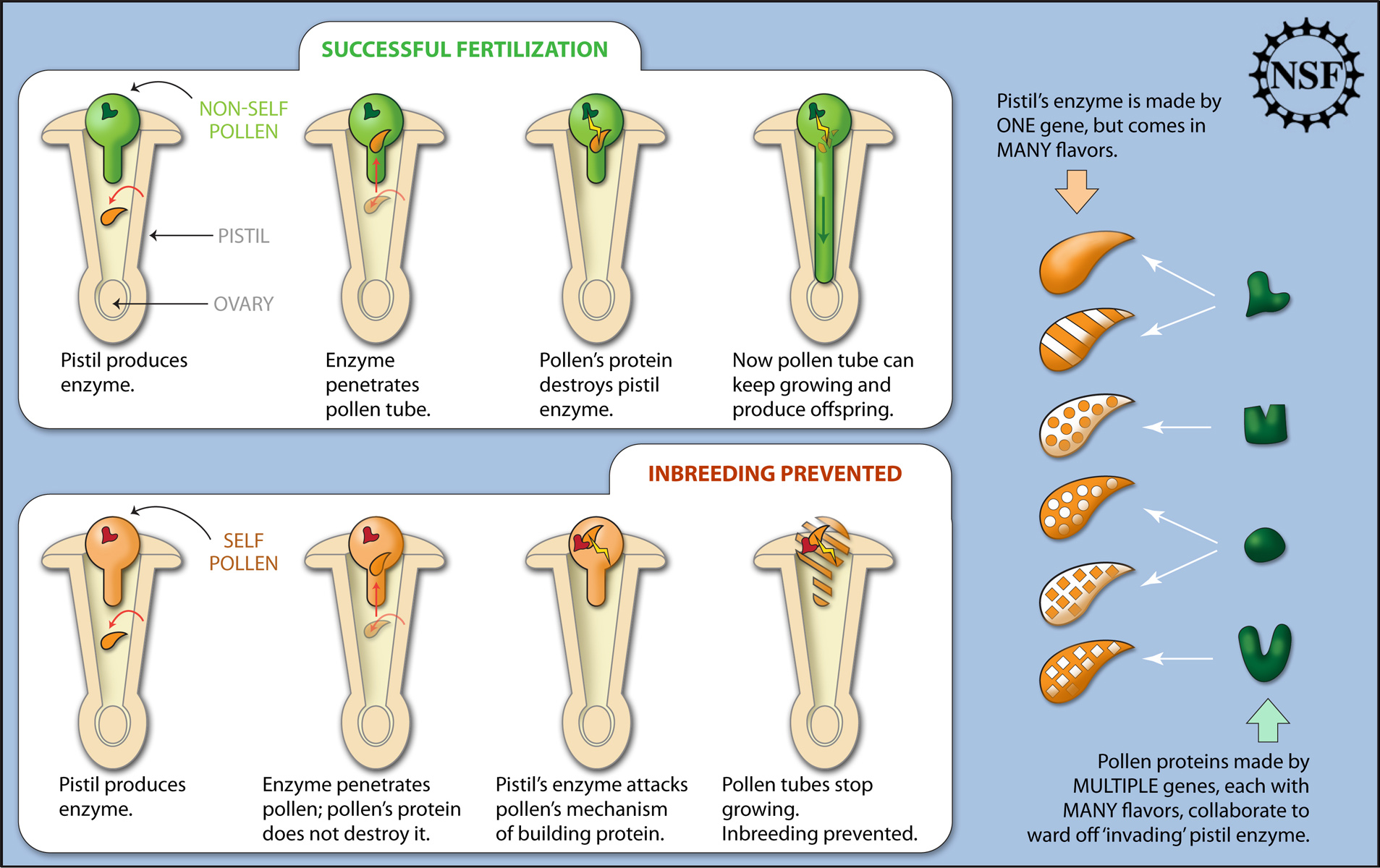
Mechanism to prevent self pollination and allowing compatible pollen to grow a pollen tube for fertilization to take place

Once the pollen grain is recognized and hydrated, the pollen grain germinates to grow a pollen tube. There is competition in this step as many pollen grains may compete to reach the egg. The stigma plays a role in guiding the sperm to a receptive ovule, in the case of many ovules. Only compatible pollen grains are allowed to grow as determined by signaling with the stigma.

In the pollen grain, the generative cell gives rise to the sperm, whereas the vegetative cells have a tube cell that grows the pollen tube. Some plants have mechanisms in place to prevent self pollination, such as having stigma and anther mature at different times or being of different lengths, which significantly contributes to increasing genetic diversity of the next generation.

There is great variation in the rate of growth of pollen tubes and many studies have focused on signaling. The gene expression in the pollen grain has been identified as that of the gametophyte and not of the parental sporophyte, as it expresses its own unique mRNA and enzymes. In the peach tree, the style environment which the pollen tube grows through provides nutrition for the tube's growth to the ovule. Pollen tubes are tolerant and even pollen damaged by X-rays and gamma rays can still grow pollen tubes.

=== Growth and signaling ===
Structure of a typical angiosperm ovule

Pollen tube growth is influenced by the interaction between the stigma-style and the pollen grain. The elongation of the tube is achieved with elongation of the cytoskeleton and it extends from the tip, which is regulated by high levels of calcium in the cytosol. The calcium levels help the synaptic vesicles in the membranes grow and extend at the tip. Polypeptides found in the style also regulate growth of the tube and specific peptides that play a role in signaling for growth have been identified.

The LURE peptides that are secreted from the synergids, which occupy the space adjacent to the egg cell, can use attractants. In mutant Arabidopsis plant embryos, specifically in those without the synergids, the pollen tubes were unable to grow. Pollen tube growth is toward eggs of the same species as the pollen. Intraspecific signaling helps fertilize egg and sperm of the same species. The signaling in the style is important as pollen tubes can grow without the presence of an embryo sac with just interaction with the style. Other parts in the ovary include cytoplasmic factors like miRNA and chemical gradients that attract the pollen tube to grow toward the synergids.

Calcium and ethylene in Arabidopsis thaliana are involved in termination of the pollen tube when it grows near the ovary. The increase in calcium allows the release of the two sperm cells from the tube as well as degeneration of a synergid cell. The chemical gradient of calcium can also contribute to termination early on in tube growth or at the appropriate time.

The length of the pollen tube varies by species. It grows in an oscillating fashion until it is ready to release the sperm near the egg for fertilization to take place. Some fast-growing pollen tubes have been observed in lily, tobacco, and Impatiens sultanii. The rate of growth confers advantage to the organism but it is not clear whether the variation in growth rate exists in the population or has been selected for over generations due to increased fitness.

=== Evolution ===
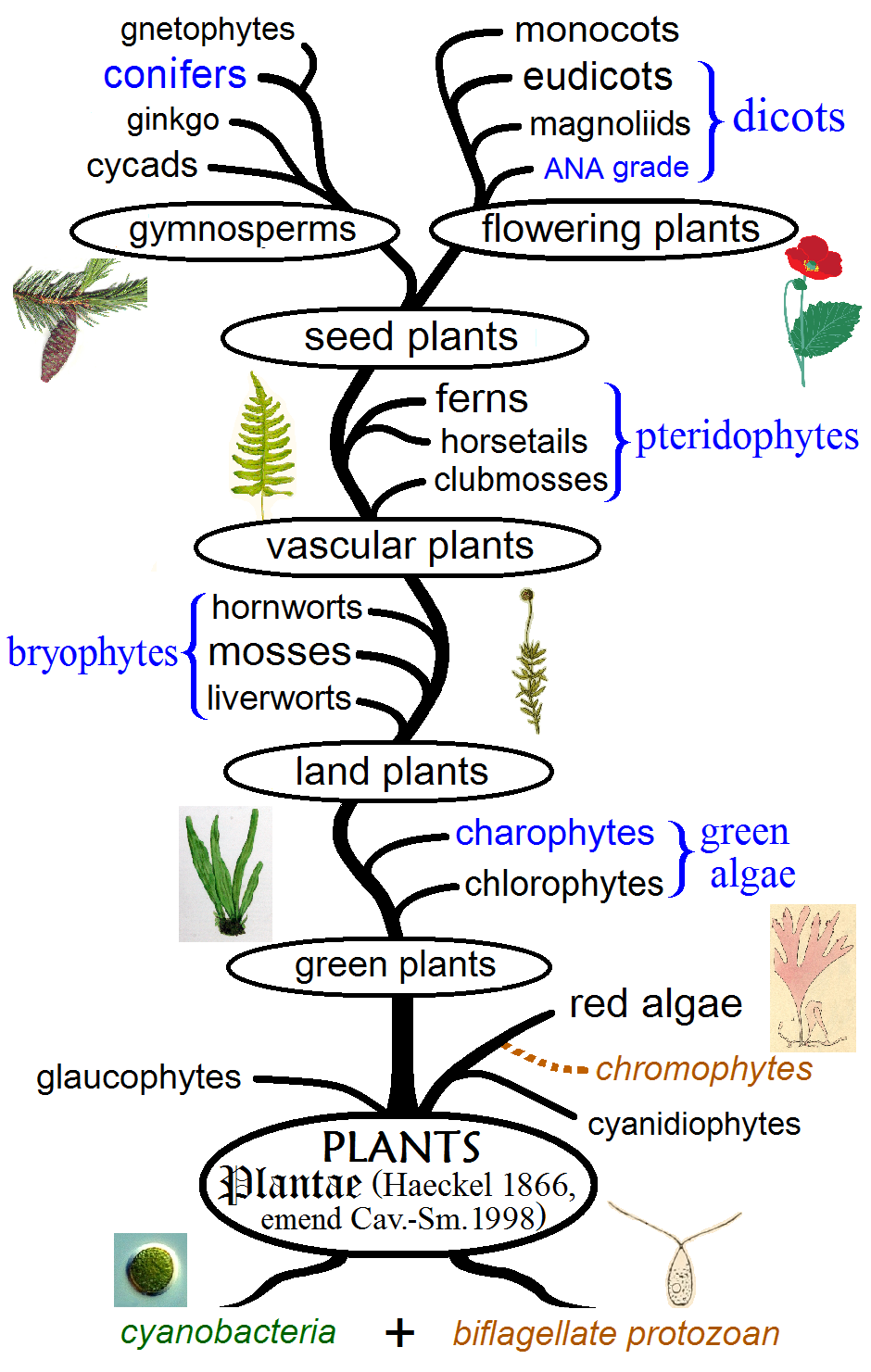
Gymnoperms in perspective on the phylogeny

Many transitional features have been identified that show correlation between the evolution of the pollen tube with that of a non-motile sperm. Early seed plants like ferns have spores and motile sperm that swim in a water medium, called zooidogamy. The angiosperm pollen tube is simple, unbranched, and fast growing, however this is not the case for ancestral plants.

In gymnosperms like Ginkgo biloba and cycadophyta, a haustorial pollen tube forms. The tube simply soaks up nutrients from the female nucellus and grows in two stages. The pollen tube is highly branched and grows on the female sporophyte tissues. First, it grows the main tube followed by a more spherical tip at the end to allow the sperm to burst near the archegonia. The binucleated, multiflagellated sperm can then swim to the egg. Cycads have a less branched structured and the tip end swells the same way as in the ginkgo. In cycads, however, various enzymes have been identified in the pollen tube that direct growth and the nucellus tissues are more damaged with the tube growth.

In other phyla of gymnosperms, the Coniferophyta and Gnetophyta, the sperm is non motile, and the pollen tube delivers the sperm to the egg directly, in a process called siphonogamy. Conifers can be branched or unbranched and they cause degeneration of the female tissue as it grows through more tissue. Pines, for instance discharge cytoplasm of the sperm and union of the one sperm occurs as the other sperm degenerates. Yet, in Gnetophyta, there are features more similar to angiosperm pollen tubes where the tube reaches the egg with an early form of double fertilization. However, the endosperm does not form and the second fertilization is aborted.

In angiosperms, the mechanism has been studied more extensively as pollen tubes in flowering plants grow very fast through long styles to reach the well-protected egg. There is great variation in pollen tubes in angiosperms and many model plants like petunia, Arabidopsis, lily and tobacco plants have been studied for intraspecific variation and signaling mechanisms. In flowering plants, a phenomenon called polyamory can occur where many ovules are fertilized and overall fitness of the organism is yet to be studied with respect to rate of pollen tube growth.

== Behavior ==
Pollen tubes are an excellent model for the understanding of plant cell behavior. They are easily cultivated in vitro and have a very dynamic cytoskeleton that polymerizes at very high rates, providing the pollen tube with interesting mechanical properties. The pollen tube has an unusual kind of growth; it extends exclusively at its apex. Extending the cell wall only at the tip minimizes friction between the tube and the invaded tissue. This tip growth is performed in a pulsating manner rather than in a steady fashion. The pollen tube's journey through the style often results in depth-to-diameter ratios above 100:1 and up to 1000:1 in certain species. In maize, this single cell can grow longer than 12 inches (30 cm) to traverse the length of the pistil. The internal machinery and the external interactions that govern the dynamics of pollen tube growth are far from being fully understood.

=== Role of actin cytoskeleton ===
The actin cytoskeleton has proven to be critical in assisting pollen tube growth. In terms of spatial distribution, actin filaments are arranged into three different structures within the pollen tube. Each unique arrangement, or pattern, contributes to the maintenance of polarized cell growth characteristic of the pollen tube. In the apical region - the site of tip-directed growth- actin filaments are less abundant, however they are highly dynamic. Furthermore, small vesicles accumulate in the apex, indicating that this region is the site of critical vesicle targeting and fusing events. Such events are essential for regulating the velocity and direction of pollen tube growth. In the subapical region, actin filaments are arranged into a collar-like structure. Reverse-fountain cytoplasmic streaming occurs at the subapex; the direction of cytoplasmic streaming is reversed and continues along the axial actin cables comprising the shank. The shank region comprises the central part of the pollen tube. In this region, actin filaments are arranged into axial bundles of uniform polarity, thereby enabling the transport of various organelles and vesicles from the base of the pollen tube to the tip, propelling overall tube growth.

=== Actin filament dynamics ===
Both the spatial distribution and dynamics of the actin cytoskeleton are regulated by actin-binding proteins (ABPs). In order to experimentally observe distributional changes that take place in the actin cytoskeleton during pollen tube growth, green fluorescent proteins (GFPs) have been put to use. GFPs were mainly selected for the purposes of dynamic visualization due to the fact that they provided an efficient means for the non-invasive imaging of actin filaments in plants. Amongst the various GFPs employed during experimentation were GFP-mTalin, LIM-GFP and GFP-fimbrin/ABD2-GFP. However, each of these markers either disrupted the natural structure of the actin filaments or unfavorably labeled such filaments. For example, GFP-mTalin resulted in excessive filament bundling and GFP-fimbrin/ABD2-GFP did not label actin filaments located in the apical or subapical regions of the pollen tube. In light of these drawbacks, Lifeact-mEGFP has been designated as the prominent marker of choice for actin filaments in the pollen tube; Lifeact-mEGFP is able to detect all three arrangements of actin filaments, and it has minimal effects on the natural structure of actin filaments. Lifeact-mEGFP has been used as a marker to study the dynamics of actin filaments in the growing pollen tubes of tobacco, lilies and Arabidopsis.

Through studies conducted with GFP, it has been confirmed that the dynamic state of actin filaments located in the apical region are essential for pollen tube growth. Experimentation of actin filaments stained with GFP-mTalin have yielded results confirming that tip-localized actin filaments are highly dynamic. Such experimentation has made a connection between the dynamics of tip-localized actin filaments and their role in the formation of actin structures in the subapical region. Furthermore, experimentation of actin filaments located in the apical dome of Arabidopsis indicates that actin filaments are continuously produced from the apical membrane of the pollen tube; the production of these actin filaments are mediated by formins. These findings have provided evidence supporting the theory that actin filaments located in the apical region are highly dynamic and are the site of vesicle targeting and fusing events. Experimentation of etiolated hypocotyl cells as well as BY-2 suspension cells show that highly dynamic actin filaments produced from the apical membrane can either be turned over by filament severing and depolarizing events, or they can move from the apex to the apical flank, resulting in decreased accumulation of actin filaments in the apical region of the pollen tube.

Experimentation of actin filament dynamics in the shank region were also conducted with the use of GFP. Findings indicated that maximum filament length in this region significantly increased, and the severing frequency significantly decreased. Such findings indicate that actin filaments located in the shank region are relatively stable compared to actin filaments located in the apical and subapical regions.

=== Regulation ===
ABPs regulate the organization and dynamics of the actin cytoskeleton. As stated previously, actin filaments are continuously synthesized from the apical membrane. This indicates the presence of membrane-anchored actin nucleation factors. Through experimentation, it has been theorized that formins are representative of such actin nucleation factors. For example, formin AtFH5 has been identified as a major regulator of actin filament nucleation, specifically for actin filaments synthesized from the apical membrane of the pollen tube. Genetic knockouts of AtFH5 resulted in a decreased abundance of actin filaments in both apical and subapical regions of the pollen tube, thereby providing more evidence to support the theory that AtFH5 nucleates actin filament assembly in apical and subapical regions of the pollen tube.

Class I formin AtFH3 is another actin nucleation factor. AtFH3 nucleates actin filament assembly of the longitudinal actin cables located in the shank region of the pollen tube. More specifically, AtFH3 uses the actin/profilin complex in order to interact with the end of actin filaments, thereby initiating actin filament nucleation.

=== Guidance ===
Extensive work has been dedicated to comprehend how the pollen tube responds to extracellular guidance signals to achieve fertilization. Pollen tubes react to a combination of chemical, electrical, and mechanical cues during their journey through the pistil. However, it is not clear how these external cues work or how they are processed internally. Moreover, sensory receptors for any external cue have not been identified yet. Nevertheless, several aspects have already been identified as central in the process of pollen tube growth. The actin filaments in the cytoskeleton, the peculiar cell wall, secretory vesicle dynamics, and the flux of ions, to name a few, are some of the fundamental features readily identified as crucial, but whose role has not yet been completely elucidated.

=== DNA repair ===
During pollen tube growth, DNA damages that arise need to be repaired in order for the male genomic information to be transmitted intact to the next generation. In the plant Cyrtanthus mackenii, bicellular mature pollen contains a generative cell and a vegetative cell. Sperm cells are derived by mitosis of the generative cell during pollen tube elongation. The vegetative cell is responsible for pollen tube development. Double-strand breaks in DNA that arise appear to be efficiently repaired in the generative cell, but not in the vegetative cell, during the transport process to the female gametophyte.

== RMD Actin filament organization is a contributor to pollen tube growth ==
=== Overview ===
In order for fertilization to occur, there is rapid tip growth in pollen tubes which delivers the male gametes into the ovules. A pollen tube consists of three different regions: the apex which is the growth region, the subapex which is the transition region, and the shank which acts like normal plant cells with the specific organelles. The apex region is where tip growth occurs and requires the fusion of secretory vesicles. There is mostly pectin and homogalacturonans (part of the cell wall at the pollen tube tip) inside these vesicles. The pectin in the apex region contains methylesters which allow for flexibility, before the enzyme pectin methylesterase removes the methylester groups allowing calcium to bind between pectins and give structural support. The homogalacturonans accumulate in the apex region via exocytosis in order to loosen the cell wall. A thicker and softer tip wall with a lower stress yield will form and this allows cell expansion to occur, which leads to an increase in tip growth. Reverse-fountain cytoplasmic streaming occurs during the tip growth which is essential for the cellular expansion, because it is transporting organelles and vesicles between the shank region and subapex region.

The actin cytoskeleton is an important factor in pollen tube growth, because there are different patterns of actin cytoskeleton within the different regions of the pollen tube for the maintenance of polarized cell growth. For instance, there are longitudinal actin cables in the shank region in order to regulate reverse-fountain cytoplasmic streaming. The F-actin controls the accumulation of the homogalacturonans full vesicles- essentially mediating tip growth- in the subapex region. The actin filaments control the apical membrane and cytoplasm interactions while the pollen tube is growing in the apex region. The F-actin from the apical membrane makes an actin binding protein called formin which is essential for pollen tube tip growth. Formins are expressed in the tip growth cells and are divided into two subgroups: type I and type II. The type I formins make the actin structures and partake in cytokinesis. The type II formins on the other hand contribute to the growth of polarized cells which is necessary for tip growth. Tip growth is a form of extreme polarized growth and this polarized process requires actin-binding protein-mediated organization of actin cytoskeleton. An essential protein required for this tip growth is the actin-organizing protein and type II formin protein called Rice Morphology Determinant (RMD). RMD is localized in the tip of the pollen tube and controls pollen tube growth by regulating the polarity and organization of F-actin array.

=== RMD promotes pollen tube growth ===
RMD promotes pollen germination and pollen tube growth, and this is proven through numerous experiments. The first experiment compares the features of the pistil and the stigma of rmd-1 mutant (rice plant without a functional RMD) and the wild-type rice plant (with a functional RMD). The anther and pistil were shorter in the rmd-1 mutants than the wild-type. This experiment showed that RMD is critical for pollen development. Wild-type rice plants have increased germination rates while rmd-1 mutants have decreased germination rates. This was seen when both were germinated in a liquid germination medium. After the germination rates were tested, there was a comparison of the lengths and widths of the pollen tubes between the two plants. The pollen tubes of the wild-type plants had a greater pollen tube length than the mutants, but the mutants had a greater tube width. This greater pollen tube width within the mutants indicates the decrease in the growth of polarized cells and thus decrease in tip growth. Next, pollen grains from the wild type and mutants were collected to compare the pollination activities between the wild types and mutants. There was decreased activity and minimal penetration within the mutants whereas an increased activity and penetration through the style and to the bottom of the pistils within the wild types. These observations indicated the delayed pollen tube growth in the rmd-1 mutants. Additionally, there was no effect on fertilization rates between the wild type and the mutant and this was tested by measuring the seed-setting rates between the wild type and mutant. It was found that both had similar seed-setting rates. Therefore, RMD does not affect fertilization and has an effect only on tip growth.

=== RMD expression in the pollen tube ===
Total RNA extractions from the whole flower, lemma, palea, lodicule, pistil, anther, and mature pollen grains of the wild type plants took place in order to discover where RMD is specifically expressed in the plant as a whole. Using RT-qPCR (reverse transcription quantitative PCR), it was evident that there were different amounts of RMD transcripts within each part of the plant. And then it was evident where RMD was present in each part of the plant using RT-PCR (reverse transcription PCR) and using UBIQUITIN as a control. These two methods demonstrated that there was an abundant presence of the RMD transcripts in the lemma, pistil, anther, and mature pollen grains. In order to confirm these results, another method was performed. This method used transgenic plants that had an RMD promoter region fused with a reporter gene encoding GUS. Histochemical staining of the tissues of these transgenic plants then showed high GUS activity within the pistil, anther wall, and mature pollen grains. Therefore, these combined results demonstrated that RMD is expressed in these specific organs of the plant.

Detection of GUS signals were employed once again in order to study where RMD is specifically expressed within the pollen tube. First, pollen grains were collected from proRMD::GUS trangenic plants, and it was noted that there was a strong GUS signal within these mature pollen grains. These pollen grains were then germinated in vitro and GUS signals were observed within the tip growth of the pollen tubes. However, the strength of these GUS signals varied at different germination stages. The GUS signals were weak within the pollen tube tip at the early germination stage, but stronger at the later germination stages. Therefore, these results support that RMD is involved in pollen germination and pollen tube growth.

=== RMD localization in the pollen tube ===
RMD, which are type II formins, consist of a phosphatase, (PTEN)-like domain (responsible for protein localization), and FH1 and FH2 domains (promotes actin polymerization). In order to discover the localization of RMD in the pollen tube, transient assays of growing pollen tubes of tobacco was performed and the fluorescent protein-GFP was used. Many confocal images of various pollen tubes under specific conditions were observed: pLat52::eGFP (single eGFP driven by the pollen specific Lat52 promoter and this acts as a control); pLat52::RMD-eGFP (RMD protein fused with eGFP); pLat52::PTEN-eGFP (the PTEN domain fused with eGFP); and pLat52::FH1FH2-eGFP (the FH1 and FH2 domains fused with eGFP). By comparing the images of the control with pLat52::RMD-eGFP, it is observed that the single GFP was spread throughout the entire tube whereas RMD-eGFP accumulated in the tip region of the tube. Therefore, this shows that RMD is localized within the tip of the pollen tube.

In order to discover whether the PTEN-like domain is responsible for the localization of RMD, there was a comparison between the confocal images of GFP fused with PTEN domain and shortened RMD without the PTEN domain (pLat52::FH1FH2-eGFP). The PTEN-eGFP signals were localized in the tip of the pollen tubes like the RMD-eGFP signals, whereas the FH1FH2-eGFP signals were present throughout the pollen tube and not localized in a polar manner. Therefore, these combined results demonstrate that the PTEN-like domain is responsible for the tip localization of RMD in the pollen tubes.

=== RMD controls F-Actin distribution and polarity in the pollen tube ===
In order to determine if RMD controls F-actin organization within the pollen tube, F-actin arrays in wild type and rmd-1 mature pollen grains were observed using Alexa Fluor 488-phalloidin staining. Strongly bundled actin filaments were present around the apertures of the wild type pollen grains although there was no accumulation of actin filaments around the apertures in the rmd-1 pollen grains. Additionally, there were weak signals and random organization of the actin filaments within the rmd-1 pollen grain. Therefore, these results support that RMD is essential for controlling pollen germination.

Fluorescent intensity was measured using statistical analysis in order to observe the actin filament densities within the pollen tubes. There was greater fluorescence intensity in the shank region of the rmd-mutant tubes which means there was a higher density of F-actin within this region. But, there was a lower density of F-actin observed in the tip region of the rmd-mutant tubes compared to the wild type tubes. This demonstrates that the F-actin distribution pattern of pollen tubes is altered without a functional RMD.

In order to determine the polarity of the actin cables, the angles between the actin cables and elongation axis of the pollen tube were measured. The angles in the shank region of the wild type pollen tubes were predominantly less than 20° whereas the angles for the rmd-mutant pollen tubes were greater than 60°. These results support the fact that RMD is essential for polarized tip growth, because the rmd-mutant pollen tubes (without a functional RMD) exhibited an increased width, and thus a decrease in tip growth. The maximum length of the single cables of F-actin filaments from the apical to the shank region of elongating pollen tubes were also measured to test the polarity within the pollen tube. The maximum length of the F-actin cables were shorter in the rmd-mutant pollen tubes compared to those in the wild type tubes. Therefore, these combined results support that the proper organization of actin cables as well as normal F-actin densities within the tip of the tube can only be achieved if RMD is present.

== See also ==
- Evolutionary history of plants
- Flowering plant
- Self-incompatibility in plants
- Siphonogamy
