= List of physiologists =

This is a list of physiologists who have Wikipedia articles, in alphabetical order by surname.

== A ==
- Edgar Douglas Adrian (1889–1977) British electrophysiologist and Nobel Prizewinner for work on the function of neurons
- Richard W. Aldrich (PhD 1980), neurophysiologist at the University of Texas
- Edgar Allen (1892–1943), anatomist and physiologist at Yale who discovered estrogen
- Adelbert Ames, Jr. (1880–1955), American scientist at Dartmouth College who pioneered the study of physiological optics
- Clay Armstrong (b. 1934), physiologist at the University of Pennsylvania known for work on ion channels
- Eugene Aserinsky (1921–1998], pioneer of sleep research at Jefferson Medical College and Marshall University
- Edwin B. Astwood (1909–1976), Bermudian endocrinologist whose led to treatments for hyperthyroidism
- John Auer (1875–1948), American physiologist and pharmacologist at the St. Louis University School of Medicine who discovered Auer rods
- Julius Axelrod (1912–2004), American biochemist at the National Institutes of Health awarded the Nobel Prize for work on the release and reuptake of catecholamine neurotransmitters

== B ==
- Anna Baetjer (1899–1984), American physiologist and toxicologist at Johns Hopkins University who studied the health effects of industrial work on women
- Frederick Banting (1891–1941) Canadian pharmacologist at the University of Toronto, co-discoverer of insulin and Nobel Prizewinner
- Diane Barber (b. 1952), American cell biologist at the University of California, San Francisco known for work on cell signaling
- Philip Bard (1898–1977), American nervous system physiologist
- Hans Baruch (1925–2013), American physiologist and inventor of German origin, known for instruments for automated clinical chemistry
- William Beaumont (1785–1853), U.S. Army surgeon, the "Father of Gastric Physiology"
- Harry Beevers (1924–2004) American plant physiologist at the University of California, Santa Cruz who discovered the glyoxylate cycle in seedlings of plants
- Charles Bell (1774–1842), Scottish anatomist and physiologist who discovered the difference between sensory nerves and motor nerves in the spinal cord
- Albert F. Bennett (PhD 1971) American zoologist, physiologist, evolutionary biologist at the University of California, Irvine known for known for contributions to evolutionary and comparative physiology
- Claude Bernard (1813–1878) French physiologist at the Sorbonne who developed the concept of the milieu intérieur (internal environment)
- Charles Best (1899–1978), American-Canadian medical scientist at the University of Toronto, one of the discoverers of insulin
- George Billman (b. 1954), American physiologist at the Ohio State University with research focusing on cardiovascular function
- Alfred Binet (1857–1911) French psychologist known primarily for studies of intelligence, but who also participated in the creation of "general physiology"
- Ethel Ronzoni Bishop (1890–1975) American biochemist and physiologist at Washington University in St. Louis who studied carbohydrate metabolism
- Harold F. Blum (1899–1980) American physiologist at the University at Albany, SUNY who investigated sunlight-induced skin cancer.
- Christian Bohr (1855–1911) Danish physician at the University of Copenhagen known for describing the Bohr effect, whereby hydrogen ions and carbon dioxide heterotopically decrease hemoglobin's oxygen-binding affinity
- Walter Boron (b. 1949) American physiologist at Case Western Reserve University who developed a model of cell-pH regulation
- Henry Pickering Bowditch (1840–1911) American soldier, physician, physiologist, and dean of the Harvard Medical School
- Chandler McCuskey Brooks (1905–1989) American physiologist known for research on the central nervous and endocrine systems
- Frank A. Brown Jr. (1908–1983), American physiologist at Northwestern University known for research on biological rhythms
- Macfarlane Burnet (1899–1985), Australian virologist at the National Institute for Medical Research, London, who won a Nobel Prize in 1960 for predicting acquired immune tolerance

== C ==
- Walter Bradford Cannon (1871–1945) American physiologist at Harvard Medical School who coined the term "fight or flight response" and developed the theory of homeostasis
- Anton Julius Carlson (1875–1956) Swedish American physiologist at the University of Chicago who studied the muscular action of the heart
- Alexis Carrel (1873–1944) French surgeon and biologist at the Rockefeller Institute for Medical Research who was awarded the Nobel Prize for pioneering vascular suturing techniques
- William Bosworth Castle (1897–1990) American physician and physiologist who transformed hematology into a serious science
- Gerty Cori (1896–1957) Bohemian-Austrian and American biochemist at Washington University in St. Louis, awarded the Nobel Prize for studies of glycogen metabolism
- André Frédéric Cournand (1895–1988) French-American physician and physiologist at Columbia University, awarded the Nobel Prize for the development of cardiac catheterization
- Patricia S. Cowings (b. 1948) aerospace psychophysiologist at NASA Ames Research Center

== D ==
- John Call Dalton (1825–1889) American physiologist and vivisection activist at Long Island College Hospital
- Hallowell Davis (1896–1992) American physiologist and otolaryngologist at the Central Institute for the Deaf in St. Louis who studied the physiology of hearing and the inner ear
- George Delahunty (b. 1952) American physiologist and endocrinologist at Goucher College who worked on metabolism and endocrine control in vertebrates
- David Bruce Dill (1891–1986) American physiologist at Harvard specializing in exercise science and environmental physiology.

== E ==
- John Carew Eccles (1903–1997) Australian neurophysiologist and philosopher at the University of Chicago awarded Nobel Prize for his work on the synapse
- Joseph Erlanger (1874–1965) American neuroscientist at Washington University in St. Louis awarded the Nobel Prize for establishing the relationship between action potential and fiber diameter

== F ==
- Wallace O. Fenn (1893–1971) American muscle physiologist at the University of Rochester
- Michael Foster (1836–1907) British physiologist at Cambridge University whose Textbook of Physiology was a standard work
- Donald S. Fredrickson (1924–2002) American medical researcher, concerned principally with lipid and cholesterol metabolism, and was director of the National Institutes of Health

== G ==
- Luigi Galvani (1737–1798) Italian physician, physicist, biologist and philosopher who studied animal electricity
- William Francis Ganong, Jr. (1924–2007) American physiologist at the University of California, San Francisco, one of the first scientists to trace how the brain controls functions of the body.
- Theodore Garland, Jr. (b. 1956) American biologist at the University of California, Riverside known for evolutionary physiology
- Herbert Spencer Gasser (1888–1963) American physiologist at Washington University in St. Louis, recipient of the Nobel Prize for work with action potentials in nerve fibers
- Quentin Gibson (1918–2011) British and American physiologist, at the University of Sheffield and Cornell University known for work on hemoglobin
- David R. Goddard (1908–1985) American plant physiologist at the University of Pennsylvania known for the large-scale production of penicillin, bacitracin and riboflavin
- Carl W. Gottschalk (1922–1997) American physiologist at the University of North Carolina at Chapel Hill who made discoveries about kidney function
- Charles Claude Guthrie (1880–1963) American physiologist and surgeon at the University of Pittsburgh known for work on vascular surgery
- Arthur Guyton (1919–2003) American physiologist at the University of Mississippi known for his Textbook of Medical Physiology

== H ==
- Ernst Haeckel (1834–1919) German zoologist, naturalist, eugenicist, philosopher, physician and marine biologist at the University of Jena known for his theory of recapitulation
- Mary Hagedorn (b. 1954) US marine biologist specialised in physiology at the Hawaii Institute of Marine Biology concerned with conservation coral species
- Janet E. Hall (M.D. 1981) Canadian-American neuroendocrinologist at the National Institute of Environmental Health Sciences specializing in human reproductive physiology and pathophysiology
- Selig Hecht (1892–1947) American physiologist at Columbia University who studied photochemistry in photoreceptor cells.
- Frances A. Hellebrandt (1901–1992) American expert on exercise physiology at the University of Wisconsin
- Yandell Henderson (1873–1944) American physiologist at Yale, authority on the physiology of respiration
- Victor Henri (1872–1940) French-Russian physical chemist and physiologist at the Sorbonne and the University of Liège, known mainly as an early pioneer in enzyme kinetics, but who worked on physiological and psychological problems at the beginning of his career
- Archibald Hill (1886–1977), British physiologist at UCL, awarded for elucidation of the production of heat and mechanical work in muscles
- Peter Hochachka (1937–2002) Canadian professor and zoologist at the University of British Columbia known for his work on biochemical adaptation
- Alan Hodgkin (1914–1998) British physiologist and biophysicist at the University of Cambridge awarded the Nobel Prize in Physiology or Medicine in 1963 for discovering the basis for propagation of nerve impulses.
- Alan Hofmann (1931–2021) American gastrointestinal physiologist, biochemist at the University of California, San Diego knwn for research on bile acids and lipid digestion
- Lancelot Hogben (1895–1975) British experimental zoologist and medical statistician at the University of Cape Town who developed Xenopus laevis as a model organism for biological research
- Charles Brenton Huggins (1901–1997) Canadian-American ohysiologist at the University of Chicago known for work on prostate function, prostate cancer, and breast cancer.
- Andrew Huxley (191–2012) British physiologist and biophysicist at the University of Cambridge awarded the Nobel Prize in Physiology or Medicine in 1963 for discovering the basis for propagation of nerve impulses
- Hugh Huxley (1924–2013) British molecular biologist at Brandeis University studied the physiology of muscle
- Ida Henrietta Hyde (1857–1945) American physiologist at the University of Kansas known for developing a micro-electrode

== J ==
- Julian Jack (b. 1936) New Zealand physiologist at the University of Oxford known for studying communication between nerve cells in the nervous system
- Edmund Jacobson (1888–1983) American physician in internal medicine and psychiatry at the Laboratory for Clinical Physiology in Chicago, and a physiologist, the creator of Progressive Muscle Relaxation
- E. Morton Jellinek (1890–1963) American biostatistician, physiologist, and an alcoholism researcher at Yale
- David Julius (b. 1955) American physiologist and Nobel Prize laureate at the University of California, San Francisco known for his work on molecular mechanisms of pain sensation and heat

== K ==
- Bernard Katz (1911–2003) German-born British physician and biophysicist at University College London, awarded the Nobel Prize for work on nerve physiology
- Helen Dean King (1869–1955) American zoologist at the Wistar Institute involved in breeding the Wistar laboratory rat
- Tom Kirkwood (b. 1951) British biologist at Newcastle University known for the disposable soma theory of aging
- Nathaniel Kleitman (1895–1999) American physiologist at the University of Chicago considered to be the father of modern sleep research
- Hans Krebs (1900–1981) German-British biochemist at Sheffield and Oxford Universities awarded the Nobel Prize for studies of cellular respiration
- August Krogh (1874–1949) Danish zoologist at the University of Copenhagen awarded the Nobel Prize for fundamental discoveries within several fields of physiology, known in particular for Krogh's principle
- Marie Krogh (1874–1943) Danish physician at the University of Copenhagen, physiologist and nutritionist
- Stephen Kuffler (1913–1980) was a Hungarian-American neurophysiologist at Harvard, sometimes regarded as the “Father of Modern Neuroscience”

== L ==
- Reuben Lasker (1929–1988) American fisheries scientist at Scripps Institution of Oceanography known for contributions to larval ecology, particularly the Stable Ocean Hypothesis.
- Eliane Le Breton (1897–1977), French physiologist at the University of Strasbourg known for studies of cellular nutrition and the development of cancer cells
- Richard L. Lieber (b. 1956) American physiologist at Northwestern University known for skeletal muscle structure and function
- Jacques Loeb (1859–1924) was a German-born American physiologist at Rockefeller Institute for Medical Research known for many contributions to physiology, including studies of embryogenesis in marine invertebrates

== M ==
- John James Rickard Macleod (1876–1935), British biochemist and physiologist at the University of Toronto awarded the Nobel Prize for his role in the discovery and isolation of insulin
- Paul D. MacLean (1913–2007), American neuroscientist at Yale and National Institute of Mental Health known for work in brain research
- François Magendie (1783–1855), French physiologist at the Collège de France, one of the pioneers of experimental physiology
- August Franz Josef Karl Mayer (1787–1865), German anatomist and physiologist at the University of Bonn known for the Mayer–Rokitansky–Küster–Hauser syndrome
- Jesse Francis McClendon (1880–1976) American chemist, zoologist, and physiologist at the University of Pennsylvania, known for the first pH measurement of human stomach in situ
- Donal T. Manahan (b. 1953) Irish-born American marine scientist and comparative physiologist at the University of Southern California known for Antarctic and deep oceanic research
- Peter Medawar (1915–1987) British biologist and writer at the National Institute for Medical Research, London, awarded the Nobel Prize for discovering acquired immunological tolerance. He is regarded as the “father of transplantation”
- Glenn Allan Millikan (1906–1947), American physiologist, inventor and mountaineer at Vanderbilt University, who invented the first practical, portable oximeter
- Johannes Peter Müller (1801–1858) German physiologist, comparative anatomist, ichthyologist, and herpetologist at the Humboldt University of Berlin, known for the Müllerian duct named after him

== N ==
- David Nalin (b. 1941), American physiologist at the International Centre for Diarrhoeal Disease Research, Bangladesh, who developed oral rehydration therapy for treatment of cholera
- Tim Noakes (b. 1949), South African scientist in the Division of Exercise Science and Sports Medicine at the University of Cape Town
- Tsang-gi Ni (1891–1965), Chinese physiologist

== P ==
- Irvine Page (1901–1991), American physiologist at the Cleveland Clinic known for work on hypertension
- Nicolae Paulescu (1869–1931), Romanian physiologist at Carol Davila University of Medicine and Pharmacy, known for work on diabetes, including discovery of a pancreatic extract containing insulin.
- William Thierry Preyer (1841–1897) was an English-born German biochemist, physiologist and psychologist at Jena and Berlin, known as a pioneer in child psychology
- Eduard Friedrich Wilhelm Pflüger (1829–1910) German physiologist at the University of Bonn, originator of Pflüger's law
- William Prout (1785–1850) British chemist, physician, and natural theologian, who discovered that stomach acidity is due to hydrochloric acid, and classified food substances into what are now called carbohydrates, fats, and proteins.

== R ==
- Hermann Rahn (1912–1990), American physiologist at the University of Rochester who developed the field environmental physiology and is known for his book A Graphical Analysis of the Respiratory Gas Exchange
- Marcus Raichle (b. 1937), American neurologist at the Washington University in St. Louis known for work on the nature of functional brain imaging signals
- James B. Ranck, Jr. (b. 1930), American physiologist at the SUNY Downstate Health Sciences University, known for recording from single neurons in living animals for behavioral studies, and for discovering head-direction cells
- Roberto Refinetti (b. 1957), Brazilian behavioral physiologist at the University of New Orleans known for his book Circadian Physiology
- Ernest W. Retzlaff
- Justin Rhodes (PhD 2002), American neuroscientist at the University of Illinois Urbana-Champaign known for research on exercise-induced hippocampal neurogenesis
- Michael A. Rice (b. 1955), American expert on fisheries and aquaculture at the University of Rhode Island known for showing that bivalve mollusks absorb amino acids directly from sea water
- Alfred Newton Richards (1876–1966), American pharmacologist at the University of Pennsylvania known for the renal micropuncture to study the kidney function
- Edith A. Roberts (1881–1977) American plant physiologist at Vassar College who created the first ecological laboratory in the United States
- Thorburn Brailsford Robertson (1884–1930), Australian physiologist and biochemist, known for his studies of senescence and for promotion of the use of insulin for diabetes in Australia.
- Karl Asmund Rudolphi (1771–1832) Swedish-born German naturalist at the Humboldt University of Berlin regarded as the "father of helminthology".

== S ==
- Matthias Jakob Schleiden (1804–1881), German botanist at the University of Tartu and co-founder of cell theory
- Bodil Schmidt-Nielsen (1918–2015), Danish-born American physiologist at MDI Biological Laboratory in Maine, who researched on the mechanisms of urea transport
- Knut Schmidt-Nielsen (1915–2007), Danish-born American comparative physiologist at Duke University known for contributions to ecophysiology
- Theodor Schwann (1810–1882), German physician and physiologist at the University of Liège who extended cell theory to animals.
- Édouard Séguin (1812–1880), French physician and educationist born in Clamecy, Nièvre, known primarily for work with children with cognitive impairments, but also concerned with physiological aspects of temperature.
- Homer Smith (1895–1962), American physiologist at New York University Grossman School of Medicine known for work on kidney function
- John Speakman (b. 1958), British biologist at the University of Aberdeen interested in energy expenditure and balance in animals
- Arthur H Steinhaus (1897–1970), American physical fitness expert and sports physiologist at George Williams College
- Grover C. Stephens (1925–2003), American marine biologist and comparative physiologist at the University of Minnesota and the University of California, Irvine known for studies of uptake of amino acids by marine invertebrates
- Hubertus Strughold (1898–1986), German-born American physiologist and medical researcher at Dachau concentration camp and the US Air Force Systems Command, known for experimentation on humans
- Paul K. Stumpf (1919–2007), American biochemist at the University of California, Davis, known for research on the biochemistry of lipids in plants, and for his textbook Outlines of Enzyme Chemistry
- Annemarie Surlykke (1955 – 2015) was a Danish physiologist, significantly in bioacoustic research
- Earl Wilbur Sutherland, Jr. (1915–1974), American pharmacologist and biochemist at the University of Miami, awarded the Nobel Prize for his discoveries on the mechanisms of the action of hormones, especially adrenaline (epinephrine)

== T ==
- Anitra Thorhaug (PhD 1969), American marine biologist, plant ecophysiologist and chemical oceanographer at the Yale School of the Environment known for work on the rehabilitation of coastal ecosystems
- Caroline tum Suden (1900–1976), American neurophysiologist and neuropharmacologist at Boston University known for investigating effects of various substances on the nervous system
- Luca Turin (b. 1953) Italian-Argentinian biophysicist at the University of Buckingham known for studies of olfaction
- Abby Howe Turner (1875–1957) American physiologist at Mount Holyoke College who specialized in colloid osmotic pressure and circulatory reactions to gravity
- J. Scott Turner (b. 1951) American physiologist at the State University of New York College of Environmental Science and Forestry who has contributed to the theory of collective intelligence

== V ==
- Max Verworn (1863–1921), German physiologist at the University of Bonn known for research on experimental physiology, especially for his work on cellular physiology
- Rudolf Virchow (1821–1902), German biologist at the Charité and the University of Würzburg, famous for the dictum Omnis cellula e cellula (All cells come from cells)
- Alessandro Volta (1745–1827), Italian chemist and physicist at the University of Pavia whose work in physiology concerned his interpretation of Galvani's experiments with frog's legs.

== W ==
- John Walsh (1726–1795) was a British officer in the government of Bengal who in his retirement studied electric fish
- Torkel Weis-Fogh (1922–1975), Danish zoologist at the University of Cambridge and the University of Copenhagen known for wok on insect flight
- J. Walter Woodbury (1923–2017), American electrophysiologist at the University of Utah, author of the first textbook explanation of the Hodgkin-Huxley model studies of the action potential
