= Anitra =

Anitra is an Arabic-sounding female given name, originally invented in the 1860s by the playwright Henrik Ibsen for a minor character in his play Peer Gynt. It later became popular as a female name in Scandinavian countries. Notable people with the name include:

- Anitra Hamilton
- Anitra Ford
- Anitra Rasmussen
- Anitra Steen
- Anitra Thorhaug

== See also ==
- 1016 Anitra, a main-belt asteroid
- Anitra's Dance
