= David Dill =

David Dill may refer to:

- David Bruce Dill (1891–1986), American physiologist
- David K. Dill (1955–2015), American politician
- David L. Dill (born 1957), American computer scientist
