= Scott Turner =

Scott Turner may refer to:

- Scott Turner (engineer), (1880–1972), American mining engineer
- Scott Turner (songwriter) (1931–2009), Canadian composer, producer, musician and publisher
- J. Scott Turner (born 1951), American physiologist
- Scott Turner (footballer) (born 1970), Australian rules footballer
- Scott Turner (politician) (born 1972), American politician and former football player and sprinter
- Scott Turner (Big Brother) (born 1975), contestant in the UK series Big Brother
- Scott Turner (American football coach) (born 1982), American football coach
- Scott Turner (rugby league) (born 1988), British rugby league footballer
- Scott Turner, fictional protagonist of the 1989 film Turner & Hooch
