= NOAAS Oceanographer =

NOAAS Oceanographer may refer to the following ships of the National Oceanic and Atmospheric Administration (NOAA):

- NOAAS Oceanographer (R 101), an oceanographic research ship in commission in the United States Coast and Geodetic Survey as USC&GS Oceanographer (OSS 01) from 1966 to 1970 and in the NOAA fleet from 1970 to 1996.
- NOAAS Oceanographer (2024), an oceanographic research ship scheduled for completion in late 2024.
