= NOAAS Discoverer =

NOAAS Discoverer may refer to the following ships of the National Oceanic and Atmospheric Administration (NOAA):

- NOAAS Discoverer (R 102), an oceanographic research ship in commission in the United States Coast and Geodetic Survey as USC&GS Oceanographer (OSS 01) from 1967 to 1970 and in the NOAA fleet from 1970 to 1996.
- NOAAS Discoverer (2025), an oceanographic research ship scheduled for completion in 2026.
