= Women's Centennial Congress =

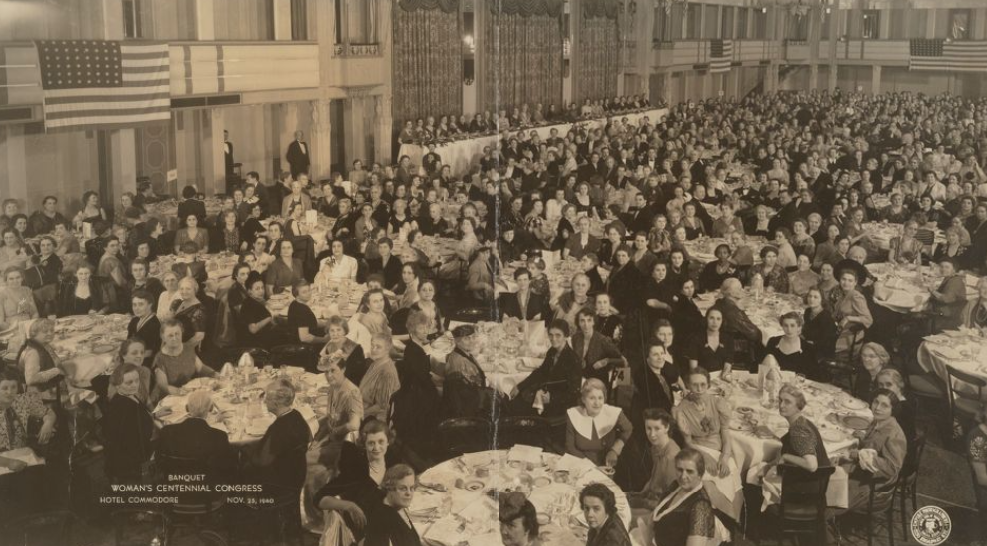
Women's Centennial Conference in 1940

The Women's Centennial Congress was organized by Carrie Chapman Catt and held at the Astor Hotel on November 25-27, 1940, to celebrate a century of female progress.

== History ==
The date chosen was 100 years after the first World Anti-Slavery Convention in London in 1840. That convention had been a gathering of abolitionists from around the world. The organisers were surprised when women were sent as delegates and the initial reaction was to deny them entry. Women including the female delegates were only allowed in under sufferance and they were forbidden from speaking or voting. This event was, in time, the catalyst for later efforts in the suffrage movement, especially the Seneca Falls Convention. At the Women's Centennial Congress, 100 successful women, most notably Eleanor Roosevelt, were selected to represent female progress in numerous fields, although Catt had failed to get Roosevelt to attend the conference. The 100 women chosen were all American, alive and doing jobs that would have been impossible for a woman to undertake in 1840.

A later commentator evaluated the conference as a media event.

== 100 Women included (not complete) ==
=== Politics ===
- Eleanor Roosevelt
- Frances Perkins
- Ruth Bryan Rohde US Ambassador
- Florence Harriman US Ambassador
- Mary Anderson
- Katherine Lenroot
- Nellie Tayloe Ross
- Louise Stanley (Home economics)
- Harriet Elliott
- Sarah Wambaugh
- Henrietta Additon
- Genevieve Earle
- Frieda S. Miller
- Mary Driscoll

=== Education ===
- Mary E. Wooley
- Aurelia Henry Reinhardt
- Virginia Gildersleeve
- Winifred Edgerton Merrill
- Mary W. Newson
- Olive Hazlett
- Anna Pell Wheeler
- Louise Pound
- Viola Florence Barnes
- Alice H. Lerch

=== Science ===
- Margaret Mead
- Frederica de Laguna
- Christina Lochman
- Marie Poland Fish
- Anne M. McGrath
- Florence R. Sabin
- Maud Slye
- Alice Catherine Evans
- Frances A. Hellebrandt
- Gladys A. Anslow
- Catherine Blodgett
- Constance L. Torrey
- Emma P. Carr
- Helen U. Keily
- Wanda Kirkbride Farr
- Margaret Clay Ferguson
- Ida Barney
- Annie Jump Cannon

=== Medicine (not complete) ===
- Alice Hamilton
- Josephine Bicknell
- Gladys Dick
- Katherine MacFarlane
- Martha Tracy
- Bertha Van Hoosen
- Sara Josephine Baker
- Justina Hill
- Ruth Morris Bakwin

=== Theology and Social Service (not complete) ===
- Georgia Harkness

=== Lawyers ===
- Catherine Waugh McCullough
- Florence E. Allen
- Sara M. Soffel

=== Home Economics ===
- Flora Rose
- Helen T. Parsons
- Mary I. Barber
- Millie Kalsem

=== Business ===
- Beatrice Fox Auerbach
- Dorothy Shaver
- Dorothy Anderson
- Teresa G. O'Brien
- Clara Scovil

=== Miscellaneous ===
- Rachel Crothers
- Margaret Webster
- Antonia Brico
- Juliana Force
- Beatrice Winsor
- Grace McGann Morley
- Belle J. Benchley
- Captain Rhoda J Milliken
- Sergeant Mary C Gainey
- Eleanor Hutzel
