= Diane Barber =

American cell physiologist and biologist

Diane L. Barber
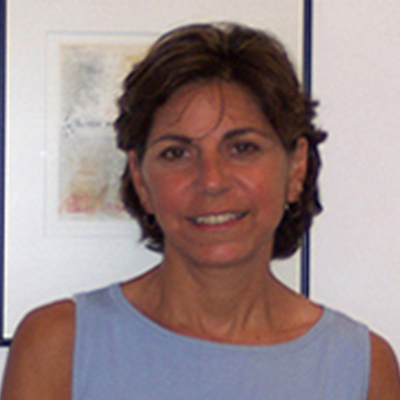
- Born: 1952 (age 73–74); Bakersfield, California, U.S.
- Education: B.S., M.S., University of California, Davis; Ph.D., University of California, Los Angeles
- Spouse: A. Richard Ellis (1984-present)
- Scientific career
- Fields: Cell Biology
- Workplaces: University of California, San Francisco
- Website: dbarberlab.ucsf.edu

Diane L. Barber (born 1952), an American cell biologist, is a Professor and former Chair in the Department of Cell and Tissue Biology at University of California, San Francisco (UCSF). She is an elected Fellow of the American Association for the Advancement of Science and the American Society for Cell Biology (ASCB). In addition to teaching graduate and professional students and her administrative service, she directed a research laboratory funded by grants from the National Institutes of Health (NIH) and the National Science Foundation (NSF).

== Early life and education ==
Barber was born and raised in Bakersfield, California. Her father, Leo Barber (Berberian), and mother, Helen Barber (nee Garabedian), were first-generation Armenian Americans whose families emigrated from the Anatolia region of Eastern Turkey; Karput and Diyarbakir, respectively. For the past several years, Barber has traveled to Yerevan, Armenia to co-teach a week-long cell biology course at the Institute of Molecular Biology. She received her BS in Biological Sciences and MS in Physiology from the University of California, Davis, and her PhD in Anatomy under Andrew Soll and John Walsh at the University of California, Los Angeles. Her postdoctoral work, supported by an NIH fellowship, was with Susan Leeman at the University of Massachusetts Medical Center in Worcester, MA. Her first faculty appointment was as an assistant professor at Yale University in the Department of Surgery, Section of Anatomy between 1987-1991. Longing to return to her native California, she joined the faculty at the University of California, San Francisco in 1992, where she was promoted to Associate and then Full Professor.

== Research ==
A major aspect of Barber's research determined in molecular detail how intracellular pH (pHi) dynamics regulate cell behaviors, with a focus on epithelial plasticity, including transformed cancer cells and differentiation of stem cells. Her research pioneered bridging protein structure and electrostatics with cell biology to reveal how pHi dynamics regulate cell behaviors though protonation of titrating amino acids as a post-translational modification to affect protein structure and function. Her group made seminal contributions on resolving the design principles and functions of "pH sensors" described as endogenous proteins regulated within the cellular pH range, which they showed have critical roles in cell division, migration, differentiation, and tumorigenesis. Through their work, Barber's research group developed new genetically-encoded biosensors to quantitatively measure cytoplasmic and lysosome pH dynamics in clonal cells and animals.

=== Cancer cell biology ===
One focus of her research is on cancer cell biology, specifically in regards to the pHi (intracellular pH) of cancer cells., which is increased in comparison to normal cells. The research focuses on the relationship between the increased pHi and their ability to perform necessary functions. The laboratory group showed in molecular detail how it is necessary for the directed cell migration for metastasis. This was accomplished through the use of selective pH sensors that defined how proteins were regulated by cellular changes in pH. The group subsequently worked on the effect of increased pHi on the glycolytic enzymes necessary for metabolic programming, somatic mutation biology, and tumorigenic behaviors. The research uses optogenetic tools to control the pHi of the cells, biosensors that are genetically encoded to quantify the pHi of single cancer cells as well as cells in vivo, and computational programming to identify ionizable residues in proteins and amino acid mutation signatures that are present in numerous cancer databases.

=== Stem cell differentiation ===
The second focus of Barber's laboratory is in stem cell differentiation, in collaboration with the laboratory of Todd Nystul. The group studies how intracellular pH and actin filament dynamics regulate stem cell differentiation. Through their work, the group has been able to show that daughter cells have a higher pHi than naive adult and embryonic stem cells that is necessary for their differentiation. There have been additional studies of pHi(intracellular pH), and its affect on normal cell behaviors, and Yi Liu and Diane Barber gifted two packaging plasmids for the purpose of cell science. Additionally, the laboratory studies how actin filament remodeling is necessary for the differentiation of naive embryonic stem cells. The current focus is on the transcriptional events linked to these actin dynamics.

=== Neurodegeneration ===
The final main focus of her research is on neurodegeneration, as part of a 4-lab collaboration with the groups of Aimee Kao, Matt Jacobson, and Torsten Wittman. The main focus of this area is to identify the dysregulated cellular pH dynamics that results in the pathology associated Alzheimer's disease. The laboratory is focused on reversing the decreased intracellular pH and increased lysosomal pH that is commonly associated with neurodegeneration. This team recently received one of five Allen Distinguished Investigator (ADI) grants of $1.32 million.

== Leadership and mentoring ==
Barber has multiple leadership and mentoring recognitions. She was a long-standing member of the Women in Cell Biology (WICB)^{[6]} committee within the American Society for Cell Biology (ASCB) and served as chair of the committee. She was also co-chair and chair of Gordon Research Conferences on Molecular Pharmacology, and served on the Scientific Advisory Board of the Max Planck Institute for Experimental Medicine^{[7]} as well as on editorial boards for several journals, including Molecular Biology of the Cell, the American Journal of Physiology – Cell Physiology, and Current Opinion in Cell Biology. She supervised more than 35 PhD students and postdoctoral fellows, and her mentoring and research excellence has been recognized by her receipt of the Annual Faculty Mentoring Award in 2013 from the UCSF Postdoctoral Scholars Association, of the Annual Faculty Research and Mentoring Award in 2020 from the UCSF John Greene Society, and the Annual Faculty Lecture in Translational Science from the UCSF Academic Senate.

== Personal life ==
Barber lives in Mill Valley, CA with her husband Richard Ellis, who is a criminal defense attorney specializing in capital habeas appeals. They have two daughters, Claire Ellis Olson, an industry bioinformatics analyst in Seattle, WA, and Lauren Ellis, an attorney in the Los Angeles County Public Defender's Office, as well as two grandchildren. With her husband, she has been a coach for Special Olympics Swimming in Marin County for 20 years. She is also an active member and serves on the Executive Committee for the Armenian Society of Fellows, working to improve higher education and research in Armenia.

== Selected publications ==
=== Notable Research Articles ===
A complete list of Barber research publications is available here.

- Denker, SP. Huang, DC, Orlowski, J, Furthmayr, H and Barber, DL. 2000 Direct binding the Na-H exchanger NHE1 to ERM proteins regulates the cortical cytoskeleton and cell shape independently of H^{+} translocation. Mol Cell 6:1425-1436. PMID 11163215
- Denker, SP and Barber, DL. 2002 Cell migration requires both ion translocation and cytoskeletal anchoring by the Na-H exchanger NHE1. J Cell Biol. 159:1087-1096. (Highlighted in Journal [Using acid to find direction. J Cell Biol. 2002 159:911]) PMID 12486114
- Frantz, C, Barreiro, G, Dominguez, L, Chen, X, Eddy, R, Condeelis, J, Kelly, M, Jacobson, MP and Barber, DL. 2008 Cofilin is a pH sensor for actin free barbed end formation. J Cell Biol. 183:865-879 (Highlighted in Journal) PMID 19029335
- Srivastava, J, Barreiro, G, Groscurth, S, Gringas, AR, Goult, BT Critchley, DR, Kelly, MJS, Jacobson. MP and Barber, DL. 2008 Structural model and functional significance of pH-dependent talin-actin binding for focal adhesion remodeling. Proc Natl Acad Sci. 105:14436-14441. PMID 18780792
- LeClaire, LL III, Baumgartner, M, Iwasa, JH, Mullins, RD and Barber, DL. 2008 Phosphorylation of the Arp2/3 complex is necessary to nucleate actin filaments. J Cell Biol. 182:647-654. (Highlighted commentary in Journal 182:617) PMID 22125478
- Webb, BE, Chimenti, M, Jacobson, MP, Barber, D.L. 2011 Dysregulated pH: a perfect storm for cancer progression. Nature Cancer Rev. 11:671-677.
- Choi, CC, Webb, BA, Chimenti, MS, Jacobson, MP and Barber, DL. 2013 pH sensing by FAK-His58 regulates focal adhesion remodeling. J Cell Biol. 202:849-59. (Commentaries: C. Lawson and D. D. Schlaepfer, "pHocal adhesion kinase regulation is on a FERM foundation", J Cell Biol. 202:833-836 and K. Legg, "Factoring pH into FAK phosphorylation", Cell Migration Gateway). PMID 24043700
- Schönichen, A., Webb, B.E., Jacobson, M.P., and Barber, D.L. 2013 Considering protonation as a post-translational modification regulating protein structure and function. Ann Rev Biophys. 2013 42:289-314. PMID 23451893
- LeClaire, LL, Rana, MK, Baumgartner, M and Barber, DL. 2015 The Nck-interacting kinase NIK increases Arp2/3 complex activity by phosphorylating the Arp2 subunit. J Cell Biol. 208:161-170. (Highlighted commentary in Journal 208:138) PMID 25601402
- Webb BA, Forouhar F, Szu FE, Seetharaman J, Tong L, Barber DL. 2015 Structures of human phosphofructokinase-1 and atomic basis of cancer-associated mutations. Nature 523:111-114. PMID 25985179
- Ulmschneider, B., Grillo-Hill, B.K., Benitez, M., Azimova, D., Barber. D.L., Nystul, T.G. 2016 Increased intracellular pH is necessary for adult epithelial and embryonic stem cell differentiation. J. Cell Biol. 215:345-355 (featured focus article in journal) PMID 27821494
- Webb BA, Dosey AM, Wittmann T, Kollman J, Barber DL 2017 Filament assembly by the glycolytic enzyme phosphofructokinase-1. J Cell Biol 216:2305-2313. (Spotlight article in Journal “Strength in numbers: Phosphofructokinase polymerization prevails in the liver” J Cell Biol. 216:2239-2241). (Republished in a special J Cell Biol. edition on noteworthy work on cell biophysics) PMID 28646105
- White KA, Grillo-Hill BK, Barber DL. 2017 Cancer cell behaviors mediated by dysregulated pH dynamics at a glance. J Cell Sci. 130(4):663-669. PMID 28202602
- White, KA, Garrido Ruiz, G, Szpiech, ZA, Strauli, NB, Hernandez, RD, Jacobson, JP and Barber, DL. 2017 Cancer-associated arginine to histidine mutations confer a gain in pH sensing to mutant proteins. Sci. Signaling 10(495). pii: eaam9931. PMID 28874603
- White, KA, Grillo-Hill, BK, Esquivel, M, Peralta, J, Bui, VN, Chire, I, Barber, DL. 2018. β-catenin is a pH sensor with decreased stability at higher intracellular pH. J Cell Biol. 217:3965-3976. Also included in JCB Special Collection of published outstanding articles on the cell biology of adhesion. PMID 30315137
- Webb BA, Aloisio FM, Charafeddine RA, Cook J, Wittmann T, and Barber DL. 2021 pHLARE: a new biosensor reveals decreased lysosome pH in cancer cells. Mol Biol Cell. 32:131-142. PMID 33237838
- Aloisio FM, Barber DL. 2022 Arp2/3 complex activity is necessary for mouse ESC differentiation, times formative pluripotency, and enables lineage specification. Stem Cell Reports. 17(6):1318-1333. PMID 35658973
- Kisor, KP, Ruiz, DG, Jacobson, MP, Barber, DL. 2025 A role for pH dynamics regulating transcription factor DNA-binding selectivity. Nucleic Acids Res. 53(10):gkaf474. PMID: 40464693

== Awards and memberships ==
From 1995 to 2000, Barber was named an Established Investigator by the American Heart Association. From 1998 and continuing into the present day, Barber has been on the editorial board of the American Journal of Physiology. Cell Physiology. From 1998 to 1999, Barber served on the National Review Committee for Transport and Metabolism of the American Heart Association. In 1998, Barber was awarded the Innovation in Basic Sciences Award at the University of California, San Francisco. From 2000 to 2002, Barber was the co-chair of the National Review Committee for Transport and Metabolism for the American Heart Association. In 2001, Barber became the vice-chair of the Gordon Conference on Molecular Pharmacology, and in 2003, she became the chair. Barber was a member of the NIH CDF3 Study Section from 2001 to 2003. In 2005, Barber received the Sandler Program Integrative Award.

In 2012, Barber was selected as a fellow of the American Association for the Advancement of Science (AAAS).

In 2016, Barber was appointed as the chair of Women in Cell Biology (WICB) for the American Society for Cell Biology (ASCB). Her term began on January 1, 2016. She succeeded the last chair, Sandra K. Masur.

== Awards and honors ==
1. National Student Research Award, First Prize; American Gastroenterological Association (AGA) (1982, 1985)
2. Joseph P. Healy Research Award, University of Massachusetts (1986)
3. Established Investigator American Heart Association (AHA) (1995)
4. Innovation in Basic Sciences, UCSF (1998)
5. Gordon Conference on Molecular Pharmacology, Co-Chair (2001) and Chair (2003)
6. Leland A and Gladys K Barber Endowed Chair in Dentistry (2010-2022)
7. Elected Fellow, American Association for the Advancement of Science (2012)
8. Outstanding Faculty Mentoring Award, UCSF Postdoctoral Scholars Association (2012)
9. Faculty Research Lecturer Award, UCSF School of Dentistry (2013)
10. Chair, Women in Cell Biology (WICB) for American Society of Cell Biology (ASCB) (2016-2019)
11. Excellence in Research and Mentoring, John Greene Society (2021)
12. Faculty Lecture in Translational Science, UCSF Academic Senate (2022)
13. Elected to Executive Committee Armenian Society of Fellows (2022)
14. Elected Fellow, American Society for Cell Biology (ASCB) (2024)
