= Landunvez =

Landunvez Landunvez
- Commune
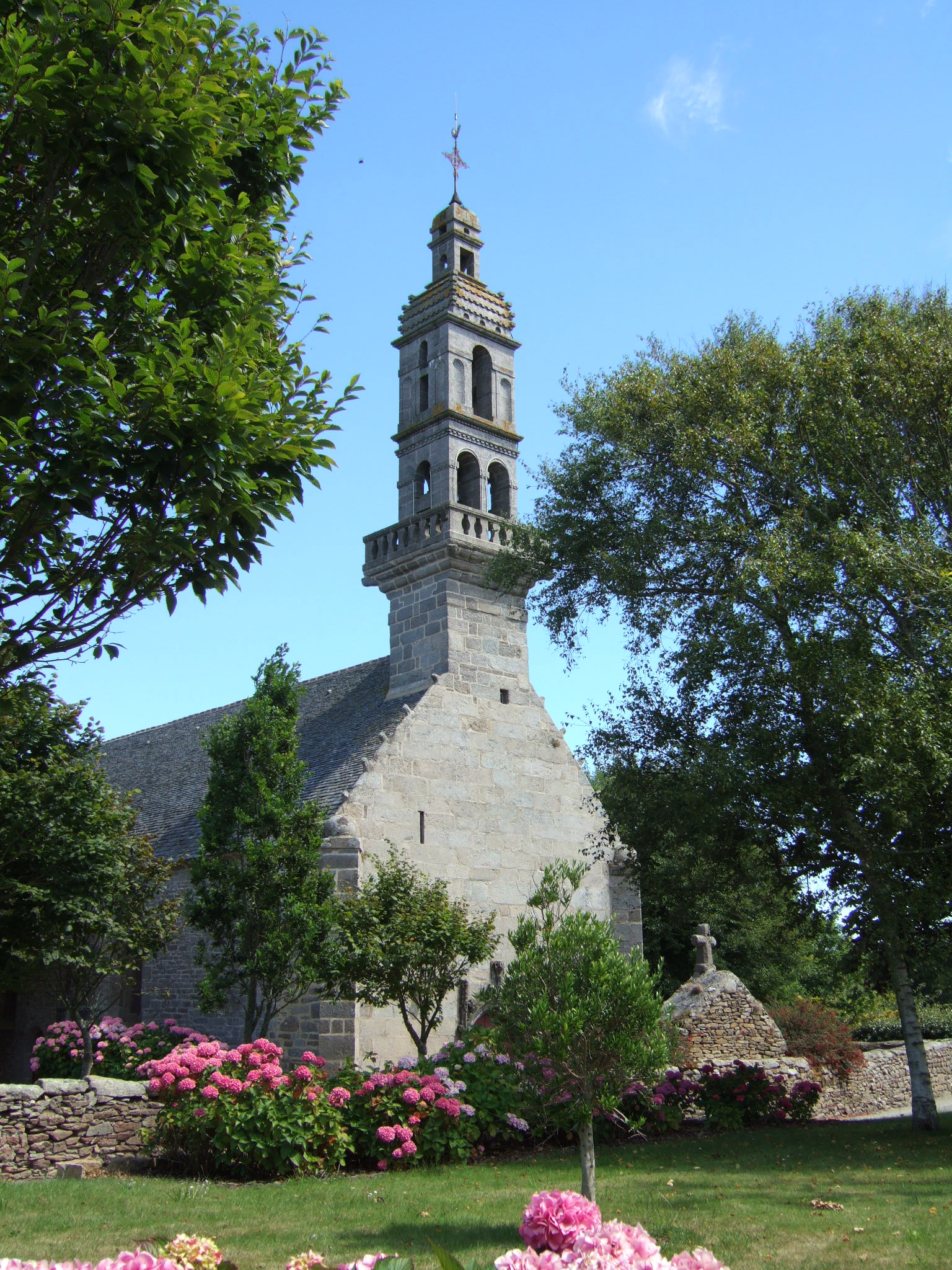
- The church of Our Lady of Kersaint
- Location of Landunvez
- Location within France Location within Brittany
- Coordinates: 48°32′00″N 4°43′32″W
- Country: France
- Region: Brittany
- Department: Finistère
- Arrondissement: Brest
- Canton: Plabennec
- Intercommunality: Pays d'Iroise

Government
  - Mayor (2020–2026): Christophe Colin
- Area^{1}: 13.53 km^{2} (5.22 sq mi)
- Highest elevation: 52 m (171 ft)
- Lowest elevation: 0 m (0 ft)
- Population (2023): 1,579
  - Density: 116.7/km^{2} (302.3/sq mi)
- Time zone: UTC+01:00 (CET)
  - Summer (DST): UTC+02:00 (CEST)
- INSEE/Postal code: 29109 /29840
- ^{1} French Land Register data, which excludes lakes, ponds, glaciers > 1 km^{2} (0.386 sq mi or 247 acres) and river estuaries.

Landunvez (French pronunciation: [lɑ̃dynvɛs]; Breton: Landunvez) is a commune in the Finistère department of Brittany in north-western France. Landunvez is twinned with the town of Bradninch in Devon, UK.

== Population ==
Historical population
Year	Pop.	±% p.a.
1968	1,391	—
1975	1,248	−1.54%
1982	1,315	+0.75%
1990	1,359	+0.41%
1999	1,345	−0.11%
2007	1,332	−0.12%
2012	1,462	+1.88%
2017	1,475	+0.18%
2023	1,579	+1.14%
Source: INSEE

Inhabitants of Landunvez are called in French Landunvéziens.

== Notable people ==
Eliane Le Breton (1897–1977) physiologist, born in Landunvez

== See also ==
- Communes of the Finistère department
