= Maud Slye =

American pathologist

Maud Caroline Slye
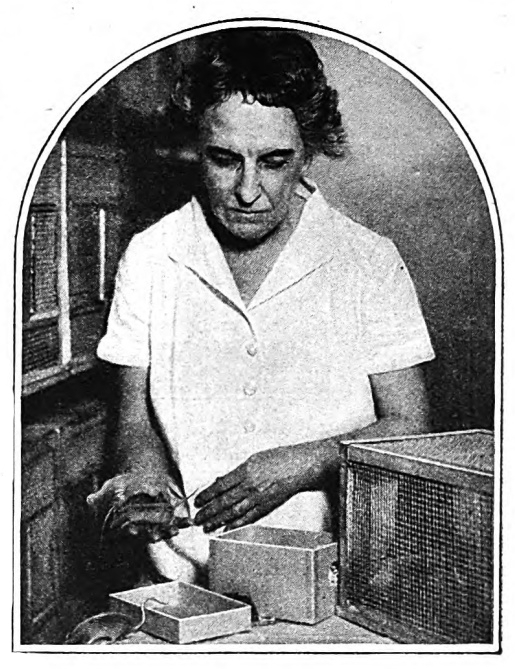
- Maud Slye in 1928
- Born: February 8, 1879; Minneapolis, Minnesota, US
- Died: September 17, 1954 (aged 75); Chicago, Illinois, US
- Resting place: Oak Woods Cemetery
- Education: Brown University; University of Chicago
- Known for: Genetically uniform mice as a research tool
- Awards: Gold Medal, American Medical Association
- Scientific career
- Fields: Pathology, Genetics
- Workplaces: University of Chicago

Maud Caroline Slye (February 8, 1879 – September 17, 1954) was an American pathologist who was born in Minneapolis, Minnesota. A historian of women and science wrote that Slye "'invented' genetically uniform mice as a research tool." Her work focused on the heritability of cancer in mice. She was also an advocate for the comprehensive archiving of human medical records, believing that proper mate selection would help eradicate cancer. During her career, she received multiple awards and honors, including the gold medal of the American Medical Association in 1914, the Ricketts Prize in 1915, and the gold medal of the American Radiological Society in 1922. In 1923, Albert Soiland, a pioneer radiologist, nominated Maud Slye, a cancer pathologist for the Nobel Prize in Physiology or Medicine. The nomination came as a result of her work as one of the first scientists to suggest that cancer can be an inherited disease, and for the development of new procedures for the care and breeding of lab mice.

== Education and career ==
Slye received her undergraduate training at the University of Chicago and Brown University. While at the University of Chicago, she supported herself as a secretary for University President William Rainey Harper. After a breakdown, she completed her studies at Brown in 1899. After teaching, she began her postgraduate work in 1908 at the University of Chicago, performing neurological experiments on mice. She would remain at the University of Chicago for the rest of her career. After hearing of a cluster of cattle cancers at a nearby stockyard, she changed the focus of her research to cancer. Slye raised—and kept pedigrees for—150,000 mice during her career. On 5 May 1913, she first presented a paper before the American Society for Cancer Research regarding the work on general problems in heredity, carried on at the University of Chicago in the Department of Zoology. In 1919 she was selected as director of the Cancer Laboratory at the University of Chicago. In 1922, she was promoted to assistant professor and became an associate professor in 1926. She retired in 1945 as a professor Emeritus of Pathology. Her belief that cancer was a recessive trait that could be eliminated through breeding caused clashes with fellow scientists, including C. C. Little.

Slye was devoted to her work. A 1937 Time account of her behavior at a science convention described her as "high-spirited" and quoted her as saying: "I breed out breast cancers. I don't think we should feel so hopeless about breeding out other types. Only romance stops us. It is the duty of scientists to ascertain and present facts. If the people prefer romance to taking advantage of these facts, there is nothing we can do about it." Reluctant to leave her mice to the care of her assistants, she once went twenty-six years without a vacation. She never married and spent her retirement reviewing data from her research. She died of a heart attack in 1954 and was buried in Oak Woods Cemetery. News of her death was featured on the front page of the Chicago Daily Tribune.

== Woman of achievement ==
The Women's Centennial Congress organized by Carrie Chapman Catt was held in New York City in November 25–27, 1940, to celebrate a century of female progress. To demonstrate their advances, 100 "successful women" were invited to represent their respective fields of study in which they were working in 1940, but that would have been impossible for them in 1840. Slye's participation was listed under "Science" with Margaret Mead and Annie Jump Cannon, among others. The 100 women chosen were "all American, alive and doing jobs that would have been impossible for a woman to undertake in 1840."

== Poet ==
Besides a prolific and dedicated scientist, Slye found time to publish two separate volumes of poetry. Songs and Solaces (1934) and I in the Wind (1936).

- Songs and Solaces, 1934.
- I in the Wind, Symphony no. 1, and minor songs, 1936.
