= Viola Florence Barnes =

American historian

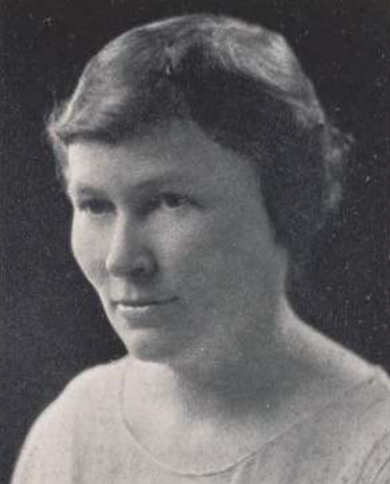
- Born: August 28, 1885; Albion
- Died: July 26, 1979 (aged 93)
- Alma mater: Yale University; University of Nebraska–Lincoln
- Employer: Mount Holyoke College
- Awards: Guggenheim Fellowship (1930)

Viola Florence Barnes (August 28, 1885 – July 1979) was an American historian and writer, one of the most prominent female historians in the US in the first half of 20th century.

== Life ==
Born in Albion, Nebraska, Barnes was educated at the University of Nebraska and Yale University. She taught at Smith College (1933) and Mount Holyoke College (1933–1952). In 1940, she was honored by the Women's Centennial Congress as one of a hundred successful women in fields formerly closed to women.

She focused on the history of New England and the Maritime provinces, her most famous work was The Dominion of New England (1923).

She died in 1979, aged 93. Her papers are held at Mount Holyoke College.

== Sources ==
- John G. Reid, Viola Florence Barnes, 1885-1979: a historian's biography, University of Toronto Press, 2005
- "Viola Florence Barnes." Contemporary Authors Online. Detroit: Gale, 2001. Gale Biography In Context. Accessed February 17, 2024.
