= NOAAS Oceanographer (2024) =

American oceanographic research vessel

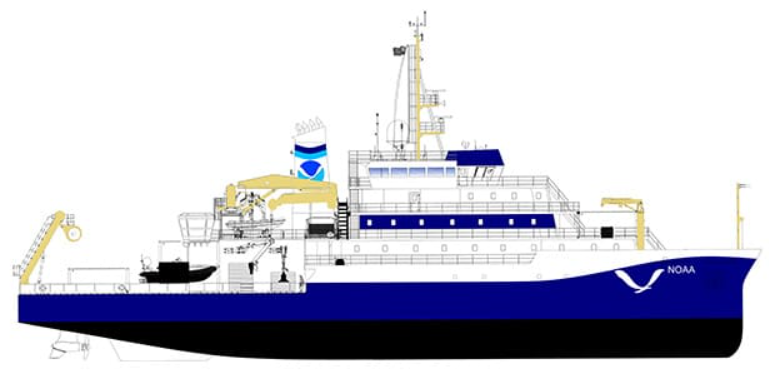
- NOAA illustration of NOAAS Oceanographer

History

United States
- Name: NOAAS Oceanographer
- Namesake: Oceanographer, a scientist who studies the ocean
- Awarded: 31 December 2020
- Builder: Thoma-Sea Marine Constructors, Houma, Louisiana
- Laid down: 15 June 2022
- Launched: August 2024
- Sponsored by: Linda Kwok Schatz
- Completed: Early 2025 (projected)
- Commissioned: Early 2025 (planned)
- Home port: Honolulu, Hawaii (planned)
- Status: Fitting out

General characteristics
- Type: Oceanographic research ship
- Length: 244 ft 6 in (74.5 m)
- Beam: 51 ft 3 in (15.6 m)
- Propulsion: High-efficiency diesel engines
- Crew: 20, plus up to 28 embarked scientists

NOAAS Oceanographer is an American oceanographic research vessel scheduled to enter commissioned service in the National Oceanic and Atmospheric Administration (NOAA) in 2025. She is under construction, with completion anticipated in early 2025. She is the second NOAA ship to bear the name Oceanographer.

== Design ==
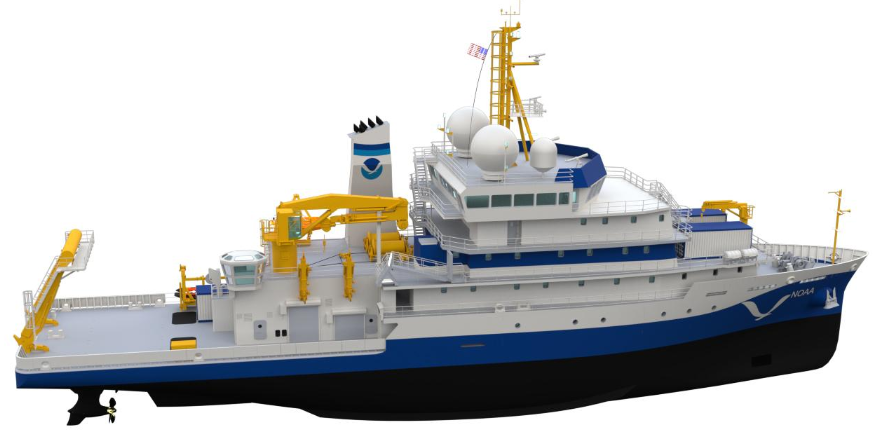
NOAA illustration of NOAAS Oceanographer and NOAAS Discoverer.

Oceanographer and her sister ship NOAAS Discoverer represent an effort by the National Oceanic and Atmospheric Administration (NOAA) to recapitalize its aging fleet. The ships are built to commercial standards, and NOAA describes them as "state-of-the-art" and designed to support a wide variety of scientific missions, with a capability of conducting general oceanographic research and exploration as well as more specific studies of marine life, the oceanic climate, and ocean ecosystems. The ships can perform scientific missions in shallow coastal waters and over the continental shelf, as well as ocean survey and data collection worldwide. The ships are equipped to launch work boats, perform maintenance on buoys and moorings, deploy scientific instruments to collect weather and water-column data, and conduct seafloor mapping surveys.

To help meet NOAA's goal of reducing its carbon footprint, each ship incorporates high-efficiency diesel engines that comply with strict Environmental Protection Agency (EPA) Tier IV final emissions requirements, stack-gas emission controls, and other technologies which NOAA estimates will save 15,000 US gallons (57,000 L; 12,000 imp gal) of diesel fuel per year for each ship and result in an estimated reduction of approximately 5,700 short tons (5,200 t) of carbon dioxide. Each ship has a crew of 20 and accommodation for up to 28 embarked scientists.

== Construction ==
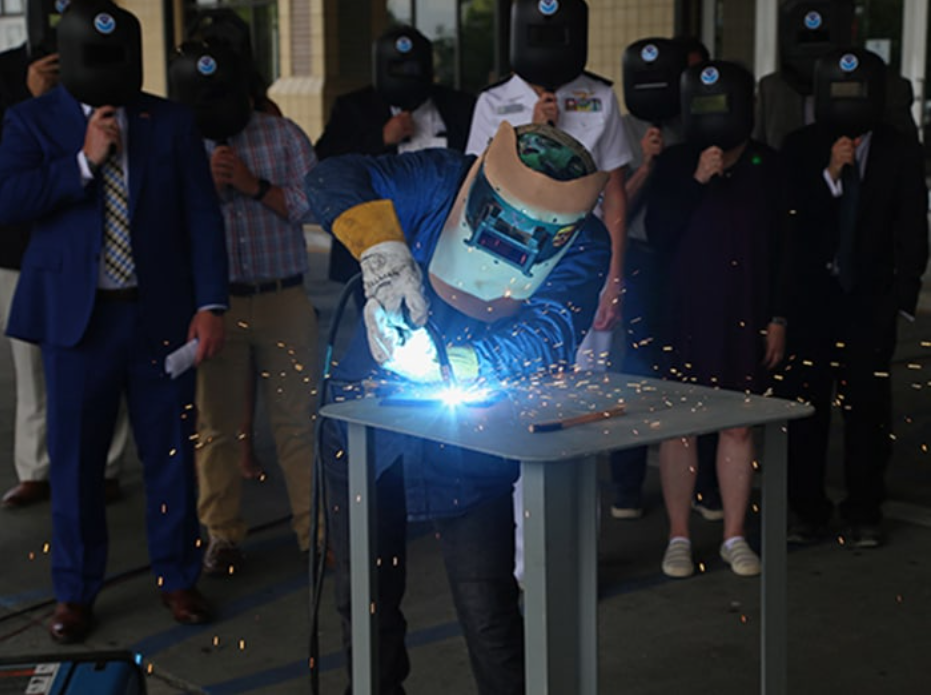
A welder welds the initials of Linda Kwok Schatz, sponsor of NOAAS Oceanographer, onto a steel plate that would be incorporated into the ship during a ceremony on 15 June 2022.

In February 2024, NOAA Corps officers from NOAAS Nancy Foster and NOAAS Reuben Lasker pose in front of Oceanographer during her construction.

NOAA acquired Oceanographer and Discoverer through an agreement with the United States Navy's Naval Sea Systems Command. On 31 December 2020, the U.S. Navy awarded a US$178,082,877 contract to Thoma-Sea Marine Constructors of Houma, Louisiana, to design and build the two ships.

Oceanographer′s construction began with a ceremony at the Thoma-Sea Marine Constructors shipyard in Houma on 15 June 2022. During the ceremony, the initials of the ship's sponsor, Linda Kwok Schatz, wife of United States Senator Brian Schatz of Hawaii, were welded onto a steel plate that was to be incorporated into the ship's structure during construction. Oceanographer was launched in August 2024.

== Operational career ==
Plans call for Oceanographer to enter service in NOAA's fleet in early 2025. Her home port will be Honolulu, Hawaii.

== See also ==
- Office of Marine and Aviation Operations
