= Caroline tum Suden =

American neurophysiologist

- Born: 1900
- Died: January 24, 1976 (aged 75–76)
- Education: Columbia University; Boston University
- Occupations: Neurophysiologist and neuropharmacologist

Caroline tum Suden (1900-1976), was an American neurophysiologist and neuropharmacologist who is remembered for a prestigious award given in her honor by the American Physiological Society.

== Life ==
Caroline tum Suden graduated from Columbia University in 1927 with her master's degree and moved on to Boston University to complete her doctorate of physiology. However, even with her advanced education, she could only find work teaching at the university's Sargent School of Physical Education, which she did for eight years. However, during those years, she kept in close contact with her former educators and worked closely with physiologist Leland Clifton Wyman, publishing many papers together.

Eventually, she was appointed an instructor of physiology at the medical school, and in 1947 she moved to Mount Holyoke from 1947 to 1950 as an assistant professor. For her last professional position, she conducted research at the medical laboratories of the U.S. Army Chemical Research and Development Labs beginning in 1950. For the next 11 years, she investigated the effects of "various substances on the human nervous system."

She retired in about 1965 to Hartford County, Maryland and died January 24, 1976.

== Legacy ==
In her will, tum Suden left $100,000 to the American Physiological Society, which she joined in 1936 and had published many of her papers.

Two awards called the Caroline tum Suden/Frances A. Hellebrandt Professional Opportunity Awards, are given by the American Physiological Society to graduate students or post-doctoral fellows who are the first author of an abstract submitted to its Experimental Biology meeting.

She was involved with the Harford Glen Environmental Education Center, which was developed to support environmental education. A "small portion of the property was originally an MOS Sanctuary known as Tum Suden, received as a bequest from Dr. Caroline tum Suden; this property, which adjoins Harford Glen, was transferred from MOS to the Harford Glen Environmental Education Center in 1994."

== Selected works ==
This researcher's published name can be spelled "Tum" or 'tum," and it is sometimes hyphenated. In addition, her entire name has been found alphabetized using either T (for Tum Suden) or S (for Suden), as demonstrated below.

- Wyman, L. C., & tum Suden, C. (1930). Studies on suprarenal insufficiency: VIII. The Blood Volume of the Rat in Suprarenal Insufficiency, Anaphylactic Shock and Histamine Shock. American Journal of Physiology. Legacy Content, 94(3), 579–585.
- Wyman, L. C., & Suden, C. T. (1932). Studies on suprarenal insufficiency: XI. The growth of transplanted cortical tissue in the rat. American Journal of Physiology. Legacy Content, 101(4), 662–667.
- Suden, C. T. (1934). Reactions of the rat uterus, excised and in situ, to histamine and in anaphylaxis. American Journal of Physiology. Legacy Content, 108(2), 416–423.
- Wyman, L. C., & tum Suden, C. (1937). The functional efficiency of transplanted adrenal cortical tissue. Endocrinology, 21(5), 587–593.
- Suden, C. T. (1940). Opacities of the lens induced by adrenalin in the mouse. American Journal of Physiology. Legacy Content, 130(3), 543–548.
- Tum-Suden, C., Wyman, L. C., & Derow, M. A. (1945). Blood potassium and histamine intoxication in relation to adrenocortical function in rats. American Journal of Physiology. Legacy Content, 144(1), 102–107.
- Suden, C. T. (1947). Effect of adrenocortical and sympathico-adrenal factors on the cardiovascular sensitivity to potassium in the rat. American Journal of Physiology. Legacy Content, 149(3), 589–596.
- Tum-Suden, C. (1958). The effect of atropine upon mammalian striated muscle. Journal of Pharmacology and Experimental Therapeutics, 124(2), 135–141.
