= Reuben Lasker =

American fisheries scientist

- Born: December 1, 1929; Brooklyn, New York, U.S.
- Died: March 12, 1988 (aged 58)
- Education: University of Miami; Stanford University
- Spouse: Caroline Hayman
- Awards: 1970: Meritorious Service Award, U.S. Dept. of the Interior (Silver Medal Award); 1974: Distinguished Service Award, U.S. Dept. of Commerce (Gold Medal Award); 1983: Huntsman Medal for Excellence in Biological Oceanography, Bedford Institute of Oceanography; 1988 (posthumous): Outstanding Achievement Award, American Institute of Fishery Research Biologists
- Scientific career
- Fields: Marine biology Oceanography; Physiology
- Workplaces: Bureau of Commercial Fisheries; Southwest Fisheries Center; Scripps Institution of Oceanography

Reuben Lasker (December 1, 1929 – March 12, 1988) was a fisheries scientist known for his contributions to larval ecology, particularly the stable ocean hypothesis.

== Early life and education ==
Lasker was born to Theodore and Mary Lasker in Brooklyn, New York, on December 1, 1929. He attended the Boys' High School in Brooklyn, graduating at the age of 16.

In 1946, Lasker began his academic career at the University of Miami, where he initially majored in English but transitioned to zoology. He graduated from the University of Miami in 1950. He won a scholarship for graduate studies in marine biology at the University of Miami, where he studied marine shipworms and earned his master's degree in 1952. He obtained a doctoral degree at Stanford University, where he studied silverfish gastrology, and earned his degree in 1956.

Lasker was married to Caroline Hayman with whom he had a daughter, Pamela, and son, Paul.

== Professional career ==
In 1956, Lasker was awarded a post-doctoral appointment from the Rockefeller Foundation to culture euphausiid shrimps at the Scripps Institution of Oceanography in La Jolla, California. After teaching briefly at Compton Community College and being granted a Lalor Faculty Fellowship at Scripps, Lasker was recruited to the U.S. Department of the Interior Bureau of Commercial Fisheries' new research laboratory on the Scripps campus; he began federal service as a fishery research biologist in June 1958. Lasker was charged with establishing what would become the Physiology Laboratory.

Lasker and his teams went on to study various marine invertebrates, which eventually led him to his most widely recognized work with larval fish ecology. Most of his research centered around clupeid larval survival, feeding, and relevant environmental and planktonic variables within the California Current System (CCS).

In 1970, Lasker revitalized the academic journal Fishery Bulletin as its scientific editor. Under his leadership, the journal became a quarterly publication and its content tripled.

Lasker had been an associate professor of Marine Biology in Residence at Scripps since 1966 when he was appointed adjunct professor in 1973.

== Awards ==
Lasker was awarded the Meritorious Service Award (Silver Medal Award) by the U.S. Department of the Interior in 1970, the Distinguished Service Award (Gold Medal Award) by the U.S. Department of Commerce in 1974, and the A.G. Huntsman Award for Excellence in the Marine Sciences by the Bedford Institute of Oceanography in 1983. In 1988, the American Institute of Fishery Research Biologists posthumously awarded Lasker its Outstanding Achievement Award.

== Death and legacy ==
Lasker died of kidney cancer on March 12, 1988, at the age of 58. His ashes were scattered from the research vessel NOAA'S David Starr Jordan on April 27, 1988, in the ocean off Point Loma. Lasker's friends established the Reuben Lasker Memorial Fund after his death.

=== NOAA's Reuben Lasker ===
The NOAA ship Reuben Lasker, a National Oceanic and Atmospheric Administration fisheries research vessel, is named after Lasker.
