= 1016 Anitra =

Asteroid

Discovery
- Discovered by: K. Reinmuth
- Discovery site: Heidelberg Obs.
- Discovery date: 31 January 1924

Designations
- Pronunciation: /əˈniːtrə/
- Named after: fictional character in drama Peer Gynt
- Alternative designations: 1924 QG · 1929 TE_{1}
- Minor planet category: main-belt · (inner); Flora

Orbital characteristics
- Epoch 4 September 2017 (JD 2458000.5)
- Uncertainty parameter 0
- Observation arc: 93.42 yr (34,123 days)
- Aphelion: 2.5035 AU
- Perihelion: 1.9356 AU
- Semi-major axis: 2.2196 AU
- Eccentricity: 0.1279
- Orbital period (sidereal): 3.31 yr (1,208 days)
- Mean anomaly: 176.01°
- Mean motion: 0° 17^{m} 53.16^{s} / day
- Inclination: 6.0352°
- Longitude of ascending node: 8.8588°
- Argument of perihelion: 53.320°
- Known satellites: 1

Physical characteristics
- Dimensions: 9.539±0.078 km 10.302±0.068 km 12.97 km (calculated)
- Synodic rotation period: 5.928±0.001 h 5.9288±0.0005 h 5.929±0.001 h 5.9295±0.0005 h 5.92951 h 5.9294±0.0001 h 5.9300±0.0001 h 5.930 h 5.93 h (Note: Menke (2011) web: rotation period 5.93 hours with a brightness amplitude of 0.50 magnitude and a quality code of 2. Summary figures at Collaborative Asteroid Lightcurve Link (CALL)); 5.9301±0.0003 h
- Geometric albedo: 0.20 (assumed); 0.2728±0.0572; 0.308±0.048
- Spectral type: SMASS = S · S
- Absolute magnitude (H): 11.8 · 11.9 · 12.0

1016 Anitra, provisional designation 1924 QG, is a stony Florian asteroid and suspected asynchronous binary system from the inner regions of the asteroid belt, approximately 10 kilometers in diameter.

It was discovered on 31 January 1924, by German astronomer Karl Reinmuth at the Heidelberg-Königstuhl State Observatory in southwest Germany. The asteroid was likely named after the fictional character Anitra from Henrik Ibsen's drama Peer Gynt.

== Orbit and classification ==
Anitra is a member of the Flora family (402), a giant asteroid family and the largest family of stony asteroids in the main-belt.

It orbits the Sun in the inner main-belt at a distance of 1.9–2.5 AU once every 3 years and 4 months (1,208 days). Its orbit has an eccentricity of 0.13 and an inclination of 6° with respect to the ecliptic. The asteroid's observation arc begins at Heidelberg, 12 days after to its official discovery observation.

== Physical characteristics ==
In the SMASS classification, Anitra is a common, stony S-type asteroid.

=== Rotation period ===
In November 2015, a rotational lightcurve of Anitra was obtained from photometric observations by an international collaborations of astronomers who combined their observational results. Lightcurve analysis gave a rotation period of 5.92951 hours with a brightness amplitude of 0.30 magnitude (U=3).

=== Binary system ===
Anitra is a suspected asynchronous binary asteroid, a system with a fairly large separation, for which tidal forces have been insufficient to synchronize the periods within the system's lifetime. The likely minor-planet moon has a rotation period of 2.609 hours and is thought to orbit its primary every 240 hours. The results, however, are still tentative. More than 100 known binaries from the asteroid belt have already been discovered.

=== Diameter and albedo ===
According to the survey carried out by the NEOWISE mission of NASA's Wide-field Infrared Survey Explorer, Anitra measures 9.539 and 10.302 kilometers in diameter and its surface has an albedo of 0.2728 and 0.308, respectively.

The Collaborative Asteroid Lightcurve Link assumes a standard albedo for stony S-type asteroids of 0.20 and calculates a diameter of 12.97 kilometers based on an absolute magnitude of 11.8.

== Naming ==
This minor planet was probably named after the Arabian dancer Anitra, daughter of a Bedouin chief in Henrik Ibsen's drama Peer Gynt, a five-act play in verse. The music was composed by Edvard Grieg who named one piece "Anitra's Dance". The minor planets (4872) and (5696) are named after Grieg and Ibsen, respectively.

The official naming citation is based on research by Lutz Schmadel and feedback from astronomers R. Bremer and I. van Houten-Groeneveld.
