= Eliane Le Breton =

French MD & physiologist

- Born: 18 March 1897; Landunvez, Finistère, France
- Died: 23 January 1977 (aged 79); Paris
- Scientific career
- Fields: Physiology
- Institutions: Facultés des Sciences in Paris and Rennes, University of Strasbourg

Eliane Le Breton (born on the 18th March 1897 in Landunvez and died on the 23rd January 1977 in Paris) was a French physiologist known for her studies of cellular nutrition and the development of cancer cells. She was the director of research at the University of Strasbourg and taught at its Faculty of Medicine and worked at the Faculté des Sciences in Paris and Rennes.

== Publications ==
- Variations biochimiques du rapport nucléo-plasmatique au cours du développement embryonnaire, 1923
- Signification physiologique de l'oxydation de l'alcool éthylique dans l'organisme, 1936
- Biochemistry and physiology of the cancer cell, published in The Cell. Biochemistry, Physiology, Morphology. Volume IV. Specialized Cells: Pt. 1, 1960
