= Sandra K. Masur =

American cell biologist

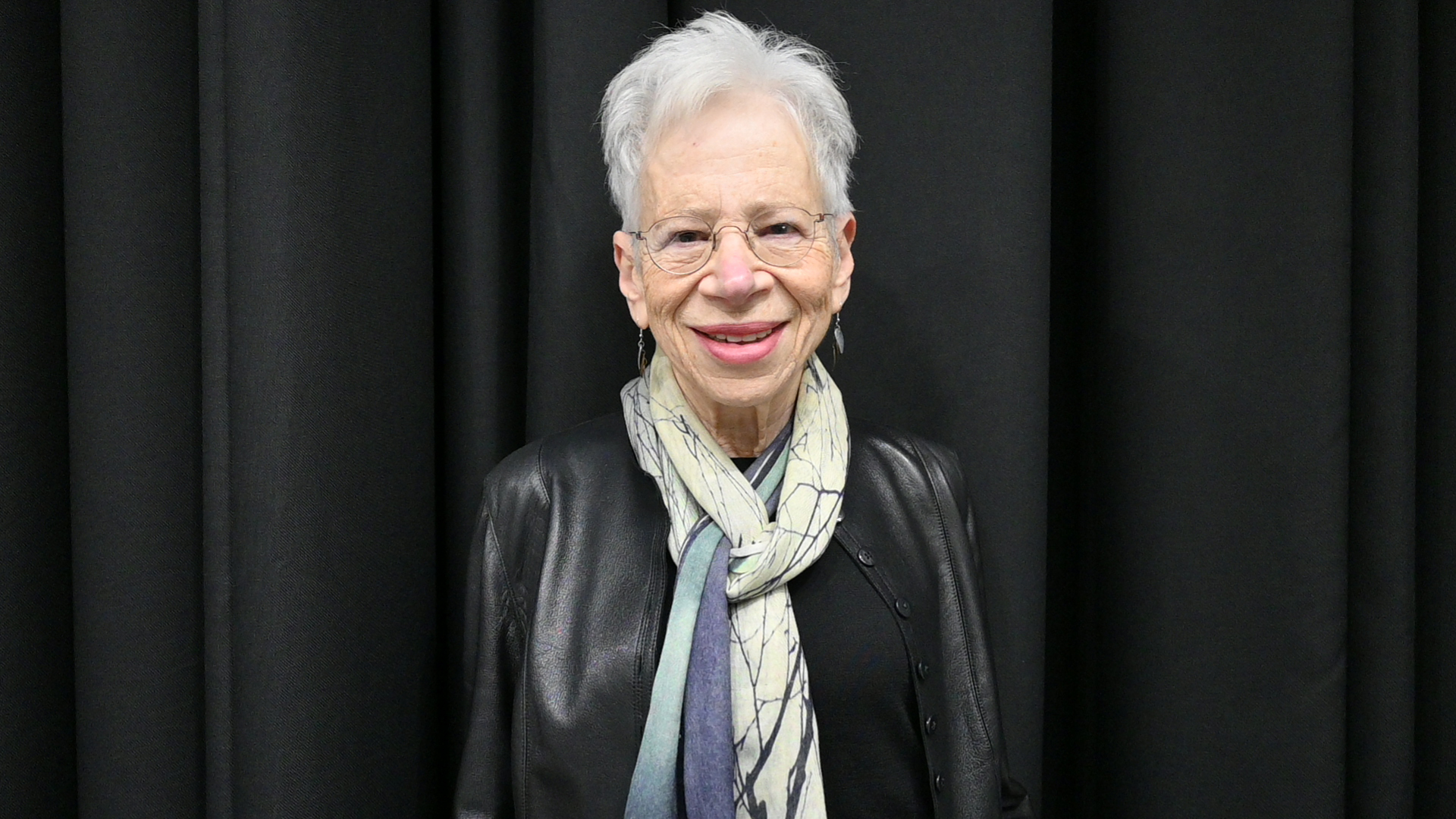
- Masur in 2023
- Born: Sandra Lee Kazahn; The Bronx, New York, New York, USA
- Occupations: Professor, Ophthalmology and Pharmacological Sciences, Icahn School of Medicine at Mount Sinai
- Spouse(s): Milton L. Masur, MD 1959 Victor L. Schuster, MD 1989
- Awards: Women's Empowerment Influencer Award, Icahn School of Medicine at Mount Sinai (2023) Elected Fellow of the American Society for Cell Biology (2017) Women in Medicine Silver Achievement Award, AAMC (2001)

Scholarly background
- Education: City College of New York; Columbia University
- Doctoral advisor: Lee Peachy
- Other advisors: William Etkin, Eric Holtzman
- Influences: Caroline Damsky, Liliana Ossowski

Scholarly work
- Discipline: Cell biology
- Sub-discipline: Wound healing
- Institutions: Icahn School of Medicine at Mount Sinai

Sandra Kazahn Masur is an American cell biologist and activist for women in academia. Masur is a professor of Ophthalmology as well as Pharmacological Sciences at Icahn School of Medicine at Mount Sinai (ISMMS) in New York City. Her research focused on membrane transport and wound healing. As a leader in promoting gender equity in science, technology, engineering, mathematics, and medicine (STEMM), Masur is the founding Director of the Office for Women's Careers at ISMMS, the Chair of the Committee on Special Awards, and Title IX Coordinator. In recognition of her commitment to developing programs that mentor all scientists, the American Society for Cell Biology named the Senior Leadership Award of the Women in Cell Biology, the Sandra K. Masur Award in her honor.

== Life and education ==
Masur was born in The Bronx, New York City. Her parents were Polish Jewish immigrants who pushed Masur's academic ambitions. She majored in art at the High School of Music and Art in NYC, and chose a career in science after majoring in Biology and Aesthetics at City College of New York (CCNY), where she earned a Bachelor of Arts in 1960. To this day, Masur feels that for her, "art and science have always been intertwined" and that her artistic background influences her scientific acumen.

Masur established the first electron microscopy facility at CCNY when she returned as an Assistant Professor after earning a Masters in Zoology in 1963, followed by a PhD in Cell Biology in 1967 both from Columbia University. She began her research as an undergrad in the laboratory of William Etkin and was mentored at Columbia by Lee Peachy in electron microscopy which she combined with cellular endocrinology to demonstrate hypothalamic inhibition of prolactin secretion. She studied cytochemistry as a postdoctoral fellow in the laboratory of Eric Holtzman at Columbia University.

Masur has two sons and two step-daughters.

== Career and research ==
To juggle parenting and research, Masur moved to the new Medical School at Mount Sinai as an Instructor (part-time) in the Department of Physiology and Biophysics in 1968. where the chairman also provided her with a full-time research assistant. Masur continued as a research associate at Columbia University completing her post-doctoral training in cytochemistry.

In collaboration with Eric Holtzman she hypothesized that organelle membrane insertion and removal from the cell surface was the basis for hormone induced alteration in cell membrane permeability. Interest in cell-matrix interaction led her to the cornea where she studied the roles of the extracellular matrix, cell-cell interactions and soluble factors in the wound healing process using a corneal stroma model. Masur's laboratory was funded for 35 years by the National Institutes of Health to explore the hormonal control of membrane transport as well as the cellular mechanisms of wound healing. Her lab determined that myofibroblasts and fibroblasts in the cornea are not "terminally differentiated".

=== Advancing women in academia ===
Masur aims to advance and increase the visibility of women in STEMM. She uses her voice to create opportunities for women in science and fights for more equitable academic space. During her tenure at Mount Sinai, Masur was the first Dean of Faculty Developmencreating mentorship opportunities for women and men . She is a member of the Office of Gender Equity as Director of the Office for Women's Careers, which evolved from the Women Faculty Group at Mount Sinai (established in 1986).

As the Director of the Office of Women's Careers, she advocates for women at ISMMS. Targeted programs and monthly events are hosted for women to discuss juggling career with family and to provides them with mentorship and leadership opportunities. Masur has published works describing the development of Women in Cell Biology (WICB) as well as anticipations of the future of women in STEMM.

Masur held leadership roles including Chair of Diversity Issues Committee on Women and Minorities for the Association for Research in Vision and Ophthalmology from 1997 to 1999, co-director of the National Eye Institute's "Fundamental Issues in Vision Research" at the Marine Biological Laboratory from 2001 to 2010, and Chair of Women in Cell Biology for the American Society of Cell Biology from 2010 to 2016.

In 2015 the American Society for Cell Biology honored Masur by naming one of their leadership awards the "Sandra K. Masur Senior Leadership Award" for efforts in scientific leadership and her long history of creating opportunities for women. The award recognizes late career stage faculty with outstanding scientific achievement and a strong history of leadership in mentoring the careers of men and women in science. This award emphasizes leadership and support of marginalized groups.

== Awards and honors ==
- 2023- Women's Empowerment Influencer Award Icahn School of Medicine at Mount Sinai
- 2017 – Elected Fellow of the American Society for Cell Biology
- 2015 – Senior Leadership Award of the Women in Cell Biology of the American Society for Cell Biology, named the Sandra K. Masur Leadership Award
- 2008 – Jacobi Medallion, Mount Sinai Alumni Association
- 2007 – Rosalind Franklin Society Invited Member of Founding Board
- 2001 Women in Medicine Silver Achievement Award, Association of American Medical Colleges
- 1997 Outstanding Woman Scientist – Association for Women in Science, Metropolitan New York Chapter
- 1997 Lew R. Wasserman Merit Award
- 1996 Outstanding Faculty Achievement Award
- 1978 Brotherhood Education Award, Conference of Christians and Jews

== Select publications ==
- Masur, S.K. (1969). "Fine structure of the autotransplanted pituitary of the red eft. Notophthalmus viridescens". Gen. Comp. Endocrin. 12: 12–32.
- Masur, S.K.; Holtzman, E.; Schwartz, I.L.; Walter, R. (1971). "Correlation between pinocytosis and hydroosmosis induced by neurohypophyseal hormone and mediated by adenosine 3', 5'-cyclic monophosphate". J. Cell Biol. 49: 582–589.
- Masur, S.K.; Dewal, H.S.; Dinh, T.T.; Erenburg, I.; Petridou, S. (1996). "Myofibroblasts differentiate from fibroblasts plated at low density". Proc. Natl. Acad. Sci. 93: 4219–4223.
- Maltseva, O; Folger, P; Zekaria, D; Petridou, S; Masur, SK (2001). "Fibroblast growth factor reversal of the corneal myofibroblast phenotype". Invest Ophthalmol Vis Sci. 42: 2490–5. PMID 11581188..
- Masur, S.; Kane, C. M. (2001-12-21). "Tapping science's women for the podium". Science. 294 (5551): 2480. doi:10.1126/science.294.5551.2480a. ISSN 0036-8075. PMID 11770518..
- Bernstein, AM; Twining, SS; Warejcka, DJ; Tall, E; Masur, SK (2007). "Urokinase receptor cleavage: a crucial step in fibroblast-to-myofibroblast differentiation". Mol Biol Cell. 18: 2716–27. doi:10.1091/mbc.e06-10-0912. PMC 1924808. PMID 17507651..
- Masur, Sandra Kazahn (January 2013). "Women in cell biology: a seat at the table and a place at the podium". Molecular Biology of the Cell. 24 (2): 57–60. doi:10.1091/mbc.E12-07-0517. ISSN 1939-4586. PMC 3541963. PMID 23307103..
- Masur, Sandra K. (2015-08-01). "Invisible woman?". Trends in Cell Biology. 25 (8): 437–439. doi:10.1016/j.tcb.2015.06.001. ISSN 0962-8924.
- Masur, SK; Goodenough, U; Kane, CM; Marincola, E; Zavala, ME; Omotade, J (2021). "50 Years of Women in Cell Biology: Where have we been? Where are we going?". Mol Biol Cell. 32. doi:10.1091/mbc.E21-04-0186. PMC 8694079. PMID 34793240.
