= Arthur H. Steinhaus =

American physical fitness expert (1897–1970)

- Born: October 4, 1897; Chicago
- Died: February 8, 1970 (aged 72); Lansing, Michigan
- Education: University of Chicago; George Williams College
- Known for: Effects of habits of living on health and well-being
- Scientific career
- Fields: Physiology: sports physiology and fitness
- Institutions: George Williams College, Michigan State University
- Thesis: Studies on the physiology of exercise

Arthur H Steinhaus (October 4, 1897 – February 8, 1970) was an American physical fitness expert and sports physiologist.

== Biography ==
Arthur H [no middle name] Steinhaus was born in Chicago, Illinois, on October 4, 1897. He received his B.S., M.S. and Ph.D. from the University of Chicago (1919–1928) in zoology and physiology and his B.P.E. and M.P.E. from George Williams College in physical education (1915–1926).

== Career ==
For fifty years, 1915–1965, Steinhaus was associated with George Williams College as a student, teacher, Dean, and finally Dean Emeritus. After his retirement as Dean Emeritus, he was appointed Distinguished Service Professor by the Chicago College of Osteopathy on limited assignment to the Department of Physiology, and then served as a visiting professor at Michigan State University from 1966-1969. He taught in summer and evening sessions at the Universities of California, Colorado, Wisconsin, Saskatchewan, Southern California, and Northwestern. He served appointments as Fulbright Professor to Germany and Japan, did research in Germany and Denmark, and lectured in Europe, Asia, Africa, Australia, New Zealand, and Malaysia.

== Recognition ==
In 1944 Steinhaus was on leave to serve as Chief of the Division of Physical Education and Health Activities in the US Office of Education. During the war he was a Civilian Advisor to the US Navy on matters of physical fitness and physical rehabilitation. He conducted research on the physiology of exercise and spent a year in Europe as a Guggenheim Fellow in the John Simon Guggenheim Memorial Foundation. He was elected into the National Academy of Kinesiology (née American Academy of Physical Education) in 1930 as Fellow #29 and went on to serve as the Academy's President during 1943-1945. His writings appeared in purely research journals such as the American Journal of Physiology, in professional journals such as the American Journal of Public Health, and in popular magazines such as Coronet and Look.

== Death ==
He died on February 8, 1970, in Lansing, Michigan.

== Research interests ==
After 1923, he was interested in research to disclose the effects of habits of living on health and well-being. "Habits of living" include eating, drinking, exercising, fatigue, rest, relaxation, smoking and various emotional states. In later years his interest centered on interrelationship of mind and body with emphasis on mental health and "total fitness." A good deal of his scholarly work was directed toward interpreting the findings of research for the average practitioner in physical education—a kind of "middleman" function.

== Archive ==
Arthur H Steinhaus' papers are located in the Special Collections of the University of Tennessee, Knoxville (MS.0914 (more than 30 linear feet) and MS.1127. Two well-developed and extensive Finding Aids have been prepared, which includes a biographical summary, quoted above, with permission of J. B. Beals (e-mail April 3, 2012).

== Theses and dissertation ==
- Bachelor of Physical Education, Young Men's Christian Association College, 1921. "Graduation thesis in candidacy for BPE "Reaction time as an index to the state of fatigue of the nervous system"
- "SM", University of Chicago, 1925. Thesis: "The influence of exercise on the basal metabolic rate" and Crerar Library, University of Chicago, record
1. Master of Physical Education, Young Men's Christian Association (YMCA) College, 1926. "Graduation thesis in candidacy for the degree of MPE. "The influence of physical work on the basal metabolism"
- PhD, University of Chicago, 1928. Dissertation: "Studies on the physiology of exercise" and Crerar Library, University of Chicago, record.
