= George Williams College (Chicago) =

University campus in the United States

- Type: Private
- Active: 1890–2000, merged into Aurora University
- Founders: I. E. Brown, William Lewis, and Robert Weidensall
- Location: Williams Bay, Wisconsin, United States
- Website: gwc.aurora.edu

George Williams College was a campus of Aurora University located on Geneva Lake in Williams Bay, Wisconsin, United States.

The campus was previously part of an independent college that was first based in the Hyde Park neighborhood of Chicago, Illinois, and later in Downers Grove, Illinois. Aurora University closed the campus in December 2023.

== History ==
George Williams College has its genesis in a summer camp founded on the shores of Geneva Lake in Wisconsin by YMCA leaders I. E. Brown, William Lewis, and Robert Weidensall in 1886. This camp was created to serve as a professional YMCA training school. The camp moved to Hyde Park in 1890, where it transformed into a college. The school's Hyde Park campus went by a variety of names during the late-19th and early-20th century: the Training School of the YMCA (1890–96,) the Secretarial Institute and Training School (1896–1903), the Institute and Training School of the YMCA (1903–13), and the YMCA College or Association College (1913–33). In 1933, its name was changed for the final time to "George Williams College". During the 20th century, the college "was a national center for the development of group work as a profession. It was also an early pioneer in the idea of holistic health, with the integration of body, mind and spirit that was key concept within the YMCA movement."

In 1965, the college moved from Hyde Park to a more suburban location in Downers Grove, Illinois, where the mostly-white residents of Downers Grove exhibited hostility towards the integrated student body, which was approximately one-fifth Black. By the 1980s, the school was struggling. In 1986, the college library was acquired by The Master's University in Santa Clarita, California, and in 1989, the abandoned Hyde Park campus was demolished to make room for new development opportunities.

The college affiliated with Aurora University in 1992 and officially merged with the university in 2000. The original Geneva Lake camp location then housed a campus of the college, which was named "George Williams College".

Aurora University announced in November 2022 that all instruction on the campus would cease in December 2023, but that the campus would continue to operate as a conference center. The campus was listed for sale in June 2023 with the aim of finding a nonprofit buyer. Chicago businessman Liam Krehbiel submitted a bid for the former campus in January 2024. Krehbiel plans to redevelop the campus into a retreat center, performing arts center, resort, and nature preserve.

== Present ==
The GWC campus consists of 137 acres. The campus hosts a conference center and the Music by the Lake summer concert series at Ferro Pavilion. GWC focused on service-related undergraduate degree programs, including business management, environmental studies and sustainability, nursing, psychology, and social work.

The University of Minnesota and Aurora University hold archives of George Williams College historical material.

== Notable alumni ==
- Gordon E. Kaplan – outdoor education instructor, program director, and past executive director of the American Camp Association Illinois division
- Arthur H. Steinhaus – physical fitness expert and sports physiologist
