= Annemarie Surlykke =

Danish physiologist (1955 – 2015)

- Born: 21 October 1955; Copenhagen, Denmark
- Died: 28 July 2015 (aged 59); Ryslinge, Denmark
- Resting place: Hellerup kirke
- Education: University of Southern Denmark
- Spouse: Per Østergaard
- Children: One son
- Scientific career
- Fields: Bioacoustics; Sensory physiology
- Workplaces: University of Southern Denmark; Tübingen University; Aarhus University
- Doctoral advisor: Lee A. Miller

Annemarie Surlykke (21 October 1955 – 28 July 2015) was a Danish physiologist. She contributed significantly to bioacoustic research, in particular in the fields of insect hearing and acoustic communication, bat echolocation and insect-bat interactions.

== Life ==
Surlykkeg was born in Copenhagen. She graduated from the University of Southern Denmark. From 1987 she was associate professor at University of Southern Denmark and full professor in 2011.

In the 1980s and 1990s, Surlykke's research focused on ultrasonic hearing in noctuid and nothodontid moths. She later expanded to include arctiids, geometrids, pyralids, Sphingiids and other nocturnal insects subjected to predation by bats. During this time, she also studied echolocation in bats. She conducted this research in the lab and in the field, leading into the 2000s and early 2010s.

Alongside her main work on insect and bat bioacoustics Annemarie Surlykke also contributed to the bioacoustics of odontocetes, through cooperation with colleagues Bertel Møhl and Lee A. Miller.

== Selected publications ==
- Surlykke, Annemarie; Miller, Lee A. (1982). "Central branchings of three sensory axons from a moth ear (Agrotis segetum, Noctuidae)". Journal of Insect Physiology. 28 (4): 357–364. Bibcode:1982JInsP..28..357S. doi:10.1016/0022-1910(82)90048-8. ISSN 0022-1910.
- Surlykke, Annemarie (1984-11-01). "Hearing in Notodontid Moths: A Tympanic Organ with a Single Auditory Neurone". Journal of Experimental Biology. 113 (1): 323–335. doi:10.1242/jeb.113.1.323. ISSN 0022-0949.
- Surlykke, Annemarie (1988), "Interaction Between Echolocating Bats and Their Prey", Animal Sonar, Boston, MA: Springer US, pp. 551–566, doi:10.1007/978-1-4684-7493-0_56, ISBN 978-1-4684-7495-4
- Surlykke, A.; Treat, A. E. (1995). "Hearing in wintermoths". Naturwissenschaften. 82 (8): 382–384. Bibcode:1995NW.....82..382S. doi:10.1007/bf01134567. ISSN 0028-1042. S2CID 31281795.
- Surlykke, Annemarie; Filskov, Mads (1997-08-27). "Hearing in Geometrid Moths". Naturwissenschaften. 84 (8): 356–359. Bibcode:1997NW.....84..356S. doi:10.1007/s001140050410. ISSN 0028-1042. S2CID 43995991.
- Skals, Niels; Surlykke, Annemarie (2000). "Hearing and evasive behaviour in the greater wax moth, Galleria mellonella (Pyralidae)". Physiological Entomology. 25 (4): 354–362. doi:10.1046/j.1365-3032.2000.00204.x. ISSN 0307-6962.
- Göpfert, Martin C.; Surlykke, Annemarie; Wasserthal, Lutz T. (2002-01-07). "Tympanal and atympanal 'mouth–ears' in hawkmoths (Sphingidae)". Proceedings of the Royal Society of London. Series B: Biological Sciences. 269 (1486): 89–95. doi:10.1098/rspb.2001.1646. ISSN 0962-8452. PMC 1690854. PMID 11788041.
- Møhl, Bertel; Surlykke, Annemarie (1989). "Detection of sonar signals in the presence of pulses of masking noise by the echolocating bat, Eptesicus fuscus". Journal of Comparative Physiology A. 165 (1): 119–124. doi:10.1007/bf00613805. ISSN 0340-7594. S2CID 11199890.
- Surlykke, Annemarie; Jakobsen, Lasse; Kalko, Elisabeth K. V.; Page, Rachel A. (2013). "Echolocation intensity and directionality of perching and flying fringe-lipped bats, Trachops cirrhosus (Phyllostomidae)". Frontiers in Physiology. 4: 143. doi:10.3389/fphys.2013.00143. ISSN 1664-042X. PMC 3695372. PMID 23825459.
- Jakobsen, Lasse; Ratcliffe, John M.; Surlykke, Annemarie (2013). "Convergent acoustic field of view in echolocating bats". Nature. 493 (7430): 93–96. Bibcode:2013Natur.493...93J. doi:10.1038/nature11664. ISSN 0028-0836. PMID 23172147. S2CID 205231599.
- Surlykke, Annemarie; Miller, Lee A.; Møhl, Bertel; Andersen, Bent Bach; Christensen-Dalsgaard, Jakob; Buhl Jørgensen, Morten (1993). "Echolocation in two very small bats from Thailand Craseonycteris thonglongyai and Myotis siligorensis". Behavioral Ecology and Sociobiology. 33 (1): 1–12. Bibcode:1993BEcoS..33....1S. doi:10.1007/bf00164341. ISSN 0340-5443. S2CID 32640240.
- Jakobsen, Lasse; Brinkløv, Signe; Surlykke, Annemarie (2013). "Intensity and directionality of bat echolocation signals". Frontiers in Physiology. 4: 89. doi:10.3389/fphys.2013.00089. ISSN 1664-042X. PMC 3635024. PMID 23630501.
- Miller, Lee A.; Pristed, John; Møshl, Bertel; Surlykke, Annemarie (1995). "The Click-Sounds of Narwhals (Monodon monoceros) in Inglefield Bay, Northwest Greenland". Marine Mammal Science. 11 (4): 491–502. Bibcode:1995MMamS..11..491M. doi:10.1111/j.1748-7692.1995.tb00672.x. ISSN 0824-0469. S2CID 85148204.
- Møhl, B.; Wahlberg, M.; Madsen, P. T.; Miller, L. A.; Surlykke, A. (2000). "Sperm whale clicks: Directionality and source level revisited". The Journal of the Acoustical Society of America. 107 (1): 638–648. Bibcode:2000ASAJ..107..638M. doi:10.1121/1.428329. ISSN 0001-4966. PMID 10641672.
