= Frances A. Hellebrandt =

American physiologist (1901–1992)

Frances Anna Hellebrandt
- Born: August 26, 1901; Chicago, Illinois, US
- Died: February 2, 1992 (aged 90); Upper Arlington, Ohio, US
- Burial place: Bohemian National Cemetery
- Education: University of Wisconsin
- Occupation: Exercise physiology researcher

Frances Anna Hellebrandt (August 26, 1901 – February 2, 1992) was an American physician and an expert on exercise physiology.

== Life ==
She was born on August 26, 1901, in Chicago, Illinois.

In 1929, she received her BS in Physical Education and a medical degree from the University of Wisconsin. Hellebrandt then earned several Anatomy and Physiology faculty positions at the university before she left the United States to study at the Clinic for Sportsmen at Charles University from 1937 to 1938 in Prague.

With the start of World War II, she opted to return to Wisconsin and specialize in physical rehabilitation. By 1943, she was chair of the university's physical therapy department.

In 1944, Hellebrandt agreed to head the newly created Baruch Center for Physical Medicine at the VCU Medical College of Virginia. Because she brought many of her staffers with her, she was able to establish a new degree program in physical medicine, making the Center the "first such facility in the South." She went on to make the Baruch Center the primary center for rehabilitation for all of Virginia.

In 1951, she returned to Chicago to become a professor and chair of physical medicine at the University of Illinois, but her declining health forced her to retire, for the first time, in 1955. However, in 1957, after finding retirement unenjoyable, she took a position as a visiting lecturer and then became a professor at Wisconsin until her second retirement in 1964. At that time, she was named a professor emeritus by the university.

Hellebrandt was on the editorial board of the Journal of Applied Physiology, and American Journal of Physical Medicine and Rehabilitation. Along with Prof. L.E.A. Kelso, she created several research tools and devices still in use today. She served of the Board of Trustees for the Easter Seals Research Foundation, and received the Anderson Award from the American Association of Health, Physical Education and Recreation. In 1944, Hellebrandt was elected as an Associate Fellow in the prestigious American Academy of Physical Education (now known as the National Academy of Kinesiology).

Hellebrandt died February 2, 1992, in Upper Arlington, Ohio, at 90.

== Woman of achievement ==
The Women's Centennial Congress organized by Carrie Chapman Catt was held in New York City in November 25–27, 1940, to celebrate a century of female progress. To demonstrate their advances, 100 "successful women" were invited to represent their respective fields of study in which they were working in 1940, but that would have been impossible for them in 1840. Hellebrandt's participation was listed in the science category with Margaret Mead and Annie Jump Cannon, among others. The 100 women chosen were "all American, alive and doing jobs that would have been impossible for a woman to undertake in 1840." In the program, Hellebrandt is mentioned as the "inventor of [the] electric ergometer."

== Legacy ==
The Caroline tum Suden/Frances A. Hellebrandt Professional Opportunity Awards, are given by the American Physiological Society to graduate students or post-doctoral fellows who are the first author of an abstract submitted to its Experimental Biology meeting.

Hellebrandt's papers are archived at Virginia Commonwealth University in Richmond.

== Selected works ==
She authored more than 150 scientific papers.

- Hellebrandt, F. A. (1938). Standing as a geotropic reflex: the mechanism of the asynchronous rotation of motor units. American Journal of Physiology. Legacy Content, 121(2), 471-474.
- Hellebrandt, F. A., Tepper, R. H., Braun, G. L., & Elliott, M. C. (1938). The location of the cardinal anatomical orientation planes passing through the center of weight in young adult women. American Journal of Physiology. Legacy Content, 121(2), 465-470.
- Hellebrandt, F. A. (1940). Exercise. Annual Review of Physiology, 2(1), 411-432.
- Hellebrandt, F. A., Brogdon, E., & Tepper, R. H. (1940). Posture and its cost. American Journal of Physiology. Legacy Content, 129(3), 773-781.
- Hellebrandt, F. A., & Franseen, E. B. (1943). Physiological study of the vertical stance of man. Physiological Reviews, 23(3), 220-255.
- Hellebrandt, F. A., Mueller, E. E., Summers, I. M., Houtz, S. J., Heap, M. F., & Eubank, R. N. (1950). Influence of lower extremity amputation on stance mechanics. Journal of the American Medical Association, 142(17), 1353-1356.
- Hellebrandt, F. A. (1951). Cross education: ipsilateral and contralateral effects of unimanual training. Journal of Applied Physiology, 4(2), 136-144.
- Hellebrandt, F. A. (1953). Educating Physical Therapists to Meet the Challenge of the Future: Report on Project B 230 (research and Evaluation of Curricula of Physical Therapy and Rehabilitation). Stipes.
- Hellebrandt, F. A., Rarick, G. L., Glassow, R., & Carns, M. L. (1961). PHYSIOLOGICAL ANALYSIS OF BASIC MOTOR SKILLS1: I. GROWTH AND DEVELOPMENT OF JUMPING. American Journal of Physical Medicine & Rehabilitation, 40(1), 14-25.
