= NOAAS Reuben Lasker =

American fisheries research vessel

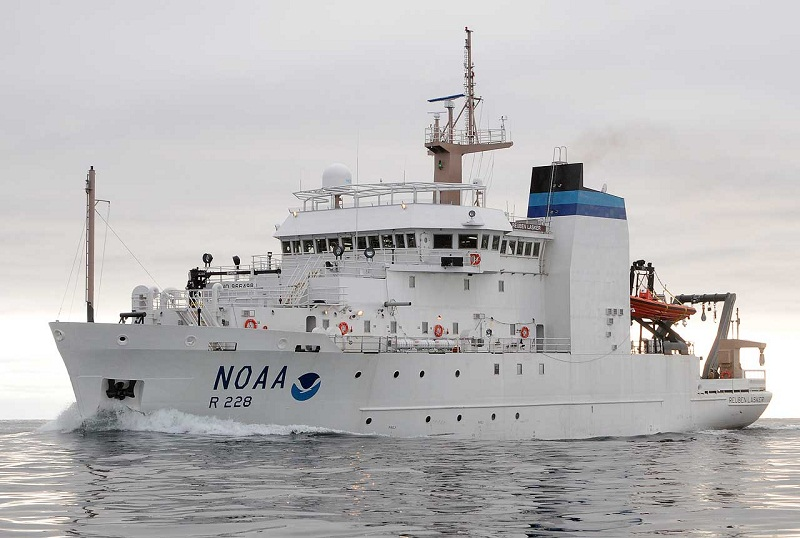
- NOAAS Reuben Lasker (R 228)

History

United States
- Name: NOAAS Reuben Lasker (R 228)
- Namesake: Reuben Lasker (1929-1988), American fisheries scientist
- Operator: National Oceanic and Atmospheric Administration (NOAA)
- Builder: Marinette Marine Corporation, Marinette, Wisconsin
- Cost: $73.6 million
- Laid down: 21 June 2011
- Launched: 16 June 2012
- Sponsored by: Pamela A. Lasker
- Completed: 8 November 2013 (delivered)
- Commissioned: 2 May 2014
- Home port: San Diego, California
- Identification: IMO number: 9664988; MMSI number: 369970573; Callsign: WTEG
- Status: Active

General characteristics
- Class & type: Oscar Dyson-class fisheries research ship
- Displacement: 1,840 Metric tons (light); 2,479 metric tons (full load)
- Length: 208.7 ft (63.6 m)
- Beam: 49.2 ft (15.0 m)
- Draft: 20 ft (6.1 m) (with centerboard up); 30.3 ft (9.2 m) (with centerboard down)
- Depth: 38.7 ft (11.8 m)
- Speed: 14.0 knots (26 km/h) (maximum); 12 knots (22 km/h) (cruising)
- Range: 12,000 nautical miles (22,000 km) at 12 knots
- Endurance: 40 days
- Boats & landing craft carried: 2 × 26.4-foot (8-m) RHIBs; 1 × 15.5-foot (4.7-m) rescue boat
- Complement: 24 (5 NOAA Corps officers or mates, 5 licensed engineers, and 14 other crew members), plus up to 15 scientists

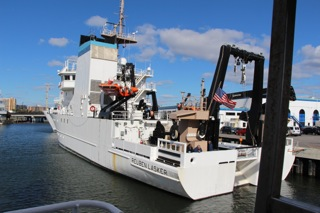
Port quarter view of Reuben Lasker in November 2013.

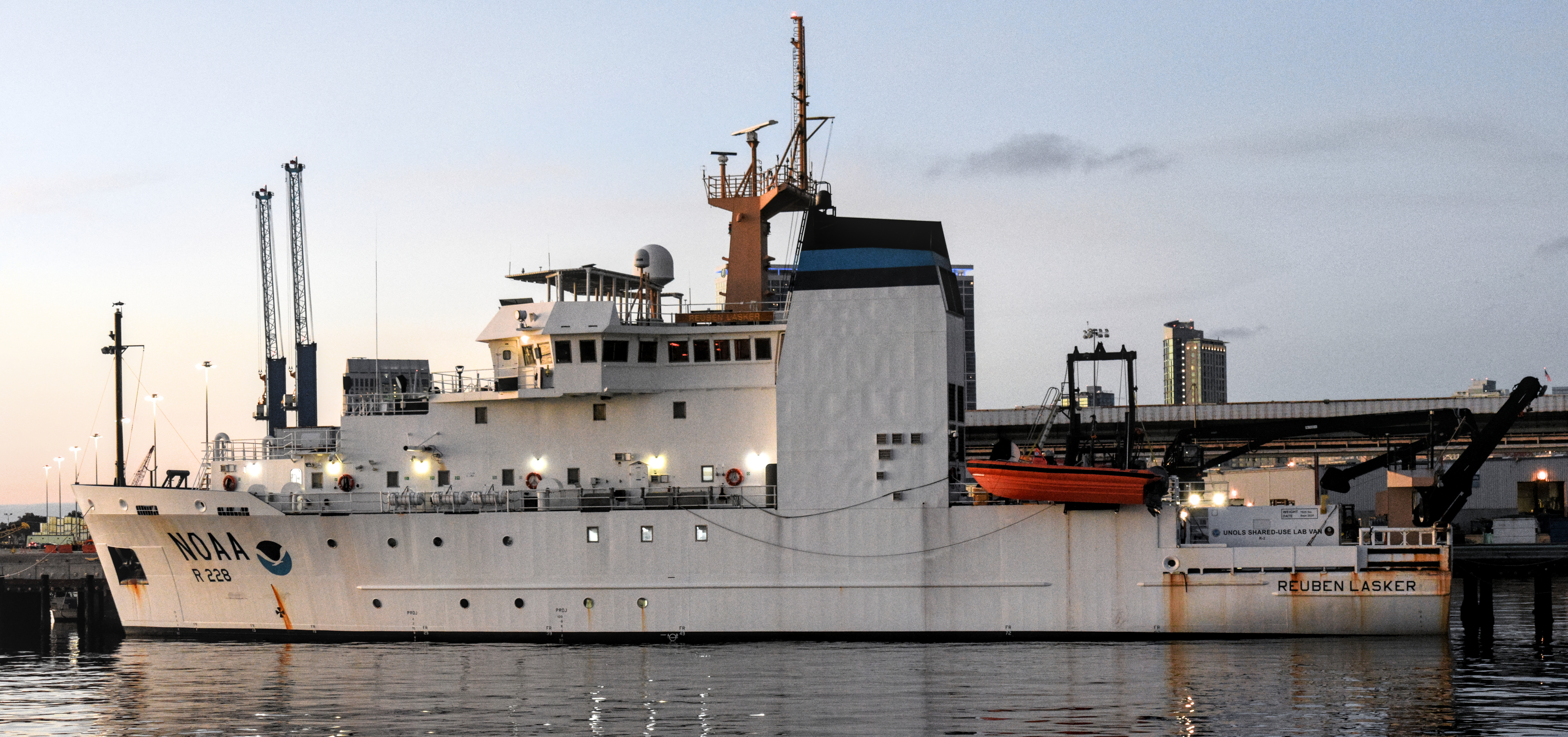
Reuben Lasker at port in San Diego, January 2024

NOAAS Reuben Lasker is a National Oceanic and Atmospheric Administration (NOAA) fishery research vessel. The ship's namesake, Reuben Lasker, was a fisheries biologist who served with the Southwest Fisheries Center, National Marine Fisheries Service, and taught at the Scripps Institution of Oceanography.

== Construction and commissioning ==
Reuben Lasker's construction was funded through the American Recovery and Reinvestment Act. Marinette Marine Corporation was awarded a $73.6 million contract to build her in April 2010. Reuben Lasker was laid down at the Marinette Marine Corporation shipyard in Marinette, Wisconsin, on 21 June 2011 and by February 2012 was 60% complete. Four months later, on 16 June 2012, Pamela A. Lasker, Reuben Lasker's daughter, christened the ship and Reuben Lasker was side-launched into the Menominee River. Marinette Marine delivered the ship to NOAA at Norfolk, Virginia, on 8 November 2013.

After a 20-day, 5,000-nautical mile (9,260-km) voyage from Norfolk via the Panama Canal, Reuben Lasker arrived at San Diego, California, her home port, on 29 March 2014. NOAA officially commissioned her on 2 May 2014 during a ceremony at the Navy Pier in downtown San Diego, California.

== Characteristics and capabilities ==
Capable of conducting multidisciplinary oceanographic operations in support of biological, chemical, and physical process studies, Reuben Lasker was commissioned as the fifth of a class of five of the most advanced fisheries research vessels in the world, with a unique capability to conduct both fishing and oceanographic research. She is a stern trawler with fishing capabilities similar to those of commercial fishing vessels. She is rigged for longlining and trap fishing and can conduct trawling operations to depths of 3,500 meters (11,500 feet). Her most advanced feature is the incorporation of United States Navy-type acoustic quieting technology to enable NOAA scientists to monitor fish populations without the ship's noise altering the behavior of the fish, including advanced quieting features incorporated into her machinery, equipment, and propeller. Her oceanographic hydrophones are mounted on a retractable centerboard, or drop keel, that lowers scientific transducers away from the region of hull-generated flow noise, enhancing the quality of the data collected. To take full advantage of these advanced data-gathering capabilities, she has the Scientific Sonar System, which can accurately measure the biomass of fish in a survey area. She also has an Acoustic Doppler Current Profiler with which to collect data on ocean currents and a multibeam sonar system that provides information on the content of the water column and on the type and topography of the seafloor while she is underway, and she can gather hydrographic data at any speed up to 11 knots (20 km/h).

Reuben Lasker has a traction-type oceanographic winch with a maximum pull weight of 30,000 pounds (14,000 kg) which can deploy up to 4,000 meters (13,000 feet) of 17.3-mm (0..681-inch) electromechanical cable. She also has two CTD winches with a maximum pull weight of 7,700 pounds (3,500 kg), each of which can deploy 4,000 meters (13,000 feet) of 9.5-mm (.375-inch) electromechanical cable, two trawl winches with a maximum pull weight of 50,000 pounds (23,000 kg), each of which can deploy 4,000 meters (13,000 feet) of 25.4-mm (1-inch) wire, and a net sonde winch with a maximum pull weight of 8,100 pounds (3,700 kg) which can deploy 4,000 meters (13,000 feet) of 11.4-mm (.450-inch) electromechanical wire. She has a 65-foot (20-meter) telescopic boom with a lifting capacity of 1,000 pounds (450 kg) at full extension and of 10,000 pounds (4,536 kg) when extended 23 feet (7.0 meters) and a 23-foot (7.0-meter) telescopic boom with a 1,000-pound (450 kg) lifting capacity. She has a movable A-frame on her starboard side with a maximum safe working load of 2,000 pounds (910 kg) and a large A-frame aft with a maximum safe working load of 8,000 pounds (3,600 kg) that serves as a stern gantry. The oceanographic winch and large after A-frame work in conjunction to serve her stern sampling station, while two winches work with the starboard-side A-frame to service her side sampling station, and Reuben Lasker's configuration allows her to have three scientific packages ready for sequential operations. One of her winches also can deploy lines and equipment over her stern. In addition to trawling, her sampling stations can deploy smaller sampling nets, longlines, and fish traps. Her winches can deploy CTD instruments to measure the electrical conductivity, temperature, and chlorophyll fluorescence of sea water. Reuben Lasker also can deploy specialized gear such as Multiple Opening/Closing Net and Environmental Sensing System (MOCNESS) frames, towed vehicles, dredges, and bottom corers, and she can deploy and recover both floating and bottom-moored sensor arrays. While trawling, Reuben Lasker uses wireless and hard-wired systems to monitor the shape of the trawl net and to work in conjunction with an autotrawl system that sets trawl depth and trawl wire tension and adjusts the net configuration.

Reuben Lasker has a 630-square-foot (sq. ft.) (58.5-square-meter) (m^{2}) wet laboratory, a 300-sq.-ft. (27.9-m^{2}) dry laboratory, a 287-sq.-ft. (26.7-m^{2}) biology and chemistry laboratory, a 445-sq.-ft. (41.3-m^{2}) electronics and computer laboratory, and an 85-sq.-ft. (7.9-m^{2}) hydrographic laboratory. She also has a 57-sq.-ft. (5.3-m^{2}) climate-controlled space, a walk-in scientific freezer, a 360-sq.-ft. (33.4-m^{2}) staging bay, and a 134-sq.ft. (12.4-m^{2}) scientific ready room. She has open deck space aft for fishing and scientific operations and another area of open deck space at the side sampling station on her starboard side. All of her discharge pipes empty off her port side so that fluids discharged will not contaminate samples collected at the station on her starboard side. She has an ice-strengthened hull for operations in polar waters.

Reuben Lasker carries two 26.4-foot (8.0-meter) rigid-hulled inflatable boats (RHIBs), each with a 270-horsepower (201-kilowatt) motor and a capacity of 18 people, and a SOLAS-approved 15.5-foot (4.7-meter) rescue boat with a 32-horsepower (23.9-kilowatt) motor and a capacity of six people.

In addition to her crew of 24, Reuben Lasker can accommodate up to 15 scientists.

== Service history ==
Officially classified as a "fisheries survey vessel," Reuben Lasker replaced NOAAS David Starr Jordan (R 444), decommissioned in 2010 after over 44 years of service and the last NOAA ship based at San Diego. Like David Starr Jordan before her, Reuben Lasker operates in support of the Southwest Fisheries Science Center in La Jolla, California – a component of NOAA's National Marine Fisheries Service – and primarily conducts surveys of fish, marine mammals, and sea turtles off the United States West Coast and in the eastern tropical Pacific Ocean. Her commissioning in 2014 freed the NOAA fisheries survey vessel NOAAS Bell M. Shimada (R 227) from these duties, freeing Bell M. Shimada to focus on other high-priority projects – including studies of the California Current Large Marine Ecosystem and of salmon populations all along the U.S. West Coast – that prior to Reuben Lasker's arrival had been allocated no dedicated sea time.
