= Stable ocean hypothesis =

The stable ocean hypothesis (SOH) is one of several hypotheses within larval fish ecology that attempt to explain recruitment variability (Figure 1; Table 1). The SOH is the notion that favorable and somewhat stable physical and biological ocean conditions, such as the flow of currents and food availability, are important to the survival of young fish larvae and their future recruitment. In the presence of stable ocean conditions, concentrations of prey form in stratified ocean layers; more specifically, stable ocean conditions refer to “calm periods in upwelling ecosystems (sometimes called 'Lasker events')” that cause the water column to become vertically stratified. The concept is that these strata concentrate both fish larvae and plankton, which results an increase of the fish larvae feeding because of the density-dependent increase in predator-prey interactions. Lasker is attributed with constructing this hypothesis in the late 1970s by building on previous larval fish research and conducting his own experiments. He based the SOH on case studies of clupeid population fluctuations and larval experimentation.

Author	Year	Name	Summary	Comments
Hjort	1914	Critical period hypothesis	Larval survival pivots on whether or not a larval fish successfully feeds during the “critical period” when it transitions from relying on its yolk sac to exogenous food sources	Myopic view of larval starvation being the primary factor in larval recruitment variability
				Cites marine fisheries of northern Europe
	1926	Aberrant drift hypothesis	Larval recruitment is affected by winds and ocean currents which cause dispersal of eggs and larvae, removing them from essential larval and juvenile habitat	Provided the foundation for future larval recruitment paradigms, but was under-tested until recently, when both starvation and oceanographic movements have been recognized as important factors
				Also cites marine food fisheries of northern Europe, like cod
Cushing	1974; 1990	Match-mismatch hypothesis	Success of larval recruitment is linked to a temporal alignment of fish reproducing, larvae hatching, and plankton (prey) blooming (generally associated with spring)	An evolved hypothesis combining both of Hjort's founding concepts
				Cites Atlantic cod
Lasker	1978	Stable ocean hypothesis	When tranquil ocean conditions occur in upwelling systems, the water column becomes stratified in layers that concentrate larvae and plankton, which increases successful larval feeding, which increases larval recruitment and contributes to year class strength	Relevant to larval survival, but does not correlate strongly to variations in recruitment (Peterman and Bradford 1987)
				Cites northern anchovies in the Pacific
Cury and Roy et al.	1989; 1992	Optimal environmental window	In upwelling systems, wind, storm, and other energetic events cause turbulence that, within an optimal range, increase larval recruitment; dependent upon the presence/absences of Ekman transport	Builds upon Lasker's Stable Ocean hypothesis
		Hypothesis		Cites Peruvian anchoveta, Pacific sardines, and West African sardines
Iles and Sinclair	1982	Stable retention hypothesis	Prey availability is not as critical to recruitment as the physical retention of the larvae, so spawning events must coincide with suitable wind and current conditions	Adaptation of and forward progress on Hjort's aberrant drift hypothesis
				Cites Atlantic herring
Sale	1978; 1991	Lottery hypothesis	Variability in tropical fish recruitment is dependent on pre- and post-settlement dynamics	Contrasts Hjort's original perspectives
				Supported by modern research (Doherty, 2002; Cowen 2002)
				Cites tropical reef fish

== Case study evidence ==
To support this hypothesis, Reuben Lasker cited the disconnect between spawning stock biomass and the recruitment of numerous fish species. One explanation of this disconnect suggests larval recruitment is influenced by spatial and temporal patterns of their food, like phytoplankton or zooplankton, which can be greatly affected by ocean currents and mixing. In his publication Marine fish larvae: Morphology, ecology, and relation to fisheries (1981), he points out, for example, the Peruvian anchovy fishery collapse that resulted from a dramatic decrease in population size during the early 1970s. Officials and researchers from the Peruvian government and United Nations Food and Agriculture Organization submitted that the causal factors were a combination of strong fishing pressure and weak year classes that resulted in insufficient reproduction and recruitment to support the fishery. This explanation seemed to explain the diminished population trends of similar species from other regions, including the Pacific and Japanese sardines and the Atlanto-Scandian herring.

Lasker, however, opposed this conclusion while citing the seemingly miraculous recovery of the troubled Japanese sardine population from scarcity (e.g. thousands of landed tons) to prominent abundance (e.g. more than a million landed tons). Another researcher studying the rebound of the Japanese sardine, Kondo (1980), identified an unusually strong 1972-year class, which produced successful recruitments in the years that followed. Kondo also noted altered ocean current patterns that increased zooplankton availability in spatiotemporal coincidence with the hatching of the sardine larvae. The result was increased larval survival and the eventual rebound of the population. Thus, the observed trend is that strong year class anomalies can have major impacts on population sizes and their future stability and growth. This concept also illustrates how plankton abundance and ocean currents can be driving factors associated with such trends. Clearly, these patterns become important when considering the predictive models necessary to manage and sustain important fisheries and the stocks that support them.

== Experimental support ==
Lasker also conducted studies using first-feeding anchovy larvae (during their critical period or the nutritional source transition from yolk sac to external food sources in very young larvae) to further test and eventually support his ideas. During one at-sea experiment, Lasker introduced water derived from various oceanic layers containing natural assortments of plankton as prey for the young anchovy larvae.

He observed that anchovy larvae would first feed only when introduced to layers from below the surface containing high levels of chlorophyll and certain species of phytoplankton. These feeding-suitable phytoplankton assemblages were correlated with non-mixing thermocline layers. This conjecture was supported when foul weather swept up during the study and mixed the previously stratified layers (including a particulate layer below the surface) that had been sampled and introduced to the larvae. Samples derived from the same depths that proved ideal to induce first feeding prior to the storm no longer contained the necessary phytoplankton varieties and abundances; as a result, the young larvae did not feed on the post-storm samples and were unable to survive. Thus, Lasker eventually hypothesized that high-energy events that cause destratification of ocean layers have negative impacts on first-feeding northern anchovy larvae by destabilizing and decreasing their prey availability.

== Conditions and controversy ==
In the book Advances in Marine Biology, Heath (1992) astutely outlines some of the limitations and controversy associated with the SOH. Three major limiting conditions include, but are not limited to:

1. Species- and region-specific: SOH is based primarily on experimental studies of Pacific anchovy in the California current system (CCS) and should, therefore, be used cautiously when extrapolating to other species and regions.
2. Life-stage specific: Lasker's suggestion that storms ultimately have negative impacts on first-feeding anchovy larvae should come with the disclaimer that this applies only to first-feeding larvae entering the critical period. Older anchovy larvae can, in fact, be positively affected by storm activity, which often prompts increases in planktonic production.
3. Does not consider storm-absent survival of larvae: Admittedly, one study supported the SOH by documenting a correlation between increased daily mortality rates of first-feeding anchovy larvae and intervals of unperturbed, storm-absent conditions. Yet it is important to realize, as Peterman and Bradford did, that all this evidence does not affirm a certain relationship between larval survival and severe weather; this is particularly true given the lack of data regarding larval survival in the absence of storm events for context and comparison. Furthermore, Peterman and Bradford (1987) did not find a strong relationship between the larval survival rates documented adjacent to wind/storm events and recruitment levels observed months afterward.

== Conclusions and modern perspective ==
Lasker's SOH and the many other explanations of recruitment in larval variability are certainly relevant. However, current consensus is that larval recruitment and survival are, to some extent, dependent upon all of these processes and more; physical oceanography, prey, dispersal, and settlement/habitat are all very important factors, but predation, temperature, size, growth etc. are other key aspects affecting recruitment. Excellent research focusing on early life history and larval recruitment mechanisms was done from 1960–1990, and this body of research, including Lasker's, laid the basis for larval ecology studies today. Presently, researchers around the world continue to study larval recruitment processes, but they still refer to the founding concepts written many years ago.
