= J. Scott Turner =

American physiologist (born 1951)

- Born: 11 August 1951 (age 74)
- Known for: The theory of collective intelligence
- Scientific career
- Fields: Physiology
- Institutions: State University of New York at Syracuse (SUNY-ESF)

J. Scott Turner (born 11 August 1951) is an American physiologist who has contributed to the theory of collective intelligence through his fieldwork on the South African species of termite Macrotermes michaelseni, suggesting the architectural complexity and sophistication of their mounds as an instance of his theory of the extended organism or superorganism. His theory was reviewed in a range of journals, including Perspectives in Biology and Medicine, the New York Times Book Review, EMBO Reports, and American Scientist.

== Research ==
Working at the interface among physiology, evolution and design led Turner to formulate the idea of the Extended Organism, reviewed in a range of journals, including Nature. Turner's current research focuses on the emergence of super-organismal structure and function in mound-building termites of southern Africa (Macrotermes). His extended organism idea was inspired by his work on termite mounds that clarified how the mound functions as an external lung for respiratory gas exchange for the colony as a whole. His prior work on the thermal capacity of incubated birds' eggs showed that an egg with an embryo and an incubating parent function not as two separate organisms but as a coupled physiological unit.

Building upon this empirical work, Turner has argued that the principle of homeostasis is a fundamental property of living systems that accounts for, among other things, the phenomenon of biological design. With this argument, Turner counters both Intelligent Design and strong Darwinism, showing how natural selection is complemented by other factors. Turner proposes that modern evolutionary theory overemphasizes genetic natural selection and a tendency to separate information from catalysis at the molecular level. By connecting information and catalysis, epigenesis coupled with homeostasis exemplifies the internal, directive capacities of the organism, linking information and behavior. Turner has also suggested that termite mounds exemplify collective intelligence via a form of swarm cognition that is a model for the emergence of cognitive systems in a variety of contexts, including, but not limited to, self-contained nervous systems. The extended organism principle also justifies the Gaia Hypothesis and considers what we can translate from micro to macro, whether principles that govern termites offer a perspective on mind. He is an adviser to the Microbes Mind Forum and Professor of Biology at the State University of New York College of Environmental Science and Forestry (SUNY-ESF) in Syracuse, New York. Under a grant from the Templeton Foundation, he was a visiting scholar at Cambridge University while writing his third book, "Purpose and Desire", which builds the case that evolution operates through the complementary principles of Darwinian natural selection (biology's "First Law") coupled to homeostasis (biology's "Second Law").

== Publications ==
- Purpose and Desire: What Makes Something Alive and Why Modern Darwinism Has Failed to Explain It (2017)
- The Tinkerer's Accomplice: How Design Emerges from Life Itself (2007)
- The Extended Organism: The Physiology of Animal-Built Structures (2000)
