= David Bruce Dill =

American physiologist

- Born: 1891
- Died: 1986
- Known for: Exercise science and environmental physiology
- Scientific career
- Fields: Physiology
- Institutions: Harvard

David Bruce Dill (1891–1986) was an American physiologist specializing in exercise science and environmental physiology. He served as president of the American Physiological Society and was a founding director of Harvard's Fatigue Laboratory, where he remained as Director of Research until it closed in 1947.

== Work ==
Dill's early work focused on the analysis of crocodile blood. He moved into human research in 1927, when he was made founding director of the newly created Fatigue Laboratory at Harvard University.

=== Harvard Fatigue Laboratory studies ===
In 1933, Dill contributed to an HFL study of the oxygen debt mechanism, along with Rodolfo Margaria and Harold T. Edwards.

Under Dill, the Fatigue Laboratory conducted one of the most notable studies of the effects of aging on athletes. Among the test subjects was Don Lash, who in 1936 was the world record holder for the two-mile dash, with a time of 8 minutes, 58 seconds. Many of the other test subjects had stopped training after leaving university, but Lash had continued, and at age 49 was still running an average of 45 minutes a day. Lash's VO_{2} max declined 33% between ages 24 and 49, compared to an average of 43% for those runners who did not continue to train. The data suggested that early physical training does little to help with endurance capacity later unless the physical activity levels are maintained.

Dr. Dill's contributions were recognized by the National Academy of Kinesiology (formerly American Academy of Physical Education; American Academy of Kinesiology and Physical Education), which inducted him as an Associate Fellow in 1940.
