= Anitra Thorhaug =

American marine biologist, ecophysiologist

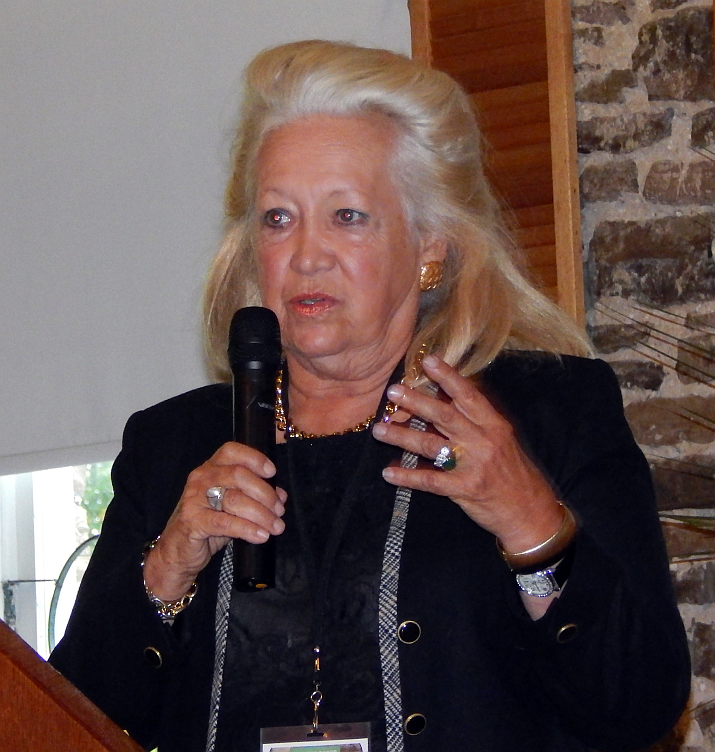
- Thorhaug at the Annual Club of Rome Conference 2013 in Ottawa, Canada
- Born: Chicago, Illinois
- Education: University of Miami
- Occupations: Marine biologist, ecophysiologist
- Known for: Seagrass rehabilitation, conservation and rehabilitation of coastal ecosystems
- Awards: UNEP Gold Medal (1982); UNEP Global Environmental Forum Global 500 (1987); Earth Trustee Award Medal (1991); Who's Who Women in Environment (2006)
- Scientific career
- Workplaces: American Botanical Society, Club of Rome, Yale, GCEEF, UN
- Thesis: Thermal Effects on Membrane Phenomena (1969)

Anitra Thorhaug is an American marine biologist, plant ecophysiologist and chemical oceanographer whose extensive work on the rehabilitation of coastal ecosystems has had a substantial influence on national and international policies on conservation around the world. She is president of the Greater Caribbean Energy and Environment Foundation working with the State of Texas on Coastal regeneration, and president of the Institute for Seagrasses. She has had a series of professorships at universities and presently works with the Center for Natural Carbon Capture at the Yale School of Forestry & Environmental Studies . She is a member of the International Club of Rome and has four times been president of the US Association for the Club of Rome.

== Education ==
Thorhaug studied biology at Smith College, the University of Chicago, Roosevelt University and the University of Oslo in Norway and was awarded a BSc by the University of Miami in 1963. She received an MSc in marine biology from the Rosenstiel School of Marine and Atmospheric Sciences at the University of Miami in 1965. She carried out research on artificial and living single-cell marine algae membranes at RSMAS and Hopkins Marine Station of Stanford University for which she was awarded a PhD in 1969. Her post-doctoral work (1969–1971) on living plasma membranes using a non-equilibrium thermodynamic framework included work at the Weizmann Institute with Aharon Katchalsky, and at UCLA with Jack Dainty, while continuing to be advised technically by Lawrence R. Blinks of Hopkins Marine Station.

== Career ==
Academically, Thorhaug has been associated with a number of universities and research institutions around the world, including the University of California, Berkeley, the Stanford Hopkins Marine Stations, Rosenstiel School of Marine and Atmospheric Sciences, Florida International University, the Weizmann Institute and UCLA and is conducting research into seagrass and mangrove Blue carbon comparative studies among tropical ocean basins at Yale Center for Natural Carbon Capture) (see references below), having ended a decade and a half of photosynthesis and remote sensing of marine plants at the Ecophysiological Laboratories at the Yale School of Forestry and Environmental Studies. She has worked for a number of United Nations Agencies including the World Bank and the Food and Agriculture Organization, the International Oceanographic Commission of the UN Educational, Scientific and Cultural Organization, the UN Environment Program and the UN Development Program. In the United States, she has worked for and advised the Department of Energy, National Oceanic and Atmospheric Administration, National Science Foundation, and Seagrant and has held offices in national scientific associations such as Chair of Physiology of the Botanical Society of America. Thorhaug has also worked with private foundations such as the Mobil Oil Foundation, Mitchell Foundation and the Rockefeller Family Foundation. She is the author of eleven books and more than four hundred scientific publications and presentations.

== Honors and awards ==
Thorhaug received the United Nations Environmental Program Gold Medal in 1982, was included in the UNEP Global 500 list in 1987, received the Earth Trustee Award from UNCED in 1991 and was featured in UNEP's Who's Who Women in Environment in 2006. She is a member of the Club of Rome and was president of the United States Association of the Club of Rome four times. She has received a Lifetime Legacy Award from the Botanical Society of America, a Lindbergh Award and a BSA Diamond Award as well as numerous national and international awards and grans and was awarded an honorary doctorate by the Philippines Women's University in 1994.

== References of recent publications ==
Thorhaug, Poulos, Lopez-Portillo et al. 2017. Seagrass blue carbon dynamics in the Gulf of Mexico: Stocks, losses from anthropogenic disturbance, and gains through seagrass restoration. Science of the Total Environment 605, 626–636. https://doi.org/10.1016/j.scitotenv.2017.06.189.

Thorhaug, AL, J Lopez-Portillo, HM Poulos, et al. 2019. Gulf of Mexico estuarine blue carbon stock, extent and flux: Mangroves, marshes, and seagrasses: A North American hotspot. Science of the Total Environment 653, 1253–1261. DOI:10.1016/j.scitotenv.2018.10.011

A Thorhaug, JB Gallagher, W Kiswara, A Prathep, X Huang, TK Yap, et. Al.2020.Coastal and estuarine blue carbon stocks in the greater Southeast Asia region: Seagrasses and mangroves per nation and sum of total .Marine Pollution Bulletin 160, 111168. doi: 10.1016/j.marpolbul.2020.111168

Gallagher J B, Chew S T and & Madin J, Thorhaug A. 2020. Valuing Carbon Stocks across a Tropical Lagoon (Borneo) after Accounting for Black and Inorganic Carbon: Bulk Density Proxies for monitoring. Journal of Coastal Research.36(5):1029-1039. DOI: 10.2112/JCOASTRES-D-19-00127.1
