= Anecdata.org =

Citizen science platform

- Website type: Citizen science web portal
- Available in: English, Vietnamese, German, Romanian, Polish, Spanish
- Owner: MDI Biological Laboratory
- Website: www.anecdata.org
- Commercial: No
- Current status: Online

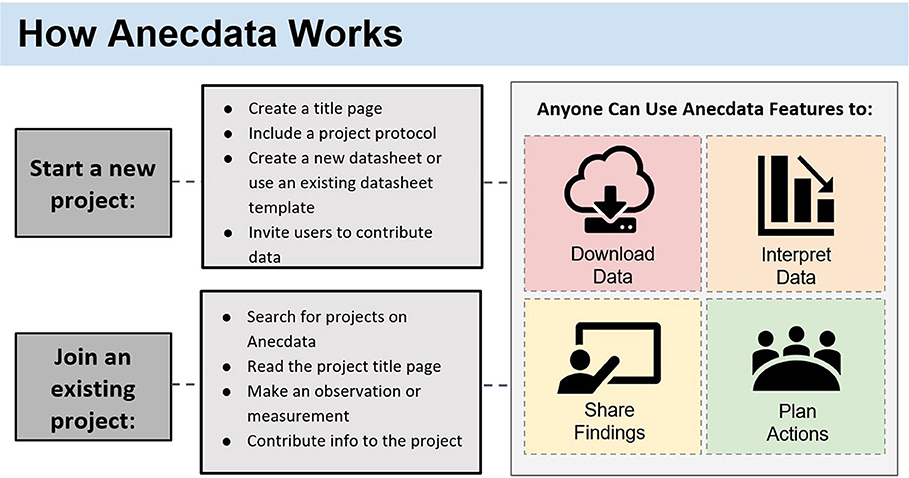
How Anecdata works

Anecdata.org (often shortened to Anecdata) is a citizen science web portal developed by the Community Environmental Health Lab at the MDI Biological Laboratory in Bar Harbor, Maine. Anecdata.org supports projects in the collection of observational data, primarily in environmental science, biology, and public health. Anecdata was founded in 2014 to provide a data management system for the citizen science projects run by the Community Environmental Health Lab and has since expanded to include more than 420 projects, where more than 22,000 registered users have contributed over 180,000 images and more than 200,000 observations. In addition to the desktop site, there is a corresponding mobile app that can be used to submit observations to existing projects. Anecdata.org also acts as a data repository where data can be stored, discovered, and shared to other users.

== Feature Set ==
Anecdata offers a configurable datasheet system in order to support a wide range of projects, allowing the project administrator to define all the questions they want to ask participants. Available data types include text, floating-point numbers and integers, boolean values, limited vocabulary picklists, taxon references, and the uploading of images, audio and video.

=== Social Features ===
Anecdata offers features more commonly available on social media platforms, including the ability to like and comment on observations, as well as participate in per-project online forums. Users can earn badges or achievements by reaching milestones defined by project administrators.

=== Translations ===
The platform includes a crowdsourced translation tool any logged-in user can use to review translations of user interface text and offer improved suggestions. Anecdata has been fully translated into French, Spanish, Polish, Ukrainian, and Vietnamese, with partial translations existing for other languages including Arabic, Romanian and simplified Chinese.

=== Data Privacy ===
Anecdata offers tools for protecting sensitive data from becoming public. These features include:

- Geoprivacy, or the obfuscation of the exact coordinates of an observation by adding or subtracting a random number from its publicly-visible coordinates.
- Private fields, which mark certain datasheet fields as sensitive. The values of these fields are be withheld from publicly-visible datasets and are only available to project administrators.
- Anonymous participation: Projects with an anonymous participation model will not display the observing user on the final observation.

=== Data Analysis ===
Any user on Anecdata can perform data analysis on live datasets using the integrated DataLab data analysis environment. DataLab offers data visualization using built-in analysis tools as well as integrated environments for R and Python. Built-in analyses include linear and stacked bar charts, point maps and heatmaps, bubble charts, and 2-dimensional matrix charts.

=== Pipelines ===
Project administrators can design pipelines, which are YAML-based workflows that are triggered by the creation and updating of observations. Pipeline actions can include data cleanup and data enrichment, such as geocoding and reverse geocoding, and the fetching of NOAA weather buoy data.

== Notable projects ==
=== Litter Journal ===
Litter Journal is a project from the South Carolina Aquarium hosted on Anecdata.org with a custom app, that encourages participants to track and remove plastics and other litter from both land and water. Since the start of the project in 2016, data from more than 7,000 litter cleanups have been entered into the project by more than 1,500 citizen scientists. In 2017, a total of 9,746 pieces of trash were logged and 2,333 total litter pieces in 2018. However, in 2019 the number of litter pieces recorded grew to 32,600 and in 2020, more than doubled, with 74,977 pieces of trash collected and logged. As of October 2026, the Litter Journal project has collected over 4,500,000 pieces of debris from the environment. The data from this project has inspired participant activism and has been used to influence public policy in South Carolina, including plastic bag bans.

=== Stream Tracker ===
The Stream Tracker project by Colorado State University works to improve the mapping of small, intermittent streams using crowdsourced observations. As of October 2026, the project has collected over 5,800 observations from 550 participants.

=== Smartphone Astrophotography ===
The Smartphone Astrophotography project was created by NASA educator Sten Odenwald to collect imagery of celestial objects using smartphones.

=== All About Arsenic ===
The All About Arsenic project engages middle and high school students across Maine and New Hampshire in the collection of household drinking water samples, which are then analyzed for contaminant elements including arsenic, uranium, and lead. To date over 5,300 water samples have been collected and processed, including over 1,000 samples that exceed 5ug/l of arsenic, the maximum level deemed safe by the New Hampshire Department of Environmental Services and over 600 that exceed 10ug/l, the maximum level according to the Environmental Protection Agency.

=== EarthWise Aware ===
The Boston organization EarthWise Aware administers some of the most active and prolific projects on Anecdata, including EwA Buggy (biodiversity), EwA Pheno Lite (phenology), EwA Trail Report (trail conditions), and EwA SGARs (Rat Poison) Brigade (combating environmental poisoning via rodenticides). Data from these projects are used to inform policymakers when creating legislation.

=== The Great Green Crab Hunt ===
The Great Green Crab Hunt project is a citizen science project led by the University of New Hampshire and the New Hampshire Sea Grant and hosted on Anecdata.org. The project aims to support scientists and policymakers in finding solutions to the problems caused by the invasive species, European green crabs. The project uses a mobile app and participants document the number, shell hardness, sex, and size of crabs seen during one hour. Since the project's inception in 2019, more than 100 observations documenting more than 400 crabs have been added to the project.
