= Hilda Emery Davis =

American composer and pianist (1895–1995)

- Born: 1 November 1895; Salisbury Cove, Bar Harbor, Maine, U.S.
- Died: 20 September 1995 (aged 99)
- Occupations: Composer; pianist
- Spouse: Meyer Davis
- Children: Garry Davis

Hilda Emery Davis (née Hodgkins; November 1, 1895 – September 20, 1995) was an American composer and pianist, mainly active in Philadelphia. She was also married to famous orchestra leader Meyer Davis and was the mother of World Citizen Garry Davis.

== Life ==
Hilda Hodgkins was born on November 1, 1895 in Salisbury Cove, an unincorporated village in Bar Harbor, Maine to Eugene Hodgkins and Bethia (known as Bertha) Emery. Hodgkins began learning the piano when she was five years old while living in Newburyport, Massachusetts. She also sang in her church choir, and often performed piano accompaniment for her older sister Doris (who later became concert contralto and wife of Pierre Monteux). According to Hodgkins, she barely graduated school due to a complete lack of interest; she primarily cared about music. She began taking lessons with a local pianist and composer, Charles P. Scott, who reportedly claimed that "Hilda's so talented, I won't charge her for lessons."

Hodgkins began her first professional job as a pianist when she was in her first year of high school at Cann's Sea Grill on Canal St. in Boston. Her pay was low, but she was able to perform on a balcony for the diners. She then took a job the Vaudeville and Movie Emporium in Newburyport, where she would improvise piano accompaniment for live performers. Hodgkins' big break came when she was hired by her maternal uncle as the pianist for the Star Theater in Bar Harbor, where she earned $20 a week to perform improvised accompaniment for silent films.

The young musician first met Meyer Davis in 1913 when Davis spent the summer performing with his orchestra at the Malvern Hotel. One day, Davis' pianist was unavailable for a concert that evening, so he was forced to ask Hodgkins, who charged him $25 an hour to perform. Davis, years later, told reporters "It was cheaper to marry her."

The couple courted for years, but Meyer's Jewish heritage gave Hodgkins pause, as she believed his family would not accept her. In the meantime, she moved to New York City to attempt an acting career, but inappropriate behavior from casting directors and a startling encounter with a "peeping tom" soured her on the idea. Hodgkins returned to Bar Harbor, and she and Davis were married in secret on June 10, 1917.

The couple settled in Philadelphia while Meyer's orchestras grew in popularity. Hilda converted to Judaism to appease Meyer's mother, and before long the couple welcomed their first child, Bobbie Virginia Davis, known as Ginny or later Ginia, on March 9, 1918. Hilda and Meyer had four other children, Meyer Davis Jr. in 1919, Sol Gareth "Garry" in 1921, Emery in 1923, and Marjorie Rose "Margie" in 1931.

The Davises maintained a close relationship with many leading orchestral conductors of the day, including Leopold Stokowski, who their children called "Stokey." In 1941, Hilda travelled with Pierre Monteux and his wife, Doris née Hodgkins, to Maine in the hopes that the Monteux estate would become a "musical mecca." There the composer taught music lessons and accompanied visiting performers such as tenor Andrew McKinley on the piano and the organ.

== Music ==
Although she is not as well known today, Davis was known as a "famous Philadelphia composer whose works have been played by the leading orchestras of the country..."

=== The Last Knight ===
Davis' composed a variety of pieces, ranging from songs to works for orchestra. Amongst her most successful works was a tone poem entitled The Last Knight, which was premiered by the NBC Symphony in 1938 with Monteux at the podium. Reviews were largely positive, with one critic stating, "Because of her extensive experience in orchestration, Mrs. Davis' tone poem is skillfully scored and sounds attractive in its tonal picturing of G.K. Chesterton's poem." The piece was also performed twice in 1940, once by the San Francisco Symphony, once again conducted by Monteux, and also by the Philadelphia Orchestra under the direction of Eugene Ormandy.

=== "You Are the Reason for My Love Song" ===
Another of Davis' most celebrated compositions was a song she composed for the widely publicized wedding of Franklin D. Roosevelt, Jr. to Ethel Du Pont. The song was performed for the very first time at the couples' wedding reception by Meyer Davis' orchestra and soloist William Horne. The lyrics were written by Sally Gibbs, daughter of Hamilton Gibbs, a novelist.
