= MDI Biological Laboratory =

US research laboratory

- Location within Maine
- Established: 1898
- Type: Non-profit and research institute
- Location(s): 159 Old Bar Harbor Road, Salisbury Cove; Bar Harbor, Maine
- Coordinates: 44°25′56″N 68°17′25″W
- Leader: Hermann Haller
- Website: www.mdibl.org

The MDI Biological Laboratory (MDIBL), formerly known as Mount Desert Island Biological Laboratory is an independent non-profit biomedical research institution founded in 1898 and located in Salisbury Cove, Maine, on Mount Desert Island. Its mission is to improve human health and well-being through basic research, education, and development ventures that transform discoveries into cures. In 2013, the laboratory was designated a Center for Biomedical Research Excellence (COBRE) by the National Institutes of Health, which awarded a grant of $13 million over five years to expand the institution's research program. The MDI Biological Laboratory has a full-time staff of 63, and will offer 23 research training courses in 2014.

== History ==
The MDI Biological Laboratory was originally founded as the Harpswell Lab in 1898 by a biology professor at Tufts University, John Sterling Kingsley. The laboratory was originally established as a teaching and research laboratory in South Harpswell, Maine, and focused on natural history, embryology, and comparative anatomy. Early investigators at the lab included Naohide Yatsu, Warren Harmon Lewis, and Margaret Reed Lewis. The MDI Biological Laboratory was incorporated in 1914 in Maine as a non-profit scientific and educational institution. In June 1921, the lab moved to its current home on Mount Desert Island, Maine, to land purchased by Wild Gardens of Acadia, a group of philanthropists led by George Dorr and John D. Rockefeller Jr. Upon moving to Mount Desert Island, the name was changed to Mount Desert Island Biological Laboratory, and subsequently shortened.

== Research ==
Scientists at the MDI Biological Laboratory are studying regeneration and aging. They are developing approaches for treating and preventing heart disease, stroke, diabetes, and cancer, as well as Alzheimer's, Parkinson's, and Huntington's diseases. They pick a model organism for each biological question, since our common evolutionary heritage means that humans share a major percentage of their genome with organisms that appear to be not related.

For example, MDI Biological Laboratory scientists study a tiny nematode, Caenorhabditis elegans, with a lifespan of two to three weeks, to study genes that regulate aging and lifespan. Those same genes are present in humans. They study organisms such as zebrafish and salamanders that are naturally able to regenerate diseased or damaged tissue, organs, and limbs using the same genetic mechanisms found in humans. However, for some reason, those mechanisms have been turned off in most mammals. The laboratory's scientists are learning how to reactivate these mechanisms to promote healing in humans.

In 2013, scientists at the MDI Biological Laboratory formed a spin-off company, Novo Biosciences, to explore the potential of MSI-1436, a naturally-occurring compound, to speed wound healing and tissue repair in mammals. This research was covered by Scientific American in an April 2019 feature article.

== Education and workforce training ==
Education is an important part of the MDI Biological Laboratory's mission. Students from middle school to medical school receive hands-on research training that prepares them for the 21st-century workforce. In 2014, the laboratory offered 25 one- or two-week-long courses for Maine undergraduates, medical students, and scientific professionals. Academic year and summer fellowships are offered for high school and undergraduate students. These fellowships provide an extended opportunity for students to work directly with an MDI Biological Laboratory scientist and gain real-world research experience.

The MDI Biological Laboratory leads the Maine INBRE or IDeA Network for Biomedical Research Excellence, a collaborative network of three Maine research institutions and ten Maine colleges that is strengthening Maine's capacity to conduct competitive biomedical research. Since its founding in 2001, the INBRE program has brought more than $68 million into Maine in federal grants for the research and education programs it supports, as well as an additional $38 million in federal funding for research initiated under the INBRE grant. Half of all INBRE funds are distributed across Maine among INBRE partner institutions to support student research training and junior faculty. The program has trained more than 2,000 Maine students in state-of-the-art research methods. Over 90% of INBRE graduates pursue careers or advanced education in scientific or medical fields.

The 13 institutions participating in the Maine INBRE are the MDI Biological Laboratory as lead institution, The Jackson Laboratory, Bowdoin, Bates, and Colby Colleges, College of the Atlantic, the University of Maine, the University of Maine Honors College, and the University of Maine at Farmington, Fort Kent, Machias, and Presque Isle, and Southern Maine Community College. In 2021, the MDI Biological Laboratory was awarded a grant under the INBRE program to introduce undergraduate students throughout Maine to cloud computing.

IDeA and INBRE are programs administered and funded by the National Institutes of Health.

== Public and environmental programs ==
Programs at the MDI Biological Laboratory help break down the barriers that often exist between science and the public. The Laboratory offers the MDI Science Cafés, Anecdata.org, Family Science Night, Art Meets Science program, and the Community Environmental Health Laboratory (CEHL).

The Community Environmental Health Laboratory (CEHL) works to identify, locate, and remedy threats to public health and the clean waters on and around Mount Desert Island by putting science in the hands of community volunteers, students, and teachers. Every CEHL project relies on volunteer efforts from students and community members, and involves community education. Current projects at CEHL include the study and restoration of eelgrass beds in Frenchman Bay, eelgrass-based education and outreach in middle and high schools, swim beach water quality monitoring, and phytoplankton monitoring.

CEHL's director, Jane Disney, is the recipient of the SeaWorld Busch Gardens Environmental Excellence Award (1998), the Governor's Award for Environmental Excellence (2000), and the Gulf of Maine Council Visionary Award (2007). She has been instrumental in the forming of the Frenchman Bay Partners, a broad-based stakeholder group committed to a sustainable future for Frenchman Bay.

== Human and environmental sustainability summits ==
The MDI Biological Laboratory launched the Human and Environmental Sustainability Summits in 2013 as part of its focus on improving human and environmental health and on using science to solve real world problems. The summits bring together a diverse group of stakeholders to develop actionable solutions to critical problems in environmental and public health. In 2014, forty scientists, engineers, health officials, consumer advocates, food industry representatives, and educators addressed the global problem of arsenic in food and drinking water.

== Research misconduct ==
On August 2, 2021, former Associate Professor Viravuth "Voot" Yin entered into an agreement with the Office of Research Integrity (ORI) specifying that his research would be supervised for a period of two years. This agreement was the culmination of an investigation by ORI and MDIBL into research misconduct perpetrated by Yin, which found inclusion of falsified and fabricated data in three published manuscripts and two manuscripts then under review. Yin neither admitted nor denied the charges leveled against him.

== Notable researchers ==
- John Sterling Kingsley
- Naohide Yatsu
- Warren Harmon Lewis
- Margaret Reed Lewis
- William Harder Cole
- Bodil Schmidt-Nielsen
