= Kevin Strange =

Kevin Strange is an American medical researcher who is the former president and first full-time director of the MDI Biological Laboratory. He took the role in July 2009, after working as an NIH-funded biomedical scientist and academic leader at Harvard Medical School and Vanderbilt University School of Medicine. As President, Strange worked towards refocusing the MDI Biological Laboratory's research program and recruiting multidisciplinary scientists to understand the genetic mechanisms of tissue repair, regeneration, and aging. In 2013, three years after establishing this new research focus, the MDI Biological Laboratory was recognized by the National Institutes of Health as a center of research excellence in regenerative and aging biology and medicine.

Strange was an associate professor at Harvard Medical School and director of the critical care research laboratories at Children's Hospital in Boston. In 1997, he moved to Vanderbilt University School of Medicine, where he was the John C. Parker Professor and director of research in the department of anesthesiology.

Strange is an expert in the field of cellular stress biology. His research focuses on how proteins are damaged by environmental stressors, how cells detect, degrade, and repair these damaged proteins and how cells protect themselves from osmotic stress. This work furthers the understanding of degenerative changes that occur as humans age. Strange has published over 125 original papers, review articles, and books. His laboratory has been funded continuously by the NIH and private foundations for over 30 years. He holds bachelor's and master's degrees from the University of California, Davis and received his doctorate from the University of British Columbia.

In 2013, Strange founded the MDI Biological Laboratory's first spinout company, Revidia Therapeutics, Inc., to accelerate the testing and development of a novel drug candidate for patients with heart disease. That year, the magazine Mainebiz named Strange one of Maine's ten most “innovative business people” who “hold tremendous promise for the state” and its future economy.

Strange stepped down as president of MDI Biological Laboratory at the end of his second term in 2018 to focus his efforts on growing Revidia Therapeutics and advancing their drug candidate into clinical trials. Strange is currently principal scientist at Revidia Therapeutics and Professor of Anesthesiology at Vanderbilt University School of Medicine.
