= John Sterling Kingsley =

American professor of biology and zoology

- Born: 7 April 1854; Cincinnatus, New York, United States
- Died: 29 August 1929 (aged 75); Pacific Ocean
- Burial place: Burial at sea (34°27′N 156°54′E)
- Spouse: Mary Emma Read (m. 1882)
- Scientific career
- Fields: Zoology

John Sterling Kingsley (7 April 1854 – 29 August 1929) was an American professor of biology and zoology.

== Early life ==
John Kingsley was born on 7 April 1854 in the town of Cincinnatus in Central New York, the son of Julia A. (née Kingman) Lewis Kingsley. His father, who was then County Judge and Surrogate, moved to Norwich in 1856 where Kingsley was raised and received his early education at private schools. From his earliest years, he took a keen interest in science, especially chemistry.

After attending schools in Norwich, Connecticut, and Cincinnatus he decided to become an engineer. He refused an appointment to the United States Naval Academy in Annapolis and chose instead to attend Brooklyn Polytechnic Institute. The death of his father forced him to leave the Institute before earning his degree. The engineering training he did receive though enabled him to earn enough money to resume his education in 1873 with the junior class at Williams College. It was around this time that he took a side interest in medicine, devoting much of his spare time to the subject when not engaged in his normal classwork.

His connection with the Natural History Society of the college, however, caused him to decide upon biology as his life study; and upon his graduation in 1875 enrolled at the Peabody Academy of Science at Salem, Massachusetts, where he studied with Alpheus Spring Packard. Here his work was entirely in the line of systematic zoology, especially on crustaceans, that he published several papers on.

== Career ==
In 1878, Kingsley moved to Providence, Rhode Island, to work as an assistant on the newly formed United States Entomological Commission. The following year he attended the Philadelphia Academy of Natural Science, where he studied general morphology. During this time he supported himself by drawing scientific illustrations and writing articles for various scientific journals. Kingsley then attended Princeton University, receiving his Doctorate of Science in 1885. In 1887 he was named Professor of Zoology at the University of Indiana and two years later accepted the chair of Biology at the University of Nebraska. He resigned in 1891 to take a year off to study in Europe, primarily at the University of Freiburg under Dr. Robert Wiedersheim. Upon his return in 1892, Kingsley was offered the chair of Biology at Tufts College where he would write nearly all the biological articles for Johnson's Universal Cyclopaedia. From 1913 to 1921, Kingsley served as a professor of zoology at the University of Illinois. In 1898, he founded MDI Biological Laboratory

Throughout his career, Kingsley would author over 300 scientific articles and numerous books on such subjects as vertebrae zoology, comparative zoology, and the anatomy of vertebrates. In 1902, he translated German zoologist Richard Hertwig’s ein Handbuch der Zoologie. Kingsley was a one-time editor of the publications Standard Natural History (1884), and The American Naturalist (1886–96). He had served over the years as president of the Nebraska Academy of Sciences at Lincoln, and the American Morphological Society at Johns Hopkins University, and held memberships in several other scientific organizations both nationally and internationally.

== Marriage ==
John Kinsgley married Mary Emma Read of Salem, Massachusetts on 31 January 1882. She was the daughter of a Salem produce dealer who, several years after her birth, served in the American Civil War. Kingsley's only child, Mary Winship, was born in 1883 at Melrose, Massachusetts.

== Death ==
John Sterling Kingsley died of a heart attack on 29 August 1929 while traveling with his daughter aboard the S.S. President Taft. At the time of his death, the ship was some three days away from docking at Yokohama, Japan, and the decision was made to commit his remains to the sea.

== Works ==
- The Riverside Natural History, Volume 5 (1888)
