= Knut Schmidt-Nielsen =

Comparative physiologist

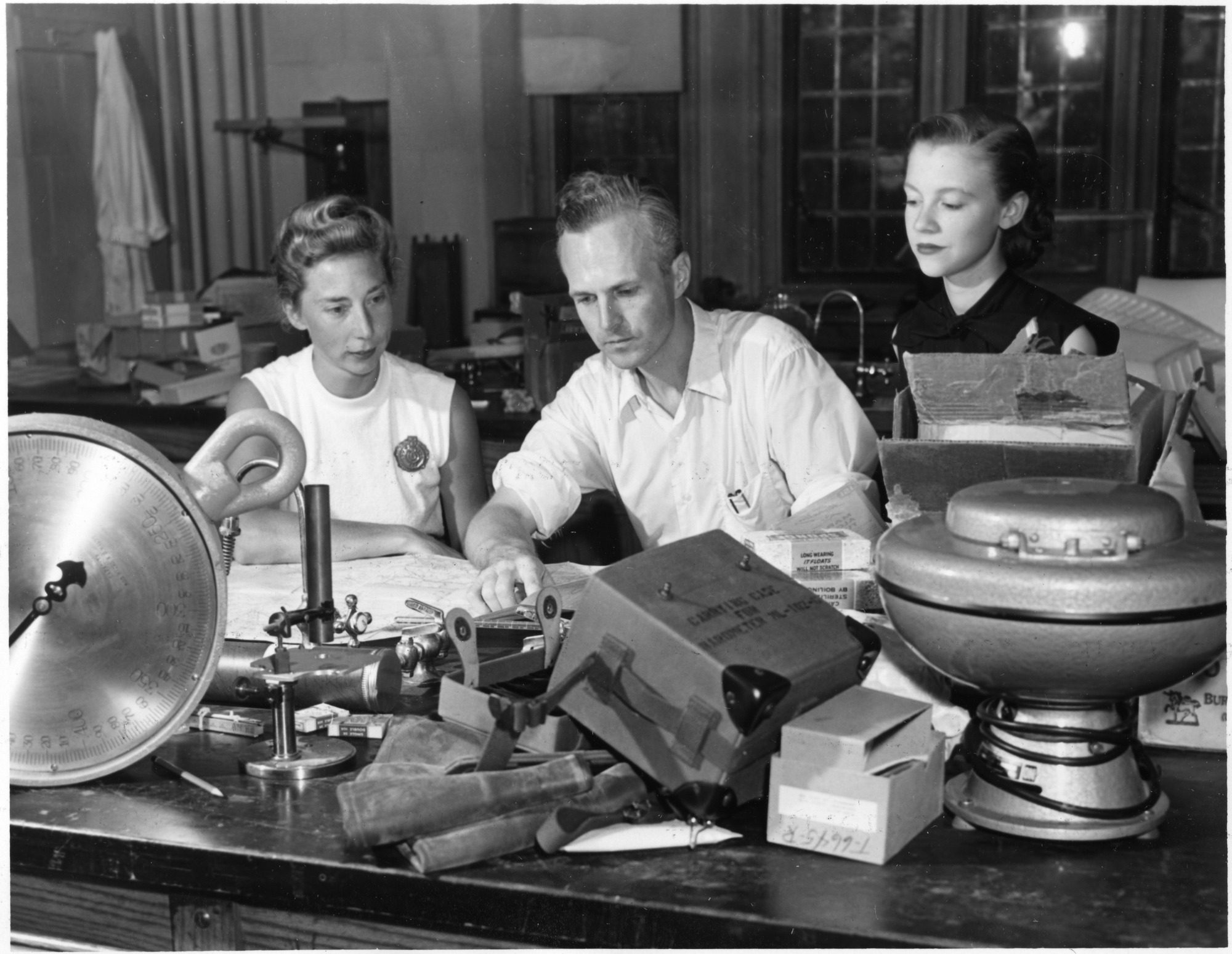
- Bodil Mimi Krogh Schmidt-Nielsen, Knut Schmidt-Nielsen, and Barbara Wagner
- Born: September 24, 1915; Trondheim, Norway
- Died: January 25, 2007 (aged 91)
- Education: Swarthmore College, Stanford University, University of Cincinnati
- Known for: Contributions to ecophysiology
- Spouse: Bodil Schmidt-Nielsen (divorced) Margareta Claesson (m. 1977–his death)
- Awards: International Prize for Biology (1992)
- Scientific career
- Fields: Physiology
- Institutions: Duke University

Knut Schmidt-Nielsen (September 24, 1915 – January 25, 2007) was a comparative physiologist and Professor of Physiology Emeritus at Duke University.

== Background ==
Schmidt-Nielsen was born in Trondheim, Norway. His parents were the scientists Sigval Schmidt-Nielsen [no, sv] and Signe Torborg Schmidt-Nielsen. Schmidt-Nielsen was educated in Oslo and Copenhagen. He became a student in the laboratory of August Krogh in Copenhagen in 1937. Schmidt-Nielsen moved to the United States, where he studied at Swarthmore College, Stanford University, and the University of Cincinnati College of Medicine. He was the leader of expeditions to the Sahara Desert in 1953–54 and central Australia in 1962. He has been a Guggenheim Fellow, a Trustee of Mt. Desert Island Biological Laboratory, and a consultant to the National Science Foundation.

== Career ==
Schmidt-Nielsen published over 275 scientific papers and wrote the authoritative text on animal physiology. Schmidt-Nielsen is widely recognized as having made significant contributions to ecophysiology. He has been referred to as "the father of comparative physiology and integrative biology" and "one of the all-time greats of animal physiology". He came to Duke University in 1952 and became a James B. Duke Professor in the Department of Biology.

In 1980, Knut Schmidt-Nielsen was elected President of the International Union of Physiological Sciences. He was the founding editor of News in Physiological Sciences. He was a member of the Royal Norwegian Society of Sciences and Letters (1973), the Norwegian Academy of Science and Letters (1979), the Royal Society of London, the French Academy of Sciences and the United States National Academy of Sciences. Next to the Biological Science building on Duke's campus is a statue of Schmidt-Nielsen looking at a camel, honoring his more than twenty years of work studying and dispelling myths on how camels withstand the harsh desert environment.

He was recipient of the 1992 International Prize for Biology awarded by the Japan Society for the Promotion of Science.

== Books ==
- 1972 How Animals Work Cambridge: Cambridge University Press. ISBN 978-0-521-09692-8
- 1975 Animal Physiology: Adaptation and Environment Cambridge & New York: Cambridge University Press. ISBN 0-521-20551-4
- 1979 Desert animals: Physiological problems of heat and water Dover Publications. ISBN 978-0-486-23850-0
- 1984 Scaling: Why Is Animal Size So Important? Cambridge & New York: Cambridge University Press ISBN 0-521-31987-0
- 1998 The Camel's Nose: Memoirs Of A Curious Scientist Washington, D.C: Island Press. ISBN 978-1-55963-512-7
