= Antoni Wyche =

American former basketball player and coach

Delaware Fightin' Blue Hens
- Title: Assistant coach
- League: C-USA

Personal information
- Born: September 20, 1977 (age 49) New York, U.S.
- Listed height: 6 ft 5 in (1.96 m)
- Listed weight: 193 lb (88 kg)

Career information
- High school: Ballston Spa High School, Bishop Gibbons
- College: Notre Dame (1995–1999)
- NBA draft: 1999: undrafted
- Playing career: 2000–2009
- Position: Guard
- Coaching career: 2009–present

Career history

Playing
- 2000: New Jersey Shorecats
- 2000–2001: Rabotnički
- 2002: Adirondack Wildcats
- 2002–2003: Kouvot
- 2003: Adirondack Wildcats
- 2005–2007: Niigata Albirex BB
- 2007–2008: Al Rayan
- 2008: Zain Club
- 2009: Orange County Gladiators

Coaching
- 2009–2019: Lehigh (assistant)
- 2019–2021: Siena (assistant)
- 2021–2023: Notre Dame (assistant)
- 2023–2024: Siena (assistant)
- 2024–2025: Northern Illinois (assistant)
- 2025–present: Delaware (assistant)

Antoni Wyche (born September 20, 1977) is an American former professional basketball player who last played for Orange County Gladiators and current assistant coach for the Delaware Fightin' Blue Hens men's basketball team. He was a four-year letterwinner under Notre Dame head coach John MacLeod from 1995 to 1999 and served as a team captain during his senior year 1998–1999 during which he averaged 11.3 points and 2.5 rebounds while starting all 30 games.

He was previously an assistant coach for the Northern Illinois Huskies.
