= Margaret Reed Lewis =

American cell biologist (1881–1970)

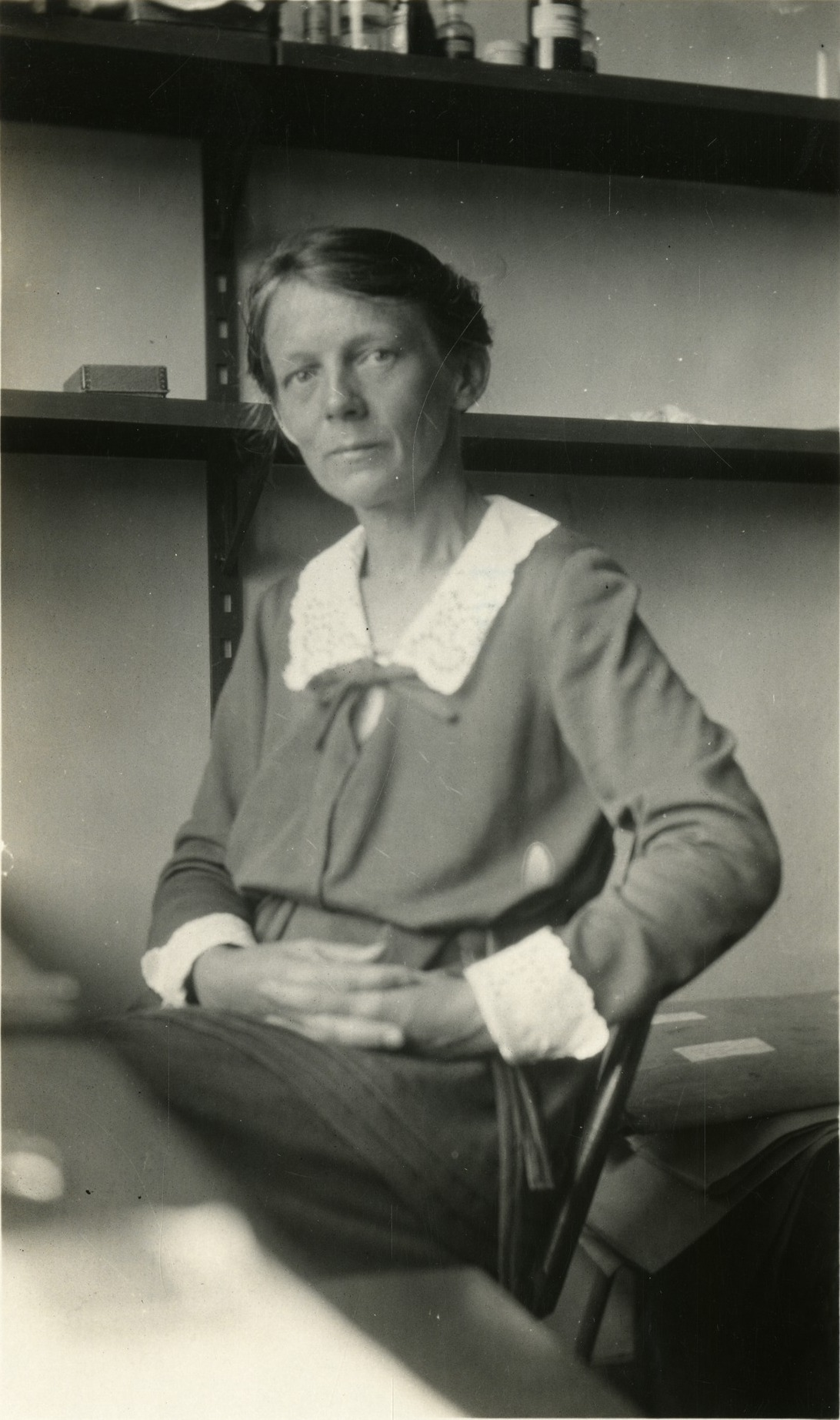
- Lewis, c. 1936
- Born: November 9, 1881; Kittanning, Pennsylvania, U.S.
- Died: July 20, 1970 (aged 88); Pittsburgh, Pennsylvania, U.S.
- Education: Goucher College
- Spouse: Warren Harmon Lewis (m. 1910; died 1964)
- Scientific career
- Fields: Cell biology, embryology

Margaret Adaline Reed Lewis (November 9, 1881 – July 20, 1970) was an American cell biologist and embryologist who made contributions to cancer research and cell culture techniques, and was likely the first person to successfully grow mammalian tissue in vitro. She authored around 150 papers, many co-authored with her husband Warren Harmon Lewis. The Lewises developed a growth medium called the Locke–Lewis solution and jointly received the Gerhard Gold Medal from the Pathological Society of Philadelphia.

== Early life and education ==
Margaret Adaline Reed was born in Kittanning, Pennsylvania, on November 9, 1881, to Martha A. (née Walker) and Joseph Cable Reed. Her early life was "uneventful" according to her but she remembered the flooding of Conemaugh River in May 1889, when she accompanied her father to rescue stranded people using a boat. The family later moved to Meyersdale. An episode of scarlet fever damaged her hearing. She had an interest in medicine from a young age. Her parents sent her older sister Jessica and her to a finishing school, Hannah More Academy in 1894, but they were unhappy and were then sent to the Girl's Latin School of Baltimore. From 1897 to 1901 she attended Goucher College (then known as Woman's College of Baltimore), where she earned an A. B. in mathematics. She was a member of the Alpha chapter of the Tau Kappa Pi Fraternity. After graduation, she studied at Bryn Mawr College, Columbia University, and the Universities of Zurich, Paris, and Berlin, but never earned a graduate degree. At Bryn Mawr and Columbia, she researched regeneration in amphibians and crayfish, with summer visits to the Marine Biological Laboratory at Woodshole where she assisted the noted American embryologist Thomas Hunt Morgan.

In 1903, she became a lecturer at the New York Medical College for Women and, in 1905, she moved to lecture at Barnard College. In 1906, she traveled to Europe and worked at the University of Zurich. She also visited Berlin and Paris.

== Career ==
=== Mammalian in vitro culture ===
In 1908, Margaret Reed researched in Berlin in Max Hartmann's lab where she performed probably the first in vitro mammalian cell culture with guinea pig bone marrow by explanting the bone marrow and placing it into a nutrient-rich agar produced by fellow lab researcher Rhoda Erdmann and incubating the sample. A few days after doing so, she found that some of the nuclei exhibited characteristics of mitosis. This discovery was revisited by Margaret Reed after she married Warren Harmon Lewis in 1910. In their combined efforts, the Lewises found that cell proliferation with their media selection and methods seemed only to occur in tissues common to all organs, such as connective tissue and blood vessel endothelium. Since the Lewises main interest was microscopic cell structures, their objective was to create optically-clear media, which led to the creation of the Locke–Lewis solution. This medium is composed of salt solutions supplemented with bouillon and dextrose. The tissue grown in this medium was prepared in a method that became known as the "Lewis culture" where the tissue bits were put into a hanging drop on the underside of a thin glass slip. In the Locke–Lewis solution, the more robust cells, such as fibroblasts and macrophages, had a tendency to migrate out of the explant and flatten, making them easy to observe under high magnifications.

=== Cell biology ===
Lewis was among the first scientists to observe the dynamics of mitochondria in living cells. In 1915, Margaret and Warren Lewis published a comprehensive analysis of the shapes and movements of mitochondria in cultured cells. Lewis's pioneering time-lapse studies included observations of mitochondrial movement toward and away from the centrosome, mitochondrial fission, and mitochondrial fusion. In the same paper, Lewis presented perhaps the first descriptions of stress-induced mitochondrial fragmentation and mitophagy.

=== Embryology ===
Lewis and her husband helped develop and put into practice the first experimental systems for observing and understanding somatic cell physiology in complex organisms, which demonstrated that the behavior of these autonomous cells had a significant relationship to the development, infection, immunity, physiology and development of cancer for the organism. As a result, their work served to establish the importance of cellular behavior. As a result, this couple's greatest impact on embryology and cell biology in the twentieth century was teaching later generations of biologists the basic factors involved in tissue culture based on what they had learned from their research. The Lewises saw a place for the findings on the cell related to embryology as well, and expressed this perspective to the president of the Carnegie Institution of Washington when they wrote to him that knowing the extent of a cell's permanent individuality must be determined before it is possible to understand how they cooperate and are integrated into a tissue. This perspective is what gave Margaret and Warren Lewis their place in the Department of Embryology at the Carnegie Institution. With so many avenues opened by cell culture to explore, Margaret Lewis and her husband diverged in their area of study, with Margaret Lewis choosing to focus on microbiological problems, which involved close observations of chick embryo intestines reacting to typhoid bacilli in the medium in which it was grown. Through the tissue culture techniques the Lewises had developed, these studies showed that infections and diseases were cellular phenomena in that infection was observed in an isolated system but the events occurred in a way that would be observed in an organism as a whole.

In her work with chick embryos, Margaret Lewis studied connective tissue formation within the tissues as well as outside of an environment where factors involved in coagulation are present. Lewis observed that the connective tissue fibrils resulted from the cytoplasmic transformations of the cells. In her studies of explanted tissue cultures, Lewis noted that the cells choose to migrate away from the tissue sample and divide as individual cells, resulting in loss of the tissue's characteristic appearance. However, she also made the distinction that the cells do not become more embryonic like Champy and others claimed, but instead lose their differentiated appearance as a tissue. This spreading of the cells and lack of characteristic tissue form caused fibril development in many tissue cultures to be lacking; however, there were a few cultures where connective tissue fibers did develop, and their progression could be tracked. She observed that fibrils start as delicate lines in the exoplasm and become bundles that are passed between cells. Lewis also found no evidence of vacuoles forming fibrils as was believed to be the case by other researchers.

=== Cancer ===
In 1951, Lewis isolated a spontaneous epidermoid carcinoma in a mouse lung, which became known as a Lewis lung carcinoma. This carcinoma was one of the earliest tumors that could be transplanted and used to determine if a compound had potential as an anticancer agent. It has played a significant role in more recent tumor models used in metastatic and angiogenesis studies as it is a highly-malignant carcinoma, producing tumors when it was transplanted and increasing metastatic growth after the subcutaneously-implanted carcinoma is removed. Some of Margaret Reed Lewis's research in the mechanics of cancer included myeloid infiltration and strangulation-induced atrophy of tumors in rats. In her study on myeloid infiltration, Lewis found that this phenomenon occurred in the adrenals but was not common to all subjects tested with tumors. However, tumor growth seemed to be associated with the progression of neutrophilia in peripheral blood and myeloid hyperplasia in certain organs. In the tumor atrophy paper, Margaret Lewis showed that tumor tissue inactivated in environments devoid of sufficient circulation and continued to stay in this arrested state when transplanted to other rats. This led to absorption and resistance to viable tumor implantation.

=== Teaching ===
Between 1901 and 1912, Lewis held several teaching positions. She was an assistant in zoology at Bryn Mawr College (1901–1902); a science teacher at Miss Chapin's School, lecturer in physiology at New York Medical College for Women (1904–1907); lecturer at Barnard College (1907–1909), and instructor of anatomy and physiology at the Johns Hopkins Hospital Training School for Nurses (1911–1912).

== Marriage ==
In 1910, she married Warren Harmon Lewis, also a cell physiologist. The Lewises collaborated on many research projects over the years, including the discovery that macrophage cells derived from monocytes and were not separate cell types. Whether working on an independent or collaborative project, the couple worked alongside each other in lab and consulted with each other on their findings. Their children were Margaret Nast Lewis, who became a physicist; Warren R. Lewis, who worked as an engineer and atomic physicist; and Jessica H. Lewis, who was an associate research professor.

== Later life and death ==
As a female scientist, Margaret Reed Lewis was not able to push her own achievements in her field of work, but she with her husband was able to further develop tissue culturing techniques and demonstrate how single cells impacted the organism as a whole. In 1915 Lewis joined the Carnegie Institution of Washington. In 1940 she was elected to the Wistar Institute in Philadelphia, and was an honorary life member of the Tissue Culture Society. Lewis with her husband was awarded a William Wood Gerhard Gold Medal by the Pathological Society of Philadelphia in 1958 because of their contributions to pathology. Lewis died on July 20, 1970, at the age of 88.

== Legacy ==
Margaret Reed Lewis is known for her contributions to the development of cell biology and tissue culture techniques in the early twentieth century. Her work contributed to a better understanding of the role of individual cells within the organism. However, her research was long associated with that of her husband, Warren Harmon Lewis, and her individual contributions often remained unseen.

The tissue culture methods to which Lewis contributed became fundamental tools in modern biological and medical research. These techniques made it possible to study cells in controlled laboratory environments.

Today, Lewis’s work is increasingly reexamined in the context of the history of science, particularly in efforts to highlight the contributions of women scientists.
