= Marie Krogh =

Danish physician, physiologist and nutritionist

Birte Marie Krogh
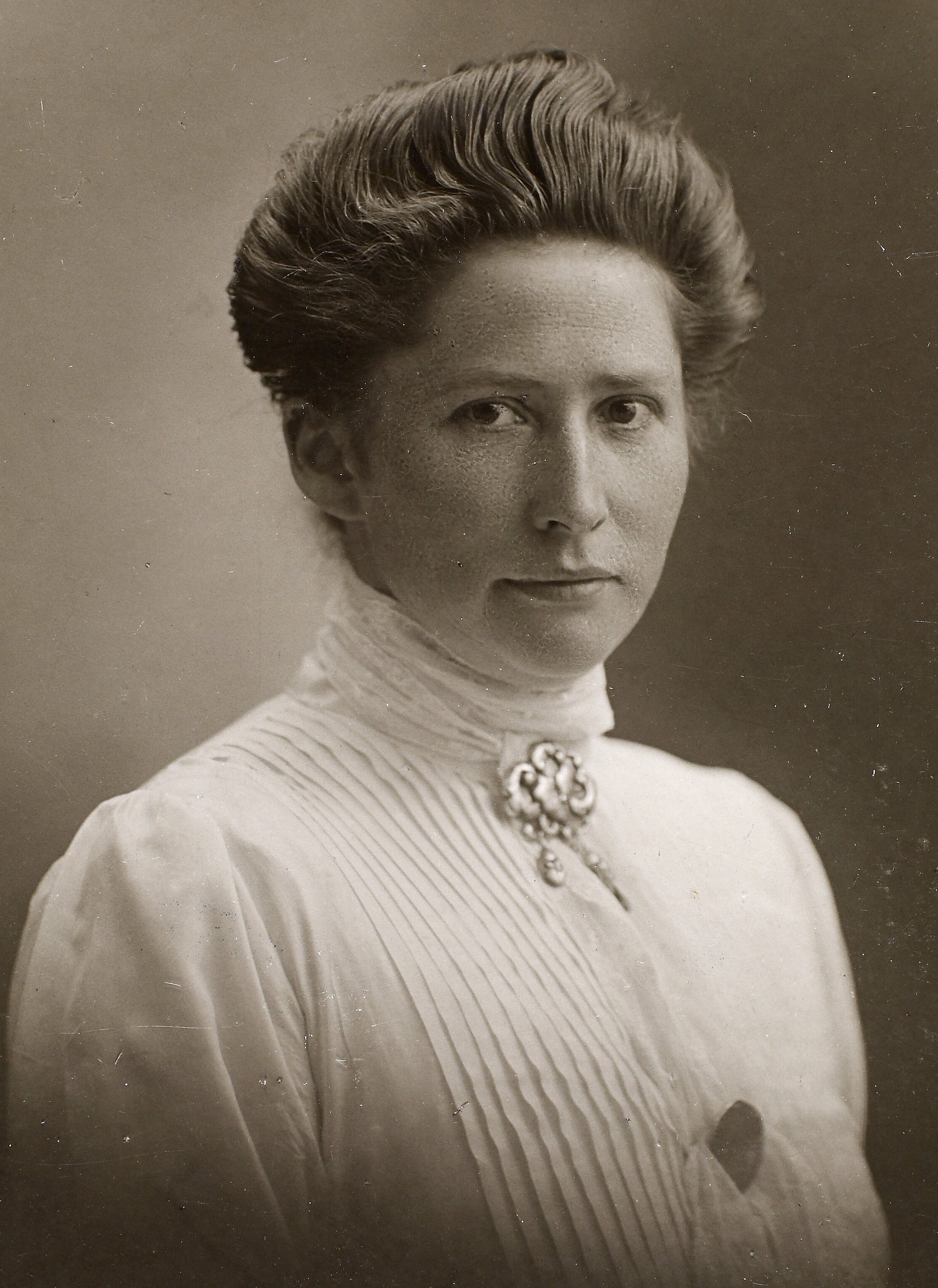
- Born: 25 December 1874; Vosegaard, Denmark
- Died: 25 March 1943 (aged 68)
- Education: University of Copenhagen (M.D.); Dr. med.
- Spouse: August Krogh (m. 1905)
- Children: Bodil Schmidt-Nielsen
- Scientific career
- Fields: Physiology, nutrition
- Workplaces: University of Copenhagen

Marie Krogh, née Jørgensen (25 December 1874 – 25 March 1943), was a Danish physician, physiologist and nutritionist.

== Life and work ==
Birte Marie Krogh was born on 25 December 1874 in Vosegaard, Denmark, one of only four of nine children in her family to survive to adulthood. Due to family pressure, she was not able to attend a university-preparatory school until 1898, graduating three years later. While attending the University of Copenhagen, she met and married (1904) August Krogh, who, in 1920, won the Nobel Prize in Physiology or Medicine, in a physiology class. After Krogh graduated with her medical degree in 1907, the couple began their life-long collaboration with an expedition to Greenland to measure respiration and gas exchange in the Greenlandic Inuit, who like other Inuit throughout the Arctic, had a diet that consisted almost exclusively of meat.

Krogh prematurely delivered a pair of sons in October 1908, but only one survived. Over the next two years, the couple used themselves as experimental subjects studying gas diffusion in the lungs. In 1910, Marie began a medical practice to supplement their inadequate academic income. Over the next eight years, she had four more children, of whom one son was stillborn. Their youngest daughter, Bodil Schmidt-Nielsen, later became an eminent physiologist in her own right. Marie earned her Doctor Medicinae from the University of Copenhagen in 1914, only the fourth woman in Denmark to receive an advanced medical degree.

After she developed diabetes in the early 1920s, the couple began researching insulin production and developed a profitable technique that allowed them to start a pharmaceutical company that spent its profits on physiological and endocrinological research. This company (Novo Nordisk), was one of the most valuable pharmaceutical companies, valued at $439 billion in 2023. Krogh developed breast cancer in the early 1940s and died on 25 March 1943.
