= William Harder Cole =

American biologist and science educator

- Born: William Harder Cole; June 23, 1892; Cayuga, New York, U.S.
- Died: February 6, 1967 (aged 74)
- Education: Hamilton College (BS); Harvard University (MA), (PhD)
- Known for: Science Education; Zoology; Biology
- Scientific career
- Fields: Biology
- Institutions: Pennsylvania State University; Harvard University; Lake Forest College; Clark University; Rutgers University; MDI Biological Laboratory; Woods Hole Oceanographic Institution; Bermuda Institute of Ocean Sciences; Pacific Grove Museum of Natural History; Cold Spring Harbor Laboratory; California Institute of Technology; Columbia University

William Harder Cole (June 23, 1892 – February 6, 1967) was an American biologist, science educator, and zoologist. Cole's research work focused on skin grafting, animal behavior, protein metabolism, and invertebrate blood. Cole was known for his administrative skills, and supported a number of scientific institutions as trustee or director including MDI Biological Laboratory and Cold Spring Harbor Laboratory.

== Early life and education ==
William Harder Cole was born June 23, 1892, in Cayuga, New York. Cole completed high school at Ballston Spa High School in 1910 and completed his B.A. at Hamilton College in 1914. Cole then spent 1914 studying at University of Bonn. He then began graduate work at Harvard University and an M.A. in 1916 and a Ph.D. in 1921 where he was mentored by George Howard Parker. Between his MA and Ph.D., he served in the United States Army from 1917 to 1919, as a Sergeant first class, in the Sanitary Corps where he helped develop a typhoid vaccine. He married Florence Augusta Hanagan in 1918 with whom he had no children. Cole loved to sail, and spent much time on Mount Desert Island, Maine with his sailboat.

== Career ==
William Harder Cole held a series of instructor and professor positions following his Ph.D. From 1916 to 1920, Cole served as an instructor of zoology at Penn State University. The following year, he was an Austin Teaching Fellow at Harvard from 1920 to 1921. He was a professor of biology at Lake Forest College from 1921 to 1924 and at Clark University from 1924 to January 1928. The remainder of his career was spent at Rutgers University, as a professor of physiology and biochemistry starting in 1928 until being made emeritus in 1959. While at Rutgers, he was named the Assistant Dean of Arts and Sciences in 1943 and Chairman of the Department of Physiology and Biochemistry in 1953.

Cole was extremely active with external organizations, including MDI Biological Laboratory where he was a trustee from 1931 to 1952 and the director from 1931 to 1940. He also served as the director of Cold Spring Harbor Laboratory from 1930 to 1952. Additionally, he was an investigator at Bermuda Institute of Ocean Sciences in 1915, Woods Hole Oceanographic Institution in 1925, Pacific Grove Museum of Natural History in 1929, California Institute of Technology in 1937, and the Office of Scientific Research and Development at Columbia University from 1942 to 1943.

While at Rutgers University, Cole played an integral role in the development of the Rutgers Research Council, a faculty committee to advise the university president on research and provide faculty research support. He also served as the council's first director from 1944 to 1959, where he helped expand research opportunities within the sciences and extended opportunities to the humanities. From 1949 to 1951, he was the chairman of the Demarest Motion Picture Committee, an organization set up to support the creation and filming of a documentary on the president of Rutgers from 1906 to 1924, William H.S. Demarest.

After retiring from Rutgers in 1959, William Cole remained quite active in the local and scientific communities. In 1962, he dedicated the Nelson Biological Labs at Rutgers. In 1966, he was involved in the preservation of two historical buildings in New Brunswick, New Jersey. From 1965 until his death in 1967, Cole collaborated on a project focused on Florida seashells with Beatrice and Milton Harris that began as a library and school display project in Naples, Florida and eventually resulted in the publication of a booklet, Some Marine Molluscs From the Central West Coast of Florida.

== Research ==
William Harder Cole's research work focused on skin grafting, animal behavior, protein metabolism, and invertebrate blood. Cole published close to one hundred articles in professional journals, magazines and newspapers. Cole made notable contributions to the understanding of the effects of external stimuli on the beating of barnacle appendages known as cirri, the effect of temperature on the adaptation of Fundulus heteroclitus to white and black backgrounds, and the composition of the body fluids (particularly blood) of invertebrates, including the lobster.
