= Warren Harmon Lewis =

American embryologist (1870–1964)

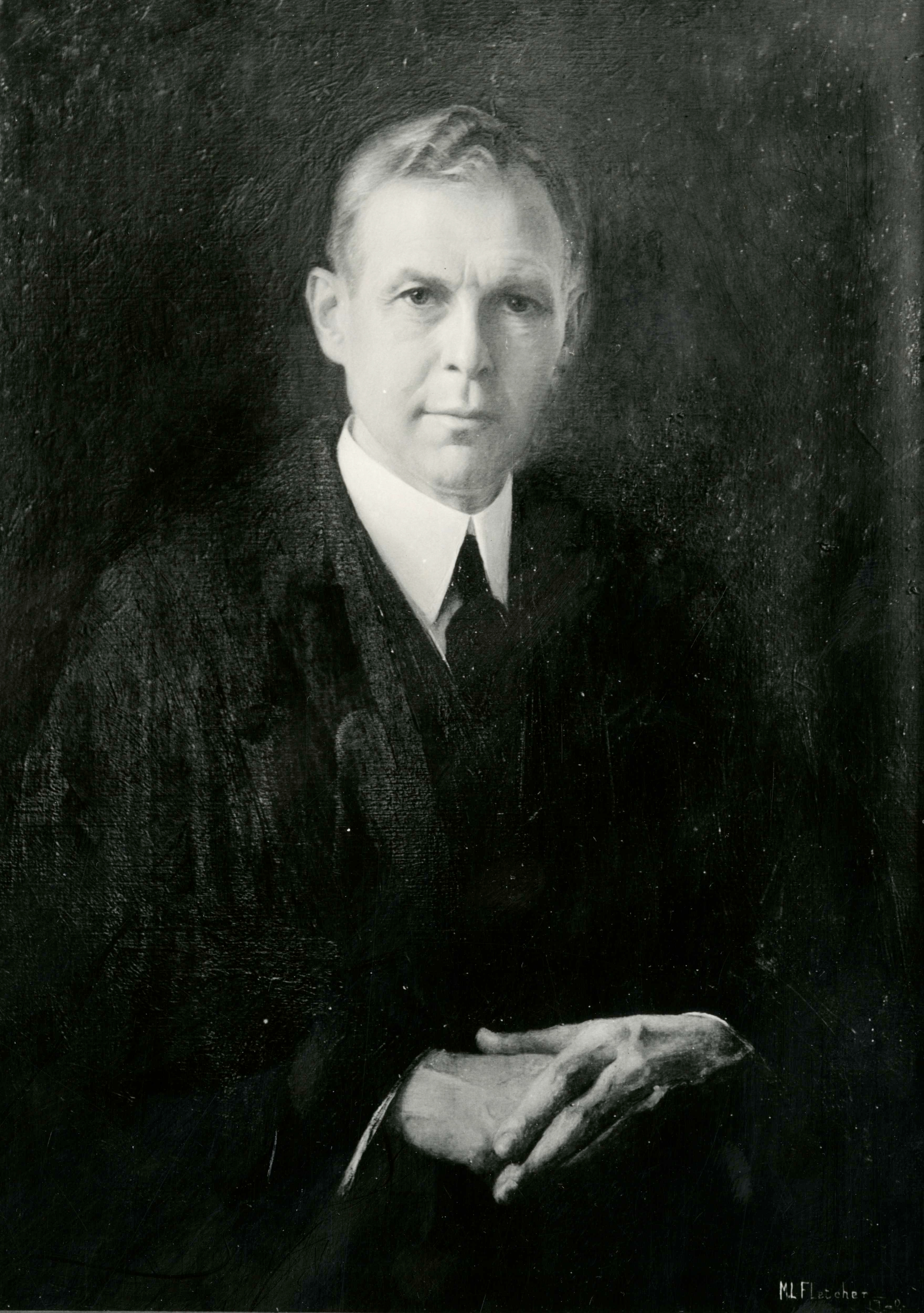
- Portrait painted in 1920
- Born: June 17, 1870; Suffield, Connecticut
- Died: July 3, 1964 (aged 94); Philadelphia, Pennsylvania
- Education: Johns Hopkins University (M.D. 1900); University of Michigan (B.A., 1894)
- Spouse: Margaret Reed Lewis (m. 1910)
- Children: 3
- Scientific career
- Fields: Biology
- Institutions: Johns Hopkins University; Carnegie Institution of Washington; Wistar Institute

Warren Harmon Lewis (June 17, 1870 – July 3, 1964) was an American embryologist and cell biologist. He became professor of physiological anatomy at the Johns Hopkins University School of Medicine in 1913 and from 1919 to 1940, he worked along with his wife Margaret Reed Lewis at the Carnegie Institute of Washington.

== Life and work ==
Lewis was born in Suffield, Connecticut, to Adelaide Eunice (née Harmon) and John Lewis. The family moved to Chicago where his father practiced law. Lewis went to Oak Park public schools and also attended the Chicago Manual Training School. He was interested in botany as a boy and collected plants. He joined the University of Michigan in 1890 where he studied zoology as also French, German, and mathematics. He also took an interest in sports and music. In 1894, he obtained a microscope and was influenced by Jacob Ellsworth Reighard to study medicine. In 1896, he joined Johns Hopkins University in the school of medicine. He spent summers at the Marine Biological Laboratory at Woods Hole in 1895 and in 1901 he worked with Jacques Loeb, examining the effect of potassium cyanide on sea urchin eggs. In 1901, Lewis worked with Charles R. Bardeen on muscles in Franklin P. Mall's lab. In 1902, he went to Bonn and worked with Moritz Nussbaum on the eye. He returned to Baltimore in 1903 and became an associate in the department of anatomy. In 1904, he became an associate professor.

He married Margaret Reed in 1910 and they later researched and published together. After the death of Mall in 1917, the couple was invited by George L. Streeter to the Carnegie Institute's embryology laboratory at Washington. Among their pioneering work was the use of time-lapse films to study embryology. They identified the process that they called as pinocytosis which was differentiated from phagocytosis.

He was an elected member of the National Academy of Sciences and the American Philosophical Society. He served as the 21st president of the Association of American Anatomists from 1934 to 1936, and the International Society for Experimental Cytology, and held honorary memberships in the Royal Microscopical Society in London and Accademia Nazionale dei Lincei in Rome.
