= Bodil Schmidt-Nielsen =

American physiologist (1918–2015)

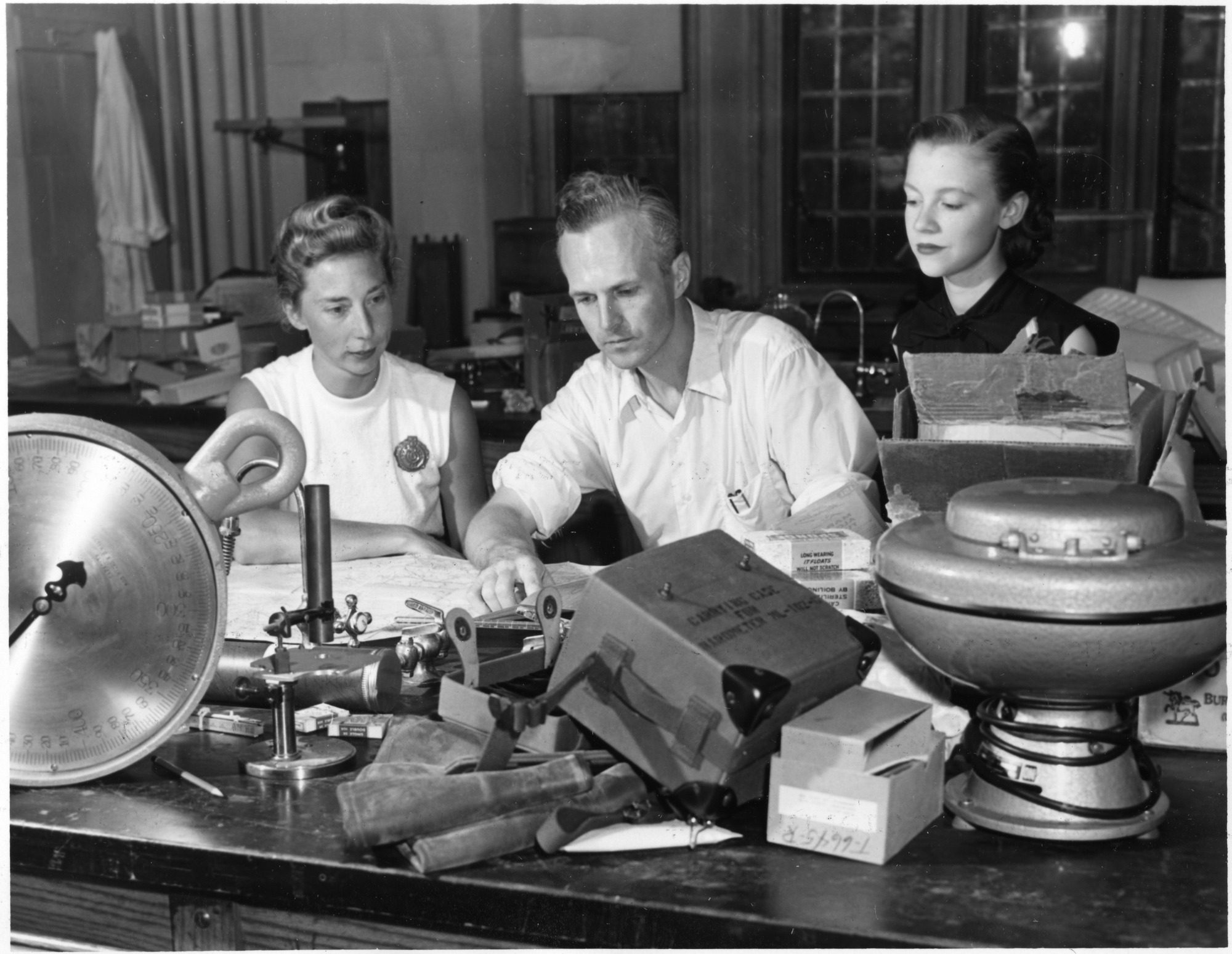
- Bodil Mimi Krogh Schmidt-Nielsen, Knut Schmidt-Nielsen, and Barbara Wagner.
- Born: 6 November 1918; Copenhagen, Denmark
- Died: 27 April 2015 (aged 96)
- Education: University of Copenhagen
- Spouse(s): Knut Schmidt-Nielsen (m. 1939–1966) (divorced) Roger G. Chagnon (m. 1968–2003) (his death)
- Parents: August Krogh (father); Marie Krogh, née Jørgensen (mother)
- Scientific career
- Workplaces: Duke University; Case Western Reserve University; MDI Biological Laboratory

Bodil Schmidt-Nielsen (3 November 1918 – 27 April 2015) was a Danish-born American physiologist, who became the first woman president of the American Physiological Society in 1975. Throughout her life, Schmidt-Nielsen conducted extensive research on the mechanisms of urea transport, paving the way for many other physiological discoveries.

== Biography ==
Bodil Schmidt-Nielsen was born in Copenhagen, Denmark in 1918, the youngest of four children of two eminent physiologists, the Nobel Laureate August Krogh and Marie Krogh.

In 1939, Bodil Schmidt-Nielsen married Knut Schmidt-Nielsen, a fellow physiologist, and received doctoral degrees in Dentistry, Odontology, and Physiology from the University of Copenhagen. Knut and Bodil Schmidt-Nielsen became a prominent physiology team at Duke University but divorced in 1966. Bodil became Department Chair at Case Western Reserve University and later devoted her career full-time to research at MDI Biological Laboratory in Maine.

Schmidt-Nielsen died in April 2015 at the age of 96.

== Distinguished Mentor and Scientist Award ==
The Bodil M. Schmidt-Nielsen Distinguished Mentor and Scientist Award honors a member of the American Physiological Society who is judged to have made outstanding contributions to physiological research and demonstrated dedication and commitment to excellence in training of young physiologists.

== Selected works ==
- The Solubility of tooth substance in relation to the composition of saliva (Supplementum; v.2, 1946)
- The resourcefulness of nature in physiological adaptation to the environment (Physiologist 1(2): 4-20, 1958)
- August and Marie Krogh: Lives in Science (1995)
