= William Horne (tenor) =

American operatic tenor

William Horne (10 August 1913 – 19 April 1983) was an American operatic tenor who, after World War II, performed with the New York City Opera. He was born in Manhattan, New York.

== Career ==
Around 1928, Horne was a member of the children's chorus of the Metropolitan Opera. He went on to study voice at the Curtis Institute of Music during the school years 1935–1936, 1936–1937, and 1937–1938.

=== Selected career highlights, pre-World War II ===
- On June 30, 1937, Horne, accompanied by the Meyer Davis (1893–1976) Orchestra, sang "You Are the Reason for My Love Song" at the wedding of Ethel du Pont and Franklin Delano Roosevelt, Jr., a selection especially composed for the couple by Hilda Emery Davis (née Hodgkins; 1895–1995), wife of the band leader. The lyrics were by Sally Gibbs (1911–2006), daughter of author George Fort Gibbs.
- In 1939, Horne was one of four winners of the International Naumburg Competition. In 1942, he appeared on Broadway in Irving Berlin's revue This Is the Army.
- November 11, 1940, on the NBC Blue Network, Horne was one of four soloists – with Anne Brown (soprano), Winifred Heidt (1920–1995) (contralto), and Lawrence Whisonant (baritone) — in a live performance of Beethoven's Symphony No. 9; Leopold Stokowski conducting the NBC Symphony Orchestra with the Westminster Choir.
- In 1942 & 1943, he was a soloist with the Naumburg Orchestral Concerts, in the Naumburg Bandshell, Central Park, in the summer series.

=== Service in the United States Army ===
In 1942, Horne was inducted into the U.S. Army as a private and assigned to Company C at Camp Upton near Yaphank in Long Island.

=== New York City Opera ===
Horne made his operatic debut with the New York City Opera in 1944, singing the role of Chevalier des Grieux in Puccini's Manon Lescaut. He sang the title role of Benjamin Britten's Peter Grimes in its first United States performance in 1946, conducted by Leonard Bernstein at Tanglewood. Horne also sang Jo the Loiterer, a leading tenor role in the 1947 world premiere of Virgil Thomson's The Mother of Us All in May 1947 at Columbia University's Brander Matthews Hall. In 1948, Horne recorded an album of Kurt Weill's songs under the composer's supervision. Horne later went into private teaching and vocal coaching and worked with Zero Mostel for Fiddler on the Roof.

=== Other notable post-World War II performances ===
In 1946, Horne won an ovation singing the role of Lenski in a performance of Tchaikovsky's Eugene Onegin at Town Hall in New York City. Cleveland-born soprano Brenda Miller and Chicago-born contralto Margery Mayer Voutsas (1918–2014) were the sisters, Tatiana and Olga; Bulgarian-born baritone Ivan Petroff (1899–1963) sang the title role; Laszlo Halasz conducted.

== Selected discography ==
1. Four Walt Whitman Songs (1947)
  William Horne, tenor
  Adam Garner (1898–1969), piano
  Kurt Weill, composer
  1. "Beat! Beat! Drums!"
  2. "Oh Captain! My Captain!"
  3. "Come up from the Fields, Father"
  4. "Dirge for Two Veterans"
  Concert Hall Society, Series B, Album 7
  OCLC 47738124
