= Naohide Yatsu =

Japanese biologist, geneticist, zoologist, and embryologist (1877–1947)

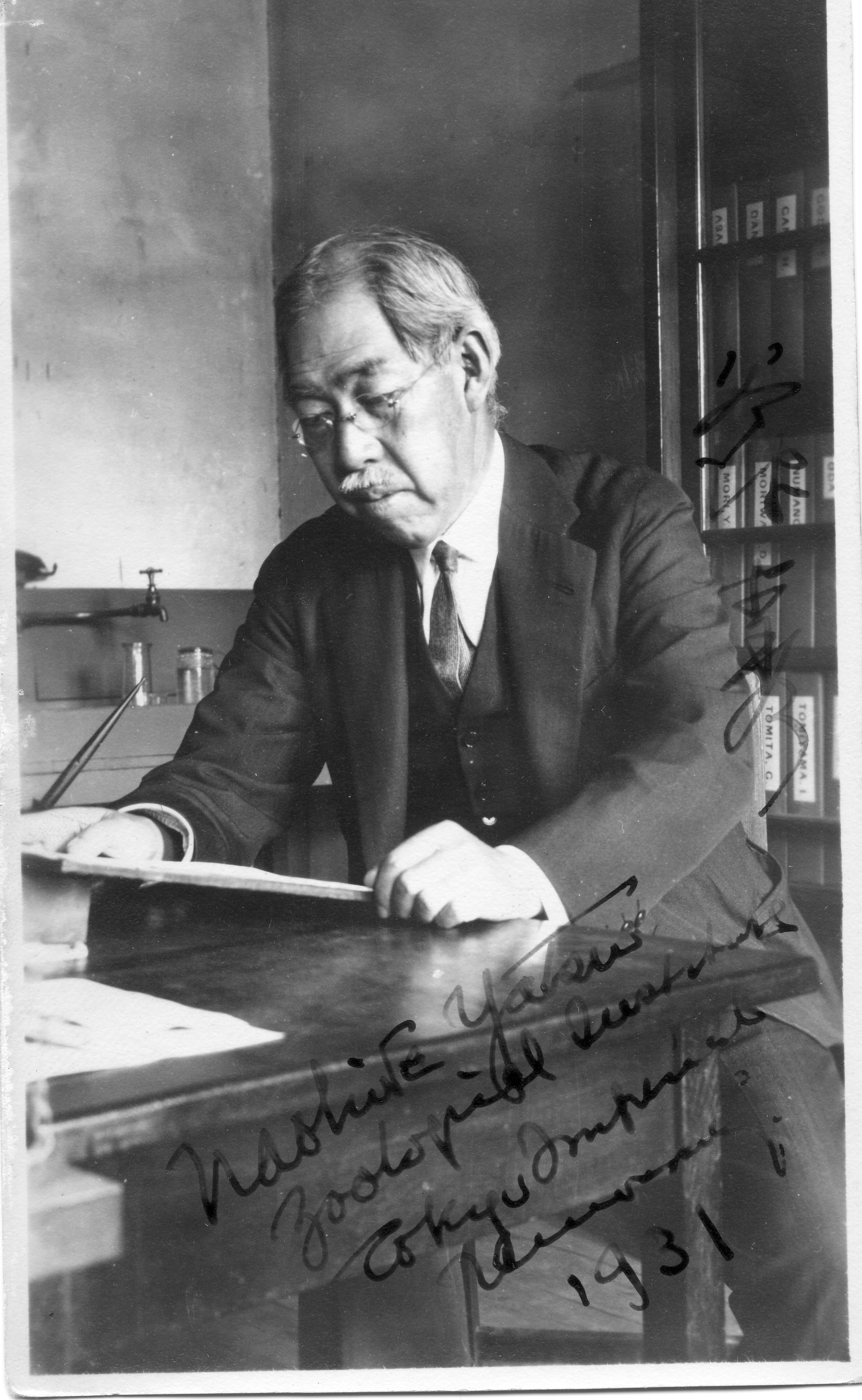
- Naohide Yatsu
- Born: September 8, 1877; Tokyo, Japan
- Died: October 2, 1947 (aged 70)
- Education: University of Tokyo (B.S.); Columbia University (Ph.D.)
- Known for: Pioneer in the field of embryonic induction and zoology of Japan
- Scientific career
- Fields: Genetics; Embryology
- Workplaces: University of Tokyo; Keio University

Naohide Yatsu (September 8, 1877 – October 2, 1947) was a Japanese biologist, geneticist, and embryologist. Yatsu received his Ph.D. from Columbia University and was a pioneer in embryonic induction and laid the foundations for zoology research in Japan.

== Education ==
Yatsu was born in Tokyo in 1877. He moved to Hokkaido with his parents and attended primary school at Hokkai English School. In 1894, he graduated from Kaisei Junior High School and in 1897 he graduated from Daiichi High School. Yatsu completed his undergraduate degree in zoology at the University of Tokyo, studying with Charles Otis Whitman, a pioneer of embryology in Japan. After graduating in 1900, he attended Columbia University where he studied marine invertebrate development and conducted experimental morphology research under Edmund Beecher Wilson and Thomas Hunt Morgan. He stayed six years in the US and Europe, where he worked with MDI Biological Laboratory and published several important papers on cytology and embryology using egg cells where the nucleus had been experimentally removed. Notably, he performed experiments on the developmental potency of different parts of the egg cytoplasm of Cerebratulus where he dissected the eggs into six parts and examined the developmental potency after individually inseminating each part.

After returning to Japan in 1907 as a professor of Zoology at the University of Tokyo, he changed his focus from embryology to zoology. Some have suggested this change in focus was because the Japanese biology institutions did not accept his new and revolutionary experimental approaches for analyzing embryonic development. In 1920, he was named a professor at Keio University School of medicine and was named a member of the Japan Academy in 1936. During his tenure, he served as the president of the Zoological Society of Japan for many years. He retired in 1938 and became an emeritus professor at the University of Tokyo.
