= Signe Schmidt-Nielsen =

Swedish-Norwegian physicist and nutritionist (1878–1959)

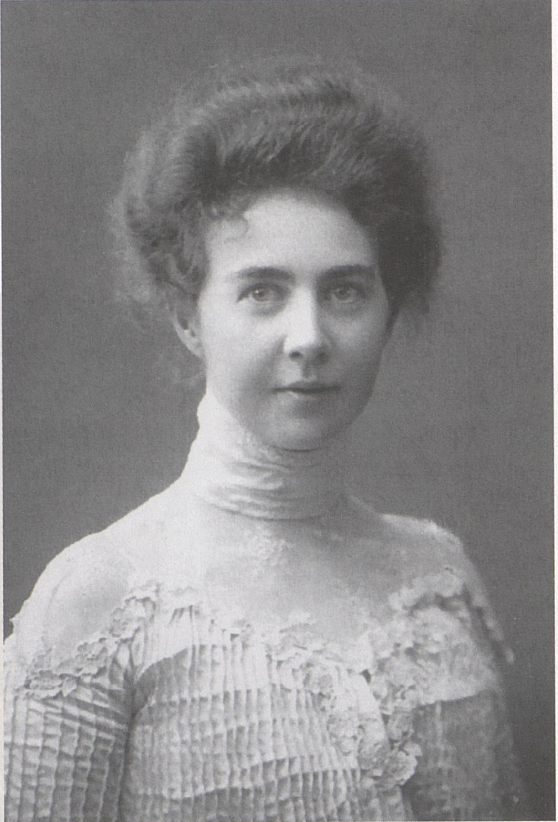
- Schmidt-Nielsen in 1907
- Born: Signe Torborg Sturtzen-Becker; 1 December 1878; Stockholm, Sweden
- Died: 2 October 1956 (aged 77); Stockholm, Sweden
- Burial place: Domkirkegården, Trondheim, Norway
- Education: Stockholm University
- Occupations: Physicist and nutritionist
- Organization: Royal Norwegian Society of Sciences and Letters
- Spouse: Sigval Schmidt-Nielsen (m. 1907)
- Children: 4, including Knut Schmidt-Nielsen
- Relatives: Oscar Patric Sturzen-Becker (paternal grandfather)

Signe Torborg Schmidt-Nielsen (née Sturtzen-Becker, 1 December 1878 – 2 October 1959) was a Swedish-Norwegian physicist and nutritionist. She was the first woman to become a member of the Royal Norwegian Society of Sciences and Letters.

== Family ==
Signe Torborg Sturtzen-Becker was born on 1 December 1878 in Stockholm. Her parents were Vilhelm Teodor Patrik Sturzen-Becker (1841–1910), the son of Swedish poet Oscar Patric Sturzen-Becker, and Astrid Sturzen-Becker (née Paykull, 1848–1908).

Sturtzen-Becker married chemist Sigval Schmidt-Nielsen [no, sv] in 1907 in Stockholm. They had four children, including the physiologist Knut Schmidt-Nielsen (1915–2007), who emigrated to America and worked at Duke University.

== Career ==
Schmidt-Nielsen studied for her PhD in physics at Stockholm University and was one of the first women in Sweden to receive a doctoral degree when she graduated in 1907. She was also the first woman to become a member of the Royal Norwegian Society of Sciences and Letters.

Schmidt-Nielsen collaborated with her husband in natural science research and publications, including into the rennet of calves and the vitamin content of herrings.

== Death ==
Schmidt-Nielsen died in 1959 in Stockholm. She was buried at Domkirkegården, Trondheim, Norway.
