= Ballston Spa High School =

Public school in the United States

Coordinates: 42°59′31.08″N 73°51′11.05″W

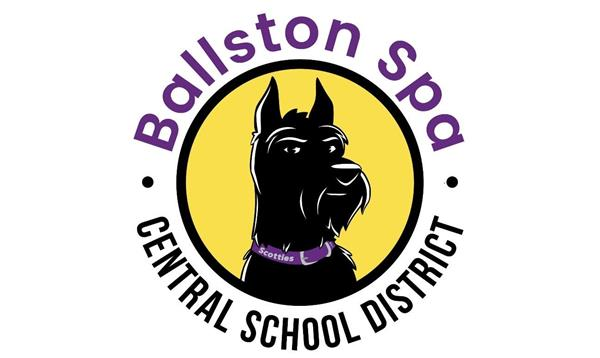

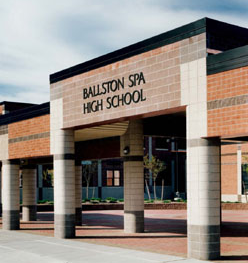
- 220 Ballston Avenue; Ballston Spa, NY 12020; Saratoga; United States

Information
- Type: Public
- Motto: Educating Everyone Takes Everyone
- Established: c 1998
- School district: Ballston Spa Central School District
- Superintendent: Gianleo Duca
- Principal: Matthew Robinson
- Teaching staff: 109.96 (FTE)
- Enrollment: 1,300 (2024–2025)
- Student to teacher ratio: 11.82
- Colors: Purple and Gold
- Mascot: Scottie dog
- Website: https://highschool.bscsd.org/

Ballston Spa High School is a public high school located in Ballston Spa, New York, United States. It is part of the Ballston Spa Central School District, which covers the towns of Ballston, Milton, and Malta in Saratoga County. The mascot is the Scottie dog, dedicated to long-time athletic director/coach Coach William R. Scott. The school colors are Purple and Gold but the complementary (alternative) color of black is often used.

The high school was shifted to a new building in 1998; it remains on the same campus as the previous high school, which now functions as a middle school. Prior to moving to current complex in the 1950s, Ballston Spa High School was located in what is now Malta Avenue Elementary School. Graduating class sizes range from 300 to 400, resulting in a total student population of around 1,400.

== Courses ==
Ballston Spa offers a variety of courses in many fields. Students may take advanced courses in math, science or technology, or focus more on the arts.

=== Advisory periods ===
Each academic department maintains an "advisory room" and each teacher advisory hours. Similar to a professor's office hours at college, these are provided so that students can seek help during their study halls.

=== IB courses ===
Ballston Spa started offering students the International Baccalaureate curriculum in the fall of 2012. In the spring of 2024 it was announced by the Ballston Spa Board of Education that the IB program would be cancelled and no new students would be enrolled. Juniors and Seniors enrolled in the program during the 2023–2024 school year will be allowed to finish the program.

== Athletics ==
Ballston Spa's athletic program is a member of the Suburban Council. Ballston Spa offers many sports at the Modified, Freshman, Junior Varsity, and Varsity level for both boys and girls. The gymnasium at the high school is colloquially referred to as "The Ballston Garden." The currently offered Varsity sports are:

Varsity Boys' Teams

- Football
- Outdoor track and field
- Baseball
- Lacrosse
- Tennis
- Soccer
- Swimming / Diving
- Golf
- Cross Country
- Indoor Track and Field
- Bowling
- Basketball
- Wrestling
- Ice Hockey (merged program with Burnt Hills-Ballston Lake)
- Cheerleading (Girls/Boys)
- Robotics (Girls/Boys)

Varsity Girls' Teams

- Outdoor Track and Field
- Softball
- Lacrosse
- Tennis
- Soccer
- Swimming/Diving
- Volleyball
- Cross Country
- Indoor Track and Field
- Bowling
- Basketball
- Cheerleading (Girls/Boys)
- Robotics (Girls/Boys)
- Skiing (merged program with Burnt Hills-Ballston Lake) (2010-11 NYSPHSAA State Champions)

The Athletics section of the website contains a wealth of information on the athletics programs in the district, and is accessed through www.bscsd.org.

== Extracurricular ==
Ballston Spa's Science Olympiad team, advised by physics teachers, placed fourth in regionals for the 2006 season, and has frequently gone to state competitions. The team placed 3rd at regionals and a new school record of 23rd in states for the 2008 season. The team also finished 3rd in the 2010 season. The Mock Trial team, advised by a history teacher, also has a good record, placing well in the 2006–2007 season. A Biology teacher runs the Envirothon team, which has also frequently gone on to the state competition. They placed very well at states in the 2007 season and finished second in New York State in 2000. Ballston Spa also has an Odyssey of the Mind team.

=== National Honor Society ===
The Ballston Spa Chapter of the National Honor Society contains over fifty members from the Junior and Senior classes and is very active in the Ballston Spa community.

== Notable alumni ==
- William Harder Cole (1892 – 1967), biologist and science educator
- Abba Verbeck Newton (1908–1996), American mathematician
- Riley Walz (born 2002), software engineer and artist
- Antoni Wyche (born 1977), former basketball player and coach

== See also ==
- New York State Education Department
- University of the State of New York
- Education in the United States
