= Meyer Davis (musician) =

- Picture of musician Meyer Davis
- Born: Meyer L Davis; 9 January 1892; Ellicott City, Maryland, U.S.
- Died: 6 April 1976 (aged 84); New York City, U.S.
- Occupation: Musician
- Spouse: Hilda Emery Davis (Hodgkins)
- Children: Virginia Davis; Meyer Davis Jr; Sol Gareth Davis; Emery Davis; Marjorie Davis

Meyer Davis (9 January 1892 – 6 April 1976) was a society musician in the 1920s to 1960s who at the height of his career owned and operated over 80 bands with more than 1,000 musicians playing for him.

== Early life ==
Davis was born in Ellicott City, Maryland, to Solomon David and Rose Benjamin. His parents were of Russian Jewish ancestry from what is today Lithuania and Latvia. Davis, who began taking violin lessons as a child, began his musical career while a law student. From 1917 to 1930, Davis became the manager of the Chevy Chase Lake resort providing dance orchestras that appeared regularly through the vacation season.

== Career ==
In 1915, Davis founded his first band, which was eventually named the Meyer Davis Orchestra.

Davis became a major player in the society music scene in the East Coast of the United States in the 1950s and 60s. He played a wide range of events from balls to presidential galas and inaugurations for presidents including Gerald Ford, Woodrow Wilson and Franklin Roosevelt.

Davis died in 1976 at his home in 101 Central Park West in New York City. The archive of his career is now held at the University of Maine's Fogler Library.

== Family ==
Davis married composer and musician Hilda Emery, who also played piano in his band.

The couple's oldest child, Virginia, was a noted soprano and performed across the United States. Davis's second son Garry Davis was a controversial international peace activist. Davis's youngest son Emery Davis (1923–2018) took over his band after his retirement and continued operating as an accomplished musician in his own right into the 1990s.
