= Sten Odenwald =

American astronomer

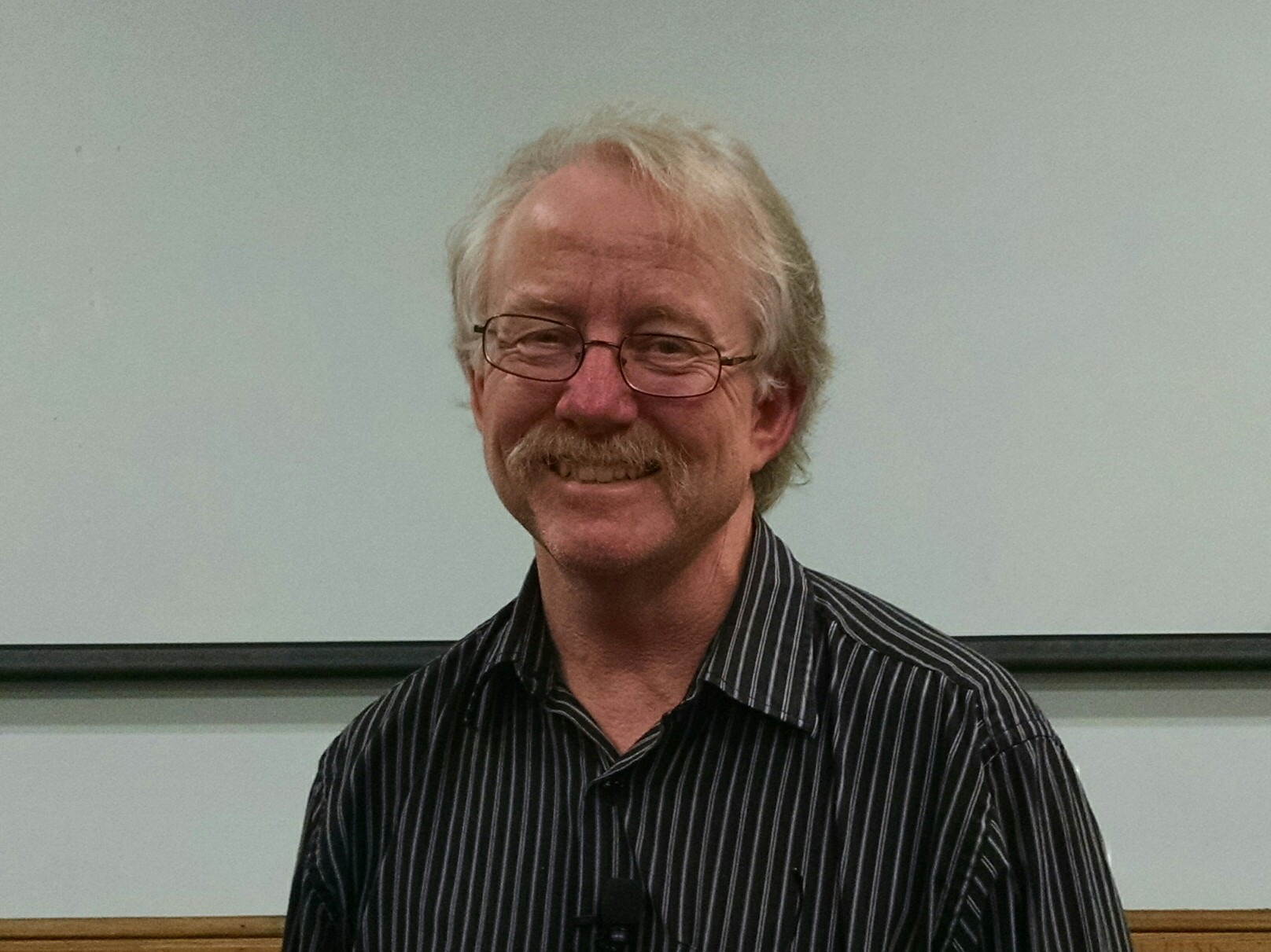
- Born: Sten Felix Odenwald; November 23, 1952 (age 73); Karlskoga, Sweden
- Citizenship: United States
- Education: University of California, Berkeley, Harvard University
- Scientific career
- Fields: Physics, astronomy, science communication
- Thesis: A Far-Infrared Survey of the Galactic Center (1982)
- Doctoral advisor: Prof. Giovanni Fazio
- Other academic advisors: Prof. Eric Chaisson
- Website: The Astronomy Cafe

Sten Felix Odenwald (born November 23, 1952) is an American astronomer, author, and NASA scientist-educator. He has worked as part of the NASA Cosmic Background Explorer, Diffuse Infrared Background Experiment investigating the cosmic infrared background. He has published four books: The Astronomy Cafe, The 23rd Cycle, Patterns in the Void and Back to the Astronomy Cafe. He has also appeared in a number of TV and radio documentaries on astronomy and space weather. Since receiving his Ph.D. in astronomy from Harvard University in 1982, he has been an astronomer in the Washington, D.C. area, primarily at NASA's Goddard Spaceflight Center in Greenbelt, Maryland. Since 2000, he has been actively involved in science and math education at NASA, and was a founding member of the Sun-Earth Connection Education Forum, among many other high-visibility NASA education projects involving space weather issues, archeoastronomy and the transits of Venus in 2004 and 2012. He is currently the director of STEM Education at the National Institute of Aerospace.

== Early life ==
At Harvard, Odenwald studied accretion disks around supermassive black holes. He then worked with Dr. Giovanni Fazio, and completed his Ph.D. in 1982 by investigating the far-infrared properties of the Galactic Center of the Milky Way and the interstellar environment of a million-solar-mass black hole found there. He also worked at the Columbia Scientific Balloon Facility in Palestine, Texas, participating in high-altitude balloon launches involving the 1-meter infrared telescope that Fazio and his team built in 1975. At Harvard, he was the teaching assistant for Owen Gingerich and David Latham.

== Career ==
Following the completion of his Ph.D., Odenwald moved to Washington, D.C., in 1982, where he worked as a postdoctoral candidate at the Space Sciences Division of the Naval Research Laboratory until 1990. There, he continued his partnership with the Harvard-Smithsonian balloon program and wrote a series of papers on various star-forming regions in the Cygnus X region of the Milky Way including DR-6, DR-7, DR-22 as well as DR-15 and DR-20. He also investigated star-forming regions associated with supernova remnants such as IC-433 and W-28 in order to find evidence for star formation triggered by supernova remnant impacts. Subsequently, he worked with the IRAS infrared data to investigate the frequency and distribution of young stellar objects in the Cygnus-X region, detect asteroidal debris disks surrounding sun-like stars, and conducted an investigation of a new class of interstellar dust clouds that he had discovered, beginning with the archetype of this class called the Draco Cloud. This was the first time that astronomers had discovered hydrodynamical processes acting in the interstellar medium to sculpt the shapes of interstellar dust clouds. At NRL, and working with Dr. Kandiah Shivanandan, he built a cryogenically cooled array camera that operated in the mid-infrared, and made frequent trips to the Wyomning Infrared Observatory (WIRO) to collaborate with Prof. Harley Thronsen to map a variety of compact infrared sources. The details of this camera and its scientific results were published in 1992.

After a brief stint working for NASA headquarters pursuing education projects, he joined Dr. Mike Hauser with the Cosmic Background Explorer (COBE) Team in 1992, working on the Diffuse Infrared Background Experiment (DIRBE). In addition to continuing his investigations of the Cygnus-X region using the new DIRBE far-infrared data, he made the discovery that the DIRBE instrument could detect over 100 galaxies beyond the Milky Way. This was a capacity that the COBE Science Team had not considered. This led to a breakthrough paper detailing the quantity of very cold interstellar dust in these galaxies, which were all spiral-type. In addition to investigating individual extragalactic sources, Odenwald collaborated with Dr. Alexander Kashlinsky and Dr. John Mather, who were investigating the cosmic infrared background, which as yet had not been detected by 1997. When the COBE program ended, Odenwald continued his collaboration with Kashlinsky and Mather, which led to a number of papers related to the cosmic infrared background radiation and traces of its structure at infrared wavelengths. Since 2005, Odenwald's research has focused on space weather, specifically the way in which solar storms cause economic damage to satellites in space.

== The Astronomy Cafe ==
The Astronomy Cafe is a website that Odenwald started in 1995 as an experiment in public education using the then-new medium of the World Wide Web, which could now be navigated with the MOSAIC web browser. It initially offered essays and collections of visual imagery in astronomy. Odenwald debuted the "Ask the Astronomer" section of the site in 1996, where he invited people to email questions about astronomy, and he would post the answers. The Astronomy Café traffic grew, and by 1998, "Ask the Astronomer" had reached 3000 questions. Over the years, Odenwald has created web resources in space weather, and a variety of NASA resources such as SpaceMath@NASA.

== Books ==
- The Astronomy Cafe,1998, W.H. Freeman
- The 23rd Cycle: Learning to live with a stormy star, 2001, Columbia University Press
- Patterns in the Void: Why Nothing is Important, 2002, Westview Press
- Concepts in Space Science, 2002, Universities Press: ISRO,
- Back to the Astronomy Cafe, 2003, Westview Press
- Stepping Through the Stargate, 2004, Benbella Books, chapter "Stargate: The Final Frontier?"
- Heliophysics II Space Storms and Radiation: Causes and Effects, 2008, Elsever Press, K. Schrijver and G. Siscoe, eds
- The International Handbook of Innovation Education, 2012, Taylor & Francis/Routledge
- A Degree in a Book: Cosmology, 2019, Arcturus Publishing
- Knowledge in a Nutshell: Astrophysics, 2019, Arcturus Publishing
- Knowledge in a Nutshell: Quantum Physics, 2020, Arcturus Publishing

Self-published books:

- Solar Storms: 2000 years of human calamity, 2015, CreateSpace
- Exploring Quantum Space, 2015, CreateSpace
- Interstellar Travel:An Astronomer's Guide, 2015, CreateSpace
- Interplanetary Travel: An Astronomer's Guide, 2015, CreateSpace
- Eternity: A User's Guide, 2015, CreateSpace
- A Guide to Smartphone Astrophotography

== Awards ==
- 1975 - UC Berkeley: "Most Outstanding Undergraduate in Astronomy"
- 1975 - Smithsonian Pre-doctoral Fellowship (Three years)
- 1991 - BDM, Science Writer's Award for NASA's "Space Astronomy Update"
- 1994 - COBE Working Group Award for Outstanding Service
- 1995 - YAHOO Top Site of the Week: 'The Astronomy Cafe'
- 1996 - Macmillan Top 5% of the Web: 'The Astronomy Cafe'
- 1998 - AAAS Science NetLinks Web Award for excellence in content.
- 1999 - NASA Goddard Award of Excellence in Outreach
- 1999 - Crystal Award for best educational Video 'Blackout!'
- 1999 - Telly Award for best educational video, "Blackout!"
- 2000 - AAS Solar Physics Division Popular Science Writing Award
- 2001 - Raytheon ITSS, Education and Public Outreach Award
- 2002 - Emmy Award for Educational TV Program - NASA/CONNECT
- 2003 - Telly Award for Educational TV Program - NASA/CONNECT
- 2004 - Emmy Award for Educational TV Program 'Transit of Venus' NASA/CONNECT
- 2005 - NASA Education Group Achievement Award 'Transit of Venus'
- 2006 - Excellence in Outreach Award - Eclipse 2006: In a Different Light'
- 2013 - NASA Education Group Achievement Award 'Transit of Venus'
