= Rhoda Erdmann =

German biologist (1870–1935)

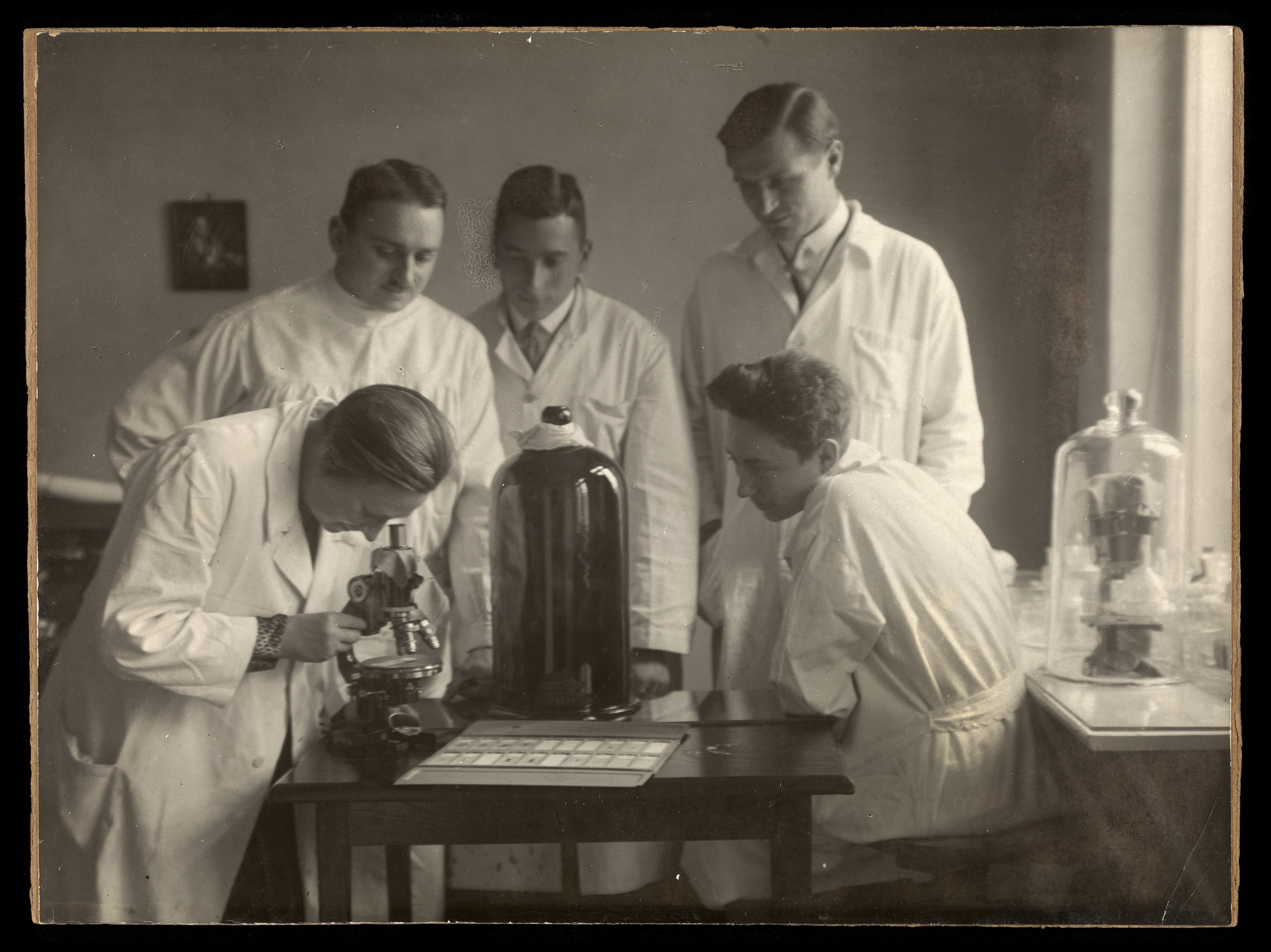
Erdmann (left) in her Berlin laboratory, 1929

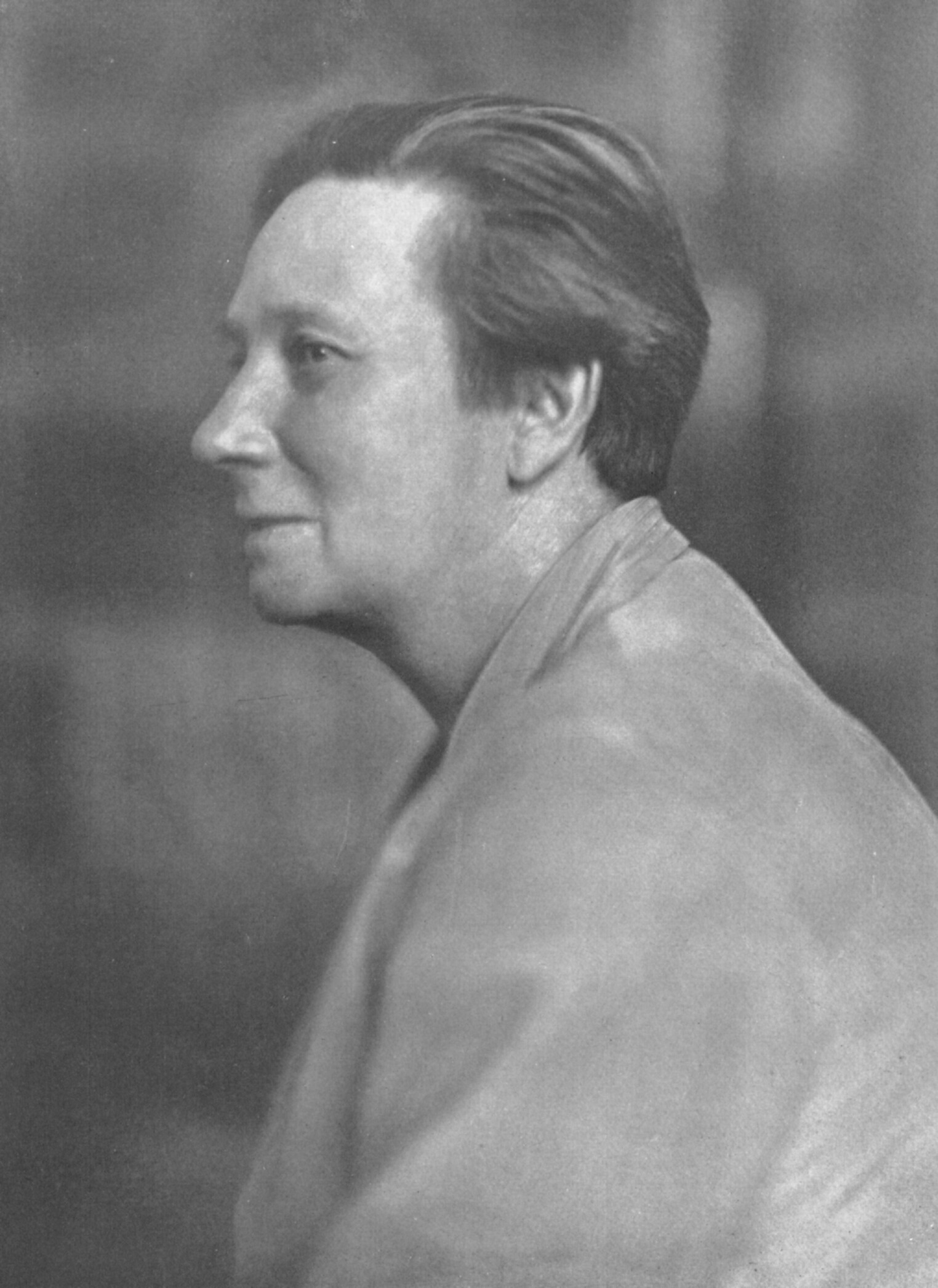
Rhoda Erdmann in the 1930s

Rhoda Erdmann (5 December 1870 – 23 August 1935) was a German cell biologist. Working in the early 1900s, Erdmann was a pioneer of cellular biology and one of few women in her field at the time. Erdmann's work centered around the reproduction of protozoa, with a particular interest in tissue culture and in vitro cellular reproduction. Her work as a protozoologist earned her a graduate student lecturing position at Yale University, though her time in America was cut short by anti-German sentiment surrounding World War I. After a forcible incarceration and then deportation in 1919, Erdmann took a research position at the Institute for Cancer Research at the Charité Hospital of the Friedrich Wilhelm University of Berlin. There she instituted the first department for experimental cytology in Germany. She worked at the University for almost 10 years before receiving on official professorship in 1929. Her work was interrupted yet again with the rise of Nazism in 1933, when she was stripped of her professorship position. She died in Berlin in 1935.

== Career ==
=== Education ===
After passing the required examination in 1892, she moved first to England and then later Romania to work as a teacher, ultimately ending with a position at a Volksschule in Hamburg in 1899. In 1900, she earned first-class honors in the examination for teaching.

In 1903, Erdmann left her teaching position to continue her studies. She took courses in zoology and botany at the Friedrich Wilhelm University of Berlin, the University of Zurich, Marburg University, and the Ludwig-Maximilians-Universität München. She worked with living animal materials at the Naples Zoological Station, and passed the university qualifying examination in 1907 which she received from the Realgymnasium in Kassel (Hessen). She received a Ph.D. in biology from the Ludwig-Maximilians-Universität München in 1908, working in the laboratory of Richard Hertwig. Her dissertation, Experimentelle Untersuchung der Massenverhältnisse von Plasma, Kern und Chromosomen in dem sich entwickelnden Seeigelei, (Experimental investigation of the mass ratios of plasma, nucleus and chromosomes in the developing sea urchin egg) established her career as a protozoologist. She was one of the first women doctoral students in Germany, as women had only been allowed to pursue doctoral research beginning in the year 1900.

=== Cytological research ===
After receiving her Ph.D., Erdmann went on to work as a research assistant at the Institute for Infectious Diseases at the Robert Koch Institute and Charité Hospital of Berlin, where she worked from 1908 to 1913. Working with August von Wassermann, Erdmann attempted to develop vaccines against Cyanophilia viruses (now recognized at H7 High Pathogenicity Avian Influenza) in chickens. In 1913, she received a one-year fellowship from the Rockefeller Foundation to conduct cytological research at the Osborn Zoological Laboratory at Yale University. At Yale, she worked with Ross Granville Harrison, the noted developmental biologist on methods to propagate cells in vitro. After her fellowship ended, she received an offer from Harrison to return to Yale as a lecturer—remarkable, given Yale's charter had to be changed to admit a woman as faculty. From 1915 to 1918, she was a member of the Yale faculty and the first woman member of the Yale Graduate Faculty. In 1915, she was named a research associate at the Rockefeller Institute for Medical Research in Princeton, where she spent summers studying tissue culture techniques. Erdmann was able to successfully culture chicken bone marrow cells as part of her attempts to attenuate the cyanolophia virus. These studies were important for future work in the fields of hematology and virology. In addition, her work on the survival of Paramecium cultures led to important insights on cellular senescence and methods of genetic transmission.

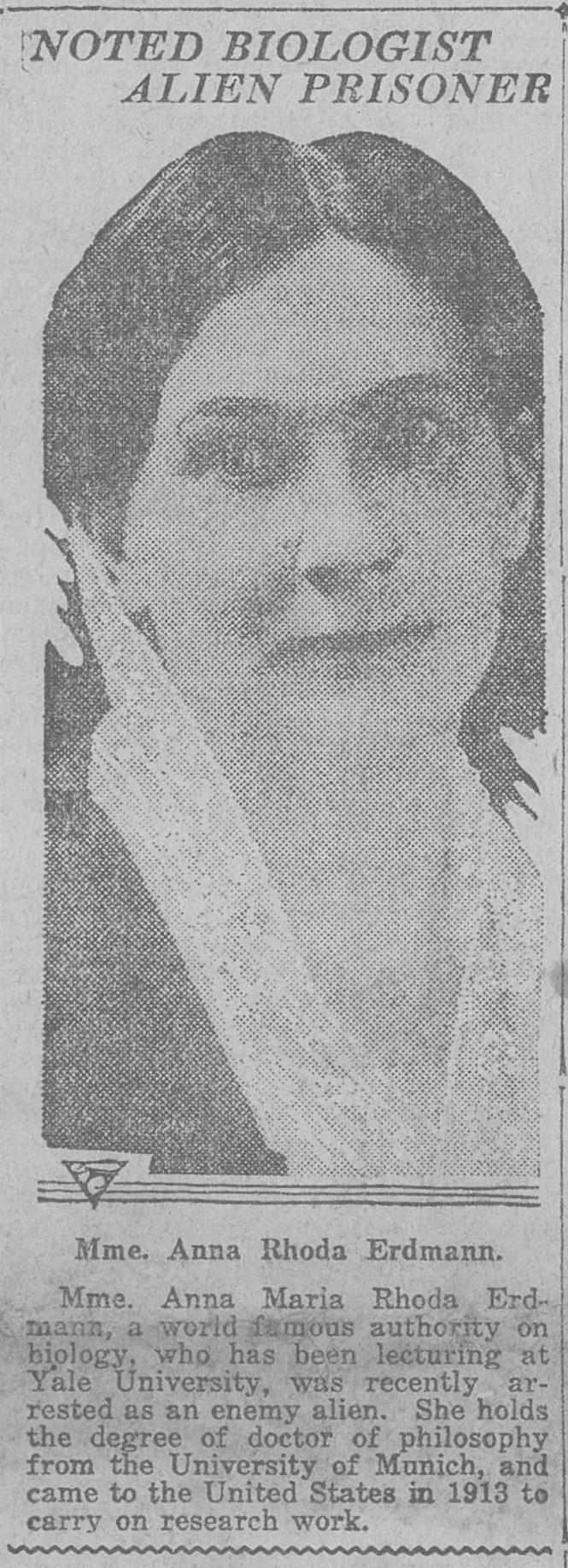
Clip from the front page of The Ogden Standard (newspaper), Ogden City, Utah on Wednesday May 15, 1918

Her work at Yale and Princeton was interrupted by World War I. Wartime hysteria cast suspicion on German citizens; as a German citizen working in biology, people began to suspect Erdmann of culturing malicious bacteria. In 1918 Erdmann was accused of poisoning the New Haven drinking water supply and introducing chicken cholera to the U.S. She lost her job at Yale in February 1918, and was jailed from May until September, when she was bailed out by Harrison and a number of her female friends. She was then deported to Germany the following spring.

=== Experimental cell research ===
Erdmann struggled to find work in Germany, and it was a full year before she got a position at the Institute for Cancer Research at the Charité Hospital of the Friedrich Wilhelm University of Berlin. There she established a department of experimental cell research, the first of its kind in Germany. She received faculty status in the Zoology department at the university in 1920. In 1922 she published Praktikum der Gewebspflege, a manual on tissue culture intended to make the method widely accessible to future biological researchers. She was appointed to the medical faculty in 1923, and promoted to Associate Professor with full civil service status in 1929. In April 1930, her department was officially separated and named the Institute of Experimental Cytology (Institut für Experimentell Zellforschung), where she served as director.

At the institute, she introduced tissue culture methods that she had learned in the U.S. Among her many contributions was the demonstration that cancer could be propagated by cell-free filtrates containing viruses She was the first German woman to lead a university institute. Erdmann also founded the periodical Archiv für experimentelle Zellforschung in 1925 and served as its editor until her death. She conceived the idea of an International Society for Experimental Cytology and served as permanent its general secretary.

=== Forced retirement ===
When the Nazis came to power in 1933, she was banned from laboratory work after having been denounced by the eugenicist Henry Zeiss and the orthopedic surgeon Hermann Gocht, as being Jewish. When this turned out to be untrue, she was accused of helping her Jewish students to secure positions and emigrate. Her institute was then closed, and she was forced to retire. She was jailed in the spring of 1933 for two weeks by the Gestapo, but was released due to international pressure. However, in 1934 the German Government opened another institute for experimental cytology under her direction. She was active until her death, having recently completed a manuscript.

In 1992, the German section of the European Tissue Culture Association created a research fund in Dr. Erdmann's name. In 2016, the Rhoda Erdmann House opened on the Life Sciences North Campus of Humbold University of Berlin. Due to its curved shape and green metal facade, the Rhoda Erdmann House on Philippstraβe is known as the "Green Amoeba."

== Life and education ==
Anna Maria Rhoda Erdmann was born in Hersfeld, Hessen, on 5 December 1870. The daughter of Anna Maria and Dr. Heinrick E. Erdmann (who was a high school teacher), Erdmann grew up in a family of scientists and physicians. Erdmann attended St. John's school for girls in Hamburg, where she trained to be a teacher of high-school and middle-school aged girls. Erdmann then worked as a teacher for around 9 years before her later career advancements, because it was nearly the only academically inclined career for women in Germany. Following her long and eventful career in research, Erdmann died in Berlin on 24 August 1935 at the age of 64 from a heart attack.

=== Feminist contributions ===
Rhoda Erdmann is considered a role model and pioneer as she was a member of the first generation of women who were able to pursue a career in the academic field. She was a contributor to a book called "Leading Women in Europe" where she spoke of her experiences and the difficulties faced when competing with male scientists. She had the perspective that the views women working in science were often overshadowed by men in the field. Erdmann noticed that women were often assigned simpler routine tasks that kept them too busy to perform their own research. In her biography Erdmann notes that she had to "carve out her academic standing for herself by hard work".

== Recognition ==
- In 1997, the Free University of Berlin established the Rhoda Erdmann Programme as a continuing education programme for young female researchers.
- The Rhoda Erdmann Haus of the Humboldt University of Berlin is located in the historical North Campus in Berlin Mitte and was opened in 2016. On the 5th of July in 2017, a bronze bust of Erdmann, created by the artist Anna Franziska Schwarzbach, was revealed.
- A park in Berlin Grunewald was named after Erdmann.
- In Munich, in the district Allach-Untermenzing, a street was named after her.

== Selected works ==
- Praktikum der Gewebspflege (in German). Berlin. 1922.
- Kern, Elga, ed. (1999) [1928]. "Autobiografie". Führende Frauen Europas (in German). München. pp. 93–107.
- "Immunization against cyanolophia". Proceedings of the Society for Experimental Biology and Medicine. 14 (8): 156–161. 1917. doi:10.3181/00379727-14-93.
- "Cytological observations on the behavior of chicken bone marrow in plasma medium". American Journal of Anatomy. 22: 73–125. 1917. doi:10.1002/aja.1000220105.
- "Endomixis and size variations in pure lines of Paramecium aurelia". Proceedings of the Society for Experimental Biology and Medicine. 16 (5): 60–65. 1918. doi:10.3181/00379727-16-37.
- "Erzeugung des Flexner-Jobling-Tumors durch Filtrate". Zeitschrift für Krebsforschung (in German). 27 (1–2): 69. 1928. doi:10.1007/BF02184786.
