= Carnegie Institute =

Carnegie Institute may refer to:

- Carnegie Institute, operator of the Carnegie Museums of Pittsburgh, Pittsburgh, Pennsylvania
- Carnegie Institution for Science, formally known as the Carnegie Institution of Washington, Washington, D.C.
- Carnegie Institute of Technology, predecessor to Carnegie Mellon University in Pittsburgh, Pennsylvania
