= New Hampshire Department of Environmental Services =

Government agency in the U.S. state of New Hampshire

Agency overview
- Formed: January 1987
- Jurisdiction: New Hampshire
- Headquarters: 29 Hazen Drive; Concord, New Hampshire
- Agency executives: Robert R. Scott, Commissioner; Adam Crepeau, Assistant Commissioner
- Website: www.des.nh.gov

The New Hampshire Department of Environmental Services (NHDES) is a state agency of the U.S. state of New Hampshire, headquartered in Concord. The department works to "sustain a high quality of life for all citizens by protecting and restoring the environment and public health" in the state. The department is authorized under New Hampshire Revised Statutes Annotated (NH RSA) Chapter 21-O.

The department consists of three divisions: Air Resources Division, Water Division, and Waste Management Division. The Water Division includes the New Hampshire Water Council and the New Hampshire Wetlands Council. Additionally, the New Hampshire Geological Survey is administratively attached to the department.

In January 2022, a bill was introduced in the New Hampshire House of Representatives that proposed changing the name of the agency to New Hampshire Department of Environmental Protection.
