= Richard Hertwig =

German zoologist (1850–1937)

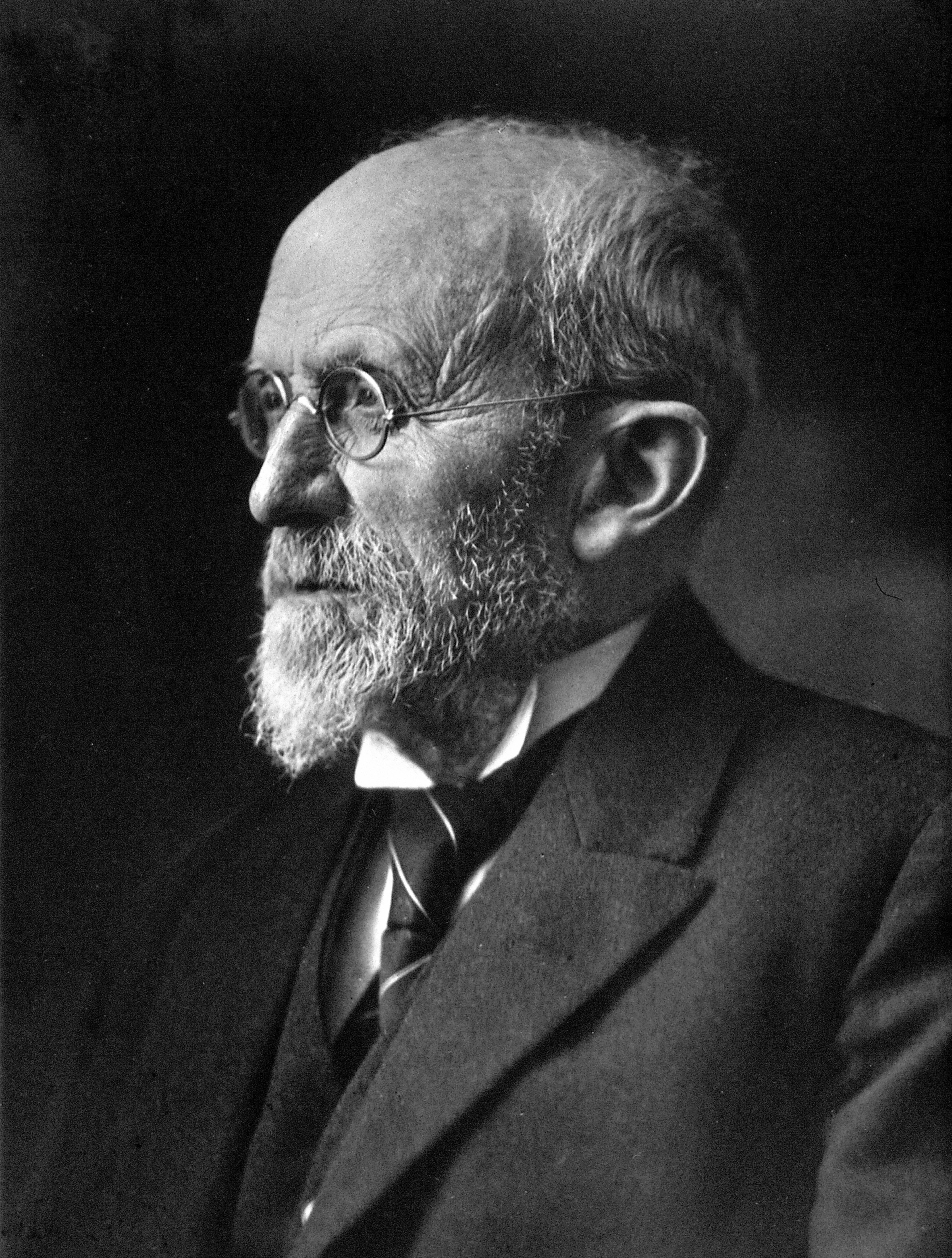
Richard Hertwig in 1930

Richard Wilhelm Karl Theodor Ritter von Hertwig (23 September 1850 – 3 October 1937), also Richard Hertwig or Richard von Hertwig, was a German zoologist and professor of 50 years, notable as the first to describe zygote formation as the fusing of spermatozoa inside the membrane of an egg cell during fertilization. Richard Hertwig was the younger brother of Oscar Hertwig, who also analyzed zygote formation.

The Hertwig brothers were the most eminent scholars of Ernst Haeckel (and Carl Gegenbaur), each brother becoming a long-term professor in Germany. They were independent of Haeckel's philosophical speculations but took his ideas in a positive way to widen their concepts in zoology. Initially, between 1879 and 1883, they worked together and performed embryological studies, especially on the theory of the coelom (1881). These problems were based on the phylogenetic theorems of Haeckel, specifically, the biogenic theory (German: biogenetisches Grundgesetz) and the "gastraea theory" of Haeckel.

Within 10 years, the two brothers moved apart to the north and south of Germany. Richard's brother Oscar later became a professor of anatomy in 1888 in Berlin; however, Richard Hertwig had moved 3 years prior, becoming a professor of zoology in Munich from 1885 to 1925, at Ludwig-Maximilians-Universität München (LMU Munich), where he served the last 40 years of his 50-year career as a professor at 4 universities.

The later research of Richard Hertwig focused on protists (with the relationship between the nucleus and the plasma = "Kern-Plasma-Relation"), as well as on developmental physiological studies on sea urchins and frogs. Richard Hertwig also wrote a leading textbook of zoology, published in 1891, which he kept up to date through 15 editions until 1931.

== Life ==
Hertwig was born in Friedberg in the Grand Duchy of Hesse. He began studying medicine at the University of Jena, and under the influence of professor Ernst Haeckel (16 years older), he shifted his interest more to zoology and biology. In 1872, he received a doctorate at the University of Bonn and worked there as an assistant to anatomist Max Schultze. In 1875, he moved to the University of Jena in the Department of Zoology, and in 1878, Hertwig became extraordinary professor there.

As a successor of Franz Hermann Troschel, Richard Hertwig was appointed in 1881 to the University of Königsberg as a professor of zoology. In 1883, he moved to the same role as professor at the University of Bonn, where he remained only a short while, however, since in 1885, he was called to LMU Munich, where Hertwig remained until 1925, also working as head of the zoological collection of the state of Bavaria (now Zoologische Staatssammlung München) and as director of the zoological institute which he developed into a leading centre of biological science.

Hertwig belonged to the Bavarian Academy of Sciences, beginning in 1885 as an extraordinary member, and from 1889 as a full member. In 1909, he received the title Ritter von.

Hertwig died on 3 October 1937 in Schlederloh, Germany.

His pupil Otto Koehler became one of the founders of Ethology in Germany. Another of his students, Ivan Buresh, was a leading Bulgarian natural scientist. His student Rhoda Erdmann was well known for her studies of invertebrates and cancer and was a pioneer in the field of tissue culture. She founded and led the Institute of Experimental Cytology at the University of Berlin. She also was the founder and editor of the journal Archiv für Experimentelle Zellforschung.

== Research ==
At the beginning of his career, Richard Hertwig worked along with his brother, Oscar Hertwig. Together they developed, in 1881, the Coelom Theory (German: "Coelomtheorie"), of the fluid-filled body cavity (the "coelom"), as an explanation of the middle Keimblatt, which brought important realizations in the field of embryology. The theory assumes that all organs and tissues develop differently from three primary tissue layers, during animal embryogenesis.

Hertwig worked systematically on several groups of protozoa and metazoa (German: Wirbellose) and provided fundamental work on the development of animals. His contributions are most well known to protozoa research.

Hertwig, on the basis of examining sea urchins, discovered and explained the zygote fertilization process for the first time correctly as a fusion of egg and spermatozoon (sperm cell) penetrating the egg membrane.

== Publications ==
- Das Nervensystem und die Sinnesorgane der Medusen, 1878 ("The nervous system and the sensory organs of the Medusa").
- Die Actinien, 1879.
- Chätognathien, 1880.
- Die Coelomtheorie: Versuch einer Erklärung des mittleren Keimblattes, Jena, 1881 ("The Coelom Theory. Attempt of an explanation of the middle Keimblatt").
- Lehrbuch der Zoologie, Jena, 1891 ("Textbook of Zoology"). (Digital edition from 1907 by the University and State Library Düsseldorf)
- Abstammungslehre und neuere Biologie, 1927 ("Descending teachings and newer biology").
