= Salsbury Cove, Maine =

- Village
- Location within Maine
- Coordinates: 44°25′50″N 68°17′01″W
- Country: United States
- State: Maine
- County: Hancock
- Town: Bar Harbor
- Elevation: 26 ft (7.9 m)
- Time zone: UTC-5 (Eastern (EST))
  - Summer (DST): UTC-4 (EDT)
- ZIP code: 04672
- Area code: 207
- GNIS feature ID: 574787

Salsbury Cove is an unincorporated village in the town of Bar Harbor, Hancock County, Maine, United States. It is on Mount Desert Island. The community is located along Maine State Route 3, 10.3 miles (16.6 km) southeast of Ellsworth. Salsbury Cove has a post office with ZIP code 04672.

Salsbury Cove is sometimes written as "Salisbury Cove".

The MDI Biological Laboratory is in Salsbury Cove.
