= Novozymes Prize =

Annual scientific award

The Novonesis Biotechnology Prize (formerly known as The Novozymes Prize before Novozymes merged with Chr. Hansen to form Novonesis) is an annual scientific award that aims to recognise outstanding contributions to the advancement of science within the fields of biotechnology and bioinnovation.

== Background ==
The Novonesis Biotechnology Prize is sponsored by the Novo Nordisk Foundation, and acknowledges exceptional European research or technological achievements that contribute to the advancement of innovative and sustainable solutions in biotechnology, benefiting both humanity and the environment. The name originates from the Danish biotechnology company Novonesis, specialising in enzyme production.

The foundation, associated with Novonesis, a global leader in biotechnological solutions and enzyme production, promotes initiatives that drive progress in science and sustainability.

=== Nomination ===
The prize is awarded to individuals or research groups whose work has demonstrated significant impact and innovation in areas such as enzyme technology, industrial biotechnology, and sustainable solutions. Recipients of the prize are selected through a nomination and evaluation process by a committee composed of experts in relevant scientific disciplines.

=== Award ===
The prize consists of a monetary award and a commemorative medal. The recipient(s) are invited to deliver a lecture or presentation on their research during a ceremony held in conjunction with the award announcement.

== Recipients ==
List of recipients of the prize over the years:

Year	Recipient
2026	Vincent Eijsink
2025	Julia Vorholdt
2024	Jack Pronk
2023	Anne Osbourn
2022	Mark van Loosdrecht
2021	Peer Bork
2020	Detlef Weigel
2019	Dame Carol Robinson
2018	Gunnar Von Heijne
2017	Emmanuelle Charpentier
2017	Virginijus Siksnys
2016	Jens Nielsen
2015	Bernard Henrissat
