= Kasim Kutay =

Egyptian-born British businessman (born 1965)

- Born: 13 May 1965 (age 61); Alexandria, Egypt
- Citizenship: British
- Education: London School of Economics (BSc, MSc)
- Employers: Morgan Stanley (1989–2007); Sun Group (2007–2009); Moelis & Company (2009–2016); Novo Holdings (2016–present)
- Title: CEO of Novo Holdings
- Board member of: Novo; Novonesis
- Spouse: Maha Arakji
- Children: 3

Kasim Kutay (born 13 May 1965) is a British fund manager who is the CEO of Danish Novo Holdings, an investment company that manages the assets of the Novo Nordisk Foundation. He holds British citizenship and resides in Denmark.

Kutay was an investment banker, focusing on the healthcare sector. He assumed the role of CEO at Novo Holdings in September 2016, following the departure of Eivind Kolding. Kutay joined Novo after more than two decades working in investment banking.

== Early life ==
Kutay was born in Alexandria, Egypt, on 13 May 1965 to a Turkish father and Syrian mother.

The family moved to Lebanon and remained there until the Lebanese Civil War broke out in 1975, when they relocated to London, United Kingdom.

Kutay attended the American Community School in London. He studied at the London School of Economics and Political Science (LSE), where he earned a BSc in economics and an MSc in politics of the world economy.

== Career ==
=== Investment banking ===
Kutay began his career as a graduate trainee at Morgan Stanley in 1989, and spent 18 years there advising mainly healthcare companies. He rose to chairman of its European healthcare group.

Kutay then worked at the US investment firm Sun Group, before joining Moelis & Company in 2009. He worked at Moelis for seven years as co-head of Europe and a member of its management committee.

=== Novo Holdings ===
Kutay was appointed CEO of Novo Holdings in June 2016, succeeding Eivind Kolding, and took up the role in September 2016. Before becoming CEO, he had advised Novo for a number of years on disposals and acquisitions, as well as other Danish healthcare companies including William Demant and Lundbeck.

Novo Holdings had total assets under management of DKK 694 billion (approximately US$109 billion) as of year-end 2025.

== Board memberships and affiliations ==
- Kutay is a member of the board of directors of Novo and Novonesis (formerly Novozymes).
- He served on the supervisory board of Evotec SE from 2020 until his resignation in June 2022, and was a non-executive director of Convatec from 2017 to July 2018.
- Kutay is co-chair of the development board of the Chelsea and Westminster NHS Foundation Trust.

== Public advocacy and commentary ==
- Kutay has written on the need for greater investment and policy measures to address antimicrobial resistance. In a 2020 opinion article co-authored with Eli Lilly chief executive David Ricks, he argued for changes to the market for antibiotics. In 2018, Novo Holdings established the REPAIR Impact Fund, a US$165 million fund focused on companies researching new antibiotics.
- Kutay has also advocated for wider adoption of biotechnology in industry and agriculture as part of the green transition, and for faster bioindustrial approval processes in Europe.
- He has written on the role of capital markets in supporting a "stakeholder" model of corporate governance, including restraints on certain hostile mergers and acquisitions.
- Kutay has supported the launch of Best For You, a model of care for adolescent mental health based at Chelsea and Westminster Hospital.

== Awards and honours ==
- In 2025, Kutay received PwC Denmark's Business Executive of the Year award.
- In April 2026, he was appointed a Knight of the Order of the Dannebrog by King Frederik X, in recognition of his contribution to Danish industry and society.

== Personal life ==
Kutay resides in Denmark and is married to architect Maha Arakji Kutay. They have three children.
