= Novo Holdings =

Danish holding company

Novo Holdings A/S
- Type: Private
- Industry: Life sciences; Asset management
- Founded: 1999; 27 years ago
- Headquarters: Hellerup, Greater Copenhagen, Denmark
- Key people: Kasim Kutay (CEO); Lars Green (Chairman)
- Total assets: DKK 694 billion (2025); Approx. €93 billion (2025)
- Subsidiaries: Novo; Novonesis
- Website: novoholdings.com

Novo Holdings A/S (formerly Novo A/S) is the Novo Nordisk Foundation's wholly owned holding company for Novo (formerly Novo Nordisk) and Novonesis (formerly Novozymes).

Novo Holdings was established in 1999 and manages the Novo Nordisk Foundation's assets, which by the end of 2025 were worth DKK 694 billion (€93 billion).

The company generated total income and investment return of DKK 21 billion in 2025, following DKK 60 billion (€8.0 billion) in 2024 and DKK 31 billion (€4.2 billion) in 2023.

Total assets under management fell from DKK 1,060 billion at year-end 2024 to DKK 694 billion at year-end 2025, mainly reflecting a lower market value of Novo Holdings' stake in Novo following a sharp decline in the pharmaceutical company's share price during 2025.

By the end of 2025, Novo Holdings had more than 170 companies in its investment portfolio.

It is one of the largest charitable foundations in the world making Novo Holdings a world-leading life sciences investor. Novo Holdings is headquartered in Copenhagen, Denmark, with offices in San Francisco, Boston and Singapore.

Eivind Kolding succeeded Henrik Gürtler as CEO in May 2014. Kolding left Novo Holdings in March 2016 and Kasim Kutay took over as CEO.

== Purpose ==
Novo Holdings manages the Novo Nordisk Foundation's assets, aiming to enable and make a positive impact on health, science and society by generating long-term returns on the assets of the Novo Nordisk Foundation, which the Novo Nordisk Foundation in return can award as grants for scientific research and humanitarian and social purposes.

The overall purpose of Novo Holdings is to hold the position as the controlling majority shareholder of the Novo Group companies (Novo and Novonesis), aiming at making a positive impact on health, science and society by generating long-term returns on the assets of the Novo Nordisk Foundation. The Novo Nordisk Foundation is an enterprise foundation which is a self-governing entity with no owners, focusing on long-term ownership of the Novo Group (Novo and Novonesis) while combining business and philanthropy within scientific, humanitarian and social purposes. A key task of Novo Holdings is to act as a stable basis for the commercial activities of Novo and Novonesis. Novo Holdings also invests in both financial assets and in companies with application-oriented research in the life sciences.

=== Objectives ===
Novo Holdings' objective is to grow the assets of the Novo Nordisk Foundation. In addition to investing in equity and fixed income securities, Novo Holdings pursues direct investments in life science companies. The Novo Nordisk Foundations share of financial returns generated from investments are added to the Novo Nordisk Foundation endowment and later distributed through charitable grants and awards aiming to improve the lives of people, science and society around the world.

Novo Holdings is recognised as a leading international life science investor. Besides being the controlling shareholder in the Novo Group companies (including Novo and Novonesis), Novo Holdings also provides seed and venture capital to companies in the development stage.

Novo Holdings also takes ownership stakes in established companies and manages a diversified portfolio of financial assets.

=== Increased focus on industrial Biosolutions ===
In 2021–2022, Novo Holdings have announced an increased investment focusing on Biosolutions (also known under the term bioindustrials or biotechnologies within the healthcare and environmental spaces), aiming to make biotechnology a spearhead for the green transition. Novo Holdings claim that the ambition is "to help remove the roadblocks wherever they are, paving the way for promising biologic discoveries to become new solutions".

In 2021, Novo Holdings added numerous biotechnology companies to its portfolio, including 21st. BIO, which helps other biotechnology companies scale up production through an advanced technology platform.

These diverse investments include companies supplying climate-neutral cement, biopesticides, synthetic silk biopolymers and many other products and solutions that challenge current conventions. Novo Holdings added eight bioindustrial companies to its portfolio in 2021 and invested approx. €98 million ($97.35 million) in total in the bioindustrial space.

=== Investment profile ===
In 2021, the Novo Holdings portfolio focusing on Life Science Investment (Novo Seeds, Novo Growth, Novo Ventures and Novo Principal Investments) made up 52% of the total portfolio while the Novo Capital Investors made up the remaining 48% of the total portfolio. The Life Science Investment portfolio and Novo Capital Investors generated returns of approximately DKK 12 billion ($1.6 billion) in 2021.

- Novo Holdings' most common sectors for investment are life sciences (38%) and diversified (13%).
- Novo Holdings' most common investment types are secondary buyouts (75%) and recapitalisation (13%).
- Novo Holdings has invested in three US states and five different countries.
- Novo Holdings' most common type of exit is secondary buyout (100%).
- Novo Holdings' largest (disclosed) investment was in 2013; the acquisition of Xellia Pharmaceuticals for $700 million.
- Novo Holdings' largest (disclosed) exit was in 2021 when Unchained Labs was sold to The Carlyle Group for $435 million.

== Novo Group ==
The Novo Group comprises Novo Holdings, Novo and Novonesis (formerly Novozymes). Novo Holdings owns more than 25% of the ordinary share capital of Novo and controls more than 70% of the votes through its ownership of all the preferred (A) shares, which are not traded.

The Group's main purpose is to manage the financial assets of the Novo Nordisk Foundation to ensure an adequate financial return to cover the Foundation's investments and grants for scientific, humanitarian and social purposes and projects in the Nordic countries and the rest of the world. The Group achieves this by investing in life science companies in Europe and North America. The Novo Group also invests in a portfolio of financial assets.

== Senior management ==
In 2014, Henrik Gürtler stepped down as CEO after working in the position since the company was established in 1999. He was replaced by Eivind Kolding, previously the CEO of Danske Bank. In February 2016, Eivind Kolding was dismissed as CEO of Novo Holdings after two years in post. He was temporarily replaced until June 2016 by chairman Sten Scheibye. His successor as CEO of Novo Holdings is Kasim Kutay, a British citizen who previously worked for investment banks Morgan Stanley and Moelis & Company.

- Kasim Kutay (CEO), 2016 – current
- Sten Scheibye (chairman and interim CEO), March 2016 – June 2018
- Eivind Kolding, 2014 – 2016
- Henrik Gürtler, 1999 – 2014

== Board of directors ==
The board of directors of Novo Holdings has nine members and oversees the company’s strategy, major investments and overall risk management. In October 2025 Novo Holdings announced that Lars Green would become chair of the board taking over from Lars Rebien Sørensen (Chair since July 2018) and that Britt Meelby Jensen would assume the role of vice chair, with the changes taking effect in November 2025.

As of 2025, the board members are:

- Lars Green (Chairman)
- Britt Meelby Jensen (Vice Chairman)
- Steen Riisgaard
- Jun Sung Kim
- N. P. "Narv" Narvekar
- Torsten Sløk
- Francis Cuss
- Viviane Monges
- Susanne Schaffert

== REPAIR Impact Fund ==
In February 2018, Novo Holdings announces the establishment of an impact fund commissioned by the Novo Nordisk Foundation with a total initial budget of US$165 million to invest in companies involved in discovering and early-stage development of therapies to combat antimicrobial resistance.

According to CEO Kasim Kutay, Novo Holdings are looking to increase this type of investments in global healthcare challenges: "We are looking to increase investments of this type in the coming years, and we are excited about our potential to make a significant difference in improving global healthcare".

REPAIR is an acronym for: Replenishing and Enabling the Pipeline for Anti-Infective Resistance.

== Investments ==
In addition to the Novo Group, Novo Holdings owns major stakes in several Danish companies, including the Xellia Group, Sonion and Chr. Hansen Holdings. By the beginning of 2018 Novo Holdings had a portfolio of 85 listed and unlisted Life Science companies in Europe and North America.

Novo Holdings invests mainly in companies that develop, manufacture or sell medicine, new treatment methods or medical or health-related equipment.

At the end of 2017, Novo Holdings had allocated nearly DKK 38 billion for investment in portfolios in Large Investments, Ventures and Seeds of DKK 31.5 billion, DKK 5.9 billion and DKK 291 million, respectively.

- In April 2021, Novo Holdings made its first investment in an Asia-based company, Halodoc.
- In May 2013, Novo Holdings acquired all shares in the pharmaceutical company Xellia.
- In July 2014, Novo Holdings acquired all shares in Sonion, a manufacturer of components for the hearing aid industry.
- In March 2017, Novo Holdings acquired 20 percent of the shares in the UK listed company Convatec with Kasim Kutay, CEO of Novo Holdings, joining the Board of Directors.
- In February 2024, Novo Holdings agreed to acquire Catalent for $16.5 billion. On completion, Novo would acquire three manufacturing facilities from parent Novo Holdings for $11 billion to scale up production to meet the demand of its obesity and diabetes drugs Wegovy and Ozempic respectively.
- In December 2024, Novo Holdngs sealed its $16.5 billion deal for Catalent with its aims to boost supplies of widely popular weight-loss drug Wegovy. This investment will allow Novo Nordisk to take control of three fill-finish facilities of the contract drug manufacturer in Italy, Belgium, and the U.S.

== Financial performance ==
=== Investment return ===
Novo Holdings reported total income and investment return of DKK 21 billion in 2025, following DKK 60 billion in 2024 and DKK 31 billion in 2023. The figures below show total income and investment return for each year.

- 2025: DKK 21 billion.
- 2024: DKK 60 billion.
- 2023: DKK 31 billion.
- 2022: DKK 3 billion.
- 2021: DKK 38 billion.
- 2020: DKK 29 billion.
- 2019: DKK 26 billion.

=== Net profit ===
Net profit for the year amounted to DKK 17 billion in 2025, compared with DKK 53 billion in 2024 and DKK 25 billion in 2023.

- 2025: DKK 17 billion.
- 2024: DKK 53 billion.
- 2023: DKK 25 billion.
- 2022: DKK 7 billion.
- 2021: DKK 33 billion.
- 2020: DKK 25 billion.
