= Mads Krogsgaard Thomsen =

Danish businessperson

- Born: December 27, 1960 (age 65)
- Citizenship: Danish
- Education: DVM, PhD and DSc
- Employer: Novo Nordisk Foundation
- Title: CEO of Novo Nordisk Foundation
- Board member of: Technical University of Denmark (DTU), University of Copenhagen
- Honours: 2022: Knight of Order of the Dannebrog; 2024: Golden Plate Award by The American Academy of Achievement

Mads Krogsgaard Thomsen (born December 27, 1960) is a Danish businessman who is the CEO of the Novo Nordisk Foundation and former executive vice president of research & development (R&D), head of R&D and chief scientific officer at the pharmaceutical company Novo.

== Education and background ==
Thomsen went to boarding school in Epsom, Surrey in Great Britain from 1967 to 1971. He graduated from high school from Rungsted Statsskole in 1979. He holds a master's degree from The Royal Veterinary and Agricultural University in 1986, now part of the University of Copenhagen. According to Krogsgaard Thomsen himself, he originally wanted to be a practicing veterinarian, and was inspired by the British television series All Creatures Great And Small. At the Royal Veterinary and Agricultural University, however, he started to take an interest in pursuing a career in either science or the pharmaceutical industry. He finished his PhD. from the same university in 1989 and obtained the DSc. (Doctor of Science) degree within the pharmacology of experimental therapeutics in 1991.

== Career ==
Thomsen worked as a pharmacologist at Leo Pharma from 1989 to 1991 and was thereafter employed by Novo in as head of Growth Hormone Research. He became senior vice president for diabetes R&D in 1994 and was appointed senior vice president of Health Care Discovery in 1995.

In November 2000, he was appointed executive vice president of Global R&D and chief scientific officer (CSO). As chief scientific officer, he was responsible for the research and development of 20 medicine products within diabetes, obesity and biopharmaceuticals. He led the development of GLP-1 therapies that today are among the leading treatments within type 2 diabetes and obesity. He left the position as executive vice president of R&D on February 28, 2021, and took the role as CEO of the Novo Nordisk Foundation on March 1, 2021.

He has been the president of the Danish Academy of Technical Sciences and has been on the board of directors at the Technical University of Denmark (DTU) and University of Copenhagen. From 2017 to 2020, Thomsen was the chairman of the board of directors at University of Copenhagen. Mads Krogsgaard Thomsen received the royal decoration of Knight of the Order of the Dannebrog by the Danish Royal House on 12 December 2022.

In 2024, Thomsen received the Golden Plate Award of the American Academy of Achievement, presented by Awards Council member Robert S. Langer.

=== Novo ===
Thomsen joined Novo in 1991 as the head of growth hormone research. In 1994, he was appointed senior vice president of diabetes research & development. In November 2000, he became executive vice president and chief scientific officer, overseeing global operations related to drug and device research, chemistry, manufacturing and controls (CMC), global development, medical affairs, regulatory affairs, and safety. During his tenure, more than 20 pharmaceutical products were developed and approved.

==== Development of GLP-1-based therapies ====
During his tenure as chief scientific officer at Novo, Thomsen played a significant role in the development of GLP-1-based therapies, including Ozempic and Wegovy. In the early 1990s, despite skepticism from company leadership regarding the potential of obesity treatments, Thomsen advocated for focusing on obesity as a significant health issue. This strategic direction led to the development of Ozempic, approved for Type 2 diabetes treatment in 2017, and Wegovy, approved for weight loss in 2021. Both medications are based on semaglutide, a GLP-1 receptor agonist designed to regulate blood sugar levels and appetite.

=== Novo Nordisk Foundation ===
On March 1, 2021, Thomsen was appointed CEO of the Novo Nordisk Foundation, a philanthropic organization that funds research in health, life sciences, and sustainability.

== Academic and scientific contributions ==
Thomsen has been an adjunct professor at the Royal Veterinary and Agricultural University (now the Faculty of Health and Medical Sciences at the University of Copenhagen) since 2000. He has also served on the editorial boards of various international peer-reviewed journals and has published extensively in the fields of pharmacology, immunology, endocrinology, and haemostasis.

List of publications associated to Mads Krogsgaard Thomsen:

Year	Publication	Authors
1989	Biological variation in random and leukotriene B4-directed migration of canine neutrophils	M.Krogsgaard Thomsen, H Strøm
1989	Histopathological Changes in Canine Allergic Contact Dermatitis Patch Test Reactions: A study on spontaneously hypersensitive dogs	Mads Krogsgaard Thomsen, Henrik Klem Thomsen
1989	Inhibition by the LTD4 antagonist, SR2640, of effects of LTD4 on canine polymorphonuclear leukocyte functions	Mads Krogsgaard Thomsen, Ian Ahnfelt-Rønne
1990	Effect of proinflammatory mediators on canine neutrophil migration and aggregation	H Strøm, M.K. Thomsen
1990	Effects of non-steroidal anti-inflammatory drugs on canine neutrophil chemotaxis	H Strøm, M. Krogsgaard Thomsen
1990	LTD4 increases cytosolic free calcium and inositol phosphates in human neutrophils: inhibition by the novel LTD4 receptor antagonist, SR2640, and possible relation to modulation of chemotaxis	Pierre Bouchelouche, Ian Ahnfelt-Rønne, M K Thomsen
1990	Is interleukin-1 alpha a direct activator of neutrophil migration and phagocytosis in the dog?	M K Thomsen
1990	Effects of etodolac, indomethacin and sodium salicylate on canine neutrophil function	M K Thomsen, Tine Skak-Nielsen, Ian Ahnfelt-Rønne
1991	Purification and Characterization of Hepatic Microsomal Cytochrome P-450 in Phenobarbital- and β-Naphthoflavone-Treated Pigs	Mads Krogsgaard Thomsen, Christian Friis, Poul Nielsen
1991	Impairment of Neutrophil Functions in a Dog with an Eosinophilic DermatosisHœmmet granulocytfunktion hos en hund med en eosinofil dermatose	M. Krogsgaard Thomsen, A. Lundorff Jensen, E. Bindseil, F. Kristensen
1991	Reassessment of two Boyden chamber methods for measuring canine neutrophil migration: the leading front and the lower surface count assays	Mads Krogsgaard Thomsen, Asger L Jensen
1991	Substance P: a neurogenic mediator of acute cellular inflammation in the dog?	M. Krogsgaard Thomsen
1991	The role of neutrophil-activating mediators in canine healthand disease (with special reference to the role of leukotrienes in inflammatory dermatoses)	M. Krogsgaard Thomsen
1991	1,25(OH)2-D3 is a potent regulator of interleukin-1 induced interleukin-8 expression and production	Christian Gronhoj Larsen, Mette Deleuran Kirsten Paludan, Bent Deleuran, Mads K. Thomsen, Claus Zachariae, Knud Kragballe Kouji Matsushima, Kristian Thestrup-Pedersen
1991	Enhanced granulocyte function in a case of chronic granulocytic leukemia in a dog	Mads K. Thomsen, Asger L Jensen, Tine Skak-Nielsen, Flemming Kristensen
1991	Effect of the leukotriene LTD4 LTE4 antagonist, SR 2640, in ulcerative colitis: An open clinical study	Ole Haagen Nielsen, Ian Ahnfelt-Rønne, M K Thomsen, A-M. Kissmeyer, Ebbe Langholz
1991	Inhibition of Leukotriene Biosynthesis and Polymorphonuclear Leukocyte Functions by Orally Active Quinolylmethoxyphenylamines	Dorte Kirstein, Mads Krogsgaard Thomsen, Ian Ahnfelt-Rønne
1991	Recombinant Human Interleukin-8 Is a Potent Activator of Canine Neutrophil Aggregation, Migration, and Leukotriene B4 Biosynthesis	M. Krogsgaard Thomsen, Christian Gronhoj Larsen, H. Kiem Thomsen, D Kirstein, Tine Skak-Nielsen, Ian Ahnfelt-Rønne, K Thestrup-Pedersen
1991	[Leukotrienes. A review of the significance for disease in man and the possibilities for therapeutic intervention]	M K Thomsen, Ian Ahnfelt-Rønne
1991	Impairment of neutrophil functions in a dog with an eosinophilic dermatosis	M K Thomsen, Asger L Jensen, E Bindseil, F Kristensen
1991	Effects of interleukin-1α on migration of canine neutrophils in vitro and in vivo	Mads Krogsgaard Thomsen, Henrik Klem Thomsen
1993	Pharmacokinetics of Recombinant Factor VIIa in the Rat – A Comparison of Bio-, Immuno- and Isotope Assays	Mads Krogsgaard Thomsen, Viggo Diness, Povl Nilsson, Søren Nørgaard Rasmussen, Tammie Taylor, Ulla Hedner
1993	Accumulation of the Recombinant Factor VIIa in Rat Bone: Importance of the Gla‐Domain and Relevance to Factor IX, another Vitamin K‐Dependent Clotting Factor	Mads Krogsgaard Thomsen, Peter Wildgoose, Povl Nilsson, Ulla Hedner
1993	Distribution of the Recombinant Coagulation Factor 125I-rFVIIa in Rats	Tammie Taylor, M K Thomsen
1993	A note on the effect of sulphidopeptide leukotrienes on granulocytes in asthma	M. Krogsgaard Thomsen, Ian Ahnfelt-Rønne
1993	ETH615, a synthetic inhibitor of leukotriene biosynthesis and function, also inhibits the production of and biological responses toward interleukin-8	Mette Deleuran, Tan Jinquan, Mads K. Thomsen, Claus Zachariae, Kirsten Paludan, Ian Ahnfelt-Rønne, Kouki Matsushima, Kristian Thestrup-Pedersen, Christian Gronhoj Larsen
1993	Polymorphonuclear neutrophil granulocyte chemotactic hyperresponsiveness in a case of canine acromegaly	Asger L Jensen, Mads Krogsgaard Thomsen, Helle Aaes Margit Andreasen, Jan Søndergaard
1994	Pharmacological Characterization of a Biosynthetic Trisulfide‐Containing Hydrophobic Derivative of Human Growth Hormone: Comparison with Standard 22 K Growth Hormone	Mads Krogsgaard Thomsen, Birgit Sehested Hansen, Povl Nilsson Jette Nowak, Peter B Johansen, Preben Damsgaard Thomsen, Jesper Christiansen
1994	Studies on the Renal Kinetics of Growth Hormone (GH) and on the GH Receptor and Related Effects in Animals	M Krogsgaard Thomsen, C Friis, B Sehested Hansen, Peter B Johansen, C Eschen, J Nowak, K Poulsen
1995	The delayed-type hypersensitivity reaction is dependent on IL-8. Inhibition of a tuberculin skin reaction by an anti-IL-8 monoclonal antibody.	Christian Gronhoj Larsen, M K Thomsen, Borbala Gesser, P D Thomsen, Bent Deleuran, J Nowak, V Skødt, H K Thomsen, Mette Deleuran, K Thestrup-Pedersen
1996	Effects of heparin and aminoguanidine on glomerular basement membrane thickening in diabetic rats	Peter Oturai, R Rasch, E Hasselager, Peter B Johansen, H Yokoyama, M K Thomsen, Bjarne Myrup, Allan kofoed-enevoldsen, T Deckert

== Awards and recognition ==
Thomsen has been recognized for his contributions to pharmaceutical research and development. His work has supported advancements in drug discovery and innovation in medical science.

- Prix Galien CEE Pro Bono Humanum Award: In November 2025, Thomsen accepted the Prix Galien CEE Pro Bono Humanum Award on behalf of the Novo Nordisk Foundation, which received the distinction for its contributions to global health initiatives and scientific research. The award was presented at the Central and Eastern Europe edition of the Prix Galien programme in Warsaw, Poland.
- PwC Business Executive of the Year 2025: In 2025, Thomsen received PwC Denmark's Business Executive of the Year award. The distinction is presented annually to executives in Danish business who have demonstrated notable leadership, strategic influence, and impact on society. PwC's award committee highlighted Thomsen's role in leading the Novo Nordisk Foundation and its expansion of scientific, global health and sustainability initiatives.
- Golden Plate Award (2024): Golden Plate Award of the American Academy of Achievement, presented by Awards Council member Robert S. Langer.
- Knight of the Order of the Dannebrog: On December 12, 2022, he was appointed as a Knight of the Order of the Dannebrog by the Danish Royal House

=== Positions of employment ===
- 1982-1985 Instructor and assistant. Associate Professor, University of Copenhagen
- 1986-1987 Clinical Department Ph.D. scholarship, University of Copenhagen
- 1987-1988 Department of Pharmacology Ph.D. scholarship, University of Copenhagen
- 1988 - 1991 Pharmacologist at LEO Pharma
- 1991 - 2000 Management positions at Novo, from 1994 as research director
  - 1991 – 1993 Head of growth hormone pharmacology, Biopharmaceuticals Division, Novo
  - 1993 – 1994 Director of pharmacology, Diabetes Care Division, Novo
  - 1994 – 1995 Senior vice president of diabetes research & development, Diabetes Care Division, Novo
  - 1995 – 1998 Corporate vice president of Drug Discovery, Novo
  - 1998 – 2000 Corporate vice president of drug discovery and preclinical development, Novo
- 2000 – 2021 Group vice president of research and development, Novo
- 2000 – adjunct professor of pharmacology, University of Copenhagen
- 2021 - CEO, Novo Nordisk Foundation

=== Board positions ===
Thomsen has held several leadership and advisory positions in academia and industry. Additionally, he has served as chairman of the Danish Biotech Research and Innovation Centre and has participated in governmental committees related to post-graduate education reforms in Denmark.

- 2000 – 2008 Member of the board of the Technical University of Denmark.
- 2000 – 2003 Member of the Academy of Technical Sciences, Denmark
- 2003 – 2004 President of the Academy of Technical Sciences, Denmark
- 2006 – 2012 Member of the board of Cellartis AB, Sweden
- 2012 – 2019 Member of the board of the University of Copenhagen (chairman from 2017 to 2020)
- 2014 - 2016 Chairman of the board, Steno Diabetes Center, Denmark
- 2018 - 2019 Board member, Symphogen A/S, Denmark
- 2020 - Member of the board of BB Biotech AG, Switzerland

== Personal life ==
Thomsen is married to Ulla. He has three children from previous marriages.
