= Novo Nordisk Prize =

Annual award for medical and health sciences

The Novo Nordisk Prize is an annual award presented to acknowledge exceptional contributions within the fields of medical and health sciences. It is specifically aimed at individuals who have demonstrated outstanding research or innovation that has the potential to advance medical science, particularly in areas related to diabetes, endocrinology, and biopharmaceutical science. The prize is administered by the Novo Nordisk Foundation, an independent Danish enterprise foundation.

== Background ==
Established by the Novo Nordisk Foundation, the prize reflects the Foundation's commitment to support health, scientific, and humanitarian efforts through research. The Foundation holds a controlling interest in the Danish pharmaceutical firm Novo Nordisk.

=== History of the Novo Nordisk Prize ===
The prize, originally DKK 50,000 (approx $7,200), was first awarded on 16 February 1963. Since then, the amount awarded has gradually increased. The prize was called the Novo Prize from 1963 until 1989, when it was renamed the Novo Nordisk Prize. Until 2020 the Prize was given for a Danish contribution. In 2020, it has been decided to change the geographical scope of the prize and from 2021 the prize is awarded for a European contribution.

== Award ==
The Novo Nordisk Prize includes a monetary award, the amount of which can vary from year to year. Alongside the financial component, recipients are also awarded a medal and a diploma in recognition of their contributions. The prize is designed not only to honour exceptional scientific work but also to support the continued research efforts of the recipients.

== Recipients of the prize ==
Award recipients
Year	Recipient(s)
2026	Francesco Muntoni
2025	Jean-Laurent Casanova
2024	David Klenerman and Shankar Balasubramanian
2023	Molly Stevens
2022	Uğur Şahin, Drew Weissman, Özlem Türeci and Katalin Karikó
2021	Marco Prinz
2020	Merete Nordentoft and Preben Bo Mortensen
2019	Hans Bisgaard
2018	Jørgen Kjems
2017	Poul Nissen
2016	Christian Torp-Pedersen
2015	Jens Bukh
2014	Søren Molin
2013	Søren K. Moestrup
2012	Erik A. Richter
2011	Peter Lawætz Andersen
2010	Henrik Clausen
2009	Søren Nielsen
2008	Kristian Helin
2007	Marja Jäättelä
2006	Henning Beck-Nielsen
2005	Mads Melbye
2004	Peter Roepstorff and Matthias Mann
2003	Jiri Bartek and Jiri Lukas
2002	Jørgen Gliemann
2001	Thue W. Schwartz
2000	Peter Aaby
1999	Bengt Saltin
1998	Michael J. Mulvany and Christian Aalkjær
1997	Peter E. Nielsen
1996	Henrik Kehlet
1995	Niels Borregaard
1994	Hans Jørgen G. Gundersen
1993	Niels E. Skakkebæk
1992	Jan Fahrenkrug and Jens Juul Holst
1991	Peter Leth Jørgensen and Arvid Maunsbach
1990	Morten Simonsen
1989	Ove B. Norén and Hans G. Sjøstrøm
1988	Gunnar Bendixen
1987	Hans H. Ussing
1986	Hans Henrik Holm
1985	Hans Klenow
1984	Staffan Magnusson
1983	Christian Crone
1982	Jens F. Rehfeld
1981	Flemming Kissmeyer-Nielsen and Arne Svejgaard
1980	Bent Friis-Hansen
1979	Gerhard Salomon
1978	Margareta Mikkelsen and Villy Posborg Petersen
1977	Erik Amdrup
1976	Niels Tygstrup
1975	Georg Mandahl-Barth
1974	Michael Schwartz
1973	K.A. Marcker
1972	J.Chr. Siim
1971	Mogens Schou
1970	Poul Astrup
1969	Erik Zeuthen
1968	Niels A. Lassen
1967	Knud Lundbæk
1966	Jørn Hess Thaysen
1965	Jens Christian Skou
1964	Claus Brun
1963	Erik Warburg
