= Peer Bork =

German bioinformatician (1963–2026)

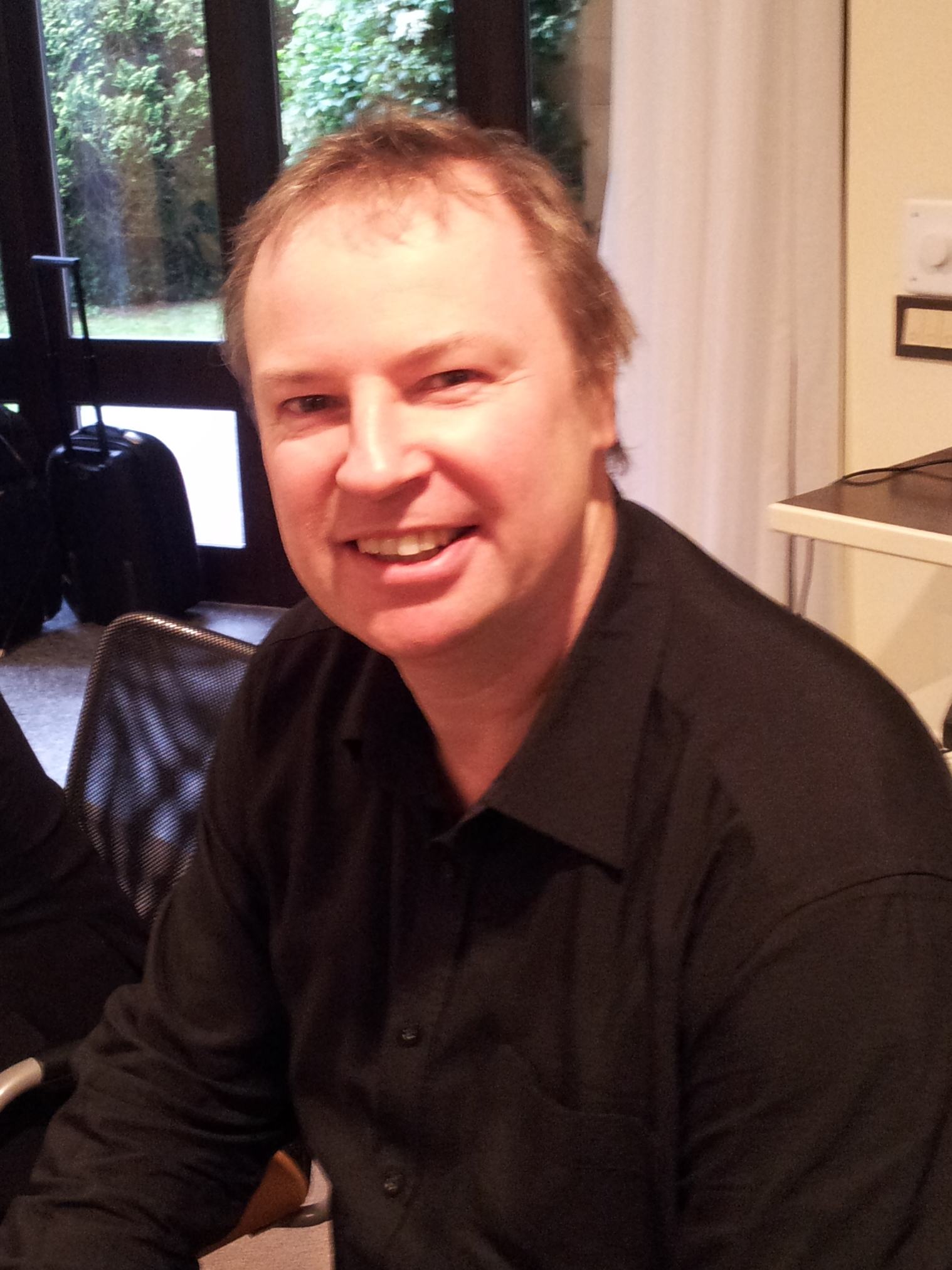
- Bork in 2013
- Born: 4 May 1963
- Died: 16 January 2026 (aged 62)
- Education: Leipzig University
- Scientific career
- Fields: Computational biology
- Workplaces: European Molecular Biology Laboratory
- Website: embl.de

Peer Bork (4 May 1963 – 16 January 2026) was a German bioinformatician. He was Interim Director General of the European Molecular Biology Laboratory (EMBL). Prior to his appointment he served as director of the EMBL site in Heidelberg, in south-west Germany.

== Life and career ==
Bork was born on 4 May 1963. He received his PhD in biochemistry in 1990 from the Leipzig University and his habilitation in theoretical biophysics in 1995 from the Humboldt University of Berlin.

Bork began his scientific career in East Germany, where he worked in the group of Jens Reich. In 1991, he joined the EMBL, where he remained affiliated for more than three decades. He was appointed a group leader at EMBL in 1995. From 2001 to 2021, Bork served as Head of EMBL's Structural and Computational Biology Unit. He was appointed Director of EMBL Heidelberg in 2020, a position he held until 2025. In March 2025, he became Interim Director General of EMBL.

Bork's research focused on computational and systems biology, including protein sequence analysis, interaction networks, drug–target interactions, and the analysis of microbial communities. His work included the development of computational methods and tools for the analysis of large biological datasets. He contributed to several large international research initiatives, including the Human Genome Project, Metagenomics of the Human Intestinal Tract (MetaHIT), and the Tara Oceans project.

He was on the board of editorial reviewers of Science, and was a senior editor of the journal Molecular Systems Biology.

In 2000, Bork was elected as a Member of the European Molecular Biology Organization, and in 2008 he received the Nature "mid-career achievement" award for science mentoring in Germany. He was appointed a member of the German National Academy of Sciences Leopoldina in 2014. He received honorary doctorates from Utrecht University in 2017 and University of Copenhagen in 2024.

In 2021, Bork was awarded the Novozymes Prize "for developing groundbreaking, publicly available and integrative bioinformatic tools" by the Novo Nordisk Foundation. He was also awarded the 2021 International Society for Computational Biology 'Accomplishments by a Senior Scientist Award' for "tremendous contributions to bioinformatics on a plethora of fronts within the field".

Bork died on 16 January 2026, at the age of 62.
