= Paul Moraviec =

British businessman

- Born: April 1958 (age 67)
- Education: Kingston University
- Occupation: Businessman
- Title: CEO, Convatec
- Term: April 2015-October 2018

Paul Moraviec (born April 1958) is a British businessman. He was the chief executive officer (CEO) of Convatec, an international medical products and technologies company, listed on the FTSE 100 Index, from April 2015 to October 2018.

== Early life ==
Moraviec has a master's degree in marketing from London's Kingston University Business School.

== Career ==
Before joining Convatec, he was vice president, neurosurgery business at Johnson & Johnson, and vice president, international commercialoperations at Abbott Laboratories.

Convatec announced that Moraviec will be retiring with immediate effect on 15 October 2018, and will be succeeded on an interim basis by non-executive director Rick Anderson, who was formerly the chairman of Johnson & Johnson.
