= OMX Copenhagen 25 =

Stock market index

The OMX Copenhagen 25 (OMXC25), formerly KFX and OMXC20) is the top-tier stock market index for Nasdaq Copenhagen, which is part of the Nasdaq Nordic, prior being replaced (as of December 2017) was known as OMX Copenhagen 20 index. It is a market value weighted index that consists of the 25 most-traded stock classes.

== Components ==
The following 25 listings make up the index as of July 2026.

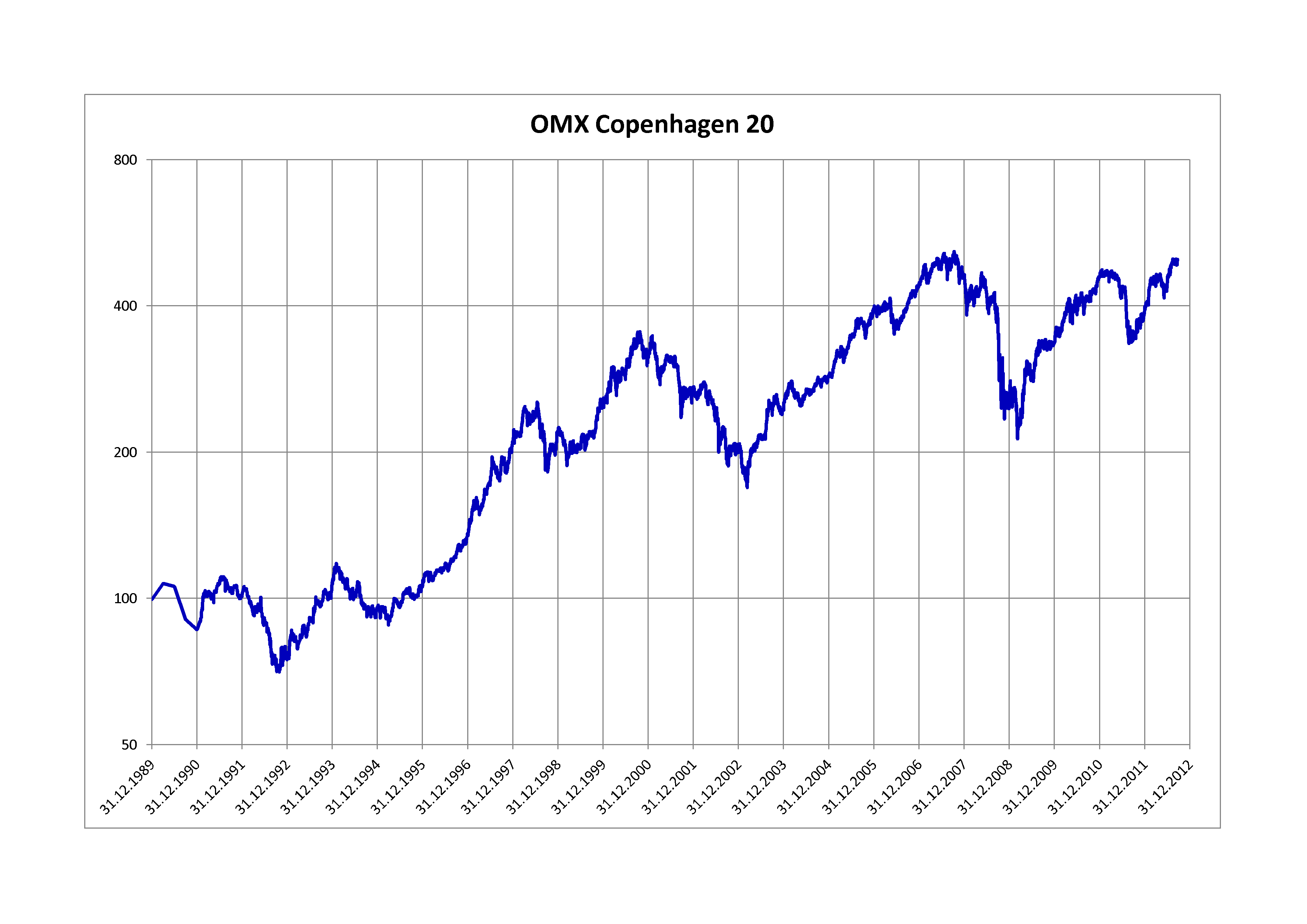
OMX Copenhagen 20 Index 1989–2012

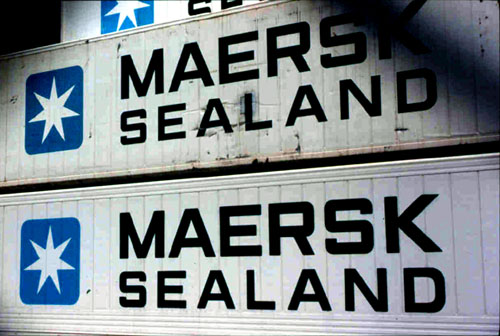
A. P. Møller-Mærsk's Sealand 40' containers.

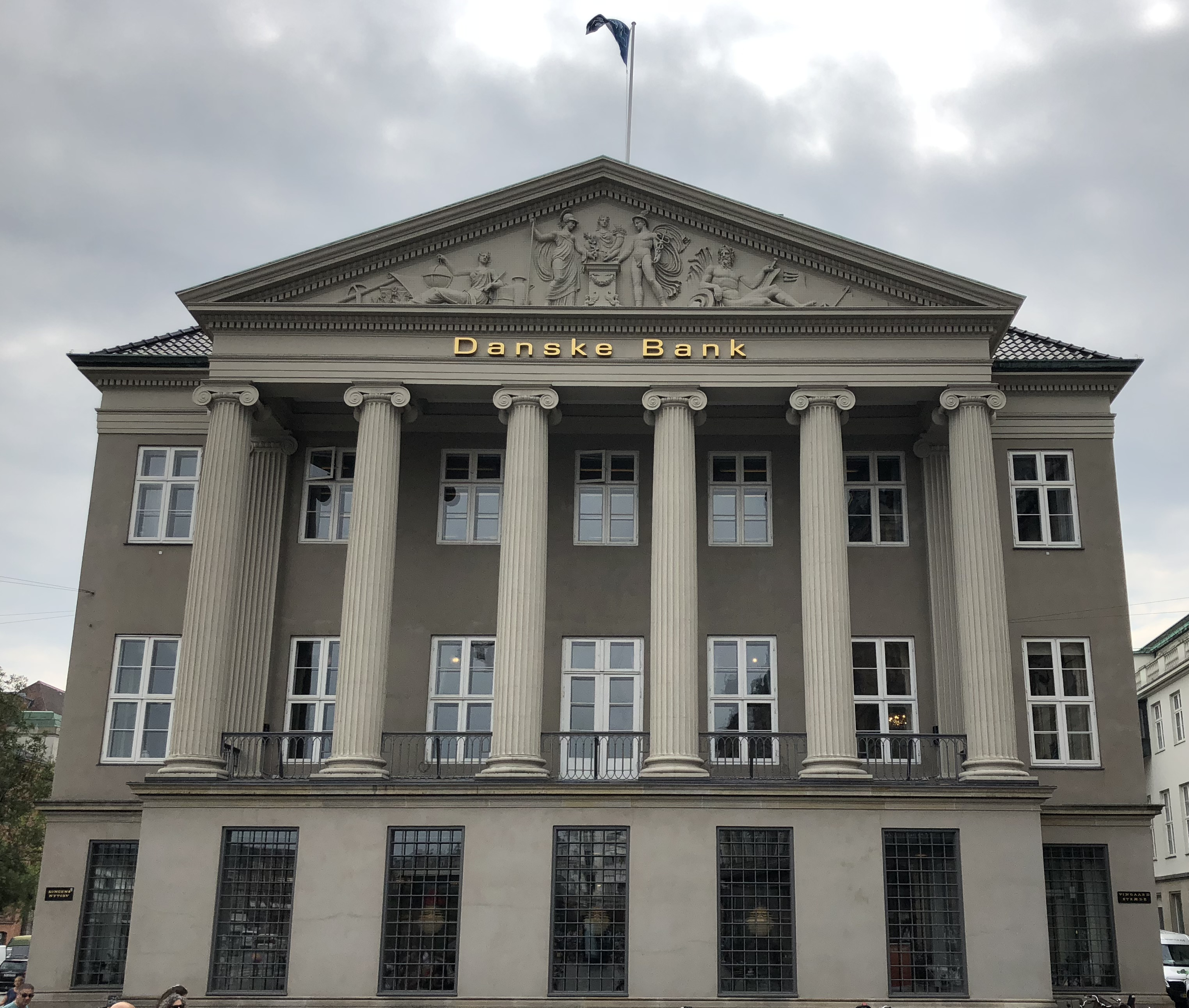
Danske Bank's headquarters in Copenhagen.

Company	ICB Sector	Ticker symbol	IPO	Founded
A.P. Møller-Mærsk (class A)	Industrial Goods and Services	MAERSK A		1904
A.P. Møller-Mærsk (class B)	Industrial Goods and Services	MAERSK B		1904
AL Sydbank	Banks	ALSYDB		1970
Ambu	Health Care	AMBU B	2004	1937
Carlsberg Group	Food, Beverage and Tobacco	CARL B		1847
Coloplast	Health Care	COLO B		1957
Danske Bank	Banks	DANSKE	2000	1871
Demant	Health Care	DEMANT	2000	1904
DSV	Industrial Goods and Services	DSV	2000	1976
FLSmidth & Co.	Construction and Materials	FLS		1882
Genmab	Health Care	GMAB	2000	1999
GN Store Nord	Health Care	GN	2000	1869
ISS	Industrial Goods and Services	ISS	2014	1901
Jyske Bank	Banks	JYSK		1967
NKT	Industrial Goods and Services	NKT	1898	1891
Nordea Bank Abp	Banks	NDA	2000	1997
Novo Nordisk	Health Care	NOVO B	2001	1923
Novonesis	Health Care	NSIS B	2024	2024
Pandora	Consumer Products and Services	PNDORA	2010	1982
Rockwool International	Construction and Materials	ROCK B		1909
Royal Unibrew	Food, Beverage and Tobacco	RBREW	2005	2005
Tryg	Insurance	TRYG	2005	2002
Vestas Wind Systems	Energy	VWS	2000	1945
Zealand Pharma	Health Care	ZEAL	2010	1998
Ørsted	Utilities	ORSTED	2006	2006

== Annual returns ==
The table shows the annual development of the OMX Copenhagen 25 calculated back to 1922.

Year	Closing level	Change in index in points	Change in index in %
1922	3.62		
1923	4.61	0.99	27.35
1924	4.22	−0.39	−8.46
1925	4.01	−0.21	−4.98
1926	3.74	−0.27	−6.73
1927	4.11	0.37	9.89
1928	3.98	−0.13	−3.16
1929	4.10	0.12	3.02
1930	3.78	−0.32	−7.80
1931	2.96	−0.82	−21.69
1932	2.90	−0.06	−2.03
1933	3.76	0.86	29.66
1934	4.13	0.37	9.84
1935	4.25	0.12	2.91
1936	4.71	0.46	10.82
1937	4.33	−0.38	−8.07
1938	4.27	−0.06	−1.39
1939	4.01	−0.26	−6.09
1940	4.01	0.00	0.00
1941	4.82	0.81	20.20
1942	4.90	0.08	1.66
1943	5.60	0.70	14.29
1944	5.43	−0.17	−3.04
1945	5.06	−0.37	−6.81
1946	5.31	0.25	4.94
1947	5.10	−0.21	−3.95
1948	4.61	−0.49	−9.61
1949	4.86	0.25	5.42
1950	5.06	0.20	4.12
1951	4.69	−0.37	−7.31
1952	4.73	0.04	0.85
1953	4.90	0.17	3.59
1954	5.23	0.33	6.73
1955	6.05	0.82	15.68
1956	7.12	1.07	17.69
1957	6.19	−0.93	−13.06
1958	7.38	1.19	19.22
1959	8.40	1.02	13.82
1960	8.47	0.07	0.83
1961	8.33	−0.14	−1.65
1962	8.54	0.21	2.52
1963	9.42	0.88	10.30
1964	9.96	0.54	5.73
1965	10.65	0.69	6.93
1966	10.30	−0.35	−3.29
1967	9.27	−1.03	−10.00
1968	10.30	1.03	11.11
1969	10.39	0.09	0.87
1970	9.36	−1.03	−9.91
1971	9.10	−0.26	−2.78
1972	17.17	8.07	88.68
1973	17.17	0.00	0.00
1974	13.52	−3.65	−21.26
1975	18.09	4.57	33.80
1976	18.09	0.00	0.00
1977	17.90	−0.19	−1.05
1978	16.81	−1.09	−6.09
1979	15.71	−1.10	−6.54
1980	17.63	1.92	12.22
1981	24.39	6.76	38.34
1982	27.40	3.01	12.34
1983	58.64	31.24	114.01
1984	45.76	−12.88	21.96
1985	65.50	19.74	43.14
1986	52.89	−12.61	−19.25
1987	49.88	−3.01	−5.69
1988	74.54	24.66	30.87
1989	99.48	24.94	33.46
1990	86.32	−13.16	−13.23
1991	96.74	10.42	12.07
1992	71.80	−24.94	−25.78
1993	100.30	28.50	39.69
1994	95.64	−4.66	−4.65
1995	106.14	10.50	10.98
1996	136.13	29.99	28.26
1997	210.55	74.42	54.67
1998	219.34	8.79	4.17
1999	255.69	36.35	16.57
2000	313.90	58.21	22.77
2001	272.45	−41.45	−13.20
2002	199.49	−72.96	−26.78
2003	244.35	44.86	22.49
2004	286.66	42.31	17.32
2005	393.52	106.86	37.28
2006	441.48	47.96	12.19
2007	464.14	22.66	5.13
2008	247.72	−216.42	−46.63
2009	336.69	88.97	35.92
2010	457.58	120.89	35.91
2011	389.95	−67.63	−14.78
2012	496.16	106.21	27.24
2013	615.50	119.34	24.05
2014	744.44	128.94	20.95
2015	1,014.17	269.73	36.23
2016	883.96	−130.21	−12.84
2017	1,024.22	140.26	15.87
2018	891.56	−132.66	−12.95
2019	1,135.79	244.23	27.39
2020	1,465.17	329.38	29.00
2021	1,863.99	398.82	27.22
2022	1,835.28	−28.71	−1.54
2023	2,283.53	448.25	24.42
2024	2,102.38	−181.15	−7.93
