= Enterprise foundation =

Foundations that own companies

Enterprise foundations are foundations that own companies.

Enterprise foundations are independent, self-governing entities with no owners. They are characterised by long time-horizons, philanthropic goals and the absence of personal profit motives. Enterprise foundations generally have philanthropic as well as business purposes, and often concentrate their investments in a single firm or a single business group. Many of the best known foundation-owned companies are publicly listed, while the enterprise foundation retains a controlling ownership position, commonly through voting rights via different share classes. Ownership can be full (100% ownership) or just a controlling influence. The companies owned by enterprise foundations may be active in any private business activity.

Other terms used to describe the same phenomenon are "industrial foundations", "corporate foundations", "commercial foundations", "business foundations", "commercial non-profits" and "foundations with corporate interests".

A defining feature of enterprise foundations is that the foundation controls the company which it owns, and not the other way around. Consequently, the majority of corporate foundations around the world, who do philanthropy on behalf of a company, are not enterprise foundations. Moreover, enterprise foundations are private entities not governmental or quasi-governmental institutions.

Several big international companies are owned by enterprise foundations, including the Indian Tata Group, the Swedish Wallenberg businesses, the Danish pharmaceutical company Novo Nordisk, US Hershey, German Robert Bosch, Swiss Rolex and IKEA. Enterprise foundations are most common in the Nordic country of Denmark, where enterprise foundations account for almost half of domestic stock market capitalisation. In Denmark, enterprise foundations own three of the four largest Danish companies; A.P. Moller – Maersk (A.P. Moller Foundation), Novo Nordisk (Novo Nordisk Foundation) and Carlsberg (Carlsberg Foundation).

== Purpose ==
Many enterprise foundations are non-profits without a personal profit motive, which sets them aside from other ownership structures. Instead, they are legally bound by their purpose, which typically is to secure the longevity and independence of the companies that they own and to contribute to society by philanthropy. As perpetuities which cannot be dissolved, they are long-term owners. However, not all enterprise foundations are equally idealistic. Some have strong ties to the founding family and continue to donate to its descendants. Others again have ties to government organisations, cooperatives or associations, which helped establish them.

== Distribution ==
In most countries around the world, enterprise foundations are not a legal category and there is no unified body of enterprise foundation law. The Nordic country of Denmark is an outlier due to its tax regime and enterprise foundation laws. Consequently, Denmark has a high number of enterprise foundations compared to other countries.

Examples of significant, international companies controlled by an enterprise foundation
Company	Country	Description and industry
Carlsberg	Denmark	Alcoholic beverages, beer and soft drinks
Novo Nordisk	Denmark	Danish multinational pharmaceutical company
Anheuser Busch Inbev	Belgium	Alcoholic beverages, beer and soft drinks
A.P. Moller – Maersk	Denmark	Global transport and logistics company
Bertelsmann	Germany	German multinational media, services and education company
Lundbeck	Denmark	Danish multinational pharmaceutical company
Robert Bosch	Germany	German conglomerate
Leo Pharma	Denmark	Danish multinational pharmaceutical company
CaixaBank	Spain	Spanish multinational financial services company
Novozymes	Denmark	Danish multinational biotech company
Carl Zeiss	Germany	German optics company
The Hershey Co.	United States	American food company
Inter IKEA Holding	Sweden	Swedish furniture manufacturer
Wallenberg	Sweden	Swedish conglomerate and business dynasty
Kavli	Norway	Norwegian food company
Kuehne + Nagel	Switzerland	Global transport and logistics company
Lloyds Register	United Kingdom	Technical and business services organisation
Mahle	Germany	German automotive parts manufacturer
DNV	Norway	Certification body and classification society
Pierre Fabre	France	French multinational pharmaceutical and cosmetics company.
Rolex	Switzerland	Swiss watch designer and manufacturer
Tata Sons	India	Indian multinational conglomerate
Wiliam Demant	Denmark	Danish multinational hearing healthcare company

== Characteristics ==
If a foundation has controlling influence in a business company, it is an enterprise foundation.

Business ownership separates enterprise foundations from ordinary (purely charitable) foundations. Self-ownership means that it has no residual claimants. The foundation may choose to donate, but nobody has a claim on donations. By foundation ownership, foundations have controlling influence in a business company. To qualify as enterprise foundations, they have to have controlling influence – enterprise foundations do not have to own 100% of the companies. The controlling influence is focused on voting rights rather than capital shares or dividend rights.

=== Types ===
- Charitable enterprise foundations: Created with a charitable goal but happen to own a controlling interest in one or more business companies.
- Pure enterprise foundations: Created with the explicit goal of running a business.
- Family enterprise foundations: Foundations created to secure and promote the wealth of the descendants and other family members of the founder(s).
- Enterprise foundations with multiple goals: Combinations of purposes so that a foundation's charter may oblige it to own a business and to contribute to charity.

=== Key characteristics ===
Academic literature has identified the following key characteristics of enterprise foundations:

- Creation by donation: an irrevocable separation from the founder. Irreversibility separates enterprise foundations from i.e. family trusts that are widely used in the US and other common law countries.
- Independence: a separate legal personality for the foundation.
- A non-selfish purpose: which goes beyond benefitting the founder.
- A foundation endowment: shares in a company or other financial assets.
- A foundation organisation: i.e., a board of directors or trustees.
- A foundation charter: Including foundation purpose and governance rules.
- Ownership: voting control of a company.
- Outside supervision: for example by a regulator to ensure that the charter and the law are respected.

== Perspectives ==
Advantages and disadvantages to enterprise foundations and foundation ownership:

Advantages (benefits, strengths)	Disadvantages (costs, weaknesses)
Long-term horizon	Muted incentives
Ownership commitment	Risk aversion
Social responsibility	Financial constraints
Philanthropy	No market for corporate control
Succession	Multiple objectives (business, philanthropy)
Company survival	Company growth

=== Key benefits of enterprise foundation structure ===
==== Long-term commitment ====
- The enterprise foundation is committed to act in accordance to the purpose(s) stated in the foundation charter – which most importantly are the longevity and independence of the company. Consequently, the enterprise foundation is legally committed to the long-term ownership of the enterprise. Purposes may include special attention to certain topics i.e. product quality, employee welfare, contributions to research, education, culture, social projects, and general charity.
- As long-term owners, enterprise foundations are less pressured by stock market fluctuations, earnings expectations, or corporate raiders.
- Enterprise foundations are able to make long-term decisions that avoid economic short-termism or opportunism.

==== Trust and goodwill ====
- Enterprise foundations may earn the trust and goodwill of customers, suppliers, employees, and other stakeholders due to its long-term commitment to philanthropy, charity, employee welfare, contributions etc. Greater trust in the company may result in greater customer loyalty, more engaged employees, more reliable suppliers, more supportive societies and more stable shareholders, which in turn generate greater revenue, lower costs and higher shareholder value.
- Enterprise foundations may experience "the mutual commitment hypothesis". Ownership commitment by enterprise foundations may facilitate organisational commitment by employees in foundation-owned firms. Company commitment to employee welfare may be stronger and more credible in foundation-owned firms due to the long-term and philanthropic nature of foundation ownership.

==== Mitigation of succession challenges ====
- Foundation ownership can mitigate the succession challenges and internal conflicts found in family-owned firms.

==== Absence of monetary motive ====
- Customers are presumably more likely to buy from a company that has less of an incentive to abuse their trust. The same goes for employees, suppliers, and other stakeholders. Since the enterprise foundation has little or no incentive to break implicit contracts, foundation-owned companies can more credibly negotiate contracts with their stakeholders.
- The idealistic purpose of an enterprise foundation can help motivate customers, employees and other stakeholders to identify with the firm.
- The key decision makers in enterprise foundations – the foundation board members – are not rewarded by economic incentives, so they may identify with the foundation and its purpose.
- Most enterprise foundations have a philanthropic purpose in addition to the business purpose. Since philanthropy is usually paid for by dividends from the company, the philanthropic purpose implies an incentive to generate profits.

=== Criticism of enterprise foundation structure ===
- The founder's substantial loss of personal wealth.
- Strong preference for survival and retaining the foundation may prevent the company from taking part in restructuring or from issuing equity to finance growth.
- The founder's administrative heritage may lead to excessive conservatism and may impede flexible adaption to new circumstances. The lack of a personal profit motive may make foundation-owned companies less agile.
- Highly profitable foundation-owned companies with philanthropic or charity purposes may fall prey to so-called "SDG-washing", claiming that their charitable actions can be interpreted as a defensive manoeuvre to shift the public focus away from their profitability. In 2016 the Danish pharmaceutical, and enterprise-foundation owned company, Novo Nordisk A/S, faced criticism in the US over its pricing of diabetes medication which fuels the growth of the Novo Nordisk Foundation's substantial endowment size.
