= Novo Nordisk Foundation Lecture Prize =

Prize for distinguished Nordic medical researchers

The Novo Nordisk Foundation Lecture Prize is an annual scientific award presented to a Nordic researcher in recognition of outstanding contributions to medical science, particularly in the field of diabetes and metabolism. The prize was established in 1979 and is awarded in conjunction with a public lecture, typically delivered at the annual meeting of the Scandinavian Society for the Study of Diabetes (SSSD).

The award includes a monetary prize, consisting of a personal award and a research grant. As of 2024, the total prize amounts to DKK 600,000, of which DKK 100,000 is a personal award and DKK 500,000 is allocated for research purposes. The award aims to foster knowledge sharing and to highlight influential scientific work within endocrinology, metabolism, and related biomedical disciplines.

Over the years, the prize has been awarded to several prominent researchers in the Nordic region. In 2024, Professor Hindrik Mulder of Lund University received the prize for his pioneering research on pancreatic islet cells and their role in type 2 diabetes. In 2022, Professor Pirjo Nuutila from the University of Turku was honored for her contributions to metabolic research using advanced imaging techniques.

Originally known as the Jacob E. Poulsen Grant, the award was renamed the Novo Nordisk Foundation Lecture Prize in 1996.
