= Carol Robinson =

British chemist and professor (born 1956)

Professor Dame Carol Robinson DBE FRS FMedSci
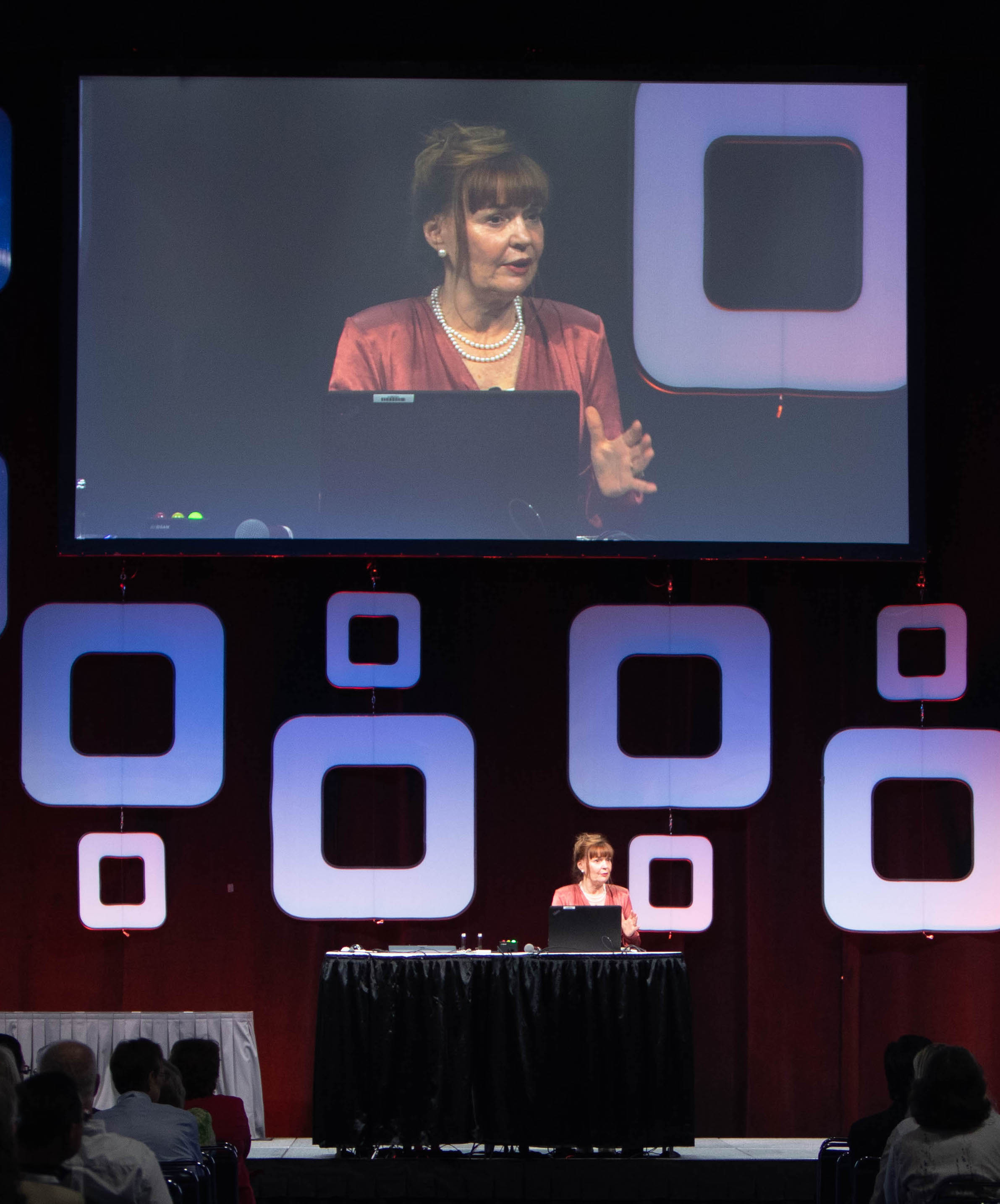
- Carol Robinson presenting John Fenn Lecture 2023
- Born: Carol Vivien Bradley; 10 April 1956 (age 70)
- Education: University of Swansea (MSc); University of Cambridge (PhD)
- Awards: Rosalind Franklin Award (2004); Davy Medal (2010); Royal Medal (2019)
- Scientific career
- Fields: Chemistry; Physical chemistry; Mass spectrometry
- Workplaces: University of Oxford; University of Cambridge; University of Bristol; Pfizer
- Thesis: Structural studies on bioactive organic compounds (1982)
- Website: www.chem.ox.ac.uk/people/dame-carol-robinson

Dame Carol Vivien Robinson DBE FRS FMedSci (born 10 April 1956) is a British chemist and former president of the Royal Society of Chemistry (2018–2020). She was a Royal Society Research Professor and is the Dr Lee's Professor of Physical and Theoretical Chemistry, and a professorial fellow at Exeter College, University of Oxford. She is the founding director of the Kavli Institute for Nanoscience Discovery, University of Oxford, and she was previously professor of mass spectrometry at the chemistry department of the University of Cambridge.

== Early life and education ==
Born in Kent, the daughter of Denis E. Bradley and Lillian (née Holder), Carol Vivien Bradley left school at 16 and began her career as a lab technician in Sandwich, Kent with Pfizer, where she began working with the then novel technique of mass spectrometry.

Her potential was spotted, and she gained further qualifications at evening classes and day release from her job at Pfizer. After earning her degree, she left Pfizer and studied for a Master of Science degree at the University of Swansea, followed by a Ph.D. at the University of Cambridge, which she completed in just two years. During this time she was a student at Churchill College, Cambridge.

== Career and research ==
After a postdoctoral training fellowship at the University of Bristol, Robinson took up a junior position in the mass spectrometry unit at the University of Oxford, where she began analysing protein folding. Robinson and colleagues successfully captured protein folding in the presence of the chaperone GroEL, demonstrating that at least some aspects of protein secondary structure could be studied in the gas phase.

Robinson was the first woman professor in the department of chemistry at both the University of Cambridge (2001) and the University of Oxford (2009). Her research demonstrated that electrospray ionization mass spectrometry could be used to study proteins and other complex macromolecules in the gas phase. In addition to her contributions to the study of protein folding, Robinson has studied ribosomes, molecular chaperones and most recently membrane proteins. Her research has made contributions to gas-phase structural biology, including the study of protein complexes in their native environments for drug discovery. Additionally, she is a co-founder of OMass Therapeutics, a University of Oxford spin-out company applying mass spectrometry technology to drug discovery.

== Honours and awards ==
Robinson was awarded the American Society for Mass Spectrometry's Biemann Medal in 2003, and the Christian B. Anfinsen Award in 2008. In 2004, the Royal Society awarded her both a Fellowship (FRS) and the Rosalind Franklin Award. Her citation for the Royal Society reads:

Distinguished for her research on the application of mass spectrometry to problems in chemical biology. She has used mass spectrometry to define the folding and binding of interacting proteins in large complexes. Most importantly, she has established that macromolecular complexes such as GroEL, ribosomes, and intact virus capsids can be generated in the gas phase and their electrospray mass spectra recorded. This work has demonstrated the power of mass spectrometry in studying very large complexes and allowed her to define changes in their conformation and the manner of their assembly.

She was elected a Fellow of the Academy of Medical Sciences in 2009.

In 2010, Robinson received the Davy Medal "for her ground-breaking and novel use of mass spectrometry for the characterisation of large protein complexes".

In 2011, she was given the Interdisciplinary Prize by the Royal Society of Chemistry for "development of a new area of research, gas-phase structural biology, using highly refined mass spectrometry techniques", the Aston Medal, and the FEBS/EMBO Women in Science Award.

She was appointed Dame Commander of the Order of the British Empire (DBE) in the 2013 New Year Honours for services to science and industry.

She received the Thomson Medal Award in 2014.

In 2015, she was a laureate of the L'Oréal-UNESCO For Women in Science Awards "for her groundbreaking work in macromolecular mass spectrometry and pioneering gas phase structural biology by probing the structure and reactivity of single proteins and protein complexes, including membrane proteins."

In 2017, she was elected a Foreign Associate of the US National Academy of Sciences.

In 2018, she won the Frank H. Field and Joe L. Franklin Award for Outstanding Achievement in Mass Spectrometry from the American Chemical Society.

In 2019, she won the Novozymes Prize for "almost single-handedly founding a subfield of mass spectrometry proteomics". Also in 2019 she received the Royal Medal.

In 2020, she was chosen as the recipient of the Othmer Gold Medal.

In 2021, she received the 2022 Louis-Jeantet Prize for Medicine. and the 2022 European Chemistry Gold Medal by the European Chemical Society. Also in 2021, she became an International Honorary Member of the American Academy of Arts and Sciences.

In 2022, she was awarded the Franklin Institute Award for Chemistry.

In 2023, she was elected to the American Philosophical Society and was awarded the John B. Fenn Award for Distinguished Contribution to Mass Spectrometry. She was named one of the top ten "Innovators and Trailbalzers" on the 2023 Power List by the Analytical Scientist.

In 2024, she received the EPO European Inventor Lifetime Achievement Award for her work in mass spectrometry that significantly advanced biochemical research and medical diagnostics. On 19 June 2024, she received an honorary doctorate from the University of Cambridge in recognition of her achievements in chemistry.

In 2024, she was inducted into the National Academy of Inventors.

She has been awarded 13 honorary doctorates including the Weizmann Institute of Science, Aarhus University Denmark, University of Kent, the University of York, and the University of Bristol.

On 10 August 2025, Robinson appeared on BBC Radio 4's Desert Island Discs.
