= Jens Nielsen =

Danish biologist

Jens Bredal Nielsen
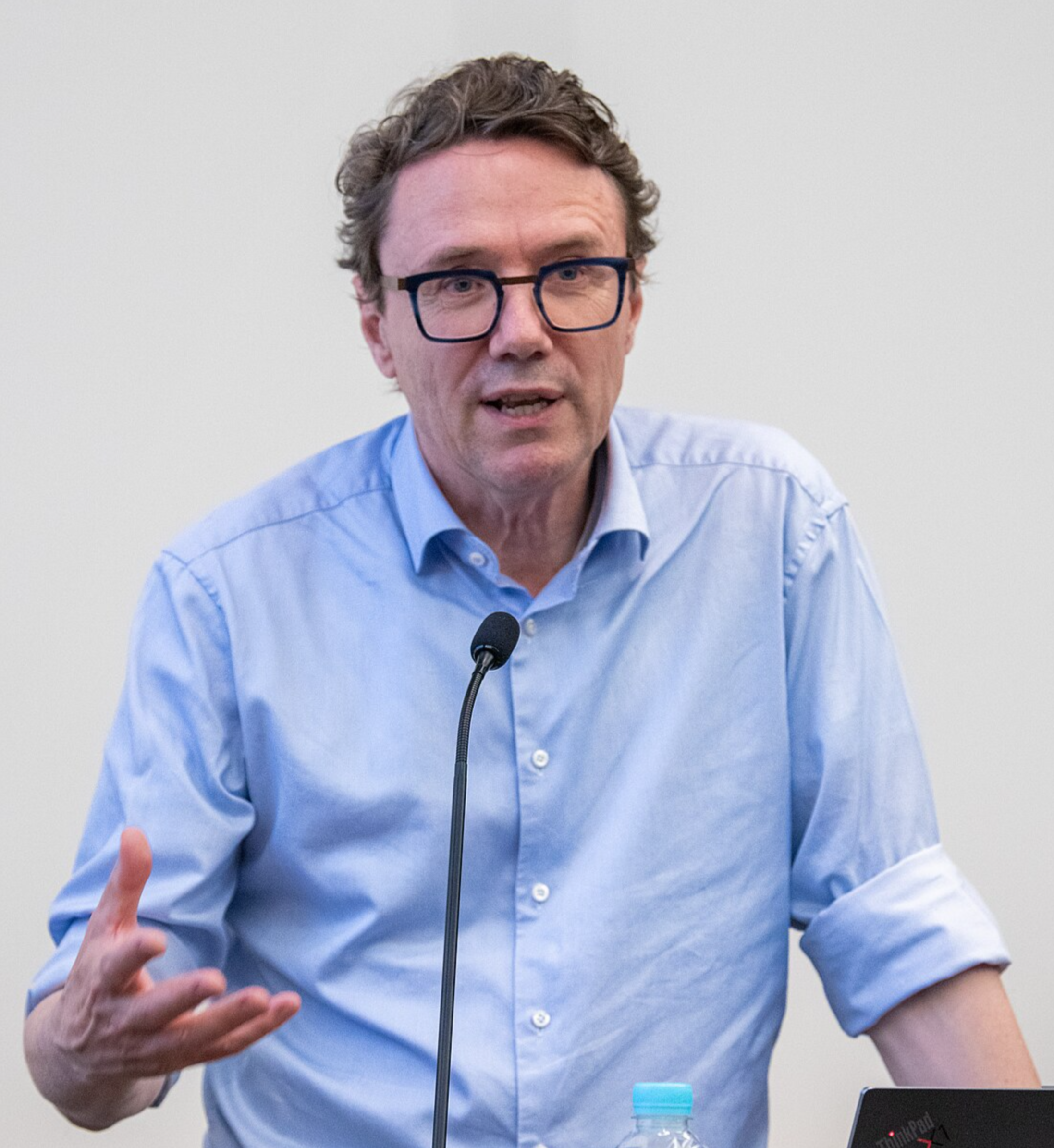
- Nielsen in 2025
- Education: Technical University of Denmark, Denmark
- Known for: Metabolic engineering, systems biology
- Awards: See Awards section
- Scientific career
- Workplaces: Chalmers University of Technology, Sweden; BioInnovation Institute, Denmark
- Doctoral advisor: John Villadsen

Jens Bredal Nielsen is the CEO of BioInnovation Institute, Copenhagen, Denmark, and professor of systems biology at Chalmers University of Technology, Gothenburg, Sweden. He is also an adjunct professor at the Danish Technical University and the University of Copenhagen. Nielsen is the most cited researcher in the field of metabolic engineering, and he is the most cited researcher in Biology and Biochemistry in Sweden and Denmark (top 5 in Europe). He is the only foreign member of all three academies in the US (Science, Engineering and Medicine) and he is also foreign member of the Chinese Academy of Engineering. He was the founding president of the International Metabolic Engineering Society. He has additionally founded several biotech companies.

== Education and academic career ==
Jens Nielsen obtained his high school degree from Horsens Statsskole in 1981, and his MSc in chemical engineering (1986) and PhD in biochemical engineering (1989) from the Danish Technical University (DTU). Following his studies, he established an independent research group at DTU and was appointed full professor there in 1998. He was Fulbright visiting professor at MIT in 1995–1996. At DTU, he founded and directed the Center for Microbial Biotechnology.

In 2008, he was recruited as professor and director at Chalmers University of Technology, Sweden, where he built a research group of more than sixty people. At Chalmers, he established the Area of Advance Life Science Engineering, a cross-departmental strategic research initiative, and was founding head of the Department of Biology and Biological Engineering, which now both encompass about 200 people. Nielsen has published over 850 research papers, co-authored more than forty books, and is the holder of more than fifty patents. He was identified by Thomson Reuters/Clarivate as a highly cited researcher in 2015–2023, and according to Google Scholar, he is the most cited researcher in metabolic engineering, industrial biotechnology, and among the top five in synthetic biology. He is co-author of several textbooks, and his textbook on bioreaction engineering principles has been published in three editions. His textbook on metabolic engineering has been translated into Chinese and Japanese.

In 2019, Nielsen was recruited as CEO of BioInnovation Institute (BII), an initiative by the Novo Nordisk Foundation to support innovation and translation of science for use in society.

== Research ==
Nielsen has been studying and engineering metabolism for close to thirty years. His work has produced natural rare molecules, antibiotics, and biofuels. He also studies metabolism in humans, with specific interest in metabolic diseases such as type 2 diabetes, obesity, cardiovascular disease, and various cancers.

=== Industrial microbiology ===
Nielsen has worked on studying and improving various industrial biotechnological processes. Initially, he worked on physiological characterization of the filamentous fungus Penicillium chrysogenum that is used for penicillin production. This resulted in continued work, together with the Dutch company DSM, on development of a novel process for production of adipoyl-7-ADCA, a precursor for cephalexin. He also worked on characterization of other fermentation processes used for antibiotics production, and through the use of his experimental and modelling techniques, he assisted several companies with improving their production processes. Nielsen has also worked on improving fermentation processes used for production of industrial enzymes, both using fungi and bacteria.

=== Metabolic engineering ===
In connection with his work on improving classical and new fermentation processes, Nielsen developed a number of experimental and computational tools that today are the foundation for metabolic engineering—the directed genetic modification of cells with the objective of improving the phenotype. He was the first to use gas-chromatography mass-spectrometry (GC-MS) as an experimental tool for measurement of C13-labelled metabolites, with the objective to perform flux analysis. Through metabolic engineering, Nielsen has developed and improved a number of biotechnological processes, such as improving ethanol production by yeast and reducing glycerol formation as a by-product; improving the temperature tolerance of yeast, which has enabled ethanol production at elevated temperatures and thereby reduced costs; production of a range of different chemicals using engineered yeast, such as resveratrol, 3-hydroxypropionic acid, human haemoglobin, fatty acid ethyl esters, short-chain fatty acids, alkanes, fatty alcohols, santalene, farnesene, coumaric acid, ornithine, and spermidine.

=== Systems biology of industrial microorganisms ===
Nielsen has pioneered the development of systems biology tools for industrial microorganisms. He has developed genome-scale metabolic models (GEMs) for many important industrial microorganisms, including yeast (Saccharomyces cerevisiae), Lactococcus lactis, Streptomyces coelicolor, Aspergillus oryzae, Aspergillus niger, Penicillium chrysogenum, and Pichia pastoris. He has also developed a number of tools for performing integrative omics analysis, and he was the first to demonstrate how transcriptome data could be integrated in the context of GEMs in order to gain insight into co-regulation. Nielsen has also developed methods for performing quantitative metabolome analysis of many microorganisms as well as being involved in genome-sequencing of several key industrial microorganisms.

=== Human metabolism ===
Using his systems biology toolbox developed for microorganisms, Nielsen initiated work on human metabolism. In connection with this, he developed a comprehensive genome-scale metabolic model for human cells and was the first to use a human GEM to illustrate the metabolic heterogeneity of cancer metabolism. His work on human metabolism has involved studies of different diseases, such as obesity, metabolic dysfunction–associated steatotic liver disease (MASLD) and metabolic dysfunction associated steatohepatitis (MASH), and hepatocellular carcinoma. Nielsen further used human GEMs to identify that combined measurements of several glycosaminoglycans can be used as a strong biomarker for clear cell renal cell carcinoma, probably the first systems biomarker.

=== Gut microbiota ===
Nielsen has used his systems biology competence to study the metabolism of the gut microbiota. He was involved in early studies on using metagenome sequencing for characterization of the gut microbiota and demonstrating that variations are associated with cardiovascular disease and type 2 diabetes. He also used his advanced metabolic modelling skills to gain further functional insight into how the gut microbiota impacts changes in plasma metabolomics in response to dietary changes.

== Awards ==
- Direktør Gorm Petersen's Mindelegat, Denmark (1989)
- Ulrik Brinch og Hustru Marie Brinch's legat, Denmark (1994)
- STVFs Jubilæumspris, Statens Teknisk Videnskabelige Forskningsråd, Denmark (1996)
- Aksel Tovborg Jensens Legat, Bjerrum-Brøndsted-Lang Lecture, Carlsberg Foundation, Denmark (2001)
- Villum Kann Rasmussen's Årslegat, Villum Kann Rasmussen Fonden, Denmark (2002)
- Merck Award for Metabolic Engineering, USA (2004)
- Amgen Biochemical Engineering Award, USA (2011)
- Nature Award for Mentoring, Nature Publishing Group, UK (2012)
- Charles D. Scott Award 2012, Symposium on Biotechnology for Fuels and Chemicals, USA (2012)
- Norblad-Exstrand Medalj, Swedish Chemical Society, Sweden (2013)
- Novozymes Prize, Novo Nordisk Foundation, Denmark (2016)
- Gaden Award, American Chemical Society, USA (2016)
- Gold Medal, Royal Swedish Academy of Engineering Sciences, Sweden (2017)
- Eric and Sheila Samson Prime Ministers Prize for Innovation in Alternative Fuels for Transportation, Fuels, and Smart Mobility Initiative, Israel (2017)
- ENI Award, Italy (2017)
- James E. Bailey Award, American Institute for Chemical Engineering, USA (2019)
- Arvid Carlssons Award, Sahlgrenska Science Park, Sweden (2019)
- Emil Chr. Hansen's Gold Medal for Microbiological Research, Denmark (2019)
- Gregory Stephanopoulos Award for Metabolic Engineering, IMES, USA (2020)
- The Chinese Government Friendship Award, China (2021)
- Julius Thomsen Gold Medal for Technical Chemistry, DTU (2023)
- Chalmers Medal, Chalmers (2023)
- China International Science and Technology Cooperation Award, China (2024)

== Academies ==
- Member of the Academy of Technical Sciences, Denmark (1997)
- Member of the Royal Swedish Academy of Engineering Sciences, Sweden (2010)
- Member of the Royal Danish Academy of Science and Letters, Denmark (2010)
- Foreign Associate of the National Academy of Engineering, USA (2010)
- College of Fellows of the American Institute for Medical and Biological Engineering, USA (2011)
- Fellow of the American Academy of Microbiology, USA (2012)
- Member of the Royal Society of Arts and Sciences in Gothenburg, Sweden (2012)
- Member of the Royal Swedish Academy of Sciences, Sweden (2014)
- Foreign member of the Chinese Academy of Engineering (2019)
- Foreign associate of the US National Academy of Sciences (2019)
- Member of the National Academy of Medicine (2023)

== Other major honors ==
- Fulbright Fellow, USA (1995)
- Sunner Memorial Lecture, Lund University, Sweden (2002)
- Hough Memorial Lecture, Birmingham University, UK (2004)
- Wallenberg Scholar, Sweden (2010)
- Honorary Professor, Beijing University of Chemical Technology, Beijing, China (2014)
- William Chalmers Lecture, Chalmers University of Technology, Sweden (2014)
- Zhang Dayu Lectureship, Dalian Institute for Chemical Physics, Chinese Academy of Sciences, China (2015)
- Ridder af Dannebrog (Knight of the order of Dannebrog), Queen Margrethe II of Denmark (2019)
- Honorary Professor, Jiangnan University, Wuxi, China (2019)
- Honorary Professor, Nankai University, Tianjin, China
- Peiyang Lectureship, Tianjin University, Tianjin, China
- Honorary Professor, Tianjin University, Tianjin, China
