= Novo Nordisk Foundation Center for Protein Research =

Danish research center

Coordinates: 55°40′47″N 12°34′21″E

The Novo Nordisk Foundation Center for Protein Research was established at the Faculty of Health and Medical Sciences at the University of Copenhagen, to promote basic and applied discovery research on human proteins of medical relevance. The establishment of the center (announced in April 2007) has been made possible by a donation of 600 million DKK (~113 MUSD) from the Novo Nordisk Foundation and through significant contributions from the University of Copenhagen for the renovation of the Center laboratories.

The Center comprises a wide range of expertise and skills within research areas of disease systems biology, proteomics, high throughput protein production and characterisation, chemical biology, disease biology, and protein therapeutics. The center also contributes to the progress of translational research within medicine and provide fundamental insights which can be used to promote drug discovery and development.
