= Pandora (jewelry) =

Danish jewellery company (1982)

Pandora A/S

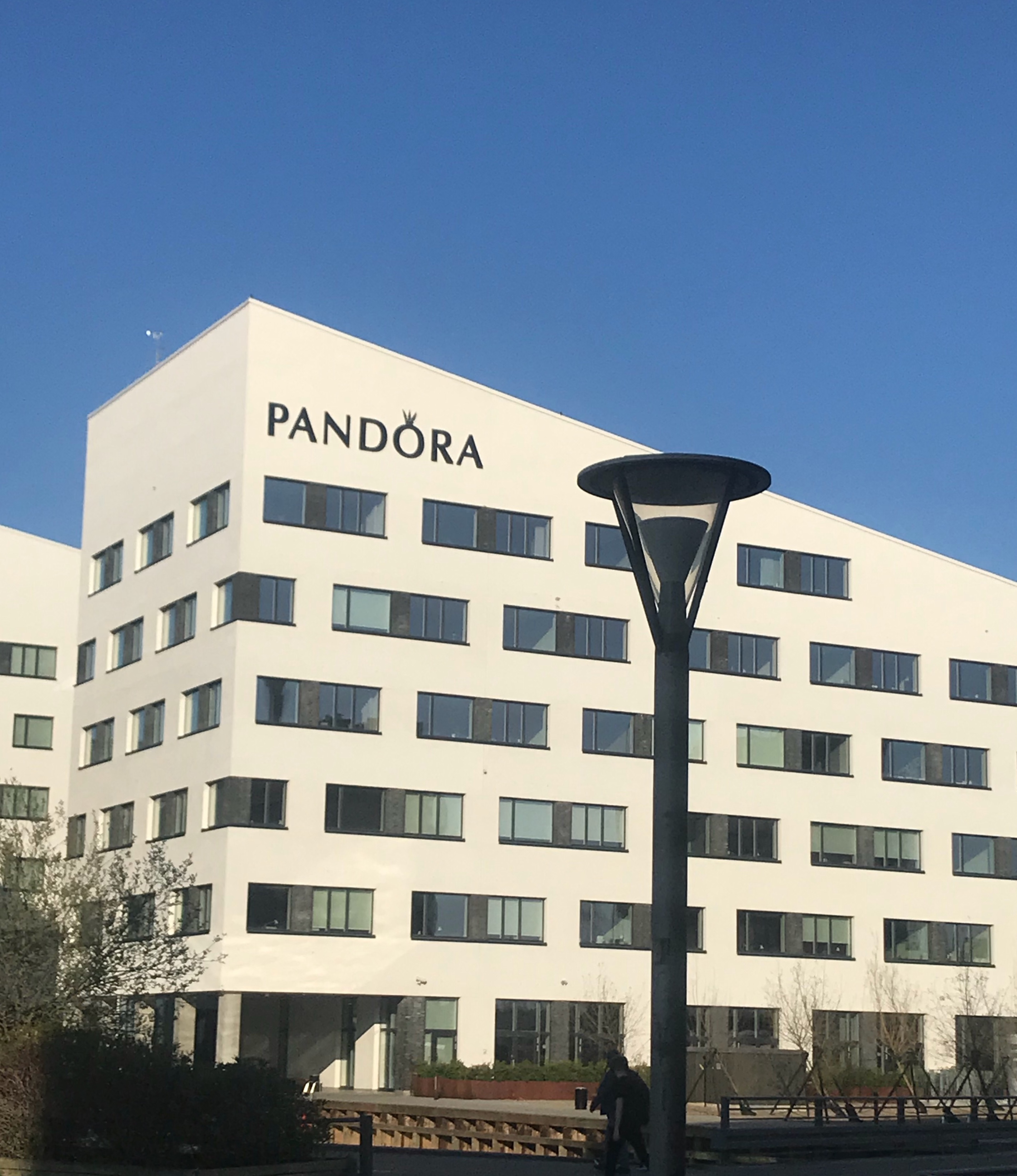
- Corporate headquarters in Copenhagen, Denmark
- Type: Publicly traded Aktieselskab
- Traded as: Nasdaq Copenhagen: PNDORA; FWB: 3P7; OTCID Basic Limited: PANDY (ADR); OTCID Basic Limited: PNDZF (Ordinary Shares); OMXC25CAP component (PNDORA)
- ISIN: DK0060252690
- Industry: Jewellery Retail
- Founded: 1982; 44 years ago
- Founder: Per Enevoldsen
- Headquarters: Havneholmen 17 - 19 DK-1561 Copenhagen, Denmark
- Number of locations: 2,811 (2025)
- Area served: Worldwide
- Key people: Berta de Pablos-Barbier (CEO); Peter A. Ruzicka (Chairman); Anders Boyer (CFO)
- Revenue: ▲DKK 28.136 billion (2023)
- Operating income: ▲DKK 7.039 billion (2023)
- Net income: ▲DKK 4.740 billion (2023)
- Total assets: ▲DKK 23.798 billion (2023)
- Total equity: ▲DKK 5.355 billion (2023)
- Number of employees: 26,000 (2020)
- Website: pandoragroup.com (Corporate); pandora.net (Consumer)

Pandora A/S (stylised in all caps) is a Danish jewelry manufacturer and retailer founded in 1982 by Per Enevoldsen. The company started as a family-run jewelry shop in Copenhagen.

Pandora is known for its customizable charm bracelets, designer rings, earrings, necklaces and (now discontinued) watches. The company has two production sites in Thailand and markets its products in more than 100 countries on six continents with more than 6,900 points of sale.

West Town Mall (Knoxville, Tennessee) branch

== History ==
Former logo, used until October 2019

Former logo, used until 2025

Pandora was founded in 1982 by Danish goldsmith Per Enevoldsen and, his then-wife, Winnie Enevoldsen. The pair began on a small scale by importing jewelry from Thailand and selling to consumers.

In 1987, the company ended its retail operations and became a pure wholesaler; two years later Enevoldsen hired in-house designers and established a manufacturing site in Thailand, where it is still located. With low production costs and an efficient supply chain, the Enevoldsens could provide affordable, hand-finished jewelry for the mass market. Pandora's collection grew to include an assortment of rings, necklaces, earrings and watches. It started selling its signature charm bracelets in 2000 after several years of development, protected by a patent.

The Danish private equity group Axcel bought a 60% stake in the company from the Enevoldsen family in 2008. Shares totalling DKK 9.96 billion (US$ 1.84 billion) were sold in an IPO in October 2010, one of the biggest IPOs in Europe that year, giving Pandora a market capitalisation of around DKK 27 billion. The company is publicly listed on the NASDAQ OMX Copenhagen Stock Exchange in Denmark and is a component of the OMX Copenhagen 20 index.

Pandora became the world's third-largest jewelry company in terms of sales, after Cartier and Tiffany & Co. In 2011, more than one piece of Pandora jewelry was sold every second on average.

Shares fell nearly 80% in 2011 after a shift in focus to higher-end designs alienated core customers, but performance recovered after a return to the more affordable mass market, with the group reporting revenue of DKK 19 billion and net profit in excess of DKK 3 billion in 2014. In 2020 and due to the Covid-19 pandemic, 80% of Pandora's 2,700 stores around the world were closed. However, the company kept paying to all its staff in full, even for those who used to work in the closed stores.

In early June 2020, Pandora had announced that all Pandora jewelry would be made from recycled silver and gold due to many reasons such as substantially reduce its greenhouse gas emission. In early 2025, Pandora anticipates to stop using newly mined gold and silver and only purchase recycled sources.

In early May 2021, Pandora announced the company would phase out mined diamonds in favour of gems manufactured in a laboratory. The new diamond jewelry was first sold in the United Kingdom before being sold globally in 2022.

In September 2025, it was announced that Chief Marketing Officer Berta de Pablos-Barbier would replace Alexander Lacik as CEO in March 2026 when Lacik planned to retire. This date was later changed and de Pablos-Barbier became CEO on January 1, 2026.

== Distribution network ==
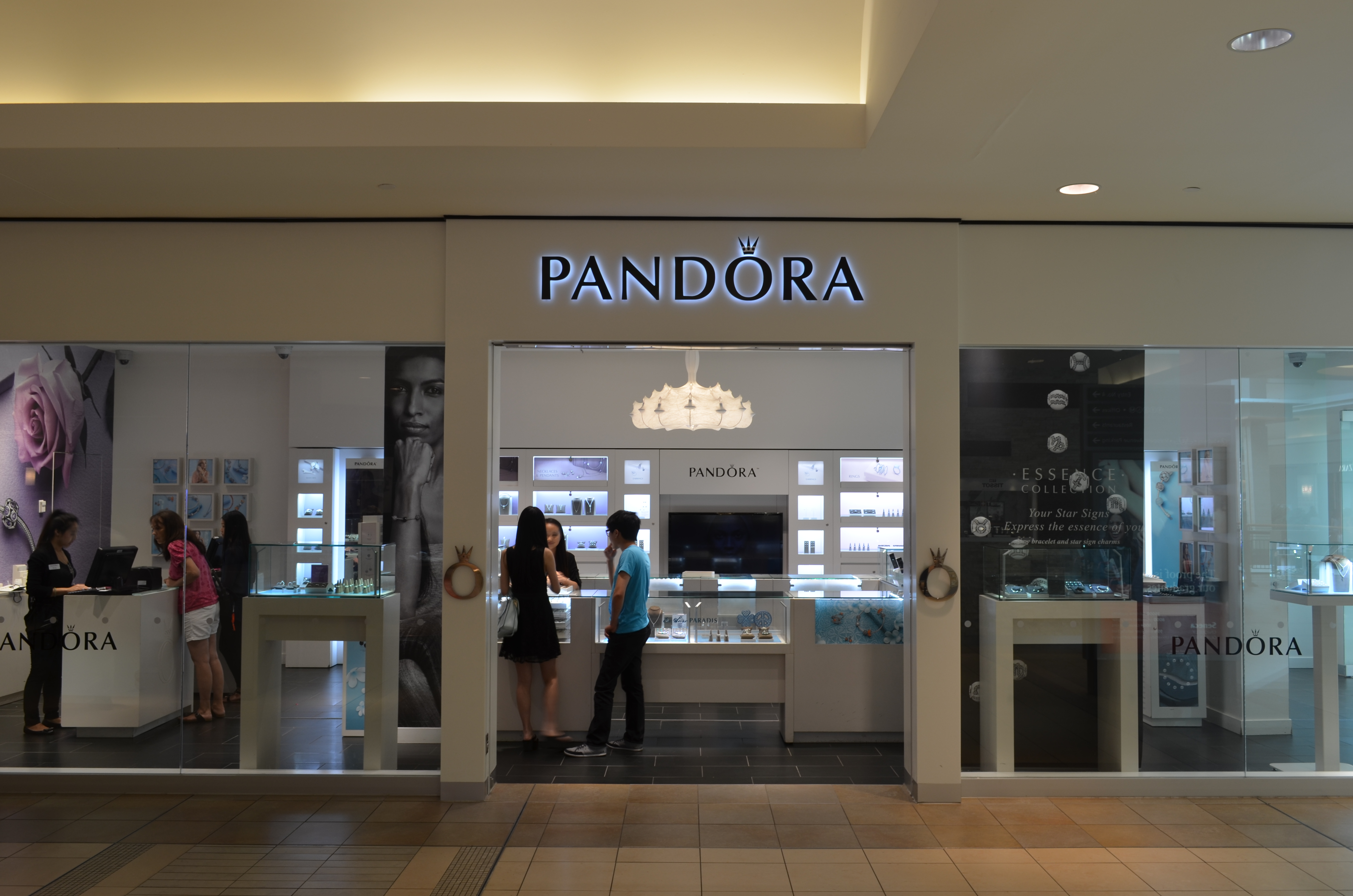
Fairview Mall (Toronto, Canada) branch

Sales of the Pandora brand began in Europe and it first entered North America in 2003. The company opened concept stores around the world before its franchising model began in Australia in 2009. Pandora products are sold in more than 100 countries on six continents through approximately 6,700 points of sale, including approximately 2,400 concept stores. The company employs over 26,000 people, of whom 13,200 are located in Thailand, the company's sole manufacturing site since 1989.

Pandora launched an online sales platform in Europe in 2011, and began working to expand its e-commerce to the majority of its markets including Australia.

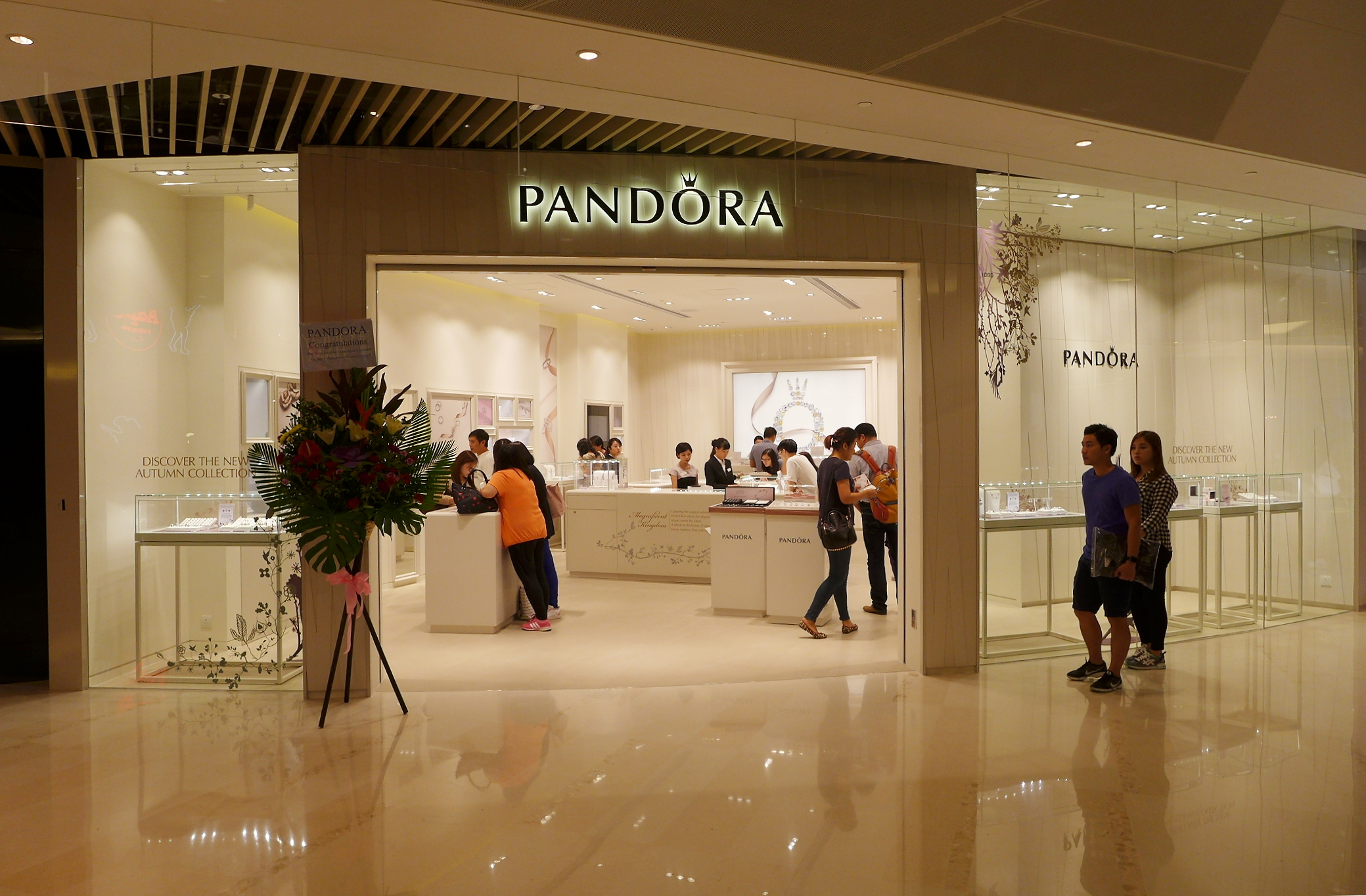
YOHO Mall (Hong Kong) branch

Europe and the United States accounted for nearly 90% of group sales in 2014. The group announced a Chinese distribution deal in 2015, with plans to increase store numbers to "a couple of hundred" in China. In 2015, it bought out Oracle Investment's shares in its Chinese distribution service.

2,811 concept stores operate around the world as of 2025, of these 2,180 are owned by Pandora.
