= Novonesis =

Danish biotechnology company

Novozymes A/S

- Factory in Roskilde, Denmark
- Trade name: Novonesis
- Type: Public
- Traded as: Nasdaq Copenhagen: NSIS B; OMX Copenhagen 25 component
- ISIN: DK0060336014
- Industry: Biotechnology
- Predecessor: Novozymes; Chr. Hansen
- Founded: January 29, 2024; 2 years ago
- Headquarters: Lyngby, Greater Copenhagen, Denmark
- Products: Enzymes; Microbiological cultures; Biopharmaceutical ingredients; Human milk oligosaccharides
- Revenue: €4,157.6 million (2025)
- Operating income: €816.7 million (2025)
- Net income: €583.6 million (2025)
- Total assets: €16,349.1 million (2025)
- Total equity: €10,855.2 million (2025)
- Number of employees: 11,641 (2025)
- Parent: Novo Holdings
- Website: novonesis.com

Novozymes A/S (trading as Novonesis) is a Danish biotechnology company. Novonesis was formed in 2024 through the merger of Novozymes and Chr. Hansen.

The company develops enzymes, microbial cultures, and other biological products used in food and beverage production, household products, agriculture, and bioenergy.

The merger, first announced in December 2022, was the largest merger in history between two Danish companies. It would combine Novozymes' industrial-enzyme business with Chr. Hansen's microbial cultures and food-ingredient operations.

The company is publicly traded on Nasdaq Copenhagen and is part of the OMX Copenhagen 25 Index. The company's largest shareholder is Novo Holdings, which is owned by the Novo Nordisk Foundation.

As of 2025, Novonesis has approximately 11,600 employees and activities in over 45 countries.

== History ==
The intended merger was first announced on December 12, 2022, cleared by the European Commission on December 12, 2023, and Novonesis was founded on January 29, 2024.

The name "Novonesis" was coined in connection with the merger. Company materials describe it as a constructed name combining "novo" (Latin for "new") and "genesis" ("origin" or "beginning" in Greek).

Novozymes was known for producing industrial enzymes used in products such as detergents, biofuels, and food. Chr. Hansen specialized in bacterial cultures and probiotics used in dairy products, dietary supplements and for agricultural applications.

In 2025, Novonesis reached an agreement with DSM-Firmenich to acquire its shares of the Feed Enzyme Alliance.

== See also ==
- Novo
