= Steno Diabetes Center =

Medical center in Gentofte, Denmark

Steno Diabetes Center is a hospital, research and teaching center dedicated to treating and managing diabetes, located in Herlev, Denmark. It is named after Nicolas Steno (Niels Steensen, 1638–1686). The center was established in 1991 as a result of the merger of the Niels Steensen Hospital and Hvidøre Hospital. The Niels Steensen hospital was founded in 1932.
