= Chr. Hansen =

Danish biotechnology company

Chr. Hansen A/S
- Type: Publicly traded Aktieselskab
- Traded as: Nasdaq Copenhagen: CHR
- ISIN: DK0060227585
- Industry: Biotechnology
- Founded: 1874; 152 years ago
- Defunct: January 29, 2024
- Fate: Merged with Novozymes
- Successor: Novonesis
- Headquarters: Hørsholm, Denmark
- Key people: Dominique Reiniche (Chair), Mauricio Graber (President and CEO)
- Products: Microbiological cultures, enzymes, probiotics, human milk oligosaccharides
- Revenue: €1,218.0 million (2022)
- Operating income: €325.8 million (2022)
- Net income: €225.1 million (2022)
- Total assets: €3,316.8 million (2022)
- Total equity: €1,823.9 million (2022)
- Number of employees: 3,834 (2022)
- Website: Archived 2 January 2024 at the Wayback Machine

Chr. Hansen A/S was a biotechnology company based in Hørsholm, Denmark. The company is a supplier of bacteria cultures, probiotics, enzymes and human milk oligosaccharides. Its products are used in the production of fresh dairy, cheese, meat, seafood, fermented beverages, dairy and meat alternatives, dietary supplements, infant formula, pharmaceuticals and agricultural products. In 2021, Chr. Hansen A/S was ranked 1st on FoodTalks' Top 30 Global Probiotic Food Ingredient Companies list. Chr. Hansen owns one of the world's largest commercial bacteria collections. The company merged with Novozymes to form Novonesis in January 2024.

Chr. Hansen A/S has development centers in Denmark, the United States, France and Germany including research facilities in Denmark and France. A large percentage of the employees engage in research and development for the international food and pharmaceuticals industries.

Chr. Hansen A/S has five main production sites: two in Denmark and Germany (Nienburg and Pohlheim) and one each in France (Arpajon) and the US (West Allis, WI) and an international presence in 30 countries. It was previously listed on Nasdaq OMX Copenhagen under the symbol "CHR".

== History ==
The company is named for its founder, Christian D. A. Hansen, a pioneering Danish chemist whose work focused on enzymes. Hansen began the company in 1874 as a joint venture with pharmacist H.P. Madsen.

Initial products included animal rennet for cheese-making as well as annatto-based coloring agents for butter and cheese. Operations in the United States were begun in 1878. Their lines soon expanded to include starter cultures for cheese, yogurt and sour cream. In 1890 Hansen purchased Lock Island in the Mohawk River in Little Falls, New York, for a manufacturing facility, renaming the island "Hansen Island". Hansen's son Johannes took over the company in 1916 upon his father's death. That same year, the company began production in England to bypass the German blockade of exports to Great Britain and beyond during World War I. Facilities in Italy and Germany followed in 1936 during the inter-war period. By 1951, Hansen began production in Australia. Further international expansion in places such as South America followed, and from the 1970s to the 1990s saw a period of acquisition of other firms. The company released its first probiotic in 1987. In 1991, the Lundbeck Foundation obtained majority control of the company and initiated a major restructuring into a holding company format. Additional growth and consolidation followed, and Chr. Hansen Group was spun off into a separate, independent company in May 2005 which allowed the company to focus on long-term growth strategies rather than quarterly goals.

In December 2022, Chr. Hansen started the merger with Novozymes. It is planned to be implemented at the end of 2023. The proposed merger between Novozymes A/S (‘Novozymes') and Christian Hansen A/S (‘Chr. Hansen') is regarded by the European Commission as conditional with the commitments offered by the parties.

The company in June 2023 succumbed to pressure from right-wing religious groups in the US and dropped support to their LGBT+ staff. This caused widespread staff protest. Meanwhile, the merger partner Novozymes has maintained its stance as full LGBT+ allies.

In December 2023, it was announced that name of the new company formed as a result of the merger between Chr. Hansen and Novozymes would be Novonesis.

== Sustainability ==
Chr. Hansen began looking for healthier meat alternatives in the mid-1970s due to rising problems within the chicken and meat industry. In 2019, Chr. Hansen was ranked as the most sustainable company in the world. The ranking was given by the Canadian business and society magazine Corporate Knights and was announced at the World Economics Forum in Davos, Switzerland.

In November 2021, Chr. Hansen launched climate targets for 2030 and began to reduce its carbon footprint in an effort to meet those targets.
