= Leo Pharma =

Danish pharmaceutical company

LEO Pharma A/S
- Type: Aktieselskab
- Industry: Pharmaceutical industry
- Founded: 1908; 118 years ago
- Founder: August Kongsted and Anton Antons
- Headquarters: Ballerup, Copenhagen, Denmark
- Area served: Worldwide
- Key people: Christophe Bourdon (CEO)
- Products: Prescription drugs for dermatology, bone remodeling thrombosis and coagulation
- Revenue: ▲DKK DKK 11.4 billion (2023)
- Net income: ▲DKK 3.6 billion (2023)
- Total assets: ▼DKK 21.0 billion (2023)
- Number of employees: ▼4,000 (2024)
- Parent: Unilab Group; LEO Foundation, Nordic Capital
- Website: Home Page
- Footnotes; Wholly owned by a foundation (nonprofit)

LEO Pharma A/S is a multinational Danish pharmaceutical company, founded in 1908, with a presence in about 100 countries. Its headquarters are in Ballerup, near Copenhagen The company is 100% integrated into a private foundation owned by the LEO Foundation. LEO Pharma develops and markets products for dermatology, bone remodeling thrombosis and coagulation. In 1945, it was the first producer of penicillin outside the US and UK.

== History ==
=== Formation & the 20th Century ===
In 1908, pharmacists August Kongsted and Anton Antons bought the LEO Pharmacy in Copenhagen, Denmark. With the purchase, they established 'Københavns Løveapoteks kemiske Fabrik', today known as LEO Pharma. LEO products are available in more than a hundred countries. Today, LEO Pharma has over 4,800 specialists focusing on dermatology and thrombosis.

- 1912 – The company launched its own Aspirin headache tablet
- 1917 – The company exported Denmark's first drug, Digisolvin
- 1940 – The company launched its own heparin product.
- 1958 – Patent filed for bendrofluazide.
- 1962 – The company launched Fucidin to be used to treat staphylococcus infections.

=== 21st Century & onwards ===
In 2018, the company acquired Bayer's dermatology unit for an undisclosed amount.

In April 2022, the company appointed Christophe Bourdon as its new CEO. Prior to this, he served as the CEO of Orphazyme A/S.

In January 2023, the company started extensive layoffs (of about 300 of its current employees, or ~5% of the workforce) as a part of major restructuring and reorganization in anticipation of a possibly planned IPO. Because of slimming down of the company's R&D program, new early-stage drug candidates will have to be sourced externally.

In August 2023, it was announced LEO Pharma had entered into a definitive agreement to acquire key assets of the Basking Ridge-headquartered biopharma company, Timber Pharmaceuticals, for $36 million. This transaction included TMB-001, a topical isotretinoin ointment currently under development for the treatment of moderate to severe subtypes of Congenital Ichthyosis (CI), which has no treatment options.

In September 2023, the company announced the implementation of a new capital structure with over 4 billion Danish kroner (approximately $587 million) allocated for business development and mergers and acquisitions. The company is focused on acquiring assets aimed at treating rare dermatological diseases with unmet medical needs.

In February 2024, LEO Pharma announced a net loss of 3.6 billion DKK (equivalent to $528 million) for 2023 due to non-recurring project impairments, tax asset adjustments, and rising interest expenses. It also reported that it had cut its operating costs by 14% and increased its revenues by 7% in 2023.

In February 2025, LEO Pharma reported a net loss of 1.7 billion DKK for 2024 while revenues grew by 10% to 12.4 billion DKK.

== Controversies ==
LEO Pharma, along with 21 other Danish companies, was accused of bribery and corruption in connection with the Oil-for-Food Programme that came to light in 2005. The accusation was that LEO Pharma had acted outside the UN system during the first Gulf War by bribing employees in the relief program and thereby helping Saddam Hussein. LEO Pharma quickly settled with the police and paid 8.5 million. The new CEO quickly cracked down on corruption both abroad and internally. This can affect employee flexibility and cause delays in production. In Berlingske Business on June 6, 2015, Gitte Aabo speaks about her personal responsibility and that LEO is ready for a few years of lower earnings, which is a possible consequence of her intervention in employee relations.
