= Novo Nordisk Foundation =

Danish enterprise foundation

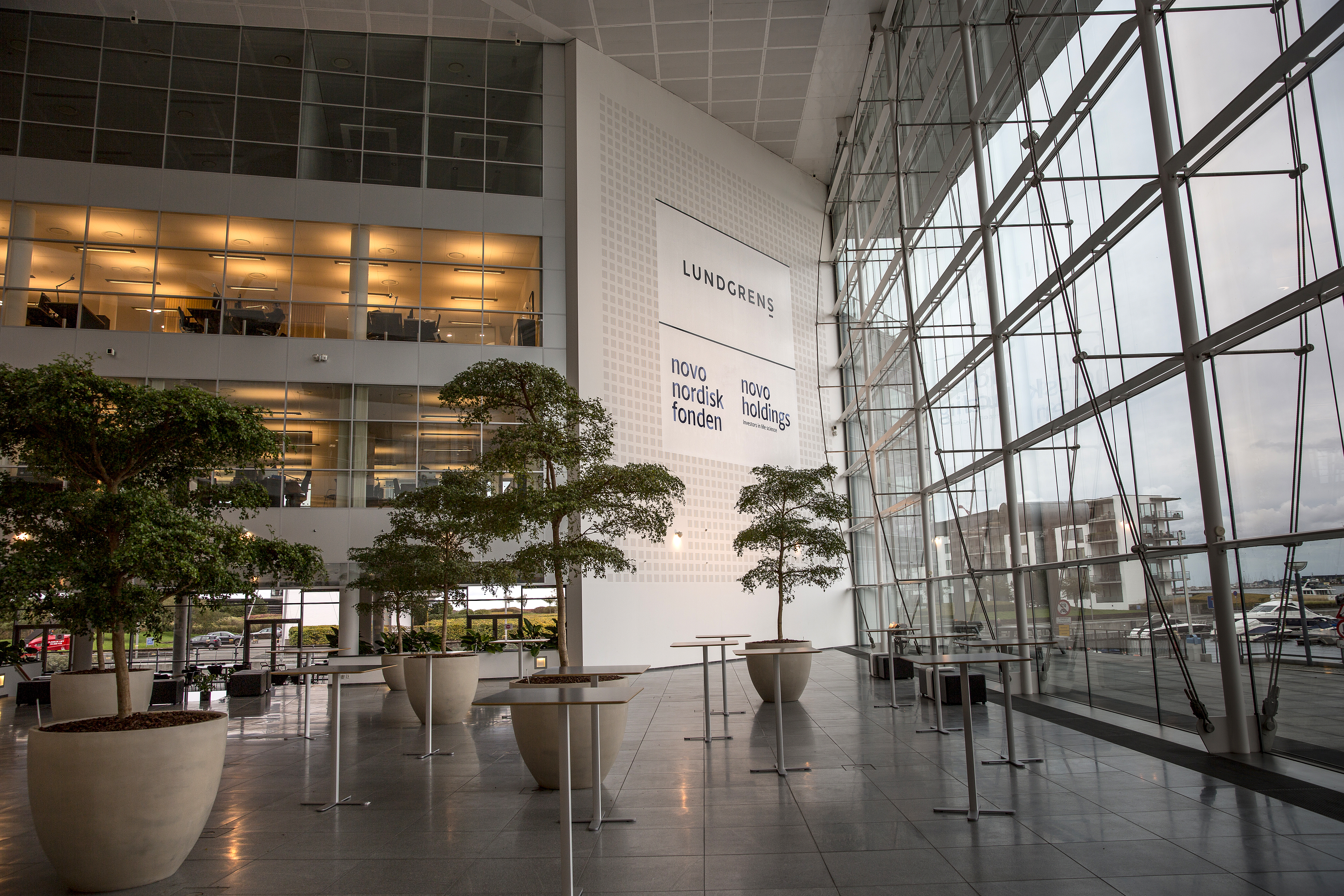
- Founded: 1989; 37 years ago in Denmark
- Type: Enterprise foundation
- Headquarters: Hellerup, Greater Copenhagen, Denmark
- Fields: Life sciences, natural sciences, social sciences
- Key people: Lars Rebien Sørensen (chair); Mads Krogsgaard Thomsen (CEO)
- Subsidiaries: Novo Holdings
- Endowment: DKK 694 billion (US$109 billion) (2025)
- Website: novonordiskfonden.dk/en

The Novo Nordisk Foundation is a Danish enterprise foundation established in 1989. It supports research and other activities primarily in health, sustainability, and life sciences.

The foundation is the controlling shareholder of Novo and Novonesis (formerly Novozymes) through its investment arm, Novo Holdings. It holds a minority of the share capital in Novo and Novonesis but controls a majority of the voting rights. Income derived from these holdings constitutes the foundation's primary source of funding.

As of year-end 2025, Novo Holdings managed assets valued at DKK 694 billion (approximately US$109 billion) on behalf of the foundation, ranking it among the world's largest charitable foundations by assets.

== History ==
=== 1920s: Discovery of insulin ===
The origins of the Novo Nordisk Foundation are linked to the early development of insulin production in Denmark in the 1920s. In 1922, Danish professor August Krogh obtained the rights to produce insulin in Scandinavia following its discovery in Canada. In 1923, Nordisk Insulinlaboratorium was established, and a foundation ownership model was adopted in December 1926 where the profits from Nordisk Insulinlaboratorium's sales were directed to the Nordisk Insulin Foundation.

=== Mid-20th century to today ===
During the mid-20th century, the Danish insulin industry developed through two principal companies: Nordisk Insulinlaboratorium and Novo Terapeutisk Laboratorium. The two companies operated separately for several decades before merging in 1989 to form Novo Nordisk. The foundation structures associated with the companies were subsequently consolidated, forming the basis of the present Novo Nordisk Foundation.

In the decades following the merger, the foundation evolved from primarily holding industrial ownership stakes to becoming one of the world's largest philanthropic foundations by assets. Its financial resources are derived primarily from its controlling ownership stake in Novo through Novo Holdings.

During the 2010s and 2020s, the foundation expanded its grant activities in scale and scope. In addition to funding biomedical and clinical research, it increased its support for initiatives related to sustainability, environmental research, and life science innovation.

== Legal structure ==
The Novo Nordisk Foundation is an established enterprise foundation. It is a self-governing entity with no owners, focusing on long-term ownership of the Novo Group (Novo and Novonesis) while combining business and philanthropy with scientific, humanitarian and social purposes. The Novo Nordisk Foundation's investment activities are managed by its subsidiary Novo Holdings whose sole purpose is to invest the foundation's wealth and ensure financial returns. Novo Holdings is also the holding company for the foundation's ownership of the Novo Group.

=== Ownership structure ===
The Novo Nordisk Foundation is obligated to maintain its controlling ownership in the Novo Group's two largest companies: Novo and Novonesis (formerly Novozymes).

- The foundation owns class A and B-shares in Novo corresponding to 28.1 percent of the total equity and 77.3 percent of the total voting rights.
- The foundation owns class A and B-shares in Novonesis/Novozymes corresponding to approximately 25.5 percent of the total equity and approximately 63.4 percent of the total voting rights.

The class A-shares in both companies (Novo and Novonesis/Novozymes) are unlisted and consequently cannot be publicly traded. The voting weight of the A-shares are 10 times those of B-shares in both companies.

== Endowment ==
The Novo Nordisk Foundation is the primary owner of Novo and Novonesis (formerly Novozymes) through the foundation's subsidiary company Novo Holdings. Aside from Novo and Novonesis, the foundation is also a major shareholder in other companies and assets. The foundation's financial endowment is maintained by dividends and returns on these investments.

Novo Holdings manages the foundation's assets and serves as controlling shareholder of Novo, in which it holds 28.1% of shares and 77.3% of votes, and of Novonesis, in which it holds 25.5% of shares and 63.4% of votes. Together, these controlling stakes make up the Novo Group on the balance sheet of the Novo Nordisk Foundation and Novo Holdings.

Through Novo Holdings, the foundation is a shareholder in approximately 170 other companies as of year-end 2025.

The foundation's financial wealth is reported annually as total assets under management by Novo Holdings. AUM is calculated at market value and includes the foundation's controlling stakes in the Novo Group companies, valued using the quoted B-share price at close on 31 December of the respective year, together with the Investment Assets Portfolio managed by Novo Holdings. The Foundation references this calculation in annual report.

=== Composition ===
As of year-end 2025, Novo Holdings reported total assets under management (AUM) of DKK 694 billion (approximately €93 billion or US$109 billion).

The portfolio is composed of two main categories:

Composition of Total Assets under Management, year-end 2025
Component	DKK	USD (approx.)	Share of AUM
Novo Group (controlling stakes)	DKK 456 bn	~ $72 bn	66%
→ Novo (28.1% of shares; 77.3% of votes)	DKK 407 bn	~ $64 bn	59%
→ Novonesis (25.5% of shares; 63.4% of votes)	DKK 49 bn	~ $8 bn	7%
Investment Assets Portfolio	DKK 238 bn	~ $37 bn	34%
→ Life Science Investments	DKK 124 bn	~ $19 bn	18%
→ Capital Investments	DKK 114 bn	~ $18 bn	16%
Total Assets under Management	DKK 694 bn	$109 bn	100%

The Investment Assets Portfolio comprises approximately 170 portfolio companies and is split between Life Science Investments (managed through Seed, Venture, Asia, Planetary Health, Growth and Principal Investments teams) and Capital Investments (covering public and private equities, bonds, real estate, infrastructure assets and private equity).

=== Historical trajectory ===
The Foundation's Total Assets under Management have fluctuated substantially in recent years, reflecting movements in the Investment Assets Portfolio and in the share prices of Novo and Novonesis.

Total Assets under Management (billions), year-end 2021–2025
Year-end	Novo Group (DKK bn.)	Investment Assets (DKK bn.)	Total AUM (DKK bn.)	Total AUM (USD bn, approx.)	Novo Group share
2021	DKK 515	DKK 182	DKK 697	~ $106	74%
2022	DKK 625	DKK 180	DKK 805	~ $115	78%
2023	DKK 913	DKK 201	DKK 1,114	~ $165	82%
2024	DKK 831	DKK 229	DKK 1,060	~ $148	78%
2025	DKK 456	DKK 238	DKK 694	~ $109	66%

USD figures for 2025 are reported directly by Novo Holdings; figures for prior years are derived from the DKK amounts using European Central Bank euro reference rates at 31 December of the respective year. The composition reflects that the majority of the foundation's wealth, as measured by AUM, is concentrated in its controlling stakes in Novo and Novonesis.

The decline in AUM from year-end 2024 to year-end 2025 was driven primarily by a fall in Novo's share price; Novo Holdings reported a return of −46.6% on its Novo holding for 2025.

== Types of grants ==
The Novo Nordisk Foundation offers grants under five main models:

- Open-competition Grants: These are regular research grants awarded through open calls to the academic community. They include both shorter-duration project-focused grants and longer-duration research leader grants.
- Stand-alone Grants: These are awarded within the Novo Nordisk Foundation's focus areas based on peer reviews. They encompass project grants, research leader grants, investigator grants, fellowships, infrastructure grants, and more.
- Partnerships: Grants awarded for collaborations with public and/or private partners.
- Impact Investments: Targeting companies like start-ups, often in the form of loans and investments, to support activities with positive societal impact.
- Own Initiatives: Grants for initiatives that start as local units of the Novo Nordisk Foundation and then are spun out as independent foundations.

=== Distribution of grants ===
The foundation has an objective of providing support for scientific, humanitarian and social purposes. The grants go primarily to support research in biomedicine, biotechnology, general medicine, nursing and art history at public knowledge institutions. Humanitarian and social purposes includes the Steno Diabetes Center research hospital.

== Prizes ==
The Novo Nordisk Foundation awards a number of prizes, including the Novo Nordisk Prize for outstanding research in medical science and the Novozymes Prize focusing on biotechnology and environmental research. The Novo Nordisk Foundation also recognise achievements in teaching and education in the sciences through awards such as the Hagedorn Prize and various scholarships and grants to support upcoming scientists and educators.

=== International prizes ===
- Novo Nordisk Prize – Advances in medical science
- Novozymes Prize
- Marie and August Krogh Prize
- Jacobaeus Prize
- Hagedorn Prize
- The EFSD and the Novo Nordisk Foundation Precision Diabetes Medicine Award
- Obesity Prize for Excellence
- Diabetes Prize for Excellence
- Novo Nordisk Foundation Lecture Prize
- EFSD/Novo Nordisk Foundation Future Leaders Award Programme

=== Teaching prizes ===
- Novo Nordisk Foundation Prize for Upper-secondary School Science Teachers
- Novo Nordisk Foundation Prize for Science Teachers at University Colleges
- Novo Nordisk Foundation Prize for Science Childhood Educators
- Novo Nordisk Foundation Prize for Primary School Science Teachers
- Novo Nordisk Foundation Prize for Lower-secondary School Science Teachers
- Novo Nordisk Foundation Nature-based Educator Prize

== Reception ==
=== Role in research and funding ===
The level of research funding concentration granted from enterprise foundations has consistently been a central issue in science policy discussions. Intensive concentration has been viewed both as a means to enhance and direct research investments effectively and as a concerning trend leading to excessive competition, reduced diversity, and the selection of conservative topics.

There is a focus on evaluating potential imbalances in the distribution of research funds in Danish society regarding the role of the Novo Nordisk Foundation in advancing scientific research and innovation.

One criticism is related to the foundation's significant economic influence in the research landscape. The substantial grants from the foundation may inadvertently overshadow other sources of research funding and potentially lead to a concentration of resources in certain research areas closely aligned with the foundation's priorities and interests.

Concerns have been raised about the potential influence of the Novo Nordisk Foundation's agenda on the direction of scientific research. Critics express concerns about the potential effect of the foundation's allocation of funds on the diversity of research topics and perspectives within the Danish scientific community, as it tends to prioritize projects that align with its strategic goals.

=== Funding disparities ===
The Novo Nordisk Foundation has faced criticism for the concentration of its research funding, often favouring a select group of established researchers. This trend, prevalent in many countries, leads to funding disparities, where a majority of resources are allocated to a small percentage of researchers, often to the detriment of early-career, female, and diverse researchers. In response to these concerns, the Novo Nordisk Foundation has introduced partial randomisation in its grant allocation process. This approach was designed to mitigate biases and increase the diversity of funded research, aiming to support projects that might otherwise be overlooked. The effectiveness of this strategy has been under evaluation during a three-year trial period.

== Initiatives ==
=== Recent developments ===
In 2024 and 2025, the Novo Nordisk Foundation expanded a number of its grant programmes and entered some large-scale international collaborations.

==== Global Science Summit ====
In May 2024, the foundation convened a Global Science Summit in Denmark, bringing together approximately 150 scientific leaders to discuss challenges related to health, sustainability, and technology. The summit was also used to announce several new funding commitments, including a three-way partnership with Wellcome and the Bill & Melinda Gates Foundation, in which each organisation committed US$100 million (a total of US$300 million) to fund global health research over three years, with a focus on low- and middle-income countries. The partnership targeted the health impacts of climate change, infectious diseases and antimicrobial resistance, and the links between nutrition, immunity and disease.

==== Gefion AI supercomputer ====
In March 2024, the foundation announced plans to co-fund the construction of an AI supercomputer in Denmark, later named Gefion. The system was built in partnership with the Export and Investment Fund of Denmark (EIFO) through a jointly established company, the Danish Centre for AI Innovation A/S (DCAI). The foundation committed approximately DKK 600 million to the project's initial costs, while EIFO contributed DKK 100 million. Gefion is based on an NVIDIA DGX SuperPOD architecture comprising 1,528 NVIDIA H100 Tensor Core GPUs. The system was inaugurated in October 2024 in the presence of King Frederik X and NVIDIA CEO Jensen Huang. In November 2024, Gefion entered the TOP500 list of the world's most powerful supercomputers at rank 21. The system is hosted in a Digital Realty data centre in Denmark running on 100 percent renewable energy and is intended to support research in healthcare, life sciences, and sustainability.

==== International grant expansion ====
In 2024, the foundation stated that it intended to direct a growing share of its annual grants to recipients outside Denmark, citing the global nature of challenges such as climate change and health inequity. In April 2025, the Challenge Programme, the foundation's flagship competitive research grant scheme, was opened to applicants based in the Schengen Area, Ireland, and the United Kingdom for the first time, with the maximum individual project grant raised to DKK 75 million.

==== WHO partnership ====
In May 2025, the foundation entered into a strategic framework agreement with the World Health Organization (WHO), pledging up to DKK 380 million (approximately US$57 million) over the period 2025–2028 to support WHO programmes targeting non-communicable diseases, antimicrobial resistance, and health system resilience. The commitment was announced at the 78th World Health Assembly in Geneva.

==== Regional initiatives and PEP ====
The foundation has also expanded its operational presence in low- and middle-income countries. It has supported the Partnership for Education of Health Professionals (PEP), a programme aimed at strengthening the education of nurses and other health workers in India and Kenya. The University of Copenhagen was awarded a DKK 52.9 million grant under PEP to co-develop health professions education capacity in India and Kenya, focusing on cardiometabolic diseases, healthcare workforce shortages, and underserved populations.

==== Biotechnology Research Institute for the Green Transition (BRIGHT) ====
In December 2024, the Novo Nordisk Foundation announced a grant of up to DKK 1.05 billion (approximately €134 million) over seven years to establish the Novo Nordisk Foundation Biotechnology Research Institute for the Green Transition (BRIGHT) at the Technical University of Denmark (DTU). BRIGHT is structured as a research hub within DTU, intended to develop and scale biologically based production methods, known as biosolutions, that can substitute fossil-derived materials and processes in sectors such as agriculture, food production, and industrial manufacturing. The institute was designed to build on the work of the existing Novo Nordisk Foundation Center for Biosustainability at DTU, whose activities were scheduled to transition into BRIGHT or be phased out as the new grant programme was implemented. BRIGHT began its activities in 2025.

==== CARB-X and antimicrobial resistance ====
In January 2024, the foundation committed up to US$25 million over three years to the Combating Antibiotic-Resistant Bacteria Biopharmaceutical Accelerator (CARB-X), a global non-profit public-private partnership that funds early-stage development of products to prevent, diagnose, and treat drug-resistant bacterial infections. CARB-X is headquartered at Boston University and is supported by the U.S. Department of Health and Human Services, the Wellcome Trust, the Bill & Melinda Gates Foundation, and several national governments, including Germany and the United Kingdom. The foundation's commitment to CARB-X formed part of a broader set of activities by the foundation and its investment arm, Novo Holdings, targeting antimicrobial resistance (AMR), which also included the REPAIR Impact Fund - established by Novo Holdings in 2018 with a total budget of US$165 million to invest in companies developing therapies targeting resistant microorganisms - and the Novo Nordisk Foundation Initiative for Vaccines and Immunity (NIVI).

==== QuNorth ====
In July 2025, the Novo Nordisk Foundation together with Denmark’s Export and Investment Fund, provided $92.93 million to QuNorth. QuNorth is an initiative for the creation and operation of the quantum computer Magne in Denmark.

==== Center for Protein Design ====
In June 2025, the University of Copenhagen received DKK 700 million (US$106 million) to establish the Center for Protein Design from the Novo Nordisk Foundation. The Center was officially launched in August 2025 to conduct interdisciplinary research in protein design.

==== CardioMetabolic Bridge ====
In June 2026, it was announced that the Foundation would provide up to DKK 450 million (€60.2 million) over six years to the CardioMetabolic Bridge, a European translational-research and drug-discovery initiative with laboratory sites planned in the United Kingdom, Italy, and Germany.

==== Evidence for AI in Health ====
On 20 February 2026, the Novo Nordisk Foundation, together with the Gates Foundation, and Wellcome, launched the Evidence for AI in Health initiative. A total of $60 million in joint support over three years would be provided for locally led evaluations of AI health tools in low- and middle-income countries in Africa, South Asia, and Southeast Asia.

=== Research initiatives ===
In 2018, the Novo Nordisk Foundation invested in stem cell-based therapy research to focus on new therapeutic approaches for chronic diseases, exploring the regenerative potential of stem cells.

The Novo Nordisk Foundation contributed to support the fight against the COVID-19 pandemic in the spring of 2020. As of June 2020, the foundation had donated DKK 366.2 million (approx $55.77 million) for COVID-19 related measures, including test centres in Denmark (DKK 250 million for 11 COVID-19 test centres), financing research projects aimed at mitigating the health consequences of COVID-19, emergency production of ethanol in cooperation with the Carlsberg Foundation to manufacture hand sanitizers and disinfection.

In 2022, the Novo Nordisk Foundation formed in partnership with the Bill & Melinda Gates Foundation and Open Philanthropy to focus on developing accessible oral antiviral treatments for viruses with pandemic potential. The initiative aimed to support researchers globally in identifying and developing phase 2-ready antiviral drug candidates.

In 2023, the Novo Nordisk Foundation allocated $260 million to develop vaccines for respiratory diseases such as tuberculosis and influenza. This initiative, known as the Novo Nordisk Foundation Initiative for Vaccines and Immunity (NIVI), collaborated with the University of Copenhagen and Denmark's Statens Serum Institut. It emphasised generating immunity in the airway, a novel approach in vaccine development.

In 2023, the Novo Nordisk Foundation worked on developing vaccines and treatments for tuberculosis, addressing the broader issue of antimicrobial resistance.

In 2023, the Novo Nordisk Foundation launched an initiative to support research infrastructure development, specifically aimed at facilitating the creation and scaling up of cell therapy solutions and products.

=== Research centres ===
Research centres funded by the Novo Nordisk Foundation
Centre	Host	Established	Foundation commitment
Steno Diabetes Centers	Denmark's five regions, the Faroe Islands and Greenland	2017	DKK 7.9 billion
Novo Nordisk Foundation Center for Basic Metabolic Research (CBMR)	University of Copenhagen	2010	DKK 2.585 billion
Novo Nordisk Foundation Center for Protein Research	University of Copenhagen	2007	DKK 1.48 billion
Novo Nordisk Foundation Center for Biosustainability	Technical University of Denmark	2011	More than DKK 2 billion (2011–2025)
Biotechnology Research Institute for the Green Transition (BRIGHT)	Technical University of Denmark	2025	Up to DKK 1.05 billion (seven years)
Novo Nordisk Foundation Center for Stem Cell Medicine (reNEW)	University of Copenhagen, Leiden University Medical Center, Murdoch Children's Research Institute	2022	Up to DKK 2.2 billion (2022–2031)
Novo Nordisk Foundation Center for Genomic Mechanisms of Disease	Broad Institute	2021	US$100.5 million (2021 and 2026 grants)
Novo Nordisk Foundation CO2 Research Center (CORC)	Aarhus University	2022	DKK 630 million (seven years)
Novo Nordisk Foundation Quantum Computing Programme (NQCP)	Niels Bohr Institute, University of Copenhagen	2022	DKK 1.5 billion (12 years)
Centre for Childhood Health (Center for Sundt Liv og Trivsel)	Independent centre, set up with the Danish Ministry of Health	2023	Up to DKK 1 billion (2023–2032)
BioInnovation Institute (BII)	Independent foundation, Copenhagen	2017	Up to DKK 5.5 billion (2026–2035)
Novo Nordisk Foundation Center for Protein Design (CPD)	University of Copenhagen	2025	DKK 700 million

== Governance ==
The Novo Nordisk Foundation is headed by Lars Rebien Sørensen (chairman of the board) and Mads Krogsgaard Thomsen (CEO).

=== Board of directors ===
The Novo Nordisk Foundation's board of directors consists of ten members. In addition to the chairman and vice chairman, the board consists of four members elected by statute, two of whom must have medical or scientific expertise, and three employee representatives from Novo and Novonesis (formerly Novozymes).

Name	Position
Lars Rebien Sørensen	Chairman
Lars Henrik Munch	Vice chairman
Christopher A. Voigt	Board member
Jakob Müller	Board member
Lars Green	Board member
Barbara Casadei	Board member
Pavle Acimovic	Board member
Nana Bule Sejbæk	Board member
Steen Krogsgaard	Board member
Morten Hilstrøm	Board member

=== Executive management ===
Name	Position
Mads Krogsgaard Thomsen	Chief executive officer
Flemming Konradsen	Chief scientific officer - Health
Lene Oddershede	Chief scientific officer - Planetary science and technology
Søren Nedergaard	Chief portfolio officer - Portfolio, people and partnerships
Trine Haastrup	Chief financial officer - Finance and operations
Pelle Munk-Poulsen	Chief legal officer - General counsel and board secretary
Steffen Pierini Lüders	Chief corporate affairs officer - Corporate affairs

== Awards and honors ==
=== Prix Galien CEE Pro Bono Humanum Award ===
In 2025, the Novo Nordisk Foundation received the Prix Galien CEE Pro Bono Humanum Award, a regional distinction presented as part of the Central and Eastern Europe (CEE) edition of the international Prix Galien programme. According to the award organizers, the Novo Nordisk Foundation was selected for its contributions to global health, scientific research, and initiatives aimed at improving health outcomes across diverse populations. The award was presented at the Prix Galien CEE ceremony in Warsaw, Poland. CEO of the Novo Nordisk Foundation, Mads Krogsgaard Thomsen, accepted the award on behalf of the foundation.
