= Convatec =

UK medical products and technologies company

Convatec Group plc

- Headquarters at 20 Eastbourne Terrace, Paddington
- Type: Public limited company
- Traded as: LSE: CTEC; FTSE 100 component
- Industry: Medical devices
- Founded: 1978
- Headquarters: London, England, UK
- Key people: Dr John McAdam (chairman); Jonny Mason(CEO)
- Products: Advanced wound care; Ostomy care; Continence care; Infusion care
- Revenue: ▲US$2,439 million (2025)
- Operating income: ▼US$316 million (2025)
- Net income: ▼US$175 million (2025)
- Number of employees: 10,000 (2026)
- Website: convatecgroup.com

Convatec Group plc is a medical products and technologies company based in London, England, offering products and services in the areas of advanced wound care, ostomy care, continence care and infusion care. It is listed on the London Stock Exchange and is a constituent of the FTSE 100 Index.

== History ==
The company was established as a division of E.R. Squibb & Sons, Inc. in 1978 and acquired by Nordic Capital and Avista Capital Partners in 2008. During 2008, Convatec was integrated with the Danish-based single-use medical device manufacturer Unomedical. As a result of the deal, Convatec sold off the Unomedical Wound Care and Ophthalmics businesses to comply with the European Commission regulations.

In 2012, the firm acquired 180 Medical, a US-based catheter manufacturer, for $321 million.

In June 2015, Convatec won a Court of Appeal ruling that determined that, in the context of a patent, "between 1% and 25%" should be interpreted rounding to the nearest 1%, so that an attempt to circumvent a patent by using the value 0.9% failed.

In October 2016, the company was valued at £4.4 billion, thus achieving the largest initial public offering on the London Stock Exchange that year. Two months later, it became a constituent of the FTSE 100 Index. In January 2017, Convatec bought the Dutch firm Eurotec Beheer for £21.3 million. By May 2018, Nordic Capital had sold off its entire stake in Convatec.

In the years immediately following the floatation, the company was perceived to have underperformed, such as a series of successive profit warnings, stagnating revenues, and limited investment prior to going public all being referenced. This poor performance was a contributing factor in the departure of multiple executives in the late 2010s. During early 2019, the Swedish publication Dagens Industri reported that multiple investors were considering making an offer to purchase Convatec following a recent stock downturn; the Swedish private equity firm EQT was allegedly one of these parties.

During the late 2010s, a new business strategy was adopted in which Convatec reoriented itself towards the chronic diseases sector and reduced its presence within low margin product lines; under this strategy, throughout the early 2020s, the company engaged in a spree of divestments, which included its skincare and lower-margin hospital care businesses. By 2023, 97% of Convatec’s revenues were reportedly being generated from sales of products for chronic conditions, such as insulin pumps and colostomy bags; as these products are continuously required for ongoing treatment, they produce reliable revenue streams. Furthermore, Convatec placed a far greater emphasis on innovation – a target was set that by 2025, 30 per cent of all sales should be from products less than five years old. Spending on research and development increased from 2.7 per cent of sales in 2018 to 4.6 per cent in 2023.

The firm also undertook several acquisitions and purchases during the 2020s. In early 2022, it acquired the US-based wound care company Triad Life Sciences Inc. in exchange for $125 million, after which the unit was rebranded as Convatec Advanced Tissue Technology. One year later, it bought the anti-infective nitric oxide technology platform of 30 Technology Ltd; Convatec also became a constituent of the FTSE 100 Index. In August 2024, the firm publicly raised its concerns that Britain's regulatory approval process could dissuade innovation and investment in the future.

Prior to the outbreak of the war in Ukraine in February 2022, Convatec undertook both sales and manufacturing activities in Russia. In 2023, Convatec was included in the "Leave Russia" project, which tracks companies that remain active in the Russian market. Critics argued that by continuing operations in Russia, Convatec indirectly supported the Russian economy and government during the conflict. By May 2022, the firm had shuttered its manufacturing facility in neighbouring Belarus and suspended its sales team in Russia due to the conflict.

== Operations ==
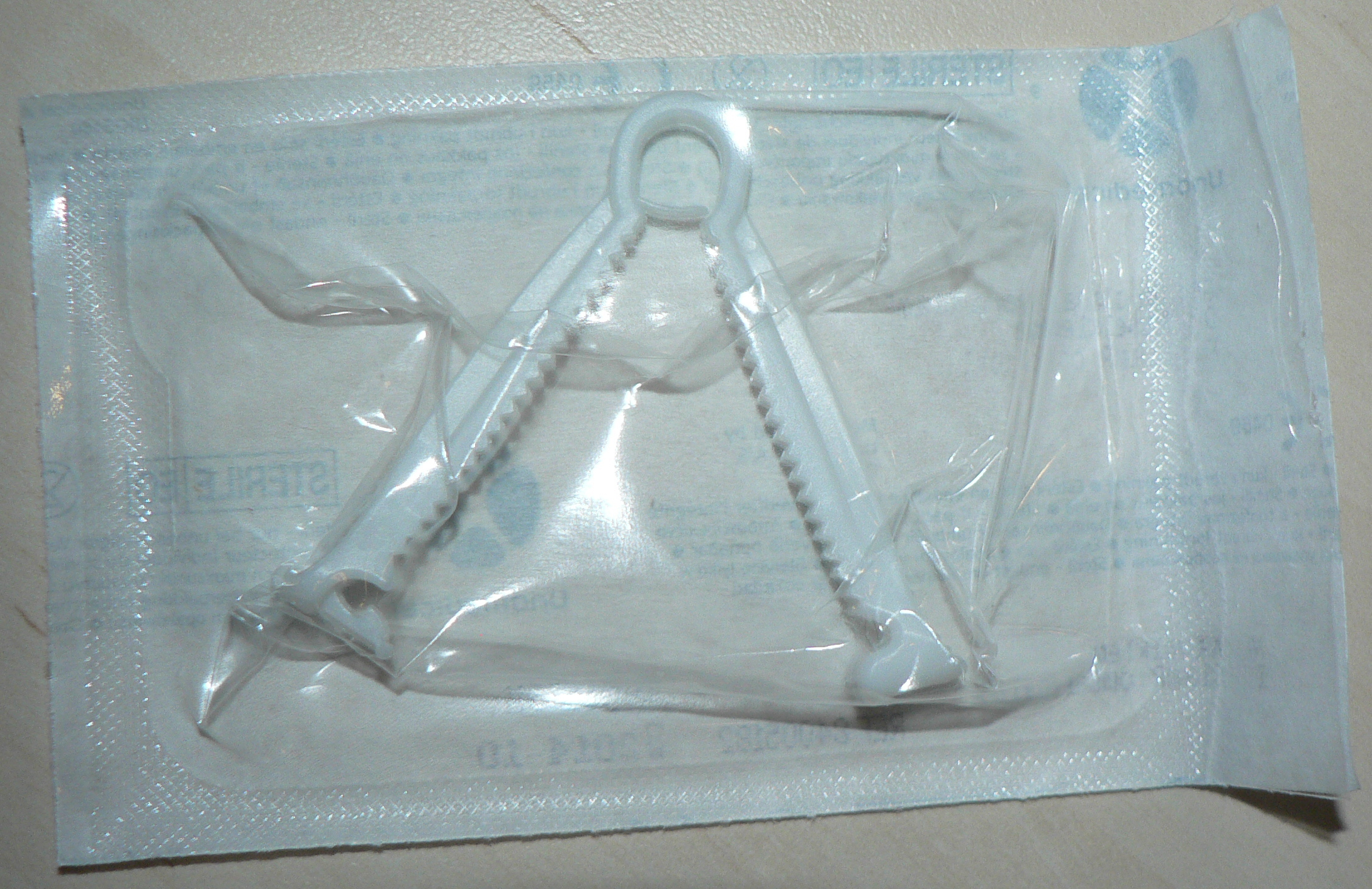
Umbilical cord clamp made by Convatec

The company has 10,000 employees and operates in more than 100 countries.
