= Novozymes =

Danish biotechnology company

Novozymes A/S

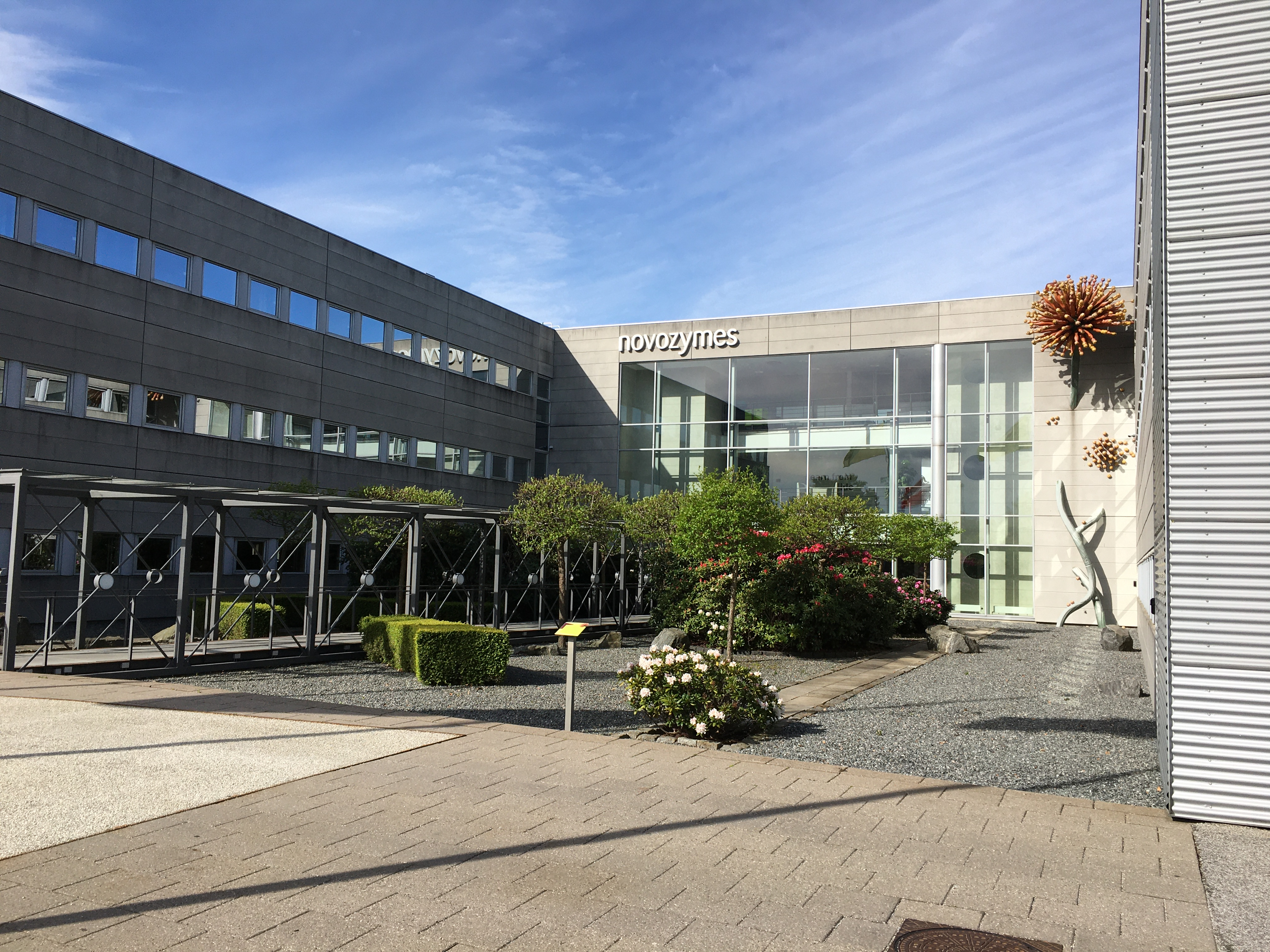
- Type: Public
- Traded as: Nasdaq Copenhagen: NZYM B
- Industry: Biotechnology
- Founded: 2000; 26 years ago
- Fate: Merged with Chr. Hansen
- Successor: Novonesis
- Headquarters: Bagsværd, Greater Copenhagen, Denmark
- Key people: Cees de Jong (Chairman); Ester Baiget (President and CEO)
- Products: Enzymes, microorganisms, biopharmaceutical ingredients
- Revenue: ▲17.6 billion kr. (2022)
- Operating income: ▲4.6 billion kr. (2022)
- Net income: ▲3.7 billion kr. (2022)
- Total assets: ▲28.0 billion kr. (2022)
- Total equity: ▲14.2 billion kr. (2022)
- Number of employees: 6,781 (2022)
- Parent: Novo Holdings
- Website: novozymes.com

Novozymes A/S was a global biotechnology company headquartered in Bagsværd, Greater Copenhagen, Denmark. The company's focus was the research, development and production of industrial enzymes, microorganisms, and biopharmaceutical ingredients. The company merged with Chr. Hansen to form Novonesis in January 2024.

Prior to the merger, the company had operations around the world, including in China, India, Brazil, Argentina, United Kingdom, the United States, and Canada. Class B shares of its stock were listed on the NASDAQ OMX Nordic exchange.

== History ==
In 1925, the brothers Harald and Thorvald Pedersen founded Novo Terapeutisk Laboratorium and Nordisk Insulinlaboratorium with the aim to produce insulin. In 1941 the company's predecessor launched its first enzyme, trypsin, extracted from the pancreas of animals and used to soften leather, and was the first to produce enzymes by fermentation using bacteria in the 1950s. In the late 1980s Novozymes presented the world's first fat-splitting enzyme for detergents manufactured with genetically engineered microorganisms, called Lipolase.

Novozymes was founded in 2000 as a spinout from pharmaceutical company Novo.

In the 2000s Novozymes expanded through the acquisition of several companies focusing on business outside the core enzyme business. Amongst them were the Brazilian bio agricultural company Turfal and German pharmaceutical, chemical and life science company EMD/Merck Crop BioScience Inc. These acquisitions made Novozymes a leader in sustainable solutions for the agricultural biological industry.

In January 2016, the company spun out its biopharmaceutical operations into Albumedix.

In June 2020, the business announced it would acquire Ireland-based PrecisionBiotics for $90 million. In December of the same year Novozymes announced it would acquire Microbiome Labs in a $125 million deal.

On 12 December 2023, it was announced that Novozymes and Danish bioscience company Chr. Hansen had obtained regulatory approval for a merger, and on the following day, the name of the combined company was revealed as Novonesis.

The merger between Novozymes and Chr. Hansen was finalized on 29 January 2024 after receiving all final approvals from the Danish Business Authority.

== Ownership ==
The Novozymes class A share capital is held by Novo Holdings, a wholly owned subsidiary of the Novo Nordisk Foundation. In addition, Novo holds 5,826,280 B shares, which overall gives Novo 25.5% of the total share capital and 70.1% of the votes.
