= Emergency bleeding control =

Procedures to rapidly limit dangerous levels of bleeding

- Specialty: Emergency medicine

Emergency bleeding control describes actions that control bleeding from a patient who has suffered a traumatic injury or who has a medical condition that has caused bleeding. Many bleeding control techniques are taught as part of first aid throughout the world. Other advanced techniques, such as tourniquets, are taught in advanced first aid courses and are used by health professionals to prevent blood loss by arterial bleeding. To manage bleeding effectively, it is important to be able to readily identify types of wounds and types of bleeding.

== Types of wounds ==
Wounds are normally described in a variety of ways. Descriptions may include wound size (length) and thickness; plainly visible wound characteristics such as shape and open or closed; and origin, acute or chronic. The most common descriptors of wounds are these:

- Incision: Straight edges to the wound margins, as if sliced with a knife. These can vary in size, and may be caused by a variety of objects, including a scalpel, a knife, any piece of straight, sharp metal, or a piece of glass. Tissue is rarely missing from the wound site, and the margins of the wound may be easily matched from one side of the wound to the other for the purposes of closure.
- Laceration: Jagged edges to the wound margins, more closely resembling a tear than a slice. The direction of the wound is random rather than straight, and it may have multiple branches. Most often caused by an object with a broken or serrated edge, such as a piece of broken glass or metal, but may also be caused by a blow from a blunt object to tissue with bone immediately behind it.
- Puncture: Sharp object penetrates the tissue and travels inward, but does not move laterally in any direction from the point of entry. Such wounds can be misleading, as they may appear quite small on surface examination, but extend quite deeply into the body, even damaging nerves, blood vessels, or internal organs. They may cause substantial internal bleeding or secondary injuries, such as a collapsed lung, which may not be readily evident during primary assessment. Occasionally, the object causing the injury remains in the wound as an impaled object. A stab wound from a knife or other sharp object, or a bullet wound, are examples of this type of injury. Medical professionals usually refer to this type of wound as penetrating trauma.
- Abrasion: A scraping or scratching. Generally quite superficial, and affecting only the surface layers of the epidermis. No internal organs, nerves, or blood vessels other than capillaries, are affected. This may be the result of a fall, or of sliding (friction) against rough surfaces. The road rash often suffered by falling motorcyclists is an example of this type of wound.
- Contusion: Simple bruising. In this type of injury, the capillaries in the epidermis and dermis are damaged, without breaking the skin. Blood oozes out of these vessels into the spaces between cells or interstitial space, causing swelling and discoloration. Blood loss is generally limited, and not of serious consequence. It may, however, act as a signpost, pointing to more serious injuries.
- Avulsion: A full thickness laceration-type wound, often semi-circular in shape. This creates a flap that, when lifted, exposes the deeper tissues to view, or extrudes them from the wound itself. Avulsions often occur in mechanical accidents involving fingers (sometimes referred to as degloving), or, more seriously, may affect the orbit of the eye or the abdominal cavity, exposing the internal viscera. Avulsions are difficult to repair, and no avulsion should ever be considered a minor injury.
- Amputation: Similar to, but distinct from, an avulsion. Whereas an avulsion is characterized by a "flap" of skin being removed, an amputation is characterized by a complete loss of a limb. This can occur at any point on the extremity, and is usually followed by significant arterial bleeding. However, as serious as this injury is, an amputated limb that is cooled and transported to the hospital can sometimes be surgically reattached.
Types of wounds

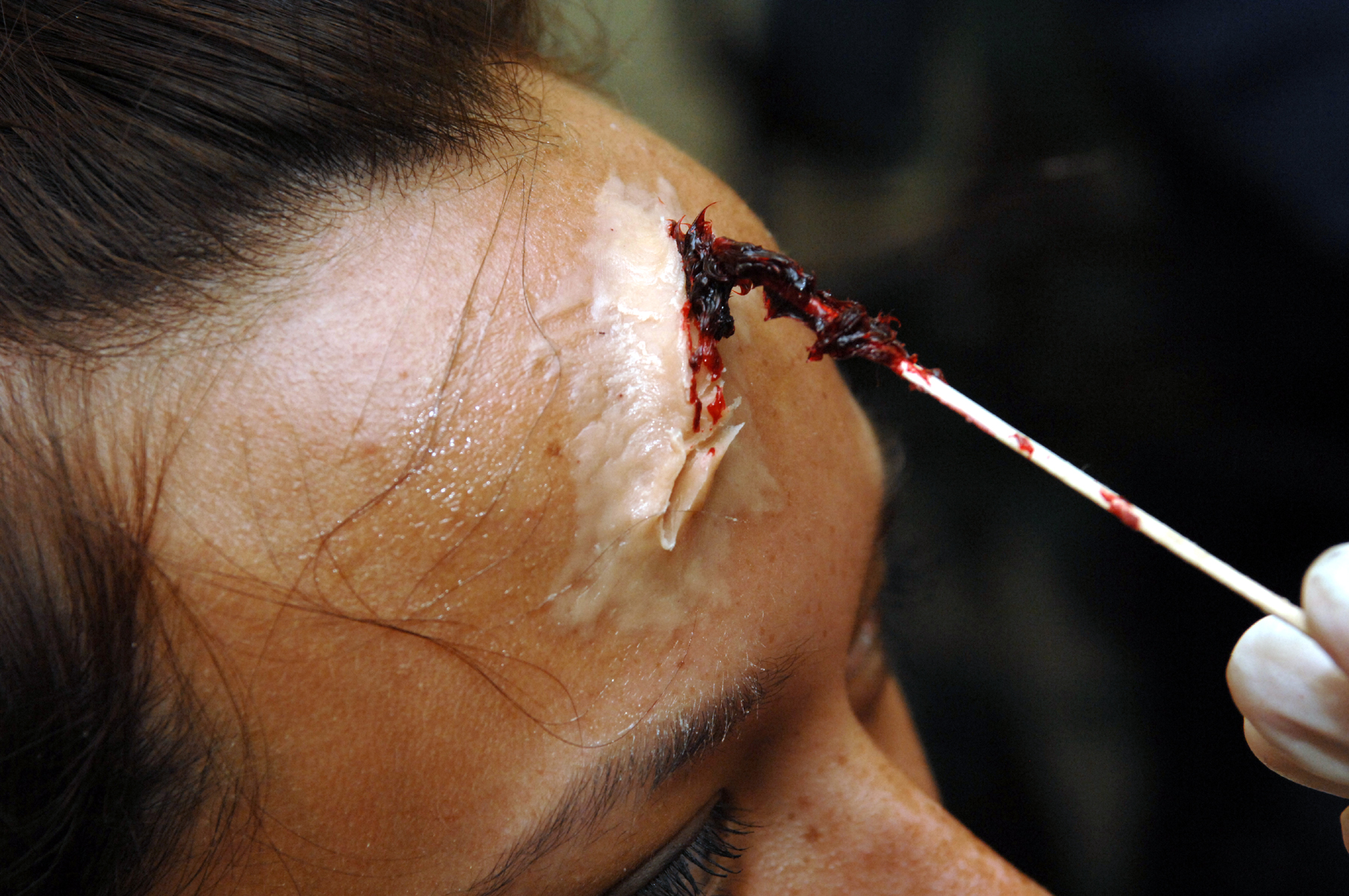
Laceration moulage

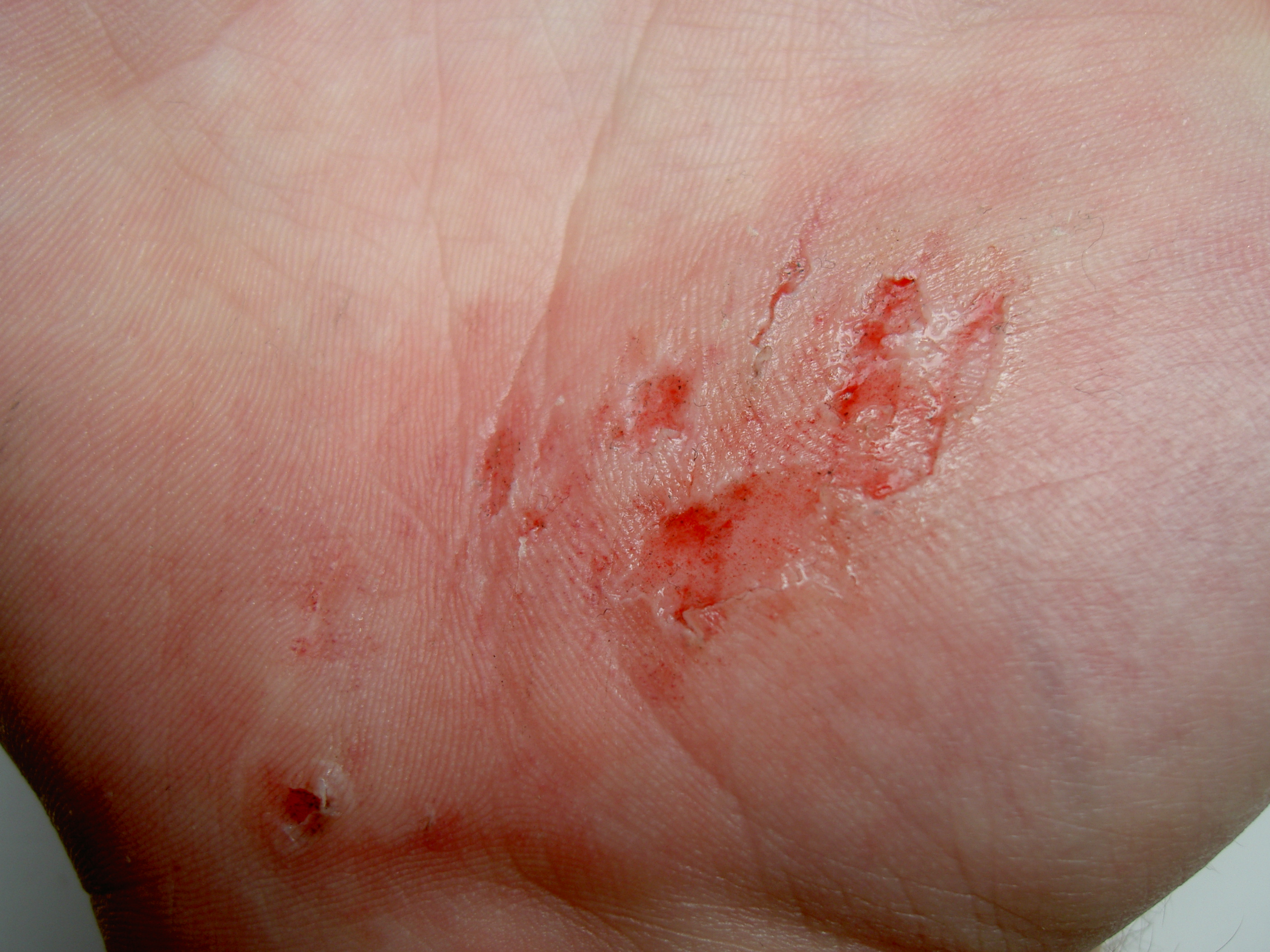
Abrasion on the palm of the hand

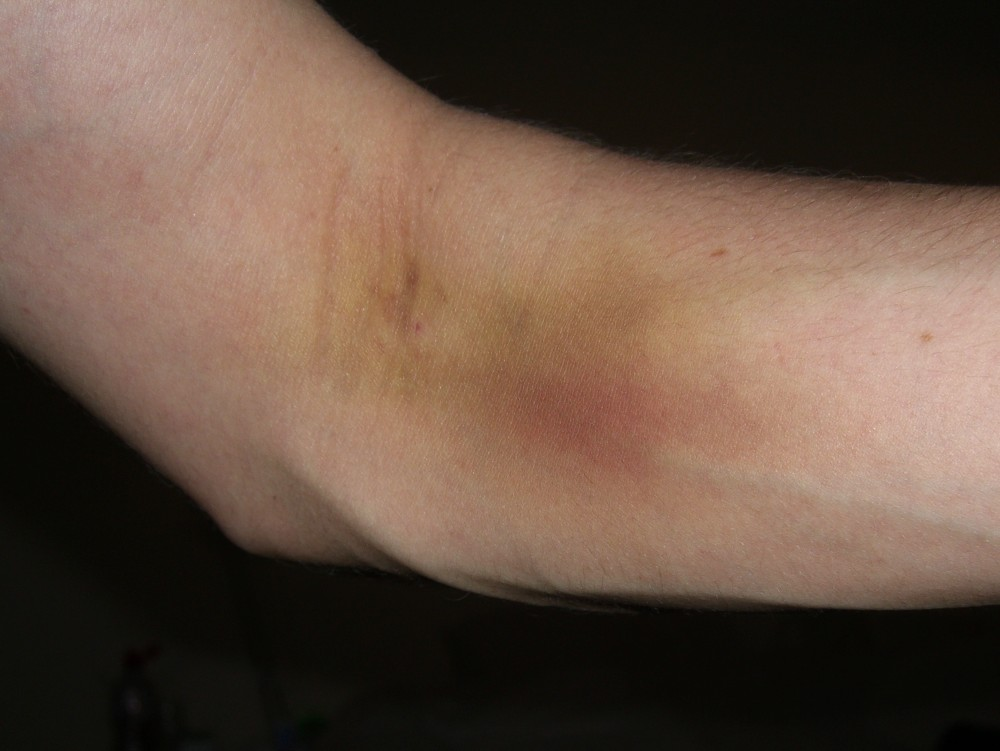
Contusion

== Blood vessels affected ==
External bleeding is generally described in terms of the origin of the blood flow by vessel type. The basic categories of external bleeding are:

- Arterial bleeding: As the name suggests, blood flow originating in an artery. With this type of bleeding, the blood is typically bright red to yellowish in colour, due to the high degree of oxygenation. Blood typically exits the wound in spurts, rather than in a steady flow; the blood spurts out in time with the heartbeat. The amount of blood loss can be copious, and can occur very rapidly.
- Venous bleeding: This blood is flowing from a damaged vein. As a result, it is blackish in colour (due to the lack of oxygen it transports) and flows in a steady manner. Caution is still indicated: while the blood loss may not be arterial, it can still be quite substantial, and can occur with surprising speed without intervention.
- Capillary bleeding: Capillary bleeding usually occurs in superficial wounds, such as abrasions. The colour of the blood may vary somewhat (distal portion of circulation with oxygenated and unoxygenated blood mixing), and generally oozes in small amounts, as opposed to flowing or spurting.

== Wound management ==
The treatment of wounds depends on whether they are external or internal.

- External wounds bleed outside through a skin break. They need an external wound management (read below).
- Internal wounds bleed inside, but some of them can pour blood outside through a natural hole. They need an internal wound management (read below).

== External wound management ==
The type of wound (incision, laceration, puncture, etc.) has a major effect on the way a wound is managed, as does the area of the body affected and presence of any foreign objects in the wound. A serious wound or any complication may require a call to emergency medical services. Any wound requires being disinfected after it stops bleeding. The eyes and other delicate tissue require special products for disinfection.

Main methods of wound management are:

=== Direct pressure ===
Direct pressure is the common method. The pressure on the wound constricts the blood vessels manually, helping to stem blood flow. When applying pressure, the type and direction of the wound may have an effect, for instance, a cut lengthways on the hand would be opened up by closing the hand into a fist, whilst a cut across the hand would be sealed by making a fist. A patient can apply pressure directly to their own wound, if their level of consciousness allows.

Ideally, a barrier, such as sterile, low-adherent gauze should be used between the pressure supplier and the wound, to help reduce chances of infection and help the wound to seal. Third parties assisting a patient are always advised to use protective latex or nitrile medical gloves to reduce risk of infection or contamination passing either way.

Direct pressure can be used with some foreign objects protruding from a wound. Then, padding is applied from each side of the object to push in and seal the wound. The foreign objects are not removed until arriving to a medical center.

=== Elevation ===
Elevation was commonly recommended for the control of haemorrhage. Some protocols continue to include it, but recent studies have failed to find any evidence of its effectiveness and it was removed from the PHTLS guidance in 2006.

=== Cold ===
The cold can add some utility, at least to compress the blood vessels.

=== Pressure points ===
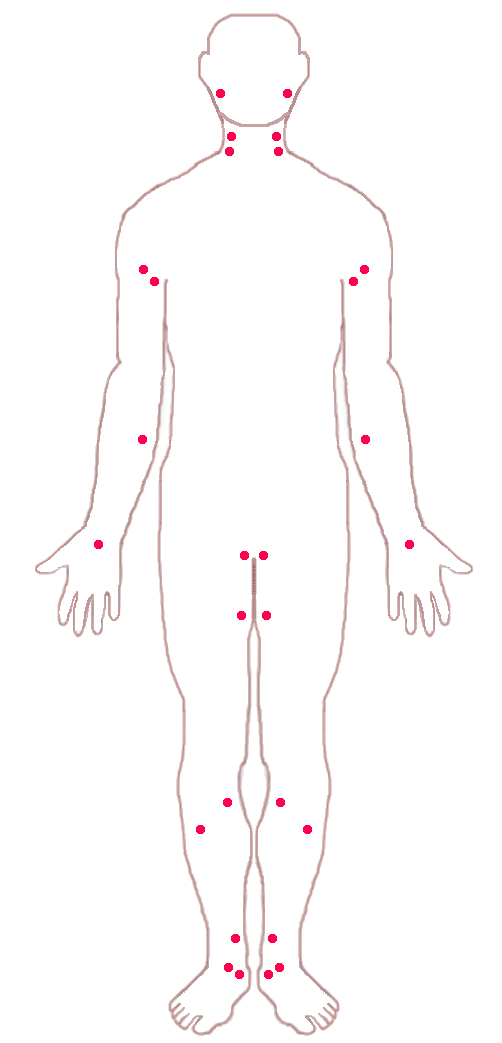
The arterial pressure points

In situations where direct pressure and elevation are either not possible or proving ineffective, and there is a risk of exsanguination, some training protocols advocate the use of pressure points to constrict the major artery that feeds the point of the bleed. This is usually performed at a place where a pulse can be found, such as in the femoral artery. There are significant risks involved in performing pressure point constriction, including necrosis of the area below the constriction, and most protocols give a maximum time for constriction (often around 10 minutes). There is particularly high danger if constricting the carotid artery in the neck, as the brain is sensitive to hypoxia and brain damage can result within minutes of application of pressure. Pressure on the carotid artery can also cause vagal tone induced bradycardia, which can eventually stop the heart. Other dangers in use of a constricting method include rhabdomyolysis, which is a buildup of toxins below the pressure point, which if released back into the main bloodstream may cause kidney failure.

==== Epistaxis ====
Epistaxis, or nosebleed, is a special case, where almost all first aid providers train the use of pressure points. The appropriate point here is on the soft fleshy part of the nose, which should constrict the capillaries sufficiently to stop bleeding, although obviously it does not stop bleeding from the nasopharynx or tear ducts.

=== Tourniquet ===
Another method of achieving constriction of the supplying artery is a tourniquet - a band tied tightly around a limb to restrict blood flow. Tourniquets are routinely used to bring veins to the surface for cannulation, though their use in emergency medicine is more limited. Many armies carry a tourniquet as part of their personal first aid kit.

Improvised tourniquets, in addition to creating potential problems for the ongoing medical management of the patient, usually fail to achieve force enough to adequately compress the arteries of the limb. As a result, they not only fail to stop arterial bleeding, but may actually increase bleeding by impairing venous bloodflow.

=== Clotting agents and medications ===
Some protocols call for the use of clotting accelerating agents, which can be either externally applied as a powder or gel, or pre-dosed in a dressing or as an intravenous injection. These may be particularly useful in situations where the wound is not clotting, which can be due to external factors, such as size of wound, or medical factors such as haemophilia.

For stopping or preventing bleeding in people who do not have haemophilia, there is weak to little evidence to support the use of clotting factors to prevent death. Prophylactic fibrinogen may reduce the risk of bleeding after heart or orthoscopic surgery and prophylactic factor XII may be effective after heart surgery, however, both medications require high-quality randomized clinical trials to understand more about the potential benefits and risks. Recombinant factor VIIa (rFVIIa) is not, as of 2012, supported by the evidence for most cases of major bleeding. Its use brings a significant risk of arterial thrombosis, and therefore it should only be used in clinical trials or with patients with factor VII deficiency.

A new product of this type (Cresilon Hemostatic Gel or CHG, Vetigel in its veterinary version) allows closing great wounds in a few moments.

== Internal wound management ==
Internal wounds (usually to the torso) are harder to deal with than external wounds, although they often have an external cause. The key dangers of internal bleeding include hypovolaemic shock (leading to exsanguination), a tamponade on the heart or a haemothorax on the lung. The aortic aneurysm is a special case where the aorta, the body's main blood vessel, becomes ruptured through an inherent weakness, although exertion, raised blood pressure or sudden movements could cause a sudden catastrophic failure. This is one of the most serious medical emergencies a patient can face, as the only treatment is rapid surgery.

Calling emergency medical services is required for internal bleeding.

Generally, the person should stay in the same position if a head, neck or back injury is suspected (unless either moving is required for safety reasons or to control bleeding).

If signs and symptoms of shock are encountered, the person should be positioned flat on the back (unless the person prefers otherwise for confort and breathing).

Treatment of internal bleeding is beyond the scope of simple first aid, and a person giving first aid should consider it potentially life-threatening. The definitive treatment for internal bleeding is always surgical treatment, and medical advice must be sought urgently for any victim of internal bleeding.

== See also ==
- Bandage
