= Mike Doustdar =

Austrian–Iranian business executive

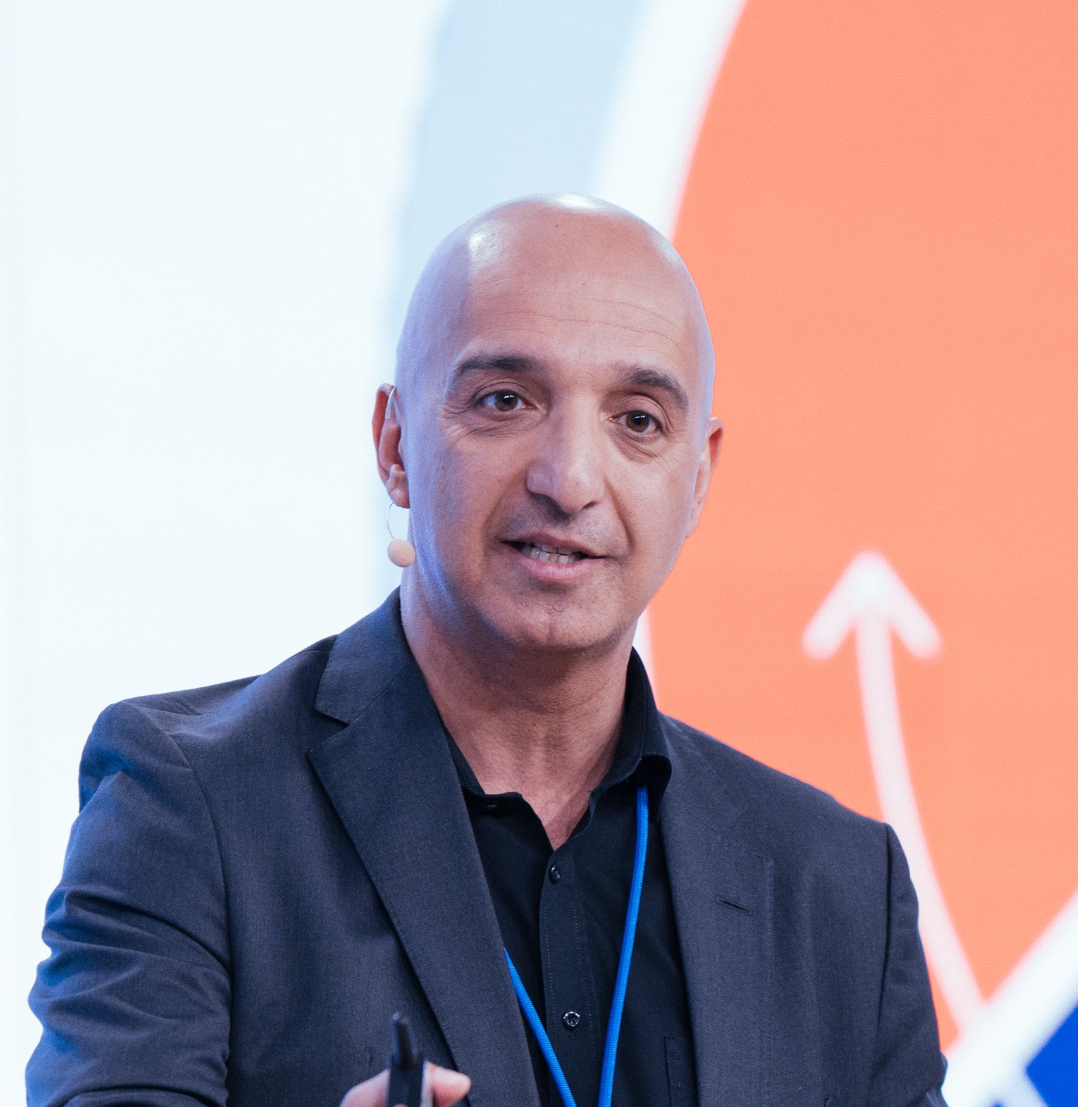
- Mike Doustdar speaking at a Novo event in 2024
- Born: 29 August 1970 (age 56); Iran
- Education: Webster University Vienna, Harvard Business School
- Occupations: Business person, Chief Executive Officer
- Employer: Novo

Maziar Mike Doustdar, also known as Mike Doustdar, (born 29 August 1970) is an Austrian-Iranian business executive who has served as the president and chief executive officer (CEO) of Novo since 7 August 2025. He is the first non-Danish person to lead the company since its founding in 1923.

== Early life and education ==
Mike Doustdar was born in Iran on 29 August 1970 and later grew up in the United States. He studied international business at Webster University in Vienna, Austria, graduating with a bachelor's degree in 1994. In 2012, he completed an executive programme at Harvard Business School.

== Career ==
=== Early career at Novo ===
Mike Doustdar joined Novo in 1992 as an office clerk in Vienna. Over the following decades, he held various positions in finance, logistics, operations, and marketing across multiple regions, including the Near East, Southeast Asia, and the Middle East.

=== International operations ===
In 2014, Mike Doustdar was appointed executive vice president for International Operations, responsible for emerging markets outside Europe and North America. Under his leadership, international sales more than doubled, reaching approximately DKK 112 billion in 2024, supported by a workforce of around 20,000 employees.

=== CEO of Novo ===
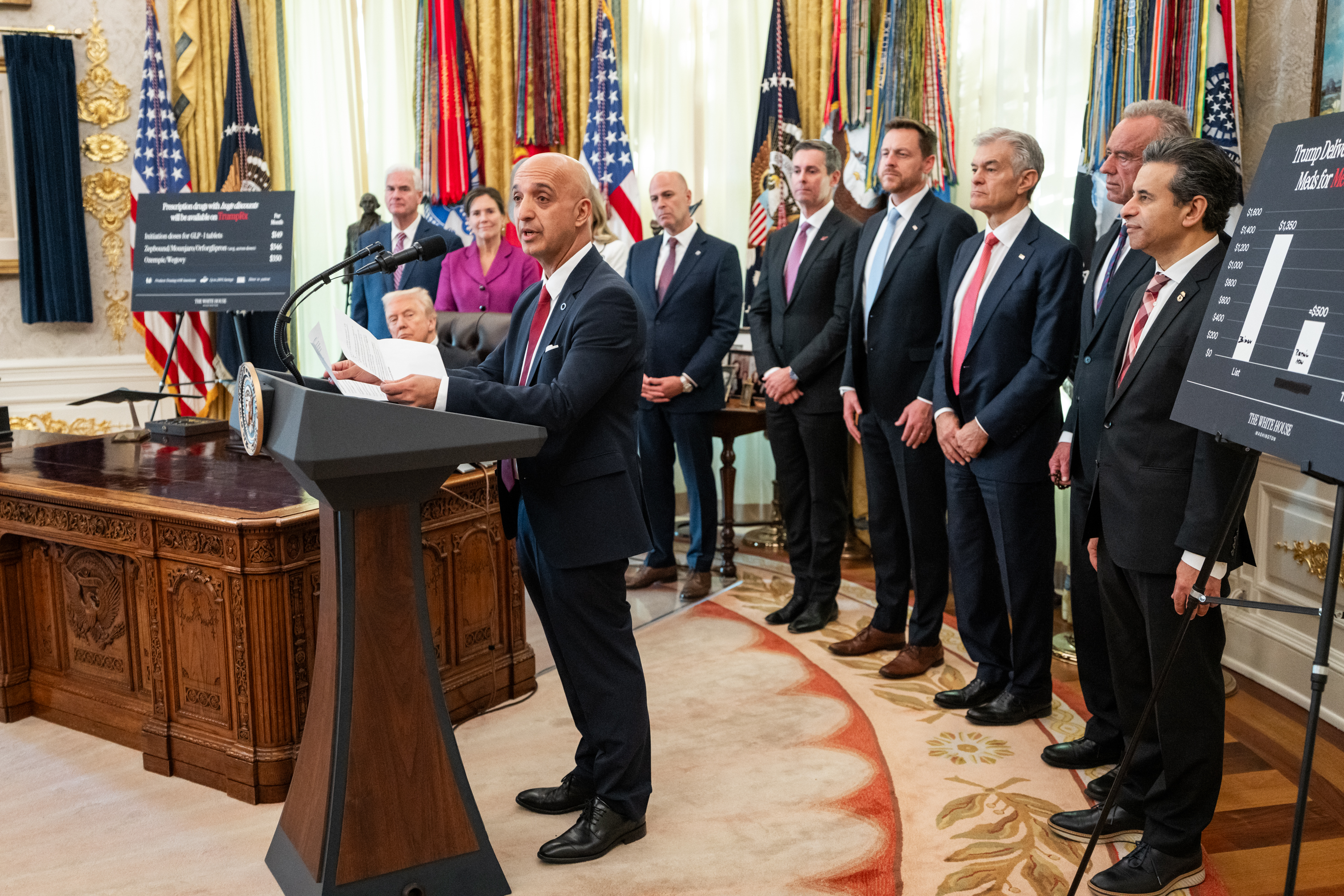
Mike Doustdar during a meeting with Donald Trump in the Oval Office in November 2025

On 29 July 2025, Novo announced Mike Doustdar's appointment as president and CEO, succeeding Lars Fruergaard Jørgensen, effective 7 August 2025. His appointment coincided with the company lowering its financial growth outlook, which led to a decline in share price.

As CEO, Mike Doustdar initiated measures to improve efficiency, including a hiring freeze in non-critical areas and a sharper focus on the company's core therapeutic areas of diabetes and obesity.

Mike Doustdar was included on the 2026 Time 100 list of most influential people in health for his work at Novo.

== Personal life ==
Mike Doustdar is married and has two sons.
