= Harald Pedersen (engineer) =

Danish engineer and industrialist, co-founder of Novo Terapeutisk Laboratorium

- Born: Peter Harald Pedersen; 1878; Øster Hurup, Denmark
- Died: 1966 (aged 87–88); Denmark
- Occupations: Engineer, industrialist
- Known for: Co-founder of Novo Terapeutisk Laboratorium, today Novo Nordisk

Harald Pedersen (born 1878 in Øster Hurup – died 1966) was a Danish engineer and industrialist who, together with his brother Thorvald Pedersen, co-founded the pharmaceutical company Novo Terapeutisk Laboratorium in 1925, predecessor of Novo Nordisk. Their work played a key role in the early Danish insulin industry.

== Early life and education ==
Harald Pedersen was born in Øster Hurup, Denmark, in 1878. He began his working life as an apprentice blacksmith at age 15. He later worked as an engineer at Frederiksberg Electricity Works until 1918, when after a workplace accident in which he lost an eye, he left that employment and became manager of the mechanical workshop at the Laboratory of Zoophysiology, University of Copenhagen.

== Career ==
In the early 1920s, Harald Pedersen worked with Nobel laureate August Krogh (and others) at the Laboratory of Zoophysiology; his mechanical workshop produced machines used in early insulin production.

In autumn 1923, his brother Thorvald was hired by Nordisk Insulinlaboratorium to analyse chemical processes in insulin production; Harald also worked at Nordisk.

== Founding of Novo Terapeutisk Laboratorium ==
In 1924 a dispute occurred at Nordisk: Thorvald was fired by Hans Christian Hagedorn, co-founder of Nordisk, and Harald resigned in solidarity. In February 1925 the brothers formally founded Novo Terapeutisk Laboratorium. The company developed a dedicated insulin production facility and a specialty injection device (the "Novo Syringe").

== Work ==
- Development of dedicated machinery for insulin extraction and purification at the Zoophysiology Laboratory workshop.
- Design and implementation of early insulin delivery technologies (the "Novo Syringe" for self-injection).
- Co-development of Insulin Novo, marketed by Novo Terapeutisk in the mid-1920s.

== Family ==
Pedersen was the son of the village schoolteacher Niels Christian Pedersen and Karen Marie (Ane) Pedersen and one of ten children; he was the elder brother of Thorvald Andreas Pedersen (1887–1961), with whom he co-founded Novo Terapeutisk Laboratorium. He married twice: he was widowed in 1916 when his first wife died in childbirth with their fifth child; a few years later he married Ane Thomine Thomsen, and they had a daughter, Gudrun. Gudrun married Knud Hallas-Møller, who later succeeded Harald in leading Novo; their daughter Lise married Mads Øvlisen, who later served as CEO of Novo Nordisk and helped bring about the 1989 merger of Novo and Nordisk.

== Legacy ==
Harald Pedersen's engineering contributions helped developing the early Danish insulin industry. He and his brother also established the Novo Foundation in 1951, of which Harald became a life-member of the Board. The Pedersen brothers founded Novo Terapeutisk Laboratorium in 1925 and competed with Nordisk until the 1989 merger that created Novo Nordisk.
