= Johannes Bæch =

Danish painter and draughtsman

Johannes Emilius Bæch (28 January 1920 – 27 June 2002) was a Danish painter and draughtsman.

== Biography ==
Johannes Bæch moved from his hometown Hvilsom to Viborg in 1930. In 1937 he took Realeksamen (exam taken after 10 years of primary school) from Latinskole (The Latin School). He was employed at Viborg Katedralskole (Viborg Cathedral School) from 1967 to 1985 as a teacher in the subjects of art and drawing.

His art career started in 1939 when he was a 19-year-old student at the art academy at Charlottenborg. He finished his education in 4 years. His debut was at Charlottenborg Spring Exhibition in 1943.

Johannes Bæch was chosen as Årets Viborgenser (the year's Viborg citizen) in the year 2000 through Viborg Bladet (The Viborg paper). In 2001 he was picked out by "Bishop Gunnar's Guild" as "honorary prior" for his efforts to Viborg.

Bæch is buried at Viborg Kirkegård (Viborg cemetery).
