= Thorvald Pedersen =

Danish pharmacist and chemist (1887–1961)

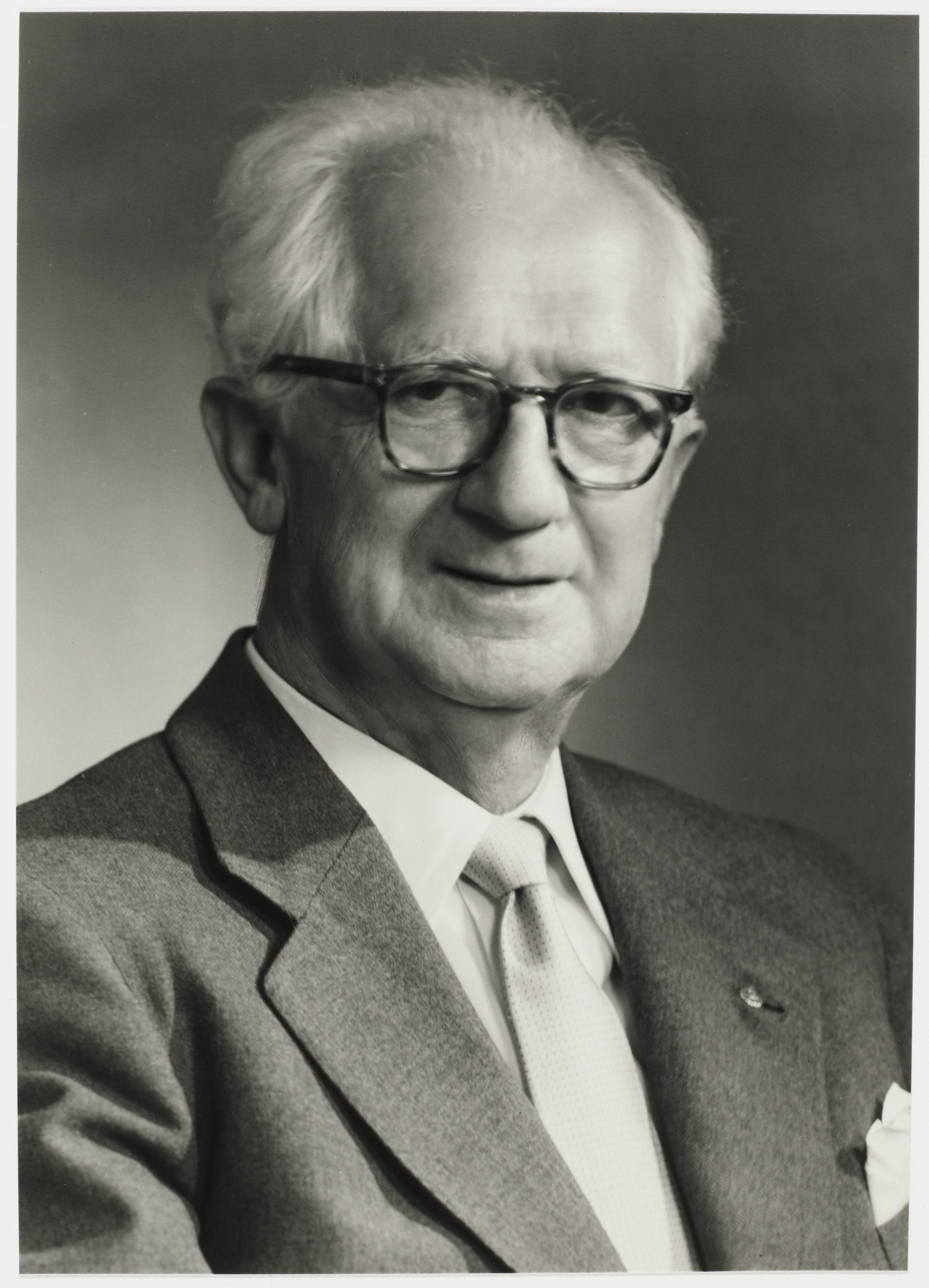
- Born: Thorvald Andreas Pedersen; 1887; Øster Hurup, Denmark
- Died: 1961 (aged 73–74); Gentofte, Denmark
- Occupations: Pharmacist, chemist, industrialist
- Known for: Co-founder of Novo Terapeutisk Laboratorium, today Novo Nordisk

Thorvald Andreas Pedersen (5 August 1887 – 19 September 1961) was a Danish pharmacist, chemist, and industrialist. Together with his brother Harald Pedersen, he co-founded the pharmaceutical company Novo Terapeutisk Laboratorium in 1925, a predecessor of Novo Nordisk.

== Early life and education ==
Thorvald Pedersen was born in Øster Hurup, Denmark, in 1887, the youngest of ten children in a schoolteacher's family. Fascinated by botany and natural sciences, he trained as a pharmacist in Hobro and graduated in 1910. After further studies in chemistry, he worked at Otto Mønsteds Margarinefabrik in Aarhus and from 1918 to 1923 as an analytical chemist at Dansk Sojakagefabrik in Copenhagen.

== Career ==
In the autumn of 1923 Pedersen was hired by Nordisk Insulinlaboratorium to assist in the chemical analysis and purification of insulin, which was being newly produced under the direction of Hans Christian Hagedorn and August Krogh. A disagreement with Hagedorn led to him being fired in spring 1924. Out of solidarity, his brother Harald, who worked as a machinist and engineer at Krogh's laboratory, resigned as well.

== Founding of Novo Terapeutisk Laboratorium ==
In February 1925 the Pedersen brothers founded Novo Terapeutisk Laboratorium as an enterprise for insulin production. While Harald oversaw mechanical and production engineering, Thorvald led the laboratory's chemical and analytical work, developing purification processes for insulin. Their first product, Insulin Novo, reached the Danish market in 1925. As head of the laboratory (laboratorieforstander), Thorvald directed Novo's scientific research during the late 1920s and 1930s and promoted close cooperation between laboratory and production teams. He promoted social and personnel improvements within the company.

== Work ==
- Developed and optimized insulin extraction and purification methods at Novo.
- Co-created Insulin Novo (1925), the company's first commercial insulin product.
- Promoted staff welfare and social reform within Novo's management structure.
- Served as chair of the Novo Foundation from its creation in 1951 and as a life member of its board.

== Family ==
Pedersen married Elisa Mathilde Lyngbye Aggerholm on 28 March 1923. He died in Gentofte on 19 September 1961 and was buried at Ordrup Cemetery (Ordrup kirkegård).

== Legacy ==
Pedersen led laboratory chemical and analytical work at Novo Terapeutisk Laboratorium after 1925; together with his brother he co-founded the company, which first competed with Nordisk and later became part of Novo Nordisk after their 1989 merger.
