= Lars Rebien Sørensen =

Danish businessman (born 1954)

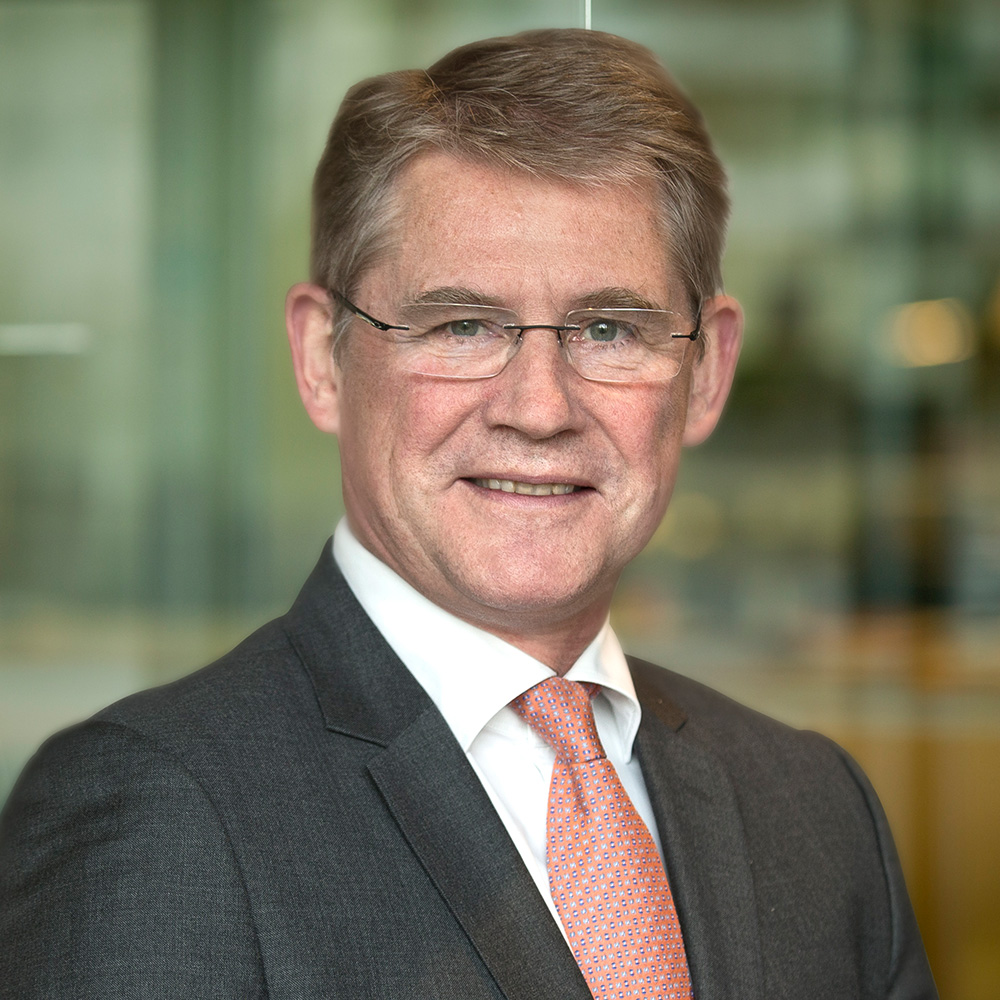
- Born: October 10, 1954 (age 72); Hvidovre, Denmark
- Education: Copenhagen Business School (BSc); Royal Veterinary and Agricultural University (MSc)
- Occupation: Businessman
- Title: Chair of Novo Nordisk Foundation; Chair of Novo
- Spouse: Charlotte Idin Sørensen
- Children: 3

Lars Rebien Sørensen (born 10 October 1954) is a Danish businessman and former CEO of the pharmaceutical company Novo and current chairman of the board at the Novo Nordisk Foundation and at Novo.

== Biography ==
=== Education ===
Lars Rebien Sørensen was born on 10 October 1954 in Hvidovre, and educated at Brøndby High School and has a bachelor's degree in international finance from the Copenhagen Business School. He is a MSc forestry graduate from the Royal Veterinary and Agricultural University, now part of the University of Copenhagen (1981).

=== Career ===
Sørensen was employed by Novo in 1982 within marketing of enzymes, having joined right out of military service. He then became sales and marketing director for the enzyme department in 1989. He joined the Group Executive Board of Novo in 1994 and was handed the responsibility of the medical department of Novo. In 2000 the enzyme department was de-merged from Novo and became its own entity, Novozymes (later known as Novonesis), and Lars Rebien Sørensen took over the position of CEO for Novo, after Mads Øvlisen. In January 2017, Lars Rebien Sørensen was succeeded as CEO by Lars Fruergaard Jørgensen. As part of his severance package, Sørensen received a "golden handshake" of 65.7 million DKK (approx. US$10.7 million). His annual salary in 2016 was 22.7 million DKK (approx. US$3.7 million).

He was CEO at Novo from 2000 until the end of 2016 and was replaced by Lars Fruergaard Jørgensen at the beginning of 2017.

Sørensen took on the position as chairman at Novo Nordisk Foundation on 1 July 2018. He has also been chairman of the board at Novo Holdings. The Novo Nordisk Foundation is one of the largest foundations in the world and the foundation which is the majority shareholder in Novo, Novonesis and NNIT (Novo Group) along with investments in more than 80 other companies within the life-sciences sector through its 100% owned subsidiary Novo Holdings.

Sørensen was a representative in the Danish Central bank and he holds a seat at the board of directors in Axcel Management A/S, Thermo Fisher Scientific Inc. (USA), Essity AB (Sweden), Jungbunzlauer Suisse AG (Switzerland) and Novo Holdings.

==== Other activities ====
Sørensen joined the life sciences faculty of the University of Copenhagen as an adjunct professor in 2007.

==== Board memberships ====
Sørensen currently holds the following board member seats:

- Novo Nordisk Foundation – chairman of the board
- Novo – chairman of the board
- Axcel Management A/S – Vice Chairman of the board
- Thermo Fisher Scientific Inc. (USA) – Board member
- Essity AB (Sweden) – Board member
- Jungbunzlauer Suisse AG (Switzerland) – Board member
- Ferring Pharmaceuticals – chairman of the board

=== Personal life ===
Sørensen is married to Charlotte Idin Sørensen, and the couple have three adult children. They spend a significant part of the year at their home in Tuscany, Italy.

An avid long-distance runner, Sørensen has completed marathons in Berlin and New York City and the 90-kilometre Vasaloppet in Sweden.

== Recognition ==
- Sørensen was appointed a Knight of the Legion of Honour by the French government in 2005.
- He was awarded the "World's Best CEO" by Harvard Business Review in 2015 and 2016.
- In 2025, Lars Rebien Sørensen received PwC Denmark's Business Executive of the Year award 2025. The distinction is presented annually to executives in Danish business who have demonstrated notable leadership, strategic influence, and impact on society.
