= Hagedorn Prize =

Medical research prize

The Hagedorn Prize is an annual award within the field of medical research, specifically recognizing outstanding contributions to diabetes research and endocrinology. Named after Hans Christian Hagedorn, a renowned Danish scientist and co-founder of Nordisk Insulinlaboratorium (now part of Novo Nordisk), the prize celebrates achievements in the understanding and treatment of diabetes.

Hagedorn's work significantly advanced the quality of insulin production and diabetes care, making this award a tribute to his legacy in the field. The Hagedorn Prize is recognised as the most prestigious award in Internal medicine in Denmark.

== Background ==
=== History ===
The Hagedorn Prize was established by the Danish Society of Internal Medicine in 1966 to recognize the contribution to medical science made by Hans Christian Hagedorn (1888–1971). The prize is awarded at the society's annual general meeting.

Initially, the Hagedorn Prize received its endowment from a distinct foundation, funded by contributions from Nordisk Insulinlaboratorium, with the Board of the Danish Society for Internal Medicine serving as its governing body. However, by 2008, the foundation's resources were deemed inadequate to sustain a meaningful award. Consequently, the remaining capital was transferred to the Novo Nordisk Foundation, which subsequently assumed the responsibility of bestowing the Hagedorn Prize, while maintaining the ongoing involvement of the Society. The recipient of the prize is determined by the society's board, relying on recommendations provided by its members.

==== About the Danish Society of Internal Medicine ====
The Danish Society of Internal Medicine, comprising nearly 4,500 members, serves as an overarching body for the nine internal medicine specialties within Denmark. Its objectives include the advancement of scientific research in internal medicine and the facilitation of ongoing education for specialist physicians in the discipline. Established in 1916, the Society operates with a board of directors composed of nine members, appointed by the boards of each respective internal medicine specialty.

=== Award ===
The Hagedorn Prize includes a monetary component, designed to support the ongoing research of the recipient. In addition, awardees are presented with a medal and a certificate recognizing their contributions to advancing diabetes research and treatment. The prize is intended not only to honor individuals for their past achievements but also to encourage further innovation and research in diabetes care.

== Recipients ==
List of recipients of The Hagedorn Prize

Year	Recipient	Year	Recipient	Year	Recipient
2023	Else Marie Skjøde Damsgaard	2002	Hans Henrik Parving	1983	Povl Riis
2022	Jens Bukh	2001	Hans Ibsen	1982	Niels Tygstrup
2021	Hans Carl Hasselbalch	2000	Ove B. Schaffalitzky	1981	Niels Juel Christensen
2020	Michael Kjær	1999	Hans Ørskov	1980	Kurt Iversen
2019	Hans Erik Bøtker	1998	Jens Kampmann	1979	Henrik R. Wulff
2018	Asbjørn Mohr Drewes	1997	Jørgen Fischer Hansen	1978	Knud Olesen
2017	Jens Dilling Lundgren	1996	Vagn Andersen	1977	Ib Lorenzen
2016	Jørgen Vestbo	1995	Niels Ebbe Hansen	1976	Jørgen Hess Thaysen
2015	Oluf Borbye Pedersen	1994	Vibeke Binder	1975	Jørgen Pedersen
2014	Bo Feldt-Rasmussen	1993	Anders Frøland	1974	Stig Jarnum
2013	Lars Køber	1992	Jens Mølholm	1973	Mogens Bjørneboe
2012	Henrik Toft Sørensen	1991	Tage Astrup	1972	Knud Lundbæk
2011	Ulla Feldt-Rasmussen	1991	Allan Erslev	1971	Svend-Aage Kiilman
2010	Torsten Toftegaard Nielsen	1990	Leif Mosekilde	1970	Viggo Faber
2009	Sten Madsbad	1989	Thorkild I. A. Sørensen	1970	Gunnar Bendixen
2008	Gorm Boje Jensen	1989	Marianne Schroll	1969	Michael Schwartz
2007	Hendrik Vilstrup	1988	Carl Erik Mogensen	1968	Villy Posborg Petersen
2006	Allan Flyvbjerg	1987	Bent Harvald	1967	Laurids Korsgaard Christensen
2005	Henning Beck-Nielsen	1986	Halfdan Mahler	1966	Tage Hilden
2004	Bente Klarlund Pedersen	1985	Kresten Mellemgaard		
2003	Heine Høi Hansen	1984	Jørn Nerup		
