= Webster Vienna Private University =

University in Austria

Coordinates: 48°13′25″N 16°25′26″E

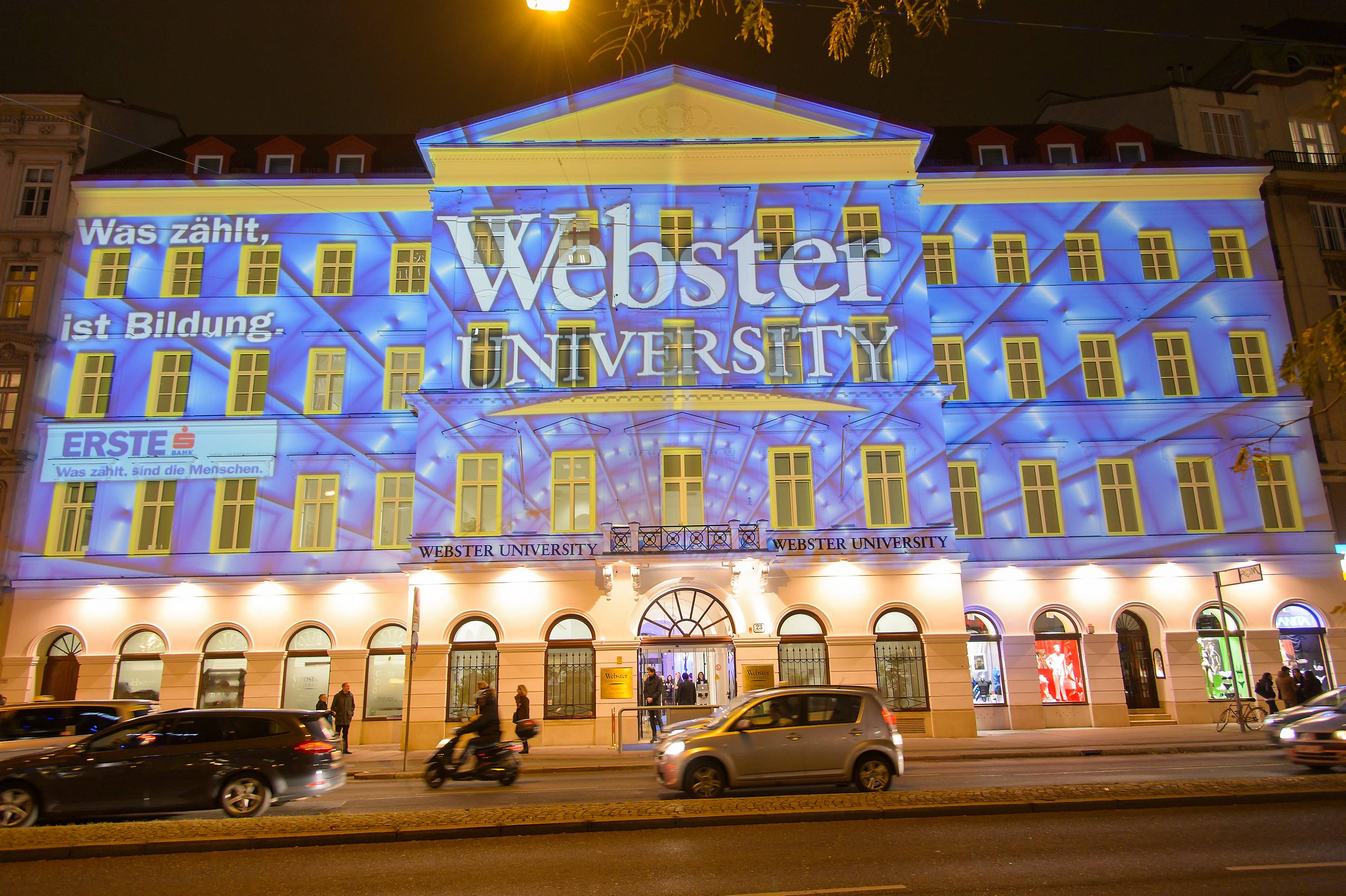
- Grand Opening Webster Vienna Private University's new campus in 2014
- Type: Private, Non-Profit
- Established: 1981; 45 years ago
- President: Dr. Julian Z. Schuster
- Director: Dr. Samuel R. Schubert
- Academic staff: 11:1 Student-Faculty Ratio
- Students: 500+
- Undergraduates: 350+
- Postgraduates: 175+
- Other students: 60+ study abroad per semester
- Location: Vienna, Austria
- Colors: Navy, gold, and white
- Website: webster.ac.at

Webster Vienna Private University is a private American university in Vienna, Austria housed in Palais Wenkheim. Founded in 1981, it is one of the oldest private institutions of higher learning in Austria. Webster Vienna is known for being the first university in Austria to offer dual US-Austrian degree accreditation, the first to teach exclusively in English, and the first to offer an accredited Master of Business Administration program in 1985.

It is affiliated with Webster University in St. Louis, USA, but remains a distinct and separate institution within the wider Webster University Network across Europe and Asia. The university follows a Humboldtian model of higher education in learning structure, integrating faculty research into teaching.

== History ==
Webster University was founded in St. Louis, Missouri, USA in 1915. After being impressed by a visit to the Webster Geneva campus, Vienna mayor Leopold Gratz invited Webster University to open a campus in Vienna as the country’s first and only American university beginning in 1981.

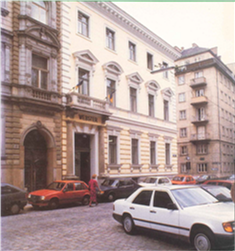
Webster Vienna at Marokkanergasse in 1991

Originally located on the Schubertring in Vienna’s first district, the campus soon moved to Marokkanergasse, occupying a full three-story building. During this time in 1985, Webster Vienna became the first institution to offer an accredited MBA program in Austria. The university also became the first university in Austria to be run by a woman; Elisabeth Chopin served as Webster Vienna’s director from 1988 to 1999.

Due to a growing student population, in 1996, the campus relocated a second time to the 22nd district, Donaustadt. In the same year, Webster Vienna granted honorary doctorates to Kardinal König and former Austrian-Jewish Holocaust survivor, Simon Wiesenthal. Later, in 2007, the university also granted an honorary degree to acclaimed social psychologist Philip Zimbardo (of Stanford University near Palo Alto, California).

In 2001, Webster Vienna became the first and only American university to receive the Austrian private university accreditation.

In fall 2014, Webster Vienna moved to its current, modern campus in the historic Palais Wenkheim close to the city center. The newly renovated building provides technical equipment on more than 5,000 m² (or 55,000 sq ft). On 15 October 2015 until the end of June 2016 Bernd Marin took over the director's chair from Arthur Hirsh, who had served for 15 years. Johannes Pollak took over as new director as of July 2016.

== Academics ==
At Webster Vienna Private University programs in several departments are offered with all courses being taught in English.

Undergraduate programs

- Business Administration (BS)
- International Relations (BA)
- International Organizations and Diplomacy (Certificate)
- Bachelor of Laws (LL.B.)
- Management (BA)
- Media Communications (BA)
- Psychology (BA)

Graduate programs

- International Relations (MA)
- Marketing (MSc)
- Master of Business Administration (MBA)
- Psychology (MA)

=== Global Citizenship Program ===
Each student who enters the undergraduate degree program is required to complete Webster's Global Citizenship Program. The program aims at teaching students how to confront global issues and the quickly-changing society of the 21st century. The program criteria include six knowledge areas (Roots of Cultures, Social Systems & Human Behavior, Physical & Natural World, Global Understanding, Arts Appreciation, and Quantitative Literacy) and five skill areas (Critical Thinking, Oral Communication, Ethical Reasoning, Written Communication, Intercultural Competence) each with a variety of courses students can choose from.

== Reputation ==
According to various university ranking sites Webster Vienna Private University has been increasing its reputation in recent years. In 2026 Edurank placed the institution in 37th of 71 universities in Austria and 13th of 23 universities in Vienna. As of 2026, Top Universities put the university as 180th place in Western Europe and in the 701st-900th place globally.

The university gives acceptance and scholarship preference to students with an International Baccalaureate. Webster Vienna does not publish acceptance results, indicating that the competitiveness may depend on the program. However, the university does indicate that there is, in fact, a maximum in-take per degree. As of 2026, the maximum in-take per year for the BA International Relations program was 35, with smaller BA programs such as strategic communications accepting even fewer at a maximum of 25.

Controversies in the parent institution in St Louis have in recent years come to light. Amid financial issues in 2023 the faculty senate passed a no confidence vote against the main campus's leadership for financial mismanagement and leadership compensation values. In another, but separate, situation in 2024 a wire fraud case was brought against former IT Director Ronald Simpson, who later pleaded guilty. These situations, however, have no known link to the Vienna campus.

Webster Vienna Private University also maintains well known and prestigious private scholarship programs, in particular with Borealis.

== Student Body, Student Life & Traditions ==
=== Student Body ===
Student Nationality	Population
Eastern Europe	28%
Western Europe	25%
Southern Europe	16%
Middle East	13%
Americas	12%
Africa	3%
Northern Europe	2%
Asia/Pacific	1%

The student body consists of over 500 students from 70 countries. About 20% of the student population comes from the local Austrian community and 10% from the United States.

=== Student Organizations ===
Currently in charge of student affairs, complaints and advocacy vis-à-vis the board is the Student Government Association (SGA), which works closely with (and within the legal parameters of the) Österreichishe Hochschülerinnen und Hochschülershaft. As such the organization is made up of an executive team (including a President and Vice Presidents), several "mandates" (typically senior members), and several specialized members in charge of issues such as events, department communication, and finances. The association also runs a contact box on their website.

The campus also has a multitude of student clubs. Students are allowed to establish their own student organizations if they would like to participate in a special interest group which hasn't already been organized. Funding is secured through affirmation by Student Government Association. As of 2026 student clubs range from those on socialization (buzz club, social club), hobby/interest based (book club, debate club), group representation (LGBTQ+), sports (basketball, volleyball, tennis), to pre-professional clubs (psychology club, IR and diplomacy club, finance society).

Webster Vienna also has chapters of the Delta Mu Delta and Sigma Iota Rho honors societies.

To facilitate these student initiatives as well as many others, the WebsterLEADS program offers guidance and resources to further develop students' leadership skills and ideas. In addition, the LEADs program offers a certification after graduation and offers training through workshops, leadership tasks, and volunteering.

=== Graduation ===
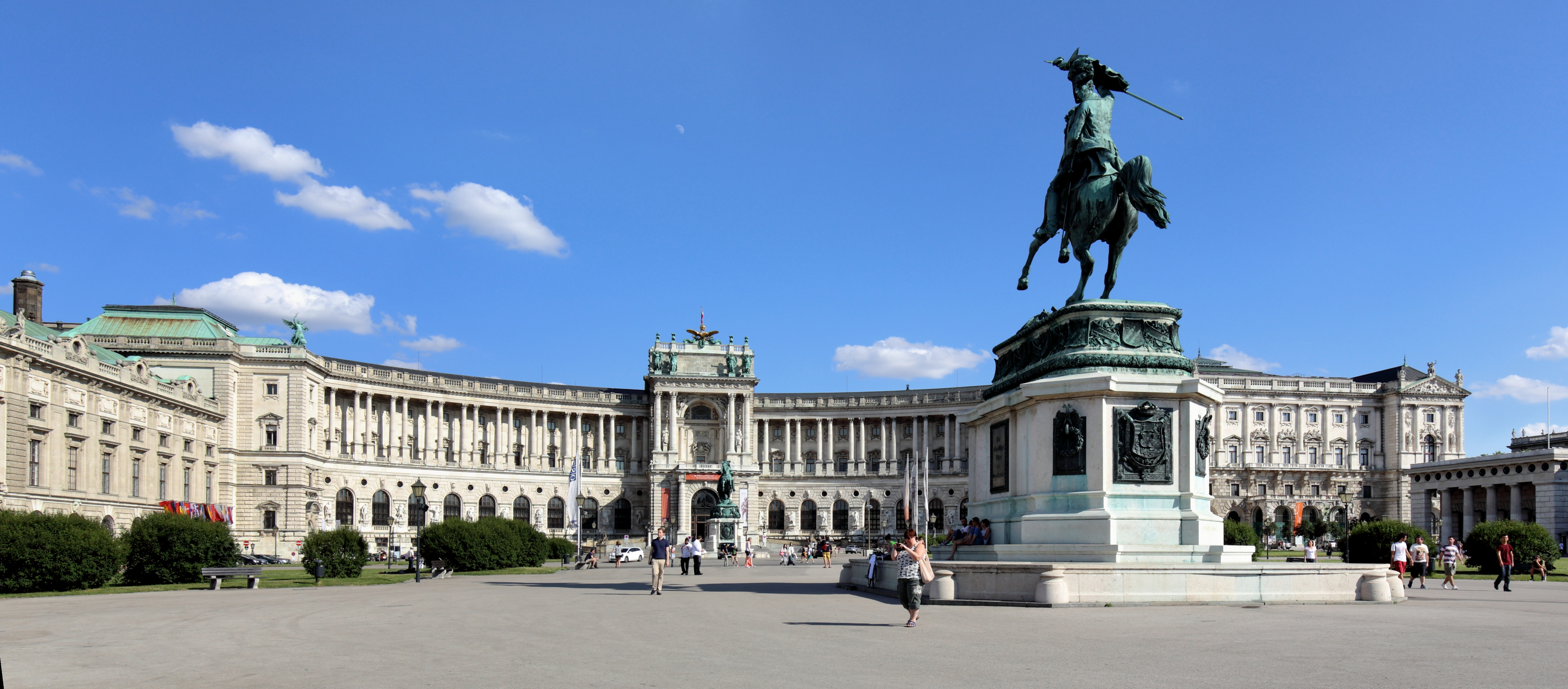
The Hofburg, where WVPU graduation ceremonies have historically taken place.

Every May, Bachelor and Master’s graduates complete their Webster education with a traditional American graduation ceremony, complete with the cap and gown academic dress. The graduation ceremony takes place in the Hofburg. Each year, the ceremony is attended by a notable guest commencement speaker, who prepares a special address to the graduates for the occasion.

== Institutional Partnerships and Connections ==
=== Webster University Network ===
As a member of the Webster University Network, Webster Vienna students have the option of studying abroad at any of Webster's other international campuses. Currently the European network the includes Webster Geneva Campus, Webster Leiden, Webster Athens and Webster Tbilisi. In addition to the main parent university in St Louis, there is also Webster Tashkent, in Uzbekistan. As one university system, the international connections Webster has worldwide provides an easy path for their students to study abroad. Students who choose to study abroad have the security of all courses transferring, plus the benefit of choosing a flexible length of stay of between eight weeks to over a year within the same university.

=== Study Abroad and Connections (non-Network) ===
Webster Vienna, however, also Webster holds its own partnerships with a few universities worldwide including Kansai University in Osaka, Japan and The Universidad Autónoma de Guadalajara in Guadalajara, Mexico. As part of the Eurasmus+ program Webster Vienna also has partnerships with both the Metropolitan University Prague and University of New York in Prague in the Czech Republic; Eötvös Loránd University in Hungary; University of Trieste in Italy; Vilnius Gediminas Technical University in Lithuania; and University of Las Palmas de Gran Canaria in Spain.

Several individual students have also attended Harvard University's Visiting Undergraduate Program while attending Webster Vienna.

=== IAEA (WIN) and OPEC ===
Webster Vienna Private University has had a recent focus on connections with International organization's involved in energy. For several years Webster Vienna has hosted and sponsored the International Atomic Energy Agency's Women in Nuclear chapter host the Vienna Science and Engineering Fair. The university also has institutional links with OPEC, particularly through student recommendations for internship placement. Before his passing in 2022, OPEC Secretary General Mohammed Barkindo also sat on WVPU's advisory board.

== Notable alumni ==
The Webster alumni network includes over 180,000 alumni worldwide and nearly 3,000 alumni graduated from the Webster Vienna campus. Webster Vienna hosts its own alumni chapter which was established in 2005. As of 2026 it is currently run by Stefano Cantini. Notable alumni include:

- H.E. Nararya S. Soeprapto: Deputy Secretary General of ASEAN
- Mike Doustdar: President and CEO of Novo
- Gernot Mittendorfer: CFO Erste Bank
- Peter Harold: CEO of Hypo Noe Group
- Juhn Jai-hong: South Korean film director
- Vladimir Ivković: neuroscientist and physiologist at Harvard Medical School and Boston University

== Accreditation's & Recognition's ==
Webster Vienna Private University is accredited in the United States by the Higher Learning Commission at both the undergraduate and graduate levels. Since 2001, the university has also held accreditation with the Austrian Accreditation Council as an Austrian private university. Furthermore, all Business and Management programs at Webster Vienna are accredited by the Accreditation Council for Business Schools and Programs (ACBSP).

Additional recognitions given to Webster Vienna include the following:

• CFA (Chartered Financial Analyst) Institute has recognized Webster Vienna's MSc in Finance for incorporating at least 70% of the CFA Program Candidate Body of Knowledge.

• Webster Vienna is the first and only university in Austria to be recognized by the Institute of Chartered Accountants in England and Wales (ICAEW) as a Partner in Learning.

== Research ==
The Webster Vienna research faculty regularly publishes literature within academic journals, books and conference proceedings. Since the mid 2010s there has been a dramatic uptick in published research. As of 2026 faculty at the University have produced over 400 publications with over 10,500 citations. The topics of research emphasized at the institution are the following:

The University also hosts a Research Institute for Interdisciplinary Ethnography on Violence, Gender, Sexuality and Justice.

=== Psychology ===
• Psychological/behavioral decision making • Psychological aspects of counseling and psychotherapy (e.g., psychotherapy, organizational psychology, coaching, supervision, consulting, teams, groups, and leadership)

=== Business & Management ===
• Management information systems • Marketing • Strategic management • Supply chain management

=== International Relations ===
• Political representation beyond the nation-state • Participation of national parliaments in European affairs • European Energy Policy • Political Violence • Trends in Terrorism and Counter-Terrorism
