= Lars Fruergaard Jørgensen =

Danish businessman (born 1966)

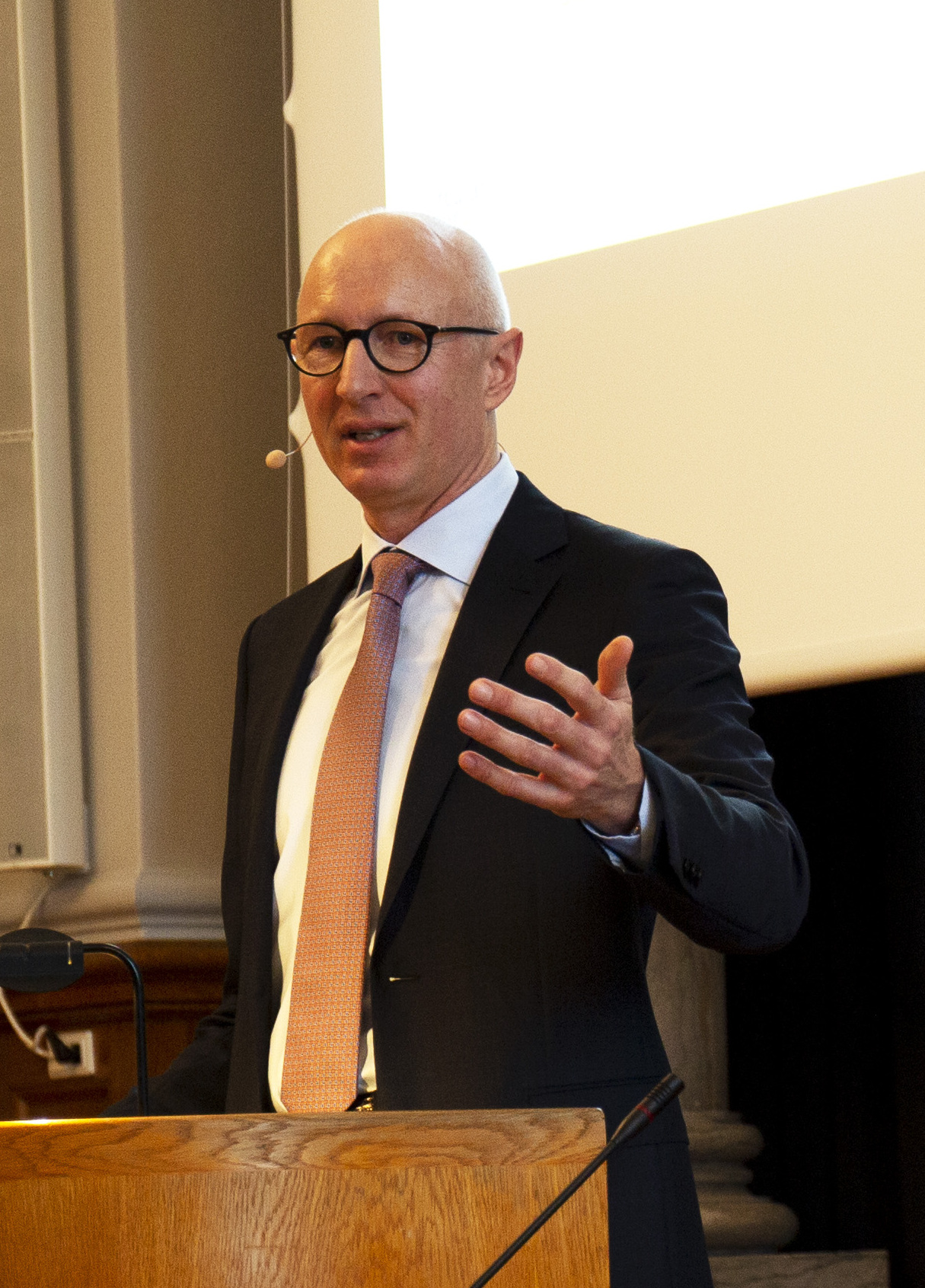
- Born: 29 November 1966 (age 59); Viborg, Denmark
- Occupation: Businessman
- Employer: Novo (1994–2025)

Lars Fruergaard Jørgensen (born 29 November 1966) is a Danish businessman who was the chief executive officer (CEO) of Novo between January 2017 and August 2025.

== Early life and education ==
Jørgensen was educated at the Cathedral School of Viborg. In 1991 Jørgensen earned an MSc in Finance & Business Administration from Aarhus University.

== Career ==
In 1991, Jørgensen joined Novo as an economist in Health Care, Economy & Planning. He was appointed as vice-president for IT and Corporate Development in 2004. In January 2013, he was appointed as executive vice president and chief information officer. In November 2014 oversaw Corporate People & Organization and Business Assurance.

In September 2016, it was announced that Jørgensen would succeed Lars Rebien Sørensen as CEO of Novo, after Sørensen had announced his departure at the end of the year. In January 2017, Jørgensen was appointed president and chief executive officer.

Jørgensen has been President of the European Federation of Pharmaceutical Industries and Associations and member of the Board of Directors at Danmarks Nationalbank. He has also served as a member of several company boards of directors, including Innate Pharma in France, Harno Invest, NNIT, and NNE Pharmaplan.

Jørgensen was named as the Financial Times Person of the Year in December 2023.

On 16 May 2025, Novo announced that Lars Fruergaard Jørgensen will step down as CEO of Novo.

=== Senate hearing ===
On 24 September 2024, Jørgensen appeared before the Senate Committee on Health Education, Labor, and Pensions to defend Ozempic and Wegovy drug pricing. The committee, led by Bernie Sanders, reiterated the point that drug prices should be substantially lowered. Jørgensen reiterated that pharmacy benefit managers, PBMs, lower coverage when prices have a lower list price, thus making the access to the drugs harder for individuals. Sanders claimed three of the top PBMs promised to not reduce access if prices are lowered, however, Jørgensen had his doubts to these claims. Jørgensen reiterated that he will support any effort to help patients access the drug. Roger Marshall, a physician, sided with Novo and showed sympathy saying Novo "is not a villain in this story, they're a hero."

== Honours ==
- May 2019: Knight of the Order of the Dannebrog
- 2020: Lederne Leader of the Year
- December 2023: Financial Times Person of the Year
- 2024 Time Magazine 100 most influential people in health
