= Bernd Marin =

Austrian sociologist

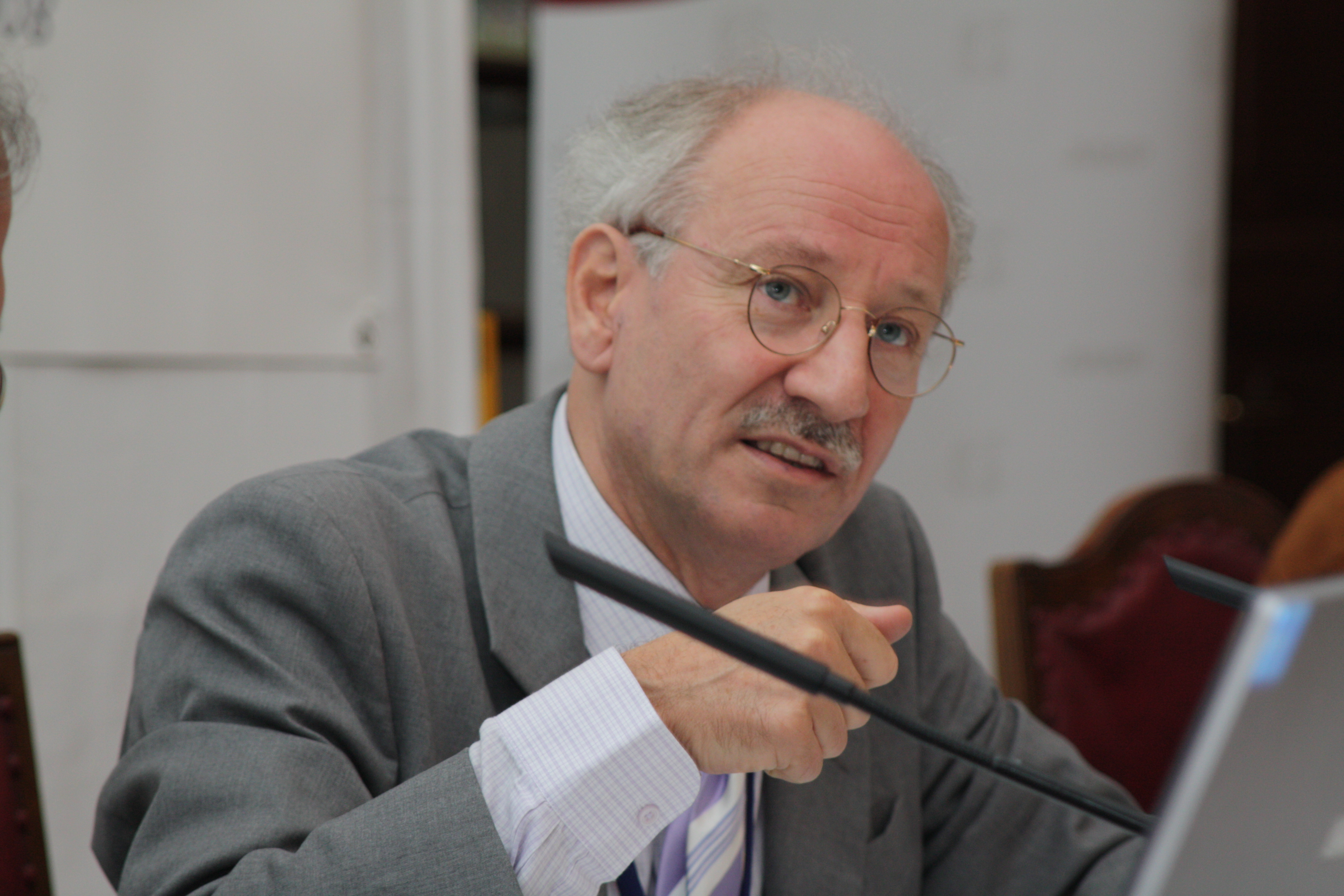
Bernd Marin (AARP/European Centre Conference, Dürnstein 2008)

Bernd Marin (born 1948 in Vienna) is an Austrian social scientist.

Marin served at the Institute for Conflict Research in Vienna from 1975 to 1984, first as a research fellow and later as a Deputy Director. From 1979 to 1996, he edited the Journal für Sozialforschung. Marin also contributes to civic debates in newspapers and magazines, radio and TV. He has published more than hundred papers in academic journals and collected volumes and has written, edited or co-edited more than twenty books.

From 1984 to 1988, Marin was the chair for comparative political and social research at the European University Institute in Florence and also served as visiting professor at numerous universities. From 1988 to 2015, he was the executive director of the think tank, European Centre for Social Welfare Policy and Research and the director of Webster Vienna Private University from October 2015 until June 2016.

== Life and career ==
Marin studied social sciences at the University of Vienna and concluded post-graduate training at the Institute of Advanced Studies in Vienna. From 1975 to 1984 he served at the Institute for Conflict Research in Vienna - first as a research fellow and later on as a deputy director. During this period he also completed his habilitation at the Johannes Kepler University Linz and carried out post-doctoral research at Harvard University.

From 1979 to 1996, he edited the Journal für Sozialforschung. Marin also contributes to civic debates in newspapers and magazines, radio and TV. He has published more than hundred papers in academic journals and collected volumes and has written, edited or co-edited more than twenty books.

From 1984 to 1988, Marin held the chair for Comparative Political and Social Research at the European University Institute in Florence. Marin also served as visiting professor at several other universities (Zurich, Warsaw, Florence, University of Innsbruck, Institute of Health Sciences at H. A. Barceló Foundation and Hebrew University of Jerusalem).

From 1988 to 2015, he was the Executive Director of the European Centre for Social Welfare Policy and Research, a think tank on economics and sociology (Vienna). Marin was director of Webster Vienna Private University from October 2015 until June 2016.

== Research ==
As a comparative social scientist, Marin is working on modern welfare societies, social security systems and their sustainability, on innovative employment initiatives, health, care and disability policies, as well as on pension reforms. He empirically analyses knowledge production and economic policy-making, focuses on changes and innovations in the labour markets and gender roles. Marin's role in the Austrian political campus is quite unique - as became clear for example during the controversial debates on pension reform, when all political parties relyed on his expertise.

In the field of social theory, Marin works on corporate, intermediary and societal governance, systems of self-regulation and co-operative change management, promoting the welfare-mix and societal activation as prerequisites of sustainable wealth, health, welfare and well-being.

== Selected publications ==
- Welfare in an Idle Society? Reinventing Retirement, Work, Wealth, Health, and Welfare. 2013
- Facts and Figures on Healthy Ageing and Long-Term Care. Europe and North America. With K. Gasior, M. Huber, G. Lamura, O. Lelkes, R. Rodrigues, A. Schmidt, E. Zólyomi, 2012
- Women's Work and Pensions: What is Good, What is Best? Designing Gender-Sensitive Arrangements. Ed. with E. Zólyomi, 2010
- Facts and Figures on Long-Term Care. Europe and North America. With M. Huber, R. Rodrigues, F. Hoffmann, K. Gasior, 2009
- Mainstreaming Ageing. Ed. with Asghar Zaidi, 2007
- Transforming Disability Welfare Policies. Towards Work and Equal Opportunities. Ed. with Ch. Prinz and M. Queisser, 2004
- Facts and Figures on Disability Welfare. with Ch. Prinz, 2003
- Innovative Employment Initiatives. Ed. with Dennis Snower and Danièle Meulders, 2000
- Pensionsreformen. Nachhaltiger Sozialumbau am Beispiel Österreichs. with Ch. Prinz, Okt. 1999, 2. Aufl.
- Managing AIDS: Organizational Responses in Six European Countries. Ed. with Patrick Kenis, 1997
- Policy Networks. Empirical Evidence and Theoretical Considerations. Ed. with R. Mayntz, 1991
- Generalized Political Exchange. Antagonistic Cooperation and Integrated Policy Circuits Ed., 1990
- Governance and Generalized Exchange. Self-Organizing Policy Networks in Action Ed., 1990
- Unternehmerorganisationen im Verbändestaat Vol. I, 1986
- Die Paritätische Kommission. Aufgeklärter Technokorporatismus in Österreich 1982
