= Viborg Katedralskole =

Coordinates: 56°27′26.38″N 9°24′43.59″E

Location
- Gl. Skivevej 2 Viborg; Denmark

Information
- Motto: Vitam Impendere Vero
- Established: ca. 1060
- Rector: Helge Markussen
- Enrollment: About 1150
- Website: www.viborgkatedralskole.dk
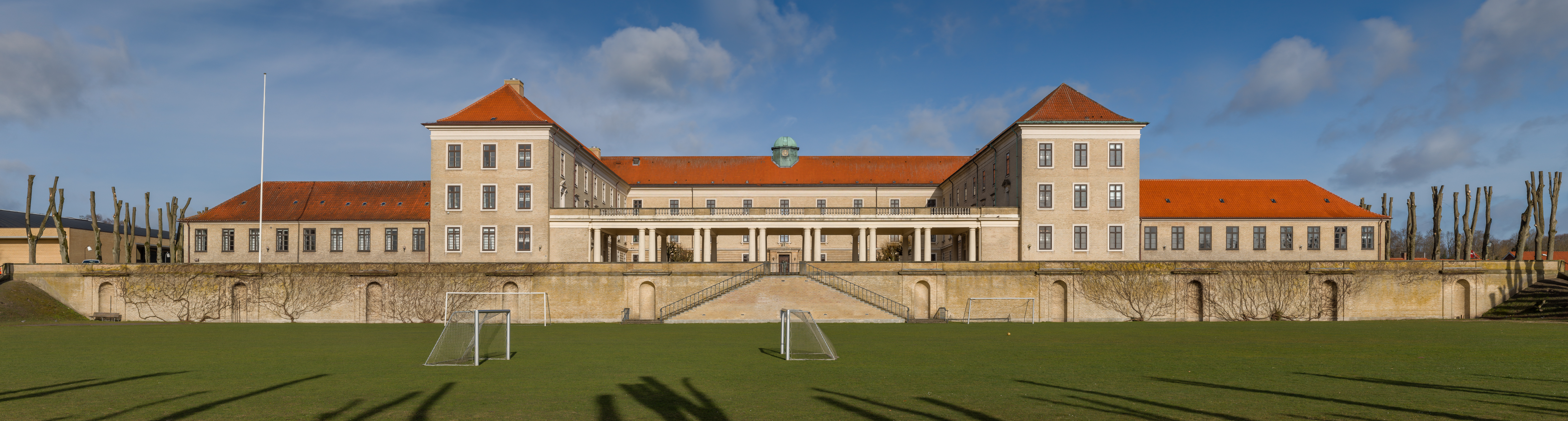

Viborg Katedralskole is a public gymnasium (secondary education school) and IB World School in Viborg, Denmark. The school is located at Gammel Skivevej 2 in Viborg and supports about 1000 students.

== History ==
The Katedralskole was established around 1060 as a Catholic seminary. Young men were schooled in Bible reading, hymn singing, and prayers, in Latin. Until the 16th century, the school's rector was appointed by the bishop of the Roman Catholic Diocese of Viborg and also served as a priest in one of Viborg's twelve churches.

After the Protestant Reformation in 1536, regulation of the school was taken over by the Danish kings. In 1772, the school moved from its original site near Viborg Cathedral to St. Mogens Gade 1, while the earlier structure was rebuilt to hold a larger number of students and schoolmasters. A garden known as the Latin Garden was later landscaped around the school, as a result of a fire in the surrounding area.

The 19th century saw a series of school reforms: a library was established, and subjects were taught in Danish. In 1903, a national law was introduced in Denmark which allowed girls to be admitted to the gymnasiums, and in 1904 the Katedralskole became coeducational.

In 1922, work was begun to build a new main school building on the corner of Skivevej and Aalborgvej designed by the architect Hack Kampmann, in the Neoclassical style as seen from the exterior, with a modern Scandinavian interior. Kampmann had died before construction began, and his son, the architect Christian Kampmann, completed the project in 1926. This building is now protected.

At the beginning of 2007, a large new room was added within the roof, providing more space for group work. The room has been given the name "Kampmann Hall" after the school's architect.

=== Notable former pupils ===
- Johannes V. Jensen Author, Nobel laureate
- Johan Otto von Spreckelsen, Architect and professor
- Peer Hultberg
- Anders Fogh Rasmussen (1972) Prime Minister of Denmark (2001–2009) and former Secretary General of NATO
- Anders Samuelsen (1986) Foreign Minister of Denmark (2016–2019)
- Jens Rohde
- Janus Metz
- Lise Rønne (1997) Host of the Eurovision Song Contest 2014
- Bent Hansen
- Christina Roslyng (1999) Olympic gold winner (women's handball)
- Rikke Skov (2000) Olympic gold winner (women's handball)
- Josephine Touray Olympic gold winner (women's handball)
- Rene Toft Hansen Olympic gold winner (Men's handball (Rio 2016))
- Lars Fruergaard Jørgensen, CEO of Novo Nordisk
