= Oluf Borbye Pedersen =

Danish physician and professor (born 1945)

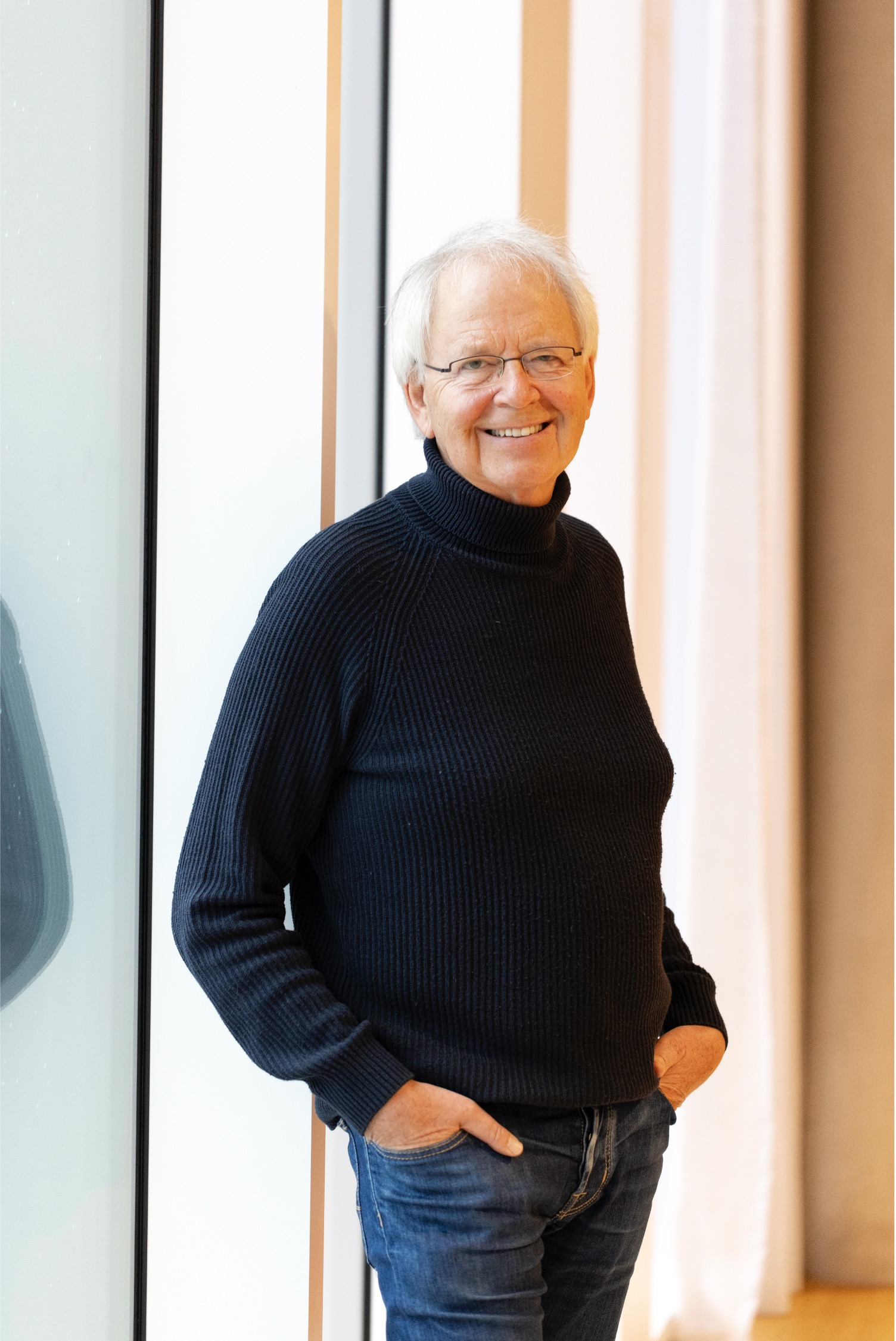
- Born: 1945 (age 80–81); Randers, Denmark
- Education: Aarhus University (MD, DMSc)
- Known for: Steno-2 multifactorial intervention trial in type 2 diabetes; Human gut microbiome research including discovery of bacterial polypeptide hormones RORDEP1 and 2
- Awards: Claude Bernard Gold Medal; Knight 1st Class of the Order of the Dannebrog
- Scientific career
- Fields: Endocrinology; metabolic medicine; human genomics; microbiome science
- Workplaces: University of Copenhagen; Herlev–Gentofte University Hospital; Steno Diabetes Center

Oluf Borbye Pedersen (born 1945) is a Danish physician and distinguished professor of human molecular metabolism whose research spans diabetes care, endocrinology, human genomics and the gut microbiome. He is known for leading the Steno-2 trial, which demonstrated durable benefits of intensive, multifactorial risk-factor management in type 2 diabetes; and led DNA-based studies of the human gut microbiome and its links to cardio-metabolic health, including the identification of human gut microbiome polypeptide hormones (RORDEP1/2) with endocrine-like effects.

He was appointed Knight 1st Class of the Order of the Dannebrog in 2019.

== Early life and education ==
Pedersen was born in Randers, Denmark in 1945. He earned his MD from Aarhus University in 1972, where he received a Gold Medal for a thesis in nutritional physiology, and completed a Doctor of Medical Science (DMSc) in molecular and cellular biology in 1983. He obtained board certification (Danish Health Board authorization) as a specialist in internal medicine and endocrinology in 1989.

== Career ==
Following basic clinical training in medicine, neurology and cardiology (1972–1987) at Aarhus University Hospitals, Pedersen was Visiting Professor in molecular biology at the Joslin Diabetes Center, Boston (1986–1988). He served as Chief Physician and Research Director at the Steno Diabetes Center and Hagedorn Research Institute (1989–2010). He held personal chairs in molecular diabetology at the University of Copenhagen (1995–2000) and Aarhus University (2001–2011), and visiting professor positions at Harvard Medical School (2001–2002) and at Peking Union Medical College/Beijing Genomics Institute (2008–2010).

Pedersen founded the Lundbeck Foundation Centre of Excellence in Medical Genomics (LuCamp) (2007–2015) and co-founded the Novo Nordisk Foundation Center for Basic Metabolic Research (CBMR) at the University of Copenhagen in 2010, where he later directed the Section for Metabolic Genetics (2010–2016) and led a research group (2017–2021). Since 2021 he has been Chief Research Physician and Principal Investigator at Herlev–Gentofte University Hospital and an affiliated senior investigator at CBMR; in 2022 he became Professor of Human Molecular Metabolism at the University of Copenhagen. In 2023 he founded GutCRINE Pharmabiotics where he serves as Chief scientific officer.

== Research ==
=== Diabetes care and the Steno-2 trial ===
Pedersen initiated and led the Steno-2 Study, a randomized trial of patients with type 2 diabetes and microalbuminuria that compared intensified, goal-oriented multifactorial intervention (lifestyle plus polypharmacotherapy) versus conventional care. The trial and long-term follow-up showed significant reductions in cardiovascular events and mortality, with benefits persisting years after the active intervention ended.

Key publications reported reductions in cardiovascular disease with intensive therapy (2003) and nearly halved all-cause mortality (2008). At 21 years of follow-up of 7.8 years of intensified, multifactorial, target-driven treatment of type 2 diabetes with microalbuminuria, median of 7.9 years of gain of life was shown (2016). Summaries and later overviews have highlighted Steno-2 as a landmark for comprehensive risk-factor management in high-risk type 2 diabetes.

=== Genomics of diabetes and obesity ===
From the late 1990s, Pedersen and his LuCamp team contributed to genome-wide association studies and mechanistic follow-ups in diabetes, obesity and cardiovascular disease, including EU-co-funded research consortia.

=== Gut microbiome and metabolism ===
As one of the initiators and leaders of the European-Chinese MetaHIT consortium Pedersen contributed to the widely used gene catalogue of the human gut microbiome (2010). He subsequently led research linking microbial gene richness to metabolic markers in obesity and insulin resistance and investigated microbiome features associated with lifestyle, drugs and cardio-metabolic risk.

In 2025, he and his team reported human gut microbiome RORDEP1 and RORDEP2 polypeptides, synthesized by common gut bacteria and circulating in human blood. In preclinical studies, the investigators demonstrated that RORDEPs impact energy and bone metabolism, suggesting an endocrine dimension to host–microbe interactions.

== Academic and professional service ==
Pedersen has served as President of the Danish Diabetes Association (1995–2000), co-founded the Danish Diabetes Academy and the Danish Society of Molecular Medicine, and has been on boards and grant bodies in Denmark and internationally.

== Publications and bibliometrics ==
As of summer 2025, Web of Science listed over 1,100 peer-reviewed publications for Pedersen (including articles in Nature, NEJM, Cell, Science, Lancet and others), with more than 109,000 citations and an h-index of 139.

== Honors and recognition ==
Pedersen is an Honorary Member of the European Association for the Study of Diabetes (EASD). He has received multiple international and Danish distinctions for contributions to diabetes and metabolic research (selection includes: the Claude Bernard Gold Medal and The Hagedorn Prize). He was appointed Knight 1st Class of the Order of the Dannebrog in 2019.

== Selected publications ==
- Pedersen, O.; Gæde, P.; Vedel, P.; Larsen, N.; Jensen, G.V.H.; Parving, H.H. (2003). "Multifactorial intervention and cardiovascular disease in patients with type 2 diabetes". New England Journal of Medicine. 348 (5): 383–393.
- Pedersen, O.; Gæde, P.; Lund-Andersen, H.; Parving, H.H. (2008). "Effect of a multifactorial intervention on mortality in type 2 diabetes". New England Journal of Medicine. 358 (6): 580–591.
- Pedersen, O.; Gæde, P.; et al. (2016). "Years of life gained by multifactorial intervention in patients with type 2 diabetes mellitus and microalbuminuria: 21 years follow-up on the Steno-2 randomised trial". Diabetologia. 59 (11): 2298–2307.
- Pedersen, O.; Le Chatelier, E.; Nielsen, T.; Qin, J.; Prifti, E.; Hildebrand, F.; Falony, G.; MetaHIT Consortium (2013). "Richness of human gut microbiome correlates with metabolic markers". Nature. 500 (7464): 541–546.
- Pedersen, O.; Forslund, K.; Hildebrand, F.; Nielsen, T.; Falony, G.; Le Chatelier, E.; MetaHIT Consortium (2015). "Disentangling type 2 diabetes and metformin treatment signatures in the human gut microbiota". Nature. 528 (7581): 262–266.
- Pedersen, O.; Wang, J.; et al. (2022). "Microbiome and metabolome features of the cardiometabolic disease spectrum". Nature Medicine. 28 (2): 303–314.
- Pedersen, O.; Fan, Y.; Støving, R.K.; Ibraim, S.B.; Hyötyläinen, T.; Thirion, F.; Arora, T.; et al. (2023). "The gut microbiota contributes to the pathogenesis of anorexia nervosa in humans and mice". Nature Microbiology. 8: 787–802.
- Pedersen, O.; Wu, Y.; et al. (2023). "Polypeptides synthesized by common bacteria in the human gut improve rodent metabolism". Nature Metabolism. 5: 1727–1742.
