= Acquired haemophilia =

Human disease

Acquired haemophilia A (AHA) is a rare but potentially life-threatening bleeding disorder characterized by autoantibodies directed against coagulation factor VIII. These autoantibodies constitute the most common spontaneous inhibitor to any coagulation factor and may induce spontaneous bleeding in patients with no previous history of a bleeding disorder.

Its incidence is approximately 1.5 cases/million/year. The distribution is bimodal with a first period occurrence between 20 and 30 years old, which mainly corresponds to women who develop this disorder in the postpartum, and a second peak between 68 and 80 years old, corresponding to the majority of patients, with no sex difference.

An underlying medical condition can be identified in up to 50% of patients, including cancer either solid or hematologic; autoimmune diseases such as rheumatoid arthritis, Sjögren syndrome, or bullous pemphigoid; administration of drugs and pregnancy. However, AHA can also emerge in elderly people without any risk factors.

Overall mortality rate in AHA is varies from 20% to 70% depending on the series, attributed to the underlying disorder in about 50% of the cases, infections (5-15%) and major bleeding episodes (4%)

The reason for this loss of tolerance to self-factors is still unclear. There may be different involved mechanisms, such as the presence of certain gene polymorphisms (e.g., HLA, CTLA4) and/or autoreactive CD4+ T lymphocytes.

== Clinical features ==
Due to the variable bleeding phenotype of this disorder, the clinical picture ranges from life-threatening and traumatic bleeds to mild or no bleeding tendency. In some cases, it is first noted after a surgical procedure, however, most occur spontaneously without apparent provocation. As patients with AHA are often elderly, co-morbidities and co-medications such as anti-platelet agents may also influence the clinical profile and require an individualized therapeutic approach.

Symptomatic patients often present with large hematomas, extensive ecchymosis or severe mucosal bleeding, including epistaxis, gastrointestinal bleeding, and haematuria. In contrast with what happens to patients with congenital haemophilia, spontaneous hemarthroses are unusual. Women with postpartum factor VIII inhibitors usually present with abnormal vaginal bleeding.

== Diagnosis ==
Any acute or recent onset of bleeding symptoms in a patient with no previous history of bleeding, especially in elderly or post-partum patients, and an unexplained isolated prolonged activated partial thromboplastin time (aPTT) suggest the diagnosis of AHA, and need further investigation. The differential diagnosis in prolonged aPPT with a normal prothrombin time (PT) includes factor deficiencies, lupus anticoagulant or heparin therapy.

The first step to distinguish between factor deficiency and the presence of an inhibitory substance is to perform a mixing test, in which patient plasma and normal plasma are mixed and aPTT measured; correction of prolonged aPTT suggests a factor deficiency while persistent prolongation indicates the presence of an inhibitor. Prolongation of the aPTT in a mixture of patient and normal plasma after a 1-2 h incubation compared to an immediate mix is typical of FVIII autoantibodies, as FVIII inhibitors are time and temperature-dependent.

The diagnosis is confirmed by the subsequent identification of reduced FVIII levels with evidence of FVIII neutralising activity (titrated using the Bethesda assay or the Nijmegen modification).

== Treatment ==
Patients with acquired coagulation factor inhibitors should be treated jointly with haemophilia centres experienced in the management of inhibitors. Initial treatment consists of four steps:

1. Prevention of bleeding events, avoiding or minimizing actions that might provoke bleeding such as intramuscular injections, invasive procedures and use of antiplatelet and nonsteroidal anti-inflammatory agents.
2. Treatment of the underlying disorder.
3. Therapy of bleeding
4. Antibody eradication

== Therapy of bleeding ==
Anti-haemorrhagic treatment should be initiated in patients with AHA and active severe bleeding symptoms irrespective of inhibitor titre and residual FVIII activity. First-line treatment includes by-pass agents (activated prothrombin complex concentrates [aPCC] Factor Eight Inhibitor Bypassing Activity [FEIBA] and recombinant activated factor VII rFVIIa). Both treatments are effective and there is no evidence for the use of one product in preference to the other. Therapy should be continued until bleeding is controlled and management must generally rely on the clinical assessment as there are no validated laboratory tests to determine therapeutic levels. The main concern about the use of these agents is the appearance of thrombotic events. Tranexamic acid is a useful adjunct therapy but concerns about its concomitant use with FEIBA exist.

A recombinant porcine FVIII molecule has recently been approved to treat bleeding episodes, with similar pharmacokinetics to human FVIII and the possibility of laboratory measurement and dose-adjustment. Emicizumab, may allow easier outpatient bleeding prophylaxis and reduce intensity of immunosuppression.

Alternative treatments if first-line treatment is unavailable or fails include human FVIII, DDAVP, intravenous immunoglobulin, immunoadsorption and plasmapheresis.

== Antibody eradication ==
All patients diagnosed with AHA should receive immunosuppressive therapy immediately following diagnosis with prednisolone either alone or combined with cyclophosphamide, what has a complete remission rate of 70-80%.

If there is no response within 3–5 weeks, second-line therapies should be considered. The most common second-line treatment is with rituximab combined with other agents. Alternative options are calcineurin inhibitors, multiple immunosuppressive agents and immune tolerance protocols.

Most immunosuppressive drugs are associated with side effects, including neutropenia-related infections and sepsis.

The relapse rate after a first complete remission has been estimated at 20%.

== See also ==
- Coagulopathy
- Haemophilia A
