= Factor VII deficiency =

- Other names: Hypoproconvertinemia
- This condition is inherited in an autosomal recessive manner.
- Specialty: Hematology, medical genetics

Factor VII deficiency is a bleeding disorder characterized by a lack in the production of factor VII (FVII), a protein that causes blood to clot in the coagulation cascade. After a trauma factor VII initiates the process of coagulation in conjunction with tissue factor (TF/factor III) in the extrinsic pathway.

The condition may be inherited or acquired. It is the most common of the rare congenital coagulation disorders.

== Signs and symptoms ==
Symptoms may differ greatly, as apparently modifiers control to some degree the amount of FVII that is produced. Some affected individuals have few or no symptoms while others may experience life-threatening bleeding. Typically this bleeding disorder manifests itself as a tendency to easy bruising, nose bleeding, heavy and prolonged menstruation, and excessive bleeding after dental or surgical interventions. Newborns may bleed in the head, from the umbilicus, or excessively after circumcision. Other bleeding can be encountered in the gut, in muscles or joints, or the brain. Hematuria may occur.

While in congenital disease symptoms may be present at birth or show up later, in patients with acquired FVII deficiency symptoms typically show up in later life.

About 3-4% of patients with FVII deficiency may also experience thrombotic episodes.

== Causes ==
Inherited or congenital FVII deficiency is passed on by autosomal recessive inheritance. A person needs to inherit a defective gene from both parents. People who have only one defective gene do not exhibit the disease, but can pass the gene on to half their offspring. Different genetic mutations have been described.

In persons with the congenital FVII deficiency the condition is lifelong. People with this condition should alert other family members may they also have the condition or carry the gene. In the general population the condition affects about 1 in 300,000 to 500,000 people. However, the prevalence may be higher as not all individuals may express the disease and be diagnosed.

In the acquired form of FVII deficiency an insufficient amount of factor VII is produced by the liver due to liver disease, vitamin K deficiency, or certain medications (i.e., Coumadin).

== Diagnosis ==
Blood tests are needed to differentiate FVII deficiency from other bleeding disorders. Typical is a discordance between the prolonged prothrombin time (PT) and normal levels for the activated partial thromboplastin time (APTT). FVII levels are <10IU/dl in homozygous individuals, and between 20-60 in heterozygous carriers. The FCVII: C assay supports the diagnosis.

The FVII gene (F7) is found on chromosome 13q34. Heterogeneous mutations have been described in FVII deficient patients.

== Treatment ==
There are several treatments available for factor VII deficiency; they all replace deficient FVII.

1. Recombinant FVIIa concentrate (rFVIIa) is a recombinant treatment that is highly effective and has no risk of fluid overload or viral disease. It may be the optimal therapy.
2. Plasma derived Factor VII concentrate (pdFVII) : This treatment is suitable for surgery but can lead to thrombosis. It is virus attenuated.
3. Prothrombin complex concentrate (PCC) containing factor VII: this treatment is suitable for surgery, but has a risk of thrombosis. It is virus attenuated.
4. Fresh frozen plasma (FFP): This is relatively inexpensive and readily available. While effective this treatment carries a risk of blood-borne viruses and fluid overload.

== History ==
The condition was first described by Dr. B. Alexander, R. Goldstein, G. Landwehr G, and CD. Cook in 1951.
