= NNIT =

Danish IT company

NNIT A/S
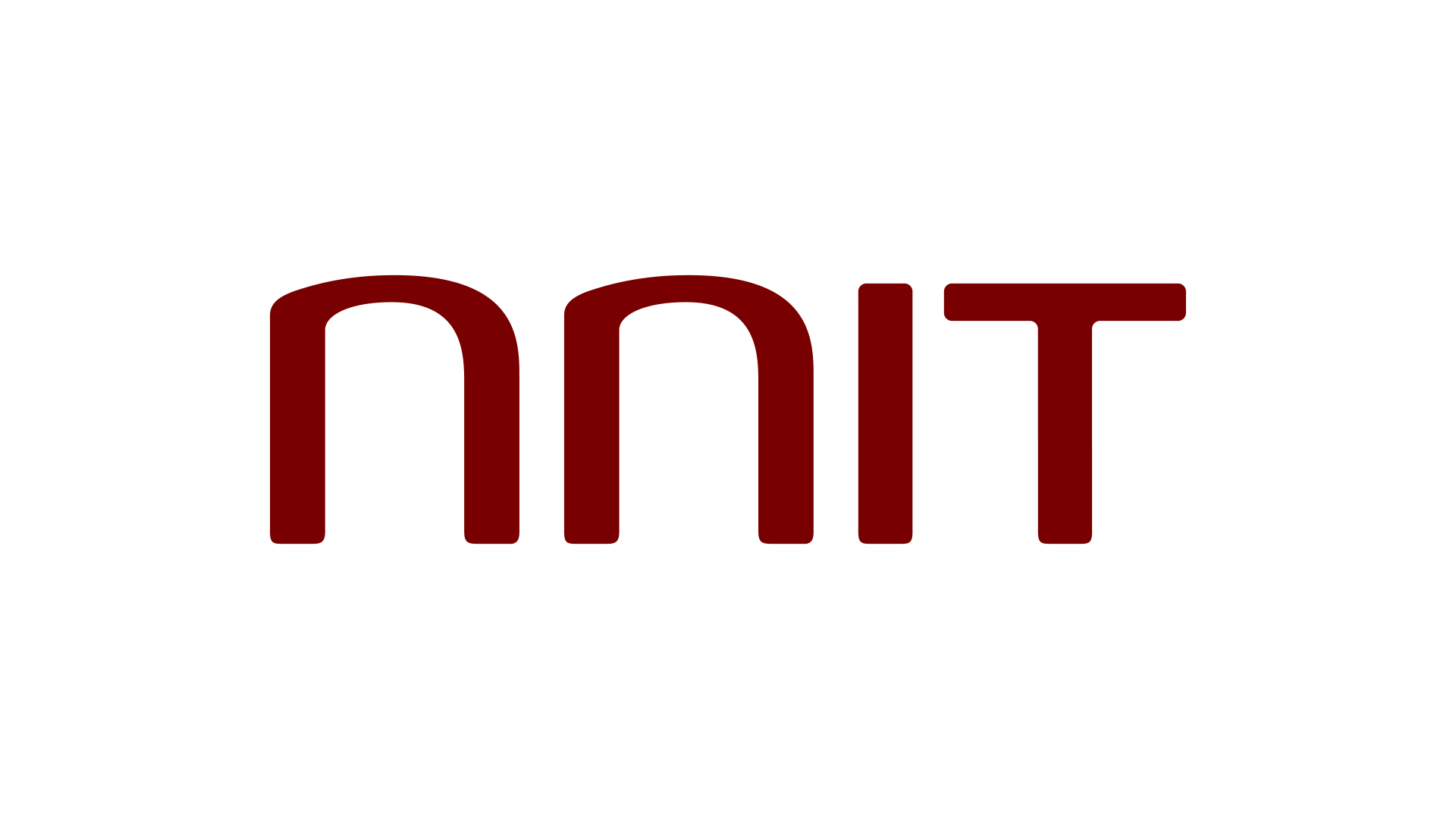
- Formerly: Novo Nordisk IT
- Type: Publicly traded Aktieselskab
- Traded as: Nasdaq Copenhagen: NNIT
- Industry: IT
- Founded: 1 May 1998; 28 years ago
- Headquarters: Copenhagen, Denmark
- Area served: Europe, USA and Asia
- Key people: Claus Rydkjær (CEO); Carsten Ringius (CFO)
- Revenue: DKK 1,788,000,000 (2025)
- Operating income: DKK 94,000,000 (2025)
- Total assets: DKK 1,517,000,000 (2025)
- Number of employees: 1,652 (2025)
- Parent: Novo Holdings
- Subsidiaries: SCALES
- Website: www.nnit.com

NNIT A/S is a Danish IT company that provides IT consultancy, development, implementation and outsourcing of IT services to clients within life sciences in Denmark and internationally as well as to all types of customers in Denmark.

NNIT has approximately 1,650 employees. The company is headquartered in Denmark and has offices across Europe, USA and Asia.

The unit was founded as Novo Nordisk IT in 1994 through the merger of Novo's two existing information technology units. In 1998, Novo Nordisk IT was established as a private limited company, wholly owned by Novo. In 2004, the company changed its name to the current NNIT. In March 2015, NNIT was listed on the NASDAQ OMX.

Many of NNIT's customers operate in the life sciences sector, including NNIT's major customer, the Novo Group, a life sciences group, which comprises Novo and subsidiaries, but NNIT also provides services to customers in the public, enterprise and finance sectors, among these the Danish Defence, the National Police of Denmark, the Danish Agency for Digital Government, Arla Foods, PFA and Danish Bank.
