= Hans Christian Hagedorn =

Danish physician (1888–1971)

Hans Christian Hagedorn (1888-1971)

Hans Christian Hagedorn (6 March 1888 – 6 October 1971) was the creator of NPH insulin and the founder of Nordisk Insulinlaboratorium, which is known today as Novo Nordisk.

== Early life and education ==
Hagedorn was born in Copenhagen. His father was the captain of a coaster adapted for use as a folk high school ship where aspiring sailors received training in navigation as well as other subjects. Hagedorn attended Hesselager Latin School on Funen. In 1916, he began to study medicine at the University of Copenhagen. During his studies, he worked as an assistant for Carl Julius Salomonsen. He also assisted Christian Bohr.

== Career ==
Hagedorn joined forces with Nobel laureate August Krogh (1874–1949) to obtain rights for insulin production in the Nordic countries from Frederick Banting and Charles Best of Toronto. In 1923 they formed Nordisk Insulinlaboratorium, and in 1926 with August Krogh he obtained a Danish royal charter as a non-profit foundation.

In the 1930s he became interested in modifying the absorption rate of insulin. He was aware that contaminating proteins slowed the absorption of insulin into the bloodstream, but these caused irritation and side effects. Thus he searched for a protein that would not cause any irritation. He came upon protamine, a protein isolated from fish sperm. Hagedorn discovered that the addition of protamine to insulin caused the insulin to form microscopic needles. These needles took longer to dissolve into the bloodstream. Protamine zinc insulin (PZI) was first created in 1936 and neutral protamine Hagedorn (NPH) insulin in 1946. NPH insulin is the complex of protamine and insulin at neutral pH (7.0). It is one of the earliest examples of engineering drug delivery.

== Legacy ==
=== The Hagedorn Prize ===
The Hagedorn Prize, named after Hans Christian Hagedorn, celebrates achievements in the understanding and treatment of diabetes. Hagedorn's work significantly advanced the quality of insulin production and diabetes care, making this award a tribute to his legacy in the field. The Hagedorn Prize is recognised as the most prestigious award in Internal Medicine in Denmark.. Hagedorn died in 1971 at age 83.
