= Novo (company) =

Danish pharmaceutical company

Novo Nordisk A/S

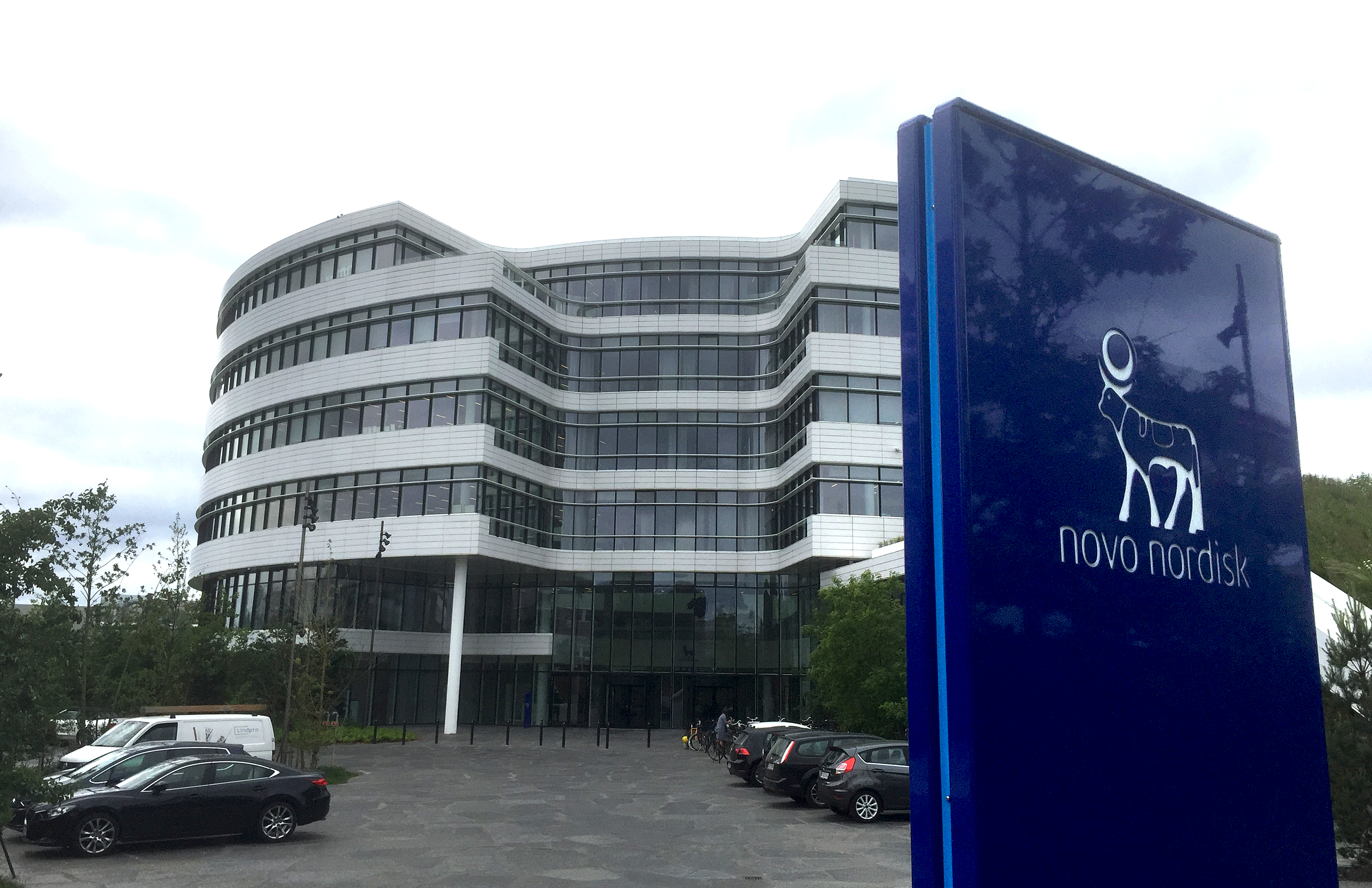
- Headquarters in Bagsværd, Greater Copenhagen, Denmark
- Trade name: Novo
- Type: Public
- Traded as: Nasdaq Copenhagen: NOVO B; OMX Copenhagen 25 component
- ISIN: DK0062498333
- Industry: Pharmaceuticals; Health care
- Founded: 21 December 1923; 102 years ago
- Headquarters: Bagsværd, Greater Copenhagen, Denmark
- Number of locations: Offices, production, and research facilities in 80 countries
- Area served: 170 countries
- Key people: Lars Rebien Sørensen (chairman); Mike Doustdar (president and CEO)
- Products: Activelle; Actraphane; Actrapid; Awiqli; Fiasp; Insulatard; Kyinsu; Levemir; Mixtard; Norditropin; NovoEight; NovoMix; NovoNorm; NovoRapid; NovoSeven; NovoThirteen; Ozempic; Rybelsus; Ryzodeg; Saxenda; Tresiba; Victoza; Wegovy; Xultophy
- Revenue: 309.1 billion kr. (2025)
- Operating income: 127.7 billion kr. (2025)
- Net income: 102.4 billion kr. (2025)
- Total assets: 542.9 billion kr. (2025)
- Total equity: 194.0 billion kr. (2025)
- Owner: Novo Holdings (28%)
- Number of employees: 69,505 (2025)
- Website: novonordisk.com novonordisk-us.com

Novo Nordisk A/S, doing business as Novo, is a Danish multinational pharmaceutical company. Novo manufactures and markets pharmaceutical products and services, primarily obesity and diabetes medications and devices. The corporation was created in 1989, through a merger of two Danish pharmaceutical companies, which date back to the 1920s.

Novo employs approximately 69,500 people in 80 countries, and markets its products in approximately 170 countries. Novo is controlled by majority shareholder Novo Holdings (wholly owned by the Novo Nordisk Foundation) which holds 28% of its shares and a majority (77%) of its voting shares.

Novo is a full member of the European Federation of Pharmaceutical Industries and Associations (EFPIA).

The company was ranked 25th among Fortune's 100 Best Companies to Work For in 2010, and subsequently ranked 72nd in 2014 and 73rd in 2017. In January 2012, Novo was named the most sustainable company in the world by the business magazine Corporate Knights. It is a leader in the FTSE4Good Index, and the only European company in the top ten.

Novo is the largest pharmaceutical company in Denmark. In 2023, Novo's market capitalization exceeded the GDP of Denmark, and it became the highest valued company in Europe.

== History ==
Novo traces its origins to the 1920s with the founding of Nordisk Insulin Laboratorium and Novo Terapeutisk Laboratorium.

=== 1922–1925 ===
Danish Nobel laureate August Krogh

August Krogh and his wife Marie became interested in insulin upon hearing about it while on an American lecture tour in 1923; they modified their itinerary to meet with insulin discoverers Frederick Banting, John Macleod, Charles Best, and James Collip. August Krogh received permission to produce insulin in Denmark; Krogh and Hans Christian Hagedorn, with funding and facilities support from August Kongsted, began experimenting with means of extracting and purifying insulin from fish and rabbit pancreases.

Known as the Insulin Laboratory, the research and production arm was operated as a unit of Kongsted's pharmaceutical company, Løvens Kemiske Fabrik. Kongsted rented a factory in Emdrup, Denmark, in late 1923 to help meet the demand for insulin. The Insulin Laboratory and the factory were spun off into a new company, Nordisk Insulin Laboratorium, in July 1924. The company was founded with an associated foundation and the three men served as the board of directors for both, with the foundation board membership barring them from profiting on the sale of insulin. The foundation and Nordisk Insulin signed articles of association in 1926 and the foundation received tax-exempt status by royal decree in January 1927.

In 1925, brothers Harald and Thorvald Pedersen, who were former employees of Nordisk, formed their own company, Novo Terapeutisk Laboratorium. Novo and Nordisk competed until they merged in 1989, to become Novo Nordisk.

=== 1982–1994 ===
Novo Industri (Novo Terapeutisk Laboratorium) established its presence in the US in 1982, via a joint venture with Squibb Corporation and Canada in 1984. In 1985, the company introduced the first insulin pen device called Novopen.

Novo Industri (Novo Terapeutisk Laboratorium) and Nordisk Gentofte (Nordisk Insulinlaboratorium) merged in early 1989 to form Novo Nordisk, and their controlling foundations merged to form the Novo Nordisk Foundation. At the time of the merger, the new company employed 7,350 people. In 1991, Novo Nordisk Engineering (now NNE) demerged after working as in-house consultants at Novo for years to standard engineering services to pharmaveutical manufacturing companies, and three years later, in 1994, Novo's existing information technology units was spun out as the life sciences-focused IT company NNIT.

Audits of processes in 1993 found that Novo Nordisk did not have sufficient separation between its manufacturing sites for insulin and penicillin, leading to risks of cross contamination, and that it generally had not been meeting good manufacturing practices (GMP) as required by the United States Food and Drug Administration (FDA). It had also updated manufacturing processes without getting additional approval from the FDA, all of which jeopardized the firm's ability to sell products in the US. The penicillin problem was too great to overcome profitably, thus Novo Nordisk ended all production of penicillin in Denmark in 1993. The GMP violations and unapproved process updates led to further challenges from the FDA and a bar on insulin imports to the US; the issues identified by the FDA were sufficiently corrected in late 1994 and exports resumed.

By 1995, Novo Nordisk had 13,000 employees, annual revenues of US$2.5 billion, and an annual profit of US$285 million. Approximately 73 percent of its revenue came from insulin and other pharmaceuticals. In 2000, Novo Nordisk's enzyme business split off to become a separate company, Novozymes.

=== 2000–2018 ===
Novo USA headquarters offices in Plainsboro Township, New Jersey

Novo's enzymes business, Novozymes (later known as Novonesis), was spun-out in 2000. Novo acquired Xellia for $700 million in 2013. The same year, Novo of USA moved into new headquarters offices in Plainsboro Township, New Jersey, by way of extensively renovating abandoned premises. This action served to consolidate several facilities that the company had previously had in Plainsboro.

In 2015, the company announced it would collaborate with Ablynx, using its nanobody technology to develop at least one new drug candidate. In January 2018, Reuters reported that Novo had offered to acquire Ablynx for $3.1 billion – having made an unreported offer in mid-December for the company. However, the Ablynx board rejected this offer the same day, explaining that the price undervalued the business. Ultimately Novo lost out to Sanofi who bid $4.8 billion. Later, in the same year, the company announced it would acquire Ziylo for around $800 million.

=== 2020–present ===
In March 2020, Novo volunteers started testing samples for SARS-CoV-2 with RT-qPCR equipment in the ongoing coronavirus pandemic to increase available test capacity. In June, the business announced it would acquire AstraZeneca's cardiovascular disease-focused spin-off Corvidia Therapeutics for an initial sum of $725 million (up to a performance-related maximum of $2.1 billion). In November, the company announced it would acquire Emisphere Technologies for $1.8 billion, gaining control of a pill-based treatment for diabetes. Novo then announced in December that it would acquire Emisphere Technologies for $1.35 billion.

In November 2021, Novo announced it would acquire Dicerna Pharmaceuticals and its RNAi therapeutics, for $3.3 billion ($38.25 per share).

In September 2022, Novo agreed to acquire Forma Therapeutics for $1.1 billion with the intent to expand its sickle cell disease and rare blood disorders portfolio.

By 2022 the popularity of Novo's Wegovy and Ozempic for weight loss was so great as to significantly increase the growth of the entire economy of Denmark. Two-thirds of Denmark's overall economic growth in 2022 was attributed to the pharmaceutical industry. The company's profits increased by 45% year over year in the first half of 2023. Most of the growth occurred from its weight loss drugs, Wegovy and Ozempic, which accounted for 55% of the company's 2023 revenue.

In August 2023, Novo agreed to acquire the Montreal-headquartered pharmaceutical company, Inversago Pharma for $1 billion and Embark Biotech for up to $500 million. In October 2023, the company announced it would acquire ocedurenone – an experimental drug for uncontrolled hypertension and potentially beneficial in treating cardiovascular and kidney diseases – from KBP Biosciences for $1.3 billion. After a failed clinical trial the following year, Novo initiated legal action against KBP alleging that the company misrepresented the drug's effectiveness by concealing unfavorable clinical trial data. Seeking up to $830 million in damages, the Singapore International Commercial Court granted Novo's request for a freeze on KBP's assets and those of its founder, Huang Zhenhua.

In November 2023, Novo announced investment of €2.1 billion in a French production facility to increase the production capacity and manufacturing of its popular anti-obesity medication.

In February 2024, parent company Novo Holdings agreed to acquire Catalent for $16.5 billion. On completion, Novo said it would acquire three manufacturing facilities from its parent for $11 billion to scale up production to meet the massive demand for Wegovy and Ozempic.

In March 2024, Novo reached a $604 billion market capitalization and became the 12th most valuable company in the world. The company's stock jumped to a record high after early trial data showed positive results for its new experimental weight loss pill amycretin. The company also announced it would acquire Cardior Pharmaceuticals and its cardiovascular disease portfolio for up to $1.1 billion.

As of April 2024, the flow of cash from Novo's weight-loss drugs was continuing to solidify its status as the most valuable company in Europe, to the point that economists were worried that Denmark might come down with Dutch disease (that is, a country that does only one thing well and nothing else). The company's market capitalization of $570 billion remained larger than the entire economy of Denmark, its $2.3 billion income tax bill for 2023 made it the largest taxpayer in the country, and its rapid growth was driving nearly all of the expansion of Denmark's economy. The company had started to move away from its traditional focus on diabetes care towards a more ambitious mission to "defeat serious chronic diseases", and towards that end, hired over 10,000 people in 2023 alone. To effectively manage the rapid expansion of its workforce while maintaining its traditional corporate culture, the Novo Nordisk Way, the company put over 400 senior executives through a leadership development program called NNX, which stands for Novo Nordisk Next.

In May 2024, the company announced it would acquire Austrian fluid management service business, Single Use Support.

In June 2024, the company announced plans to build a new production plant in Clayton, North Carolina, at a cost of $4.1 billion. It will be the company's fourth in the state of North Carolina and used for production of semaglutide products Ozempic and Wegovy. The company also announced plans to acquire three US-based Catalent sites in to increase production supply.

As of October 2024, Novo was the second most valuable drug company in the world by market capitalization, second only to its competitor Eli Lilly and Company. By July 2025, Novo had fallen to become the fifth most valuable drug company amid rising competition from generic weight loss substitutes. The company named Mike Doustdar as the new CEO, effective 7 August 2025.

In March 2025, the company announced new plans for a direct-to-consumer offering of its Wegovy weight loss drug. The company established a new pharmacy, called NovoCare, which would charge customers $499 per month for access to the drug, less than half the cost of the drug through other pharmaceutical distribution networks.

In September 2025, Novo announced that it would reduce its global workforce by 9,000 people, approximately 9% of its total workforce.

In October 2025, Novo acquired Akero Therapeutics for $5.2 billion. Akero Therapeutics is a clinical stage company focusing on the treatment of metabolic dysfunction-associated steatohepatitis (MASH).

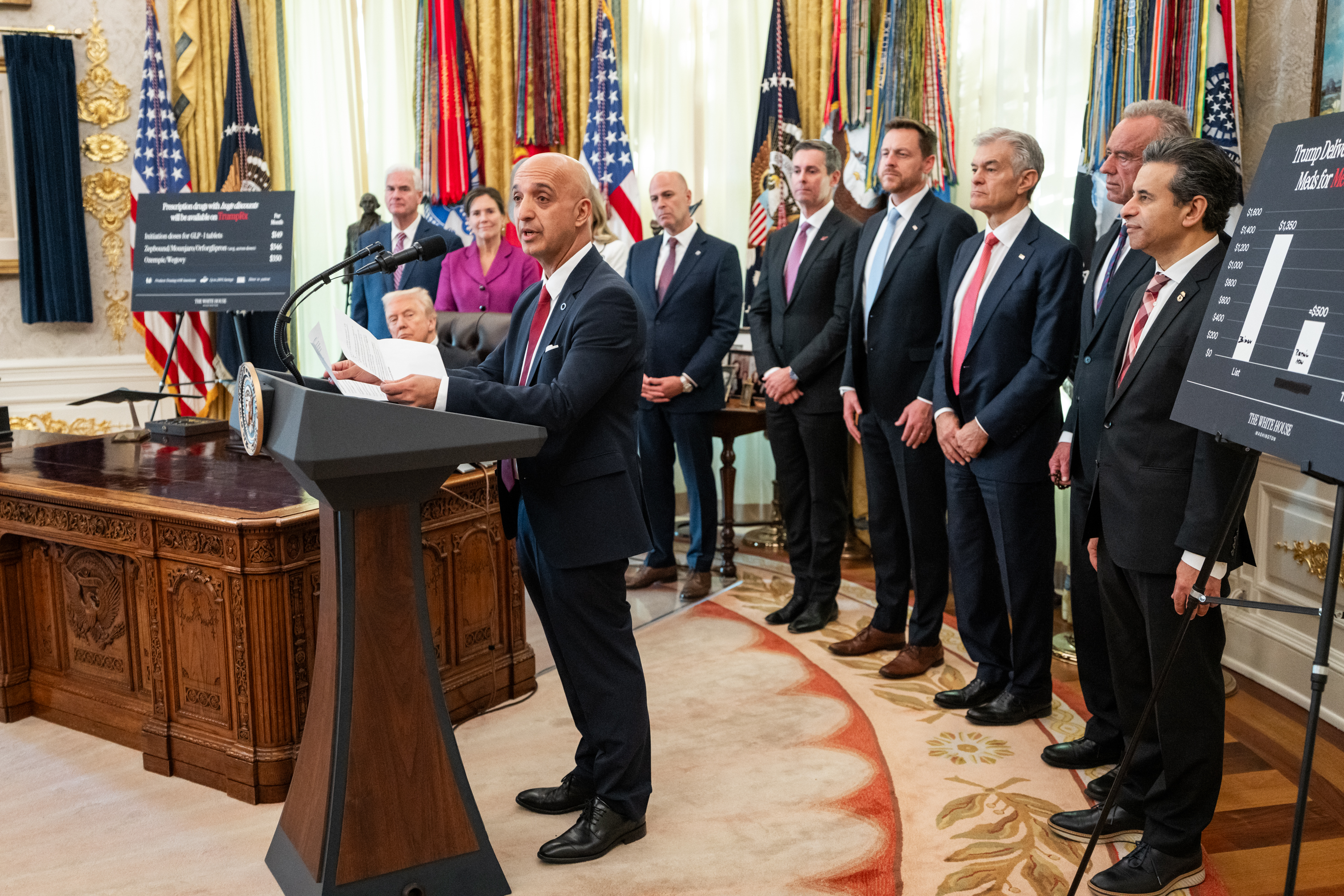
President and CEO of Novo, Mike Doustdar, during a meeting with U.S. President Donald Trump in the Oval Office in November 2025

In November 2025, United States President Donald Trump announced a deal with Novo to lower the costs of Ozempic, including monthly prices of about $245 for injectables and $149 for some oral versions for people on Medicare and Medicaid and for those who use his TrumpRx platform.

In 2026, Novo launched obesity GLP-1 pills.

Novo filed a federal lawsuit against Eli Lilly and Company in July 2026 in the District of New Jersey, alleging that Eli Lilly engaged in false advertising regarding its weight-loss and diabetes medications. The complaint accuses Lilly of misrepresenting comparative clinical data and omitting key information to gain an unfair advantage in the U.S. anti-obesity medication market.

== Products ==
Novo produces the drug semaglutide, used to treat diabetes under the brand names Ozempic and Rybelsus and obesity under the brand name Wegovy. Novo is also involved with hemostasis management, growth hormone therapy, and hormone replacement therapy. The company makes several drugs under various brand names, including NovoLog, NovoSeven, NovoEight, Saxenda, Tresiba, and Victoza.

== Toxicogenomics ==
Novo is involved in government funded collaborative research projects with other industrial and governmental partners. One example in the area of non-clinical safety assessment is the InnoMed PredTox. The company is expanding its activities in joint research projects within the framework of the Innovative Medicines Initiative of European Federation of Pharmaceutical Industries and Associations and the European Commission.

== Research and pipeline ==
Novo was researching pulmonary delivery systems for diabetic medications, and in the early stages of research into autoimmune and chronic inflammatory diseases, using technologies such as translational immunology and monoclonal antibodies. In September 2014, the company announced a decision to discontinue all research in inflammatory disorders, including the discontinuation of R&D in anti-IL-20 for the treatment of rheumatoid arthritis.

In September 2018, it was reported that the company would lay off 400 administrative staff, laboratory technicians and scientists, in Denmark and China in order to concentrate research and development efforts on "transformational biological and technological innovation".

In 2025, Novo tested whether semaglutide helped slow progression for Alzheimer's disease. However, on 24 November 2025, the company announced that the studies failed to find any effect of the drug on cognition and functioning in people with mild cognitive impairment or with dementia.

== Legal issues ==
In 2010, Novo breached the code of conduct for Association of the British Pharmaceutical Industry (ABPI), by failing to provide information about side-effects of Victoza and by promoting Victoza prior to being granted market authorisation.

In 2013, Novo had to pay back 3.6 billion kr. to the Danish tax authorities due to transfer mispricing.

In March 2013, a debate emerged in which scientists questioned whether the incretin class of diabetic medications – the class to which Victoza belongs – had an increased risk of side effects in the pancreas such as pancreatitis and pancreatic cancer. It was concluded that data currently available did not confirm these concerns.

In October 2013, batches of NovoMix 30 FlexPen and Penfill insulin were recalled in some European countries as their analysis had shown that a small percentage of the products in these batches did not meet the specifications for insulin strength.

In September 2017, Novo agreed to pay $58.7 million to end a United States Department of Justice probe into the lack of FDA disclosure to doctors about the cancer risk for their diabetic drug, Victoza.

In March 2023, Novo was suspended from the ABPI for a period of two years, for engaging in misleading marketing practices that amounted to "bribing health professionals with inducement to prescribe". This is only the eighth time in the last 40 years that ABPI sanctioned a member organization. Consequently, the Royal College of General Practitioners and the Royal College of Physicians ended their corporate partnerships as it would be in breach of their ethical guidance. The Novo UK General Manager, Pinder Sahota, chose to resign as President of the ABPI prior to the suspension.

In August 2023, one of the first lawsuits was filed alleging that Novo's Ozempic and Eli Lilly's Mounjaro (tirzepatide) caused severe gastrointestinal side effects, including gastroparesis. The lawsuit was brought on behalf of Jaclyn Bjorklund, a Louisiana woman represented by Morgan & Morgan, who alleged that she suffered persistent vomiting and other serious injuries after using the drugs and that the manufacturers failed to adequately warn patients and physicians about the risks.

In September 2023, the law firm Motley Rice filed a lawsuit on behalf of a Pennsylvania woman who had been taking weight-loss drug Wegovy. The lawsuit alleges that the plaintiff experienced severe stomach cramping, vomiting, and nausea requiring hospitalization, and that Novo failed to adequately warn patients about the risk of gastroparesis.

In February 2024, the United States Judicial Panel on Multidistrict Litigation ordered that 55 lawsuits pending in federal courts be consolidated into a multidistrict litigation. The majority of the cases were against Novo, but some were brought against Eli Lilly. As of August 2024 there were 235 active Ozempic lawsuits. Following the consolidation, the court appointed a plaintiffs' leadership committee to coordinate the litigation, which included attorneys from the law firms Susen Law Group, Motley Rice, Levin Papantonio, Morgan & Morgan, Pogust Goodhead, and Johnson Becker.

In 2024 Novo drug pricing in the US has been a target of lawmakers, including Senator Bernie Sanders and the Senate committee Health, Education, Labor and Pensions (HELP). The committee investigation found Novo's drug Ozempic priced for $969 per month in the US, compared to $155 in Canada and $59 in Germany. Its weight-loss drug Wegovy is priced for $1,349 per month in the US compared to $140 in Germany and $92 in the UK. In July 2024, US President Joe Biden joined Sanders in stating "Novo Nordisk and Eli Lilly must stop ripping off Americans with high drug prices."

In September 2024, Lars Fruergaard Jørgensen, CEO at the time was summoned to testify to the US Senate Health, Education, Labor and Pensions Committee at a hearing in Washington DC. During the hearing Senator Sanders reiterated his issues with the pricing of weight loss drug.

In 2025, the Irish Health Products Regulatory Authority identified several non-compliances relating to advertising rules in educational and training materials in 2021 and 2022. A May 2021 teaching guide did not feature statements on adverse reactions, precautions and contraindications, while materials in November 2021 and April 2022 were unbalanced and promotional in nature, and consideration was not given to the appropriateness of hiring a trainer to carry out consultations with patients during a pilot training course.

That same year, U.S. District Judge Karen Marston issued the first substantive rulings in the multidistrict litigation, dismissing several claims while allowing core allegations – including claims that the manufacturers failed to warn about gastrointestinal risks – to proceed. At that stage, the litigation encompassed more than 2,600 individual lawsuits involving Ozempic, Mounjaro, and related GLP-1 receptor agonist drugs.

== Corporate affairs ==
=== Finances ===
For the fiscal year 2025, Novo reported earnings of DKK 102.4 billion (around 15.8 billion USD), with an annual revenue of DKK 309.1 billion (around 47.7 billion USD).

Year	Revenue in bn. DKK	Net income in bn. DKK	Total assets in bn. DKK	Number of employees
2014	88.8	26.5	77.1	41,450
2015	107.9	34.9	91.8	41,122
2016	111.8	37.9	97.5	42,446
2017	111.7	38.1	102.4	42,682
2018	111.8	38.6	110.8	43,202
2019	122.0	39.0	125.6	45,323
2020	126.9	42.1	194.5	45,323
2021	140.8	47.8	194.5	47,792
2022	177.0	55.6	241.3	54,393
2023	232.3	83.7	314.5	64,319
2024	290.4	100.9	465.8	74,156
2025	309.1	102.4	542.9	69,505

=== Ownership ===
Novo shares are mostly owned by institutional investors and Novo Holdings. The largest shareholders in 2025 were:

- Novo Holdings (28.1%)
- BlackRock (4.1%)
- The Vanguard Group (2.9%)
- Norges Bank (1.8%)

=== Logo ===
The Novo logo, a bull with a sun disk between its horns, is based on the Egyptian deity Apis.

== See also ==
- Novo Nordisk Prize
- Team Novo Nordisk
