= List of systemically important banks =

Institutions whose failure may trigger a crisis

Certain large banks are tracked and labelled by several authorities as Systemically Important Financial Institutions (SIFIs), depending on the scale and the degree of influence they hold in global and domestic financial markets.

Since 2011, the Financial Stability Board (FSB) has published a list of global SIFIs (G-SIFIs), while individual countries also maintain their own lists of Domestic Systemically Important Banks (D-SIBs), also known in Europe as "national SIFIs" (N-SIFIs). In addition, special lists of regional systemically important banks (R-SIBs) also exist. The European Central Bank has separate criteria to designate credit institutions as "significant" under the framework of European Banking Supervision.

== Background ==
In 2009, as a regulatory response to the revealed vulnerability of the banking sector in the 2008 financial crisis, and attempting to come up with a solution to solve the "too big to fail" interdependence between G-SIFIs and the economy of sovereign states, the Financial Stability Board (FSB) started to develop a method to identify G-SIFIs to which a set of stricter requirements would apply. The first publication of some leaked unofficial G-SIFI lists, during a time when the FSB identification method was still being tested and subject for subsequent adjustments, took place in November 2009 and November 2010. The first official version of the G-SIFI list was published by FSB in November 2011. The established nomenclature G-SIFI was supplemented and in large part replaced by the idea of a Global Systemically Important Bank (G-SIB) and has ever since been updated each year in November. This G-SIB list is the first one shown below.

All G-SIBs and D-SIBs with headquarters in the US and Europe are required each year to submit an updated emergency Resolution Plan to their Financial Supervision Authority. Basel III also requires that all identified G-SIBs no later than March 2018, shall operate with a minimum total capital adequacy ratio comprising:

- Max. 2% Tier 2 capital (Subordinated capital).
- High quality Tier 1 capital (Common Equity Tier 1 capital). This requirement towards G-SIBs depend on an indicator-based measure of size, interconnectedness, complexity, non-substitutibility and global reach, elevating it to be 1.0% or 1.5% or 2.0% or 2.5% or 3.5% higher, compared to the similar Basel III capital requirement at 7% towards banks not contained on the list.
- Max. 1.5% Additional Tier 1 capital (Hybrid capital, i.e. Contingent Convertibles aka CoCos).

In addition to the Basel III Capital Adequacy Ratio requirements, on November 10, 2014 the FSB issued a consultative document that defines a global standard for minimum amounts of Total Loss Absorbency Capacity ("TLAC") to be held by G-SIBs. The TLAC are amounts to be held in addition to the Capital Adequacy Ratio requirements, by G-SIBs. This proposal was under consultation until February 2, 2015, when the requirement was finalized. The FSB issued the final minimum total loss-absorbing capacity (TLAC) standard for 30 G-SIBs 9 November 2015. (See "MREL" for EU institutions.)

The second set of lists, further below, includes all those financial institutions having been identified as systemically important by a national regulator, the so-called D-SIBs. For the United States, this list include all those financial institutions not being big enough for G-SIB status, but still with high enough domestic systemically importance making them subject to the most stringent annual Stress Test (USA-ST) by the Federal Reserve.

In 2013, the EU also adopted a regulation to identify all Domestic SIBs within each member state of the European Economic Area (EEA), which after a phase-in during 2015–18, then shall comply with some even higher total capital adequacy ratio requirements – in accordance with how systemically important they are. Beside of expanding the SIB list, so that it now both include G-SIBs and D-SIBs, the regulation also ensure that all European G-SIBs (with headquarters in one of the EEA member states), will face some higher capital adequacy ratio requirements compared to those required by the FSB.

Both Basel III and the EU regulation, also introduced a potential counter-cyclical capital ratio buffer, which can be enforced by national authorities on top of the noted total capital adequacy ratios, with demands of up till 2.5% extra Common Equity Tier 1 capital towards all financial institutions (incl. SIBs), during years where the total lending in the specific nation starts to grow faster than the national GDP.

== List of Global Systemically Important Banks (G-SIBs) ==
Countercyclical capital buffers
Tier	1	2	3	4	5
Buffer	1.0%	1.5%	2.0%	2.5%	3.5%

Entity
Tier	2025 (29)	2024 (29)	2023 (29)	2022 (30)
5	(Empty)	(Empty)	(Empty)	(Empty)
4	JP Morgan Chase	JP Morgan Chase	JP Morgan Chase	JP Morgan Chase
3	▲ Bank of America; Citigroup; HSBC; ▲ICBC	Citigroup; HSBC	Bank of America; Citigroup; HSBC	▲ Bank of America; Citigroup; HSBC
2	Agricultural Bank of China; Bank of China; Barclays; BNP Paribas; China Construction Bank; Goldman Sachs; Group Crédit Agricole; MUFG; UBS	Agricultural Bank of China; ▼ Bank of America; Bank of China; Barclays; BNP Paribas; China Construction Bank; ▲ Crédit Agricole; Deutsche Bank; Goldman Sachs; ICBC; MUFG; UBS	▲ Agricultural Bank of China; Bank of China; Barclays; BNP Paribas; ▲ China Construction Bank; Deutsche Bank; Goldman Sachs; ICBC; MUFG; ▲UBS	Bank of China; Barclays; ▼BNP Paribas; Deutsche Bank; Goldman Sachs; ICBC; MUFG
1	Bank of Communications (BoCom); Bank of New York Mellon; ▼ Deutsche Bank; Groupe BPCE; ING; Mizuho FG; Morgan Stanley; Royal Bank of Canada; Banco Santander; Société Générale; Standard Chartered; State Street; Sumitomo Mitsui; Toronto-Dominion Bank; Wells Fargo	Bank of Communications (BoCom); Bank of New York Mellon; Groupe BPCE; ING; Mizuho FG; Morgan Stanley; Royal Bank of Canada; Banco Santander; Société Générale; Standard Chartered; State Street; Sumitomo Mitsui; Toronto-Dominion Bank; Wells Fargo	▲ Bank of Communications (BoCom); Bank of New York Mellon; Groupe BPCE; Crédit Agricole; ING; Mizuho FG; Morgan Stanley; Royal Bank of Canada; Banco Santander; Société Générale; Standard Chartered; State Street; Sumitomo Mitsui; Toronto-Dominion Bank; Wells Fargo	Agricultural Bank of China; Bank of New York Mellon; ▼ China Construction Bank; Credit Suisse; Groupe BPCE; Crédit Agricole; ING; Mizuho FG; Morgan Stanley; Royal Bank of Canada; Banco Santander; Société Générale; Standard Chartered; State Street; Sumitomo Mitsui; Toronto-Dominion Bank; UBS; UniCredit; Wells Fargo

History of tiers per year
Entity	2025	2024	2023	2022	2021	2020	2019	2018	2017	2016	2015	2014	2013	2012
Agricultural Bank of China	2	2	▲2	1	1	1	1	1	1	1	1	▲1		
(United States) Bank of America	▲3	▼2	3	▲3	2	2	2	▼2	3	▲3	2	2	2	2
Bank of China	2	2	2	2	2	2	2	2	▲2	1	1	1	1	1
(China) Bank of Communications	1	1	▲1											
(China) ICBC	▲3	2	2	▲2	1	1	1	1	1	1	1	1	1	
(Germany) Deutsche Bank	▼1	2	2	2	2	2	▼2	3	3	3	3	3	▼3	4
(United States) Goldman Sachs	2	2	2	2	2	1	2	2	2	2	2	2	2	2
(France) BPCE	1	1	1	1	1	1	1	▲1	▼ dropped	1	1	1	1	1
(France) Crédit Agricole	2	▲2	1	1	1	1	1	1	1	1	1	▼1	▲2	1
(Netherlands) ING	1	1	1	1	1	1	1	1	1	1	1	1	1	1
(Japan) Mitsubishi UFJ FG	2	2	2	2	2	2	2	2	2	2	2	2	2	2
(Japan) Mizuho FG	1	1	1	1	1	1	1	1	1	1	1	1	1	1
(United States) Morgan Stanley	1	1	1	1	1	1	1	1	1	▼1	2	2	2	2
Royal Bank of Canada	1	1	1	1	1	1	1	1	1					
(Spain) Santander	1	1	1	1	1	1	1	1	1	1	1	1	1	1
(France) Société Générale	1	1	1	1	1	1	1	1	1	1	1	1	1	1
(United Kingdom) Standard Chartered	1	1	1	1	1	1	1	1	1	1	1	1	1	1
(United States) State Street	1	1	1	1	1	1	1	1	1	1	1	1	1	1
(Japan) Sumitomo Mitsui FG	1	1	1	1	1	1	1	1	1	1	1	1	1	1
(Canada) Toronto Dominion	1	1	1	1	1	1	▲1							
(Switzerland) UBS	2	2	▲2	1	1	1	1	1	1	1	1	▼1	2	2
(United States) Wells Fargo	1	1	1	1	1	▼1	2	2	2	▲2	1	1	1	1

== Lists of Domestic Systemically Important Banks (D-SIBs) ==
=== D-SIBs in the US ===
For the United States, the D-SIB include those financial institutions not being big enough for G-SIB status, but still with high enough domestic systemically importance making them subject to the most stringent annual Stress Test (USA-ST) by the Federal Reserve. Strictly speaking, the Financial Stability Oversight Council (FSOC) does not designate any banks or bank holding companies as systemically important, but the Dodd–Frank Act in its terms on the statute imposes heightened supervision standards (including being subject to the annual USA Stress Test) on any bank holding company with a larger than $50 billion balance sheet. Despite the lack of any official D-SIB designation, the banks being subject to the USA Stress Test can be considered to be D-SIBs in the US. The group of banks being stress tested was identical throughout 2009–2013, except for MetLife Bank ceasing its banking and mortgage lending activities in 2012 – and therefore subsequently leaving the group of supervised entities. In 2014 the stress test was expanded from 18 to 30 banks, as a result of a phase-in of the provisions of the Board's Dodd–Frank Act stress test rules, only making the additional 12 entities subject to this stress test starting from 2014.

All G-SIBs and D-SIBs with headquarters in the US are not only required to comply with some stricter capital ratio requirements but also required to submit an updated emergency Resolution Plan each year to the Board of Governors of the Federal Reserve System.

Legend
Former D-SIB

List of all domestic systemically important banks in the US
Entity	Region	HQ country	Reporting currency	FSB-G-SIB	USA-ST	HQ regulator	Major exchange(s)	IR	Notes
Ally Financial	Americas	US	$, USD		2009–	FSOC	NYSE	IR	Formerly GMAC Inc.
American Express	Americas	US	$, USD		2009–	FSOC	NYSE	IR	
Truist Financial	Americas	US	$, USD		2009–	FSOC	NYSE	IR	
BMO Financial Corp.	Americas	US	$, USD		2014–	FSOC		IR	Subsidiary of Bank of Montreal. Formerly Harris Financial Corp.
Capital One Financial	Americas	US	$, USD		2009–	FSOC	NYSE	IR	
Comerica	Americas	US	$, USD		2014–	FSOC	NYSE	IR	
Fifth Third Bank	Americas	US	$, USD		2009–	FSOC	NASDAQ	IR	
HSBC North America Holdings	Americas	US	$, USD		2014–	FSOC		IR	Subsidiary of HSBC Holdings
Huntington Bancshares	Americas	US	$, USD		2014–	FSOC	NASDAQ	IR	
KeyCorp	Americas	US	$, USD		2009–	FSOC	NYSE	IR	
M&T Bank	Americas	US	$, USD		2014–	FSOC	NYSE	IR	
MetLife	Americas	US	$, USD		2009‑12	FSOC	NYSE	IR	Failed the stress test in 2012, and consequently sold its banking unit to GE Capital and its mortgage servicing business to JPMorgan Chase.
Northern Trust	Americas	US	$, USD		2014–	FSOC	NASDAQ	IR	
PNC Financial Services	Americas	US	$, USD		2009–	FSOC	NYSE	IR	
RBS Citizens Financial Group	Americas	US	$, USD		2014–	FSOC	NYSE	IR	
Regions Financial	Americas	US	$, USD		2009–	FSOC	NYSE	IR	
Santander Holdings USA	Americas	US	$, USD		2014–	FSOC	NYSE	IR	Subsidiary of Santander Group
SunTrust Banks	Americas	US	$, USD		2009–	FSOC	NYSE	IR	Now Truist Financial through merger with BB&T.
U.S. Bancorp	Americas	US	$, USD		2009–	FSOC	NYSE	IR	
UnionBanCal	Americas	US	$, USD		2014–	FSOC		IR	Subsidiary of Mitsubishi UFJ FG
Zions	Americas	US	$, USD		2014–	FSOC	NYSE, NASDAQ	IR	

=== D-SIBs within each of the EEA member states (both domestic and global) ===
In 2013 a new SIB regulation was formulated and adopted by the European Union, which outlined the responsibility for each EU member state and all of the three other EEA member states, to compose a list of all their domestic SIBs (with the term including not only ordinary banks – but also credit institutions and investment firms), and implement some new total capital ratio requirements towards these identified D-SIBs. The total capital ratio requirements towards D-SIBs, will be stricter than the minimum 10.5% required by Basel III towards all normal sized financial institutions, which comprise a requirement of:

- max. 2% Tier 2 capital (Subordinated capital).
- max. 1.5% Additional Tier 1 capital (Hybrid capital, i.e. Contingent Convertibles aka CoCos).
- min. 7% high quality Tier 1 capital (Common Equity Tier 1 capital).

The new stricter EU regulated capital requirements, applying towards all "credit institutions or investment firms" identified as being a D-SIB, basically adds further high quality Common Equity Tier 1 capital buffers on top of the above 10.5% Basel III minimum capital requirement, to be phased in during 2015–2019, with full effect for the calendar year 2019. In addition, the new EU rules also requires all instruments recognised in the Additional Tier 1 capital of any "credit institution or investment firm" to be Contingent Convertibles with the attached clause, that it automatically will be either written down or converted into Common Equity Tier 1 instruments if the Common Equity Tier 1 capital ratio of the institution at any point of time falls below 5.125%.

Each national SIB list of the EEA Member States include: The already identified G-SIBs with headquarters in the concerned state, and the Other Systemically Important Institutions (O-SII; which include R-SIBs and D-SIBs) with headquarters/branches in the concerned state - to be identified at the latest on 31 December 2015. The European Banking Authority has published some mandatory guidelines on how the O-SIIs shall be identified in each EEA Member State, which will take effect on 1 January 2015. All identified SIBs in the list below are subject to the new elevated capital ratio requirements, which can be introduced immediately (as in Sweden) or phased in during 2015–2019 (as in Denmark).

Identified SIBs of EEA member states

- Cyprus
  - Bank of Cyprus
  - Hellenic Bank
  - RCB Bank
  - Eurobank Cyprus
- Denmark
  - Danske Bank
  - Nordea Denmark
  - Nykredit
  - Jyske Bank
  - Sydbank
  - DLR
- France
  - BNP Paribas
  - Crédit Agricole
  - Groupe BPCE
  - Société Générale
- Germany
  - Deutsche Bank
- Greece
  - National Bank of Greece
  - Alpha Bank
  - Eurobank Ergasias Bank
- Italy
  - Unicredit Group
  - Intesa Sanpaolo
  - Monte dei Paschi di Siena
- Malta
  - HSBC Bank Malta
  - Bank of Valletta
  - MeDirect Bank Malta
- Netherlands
  - ING Bank
  - Rabobank
  - ABN AMRO
  - De Volksbank
- Norway
  - DNB ASA
  - Nordea Bank Norge ASA
  - Kommunalbanken
- Spain
  - Banco Santander
  - BBVA
  - Caixabank
  - Banco Sabadell
- Sweden
  - Swedbank
  - Svenska Handelsbanken
  - SEB
  - Nordea

Notes

In addition to the total capital ratio requirements noted above, each EEA member state will – as regulated by CRD4 – be allowed also to introduce counter-cyclical capital ratio buffers of up to 2.5% extra Common Equity Tier 1 capital, applying for all financial institutions (incl. SIBs) at the national level, if their national statistics measure the total lending to grow faster than the national GDP.

==== Additional capital buffer requirements for the resolution phase ====
As of December 2013, the EU institutions also started the technical process to approve a new Bank Recovery and Resolution Directive, with entry into force on 1 January 2015, which also outlined the requirement of an extra crisis-management capital buffer, referred to as Minimum Requirement for own funds and Eligible Liabilities (MREL), to be decided by resolution authorities on a case-by-case basis. The directive so far did not quantify or specify minimum standards for how big the MREL needs to be. MREL aims to ensure that all firms have adequate total loss-absorbing capacity to be used in a possible resolution phase, including sufficient liabilities that could credibly be exposed to loss in resolution. All EU banks and investment firms will be subject to the MREL requirement, which will be set depending on firm specific risk assessments, from January 2016 at the latest. Separately, the FSB is also working on a proposal on Gone-concern Loss-Absorbing Capacity (GLAC) – such as long-term bonded debt – that will apply for G-SIBs. By ensuring that there are a sufficient amount of liabilities available to be bailed in at the point of resolution, GLAC will complement the MREL requirement.

MREL and GLAC are treated (just like leverage ratio requirements), as separate requirements from the total capital ratio requirement.

=== D-SIBs situated outside EEA or US (both domestic and global) ===
==== Africa ====
- Namibia
  - Bank Windhoek Limited
  - First National Bank Namibia, part of the South African FirstRand group
  - Nedbank Namibia Limited, part of the South African Nedbank group
  - Standard Bank Namibia, part of the South African Standard Bank group
- South Africa
  - Absa Bank
  - Standard Bank
  - FirstRand
  - Nedbank
  - Investec
  - Capitec Bank

==== Americas ====
- Canada
  - Bank of Montreal
  - Scotiabank
  - Canadian Imperial Bank of Commerce
  - National Bank of Canada
  - Royal Bank of Canada
  - Toronto-Dominion Bank
  - Desjardins Group

==== Asia ====
- China
  - Bank of China
  - ICBC
  - Agricultural Bank of China
  - China Construction Bank
  - Bank of Communications
  - China Merchants Bank
  - Industrial Bank
  - China CITIC Bank
  - Postal Savings Bank of China
  - Shanghai Pudong Development Bank
  - China Minsheng Bank
  - China Everbright Bank
  - Ping An Bank
  - Huaxia Bank
  - Bank of Ningbo
  - China Guangfa Bank
  - Bank of Jiangsu
  - Bank of Shanghai
  - Bank of Beijing
  - Bank of Nanjing
- Hong Kong
  - HSBC (Hong Kong)
  - Bank of China (Hong Kong)
  - Standard Chartered Hong Kong
  - Hang Seng Bank
  - Industrial and Commercial Bank of China (Asia)
- India
  - State Bank of India
  - ICICI Bank
  - HDFC Bank
- Indonesia
  - Bank Rakyat Indonesia
  - Bank Mandiri
  - Bank Central Asia
  - Bank Negara Indonesia
- Japan
  - MUFG Bank
  - Mizuho FG
  - Sumitomo Mitsui
  - Nomura
  - Daiwa
  - Norinchukin Bank
- Malaysia
  - Maybank
  - CIMB Bank
  - Public Bank
- Pakistan
  - National Bank of Pakistan
  - Habib Bank Limited
  - United Bank Limited
- Singapore
  - DBS Bank
  - OCBC Bank
  - UOB
  - Citibank
  - Maybank
  - Standard Chartered Bank
  - HSBC
- South Korea
  - Hana Financial Group
    - Hana Bank
  - KB Financial Group
    - Kookmin Bank
  - NH Financial Group
    - Nonghyup Bank
  - Shinhan Financial Group
    - Shinhan Bank
  - Woori Financial Group
    - Woori Bank
- Taiwan
  - CTBC Bank
  - Cathay United Bank
  - Taipei Fubon Bank
  - Mega International Commercial Bank
  - Taiwan Cooperative Bank
  - First Bank

==== Europe ====
- Russia (suspended until 2028 due to active military action)
  - Sberbank
  - VTB Bank
  - Gazprombank
  - Russian Agricultural Bank
  - Otkritie FC Bank
  - UniCredit Bank
  - Raiffeisenbank
  - Promsvyazbank
  - Alfa-Bank
  - Rosbank
  - Credit Bank of Moscow
  - Sovcombank
  - T-Bank
- Switzerland
  - Credit Suisse
  - UBS
  - Zürcher Kantonalbank
  - Raiffeisen
  - PostFinance
- Ukraine
  - Privatbank
  - Oschadbank
  - Ukreximbank
  - Ukrgasbank
  - Raiffeisen Bank
  - uk:Таскомбанк
  - uk:Універсал Банк
  - A-Bank
  - Sense Bank
  - First Ukrainian International Bank
  - Ukrsibbank
  - KredoBank
  - uk:OTP Bank Ukraine
  - uk:Південний (банк)
  - Crédit Agricole Bank
- United Kingdom
  - HSBC
  - Barclays
  - Nationwide Building Society
  - Standard Chartered Bank
  - Lloyds Banking Group
  - Santander UK
  - NatWest Group
  - The Co-operative Bank

==== Oceania ====
- Australia
  - Australia & New Zealand Banking Group
  - Commonwealth Bank
  - National Australia Bank
  - Westpac

== See also ==
- For general reference see: systemically important financial institution, particularly the section on banks
- For a list of some of the largest banks by assets see: list of largest banks
- For more comprehensive lists of banks see lists of banks
- International lender of last resort
