= Roskilde Bank =

Danish Bank

- Founded: 1884
- Headquarters: Roskilde, Denmark
- Website: www.roskildebank.dk

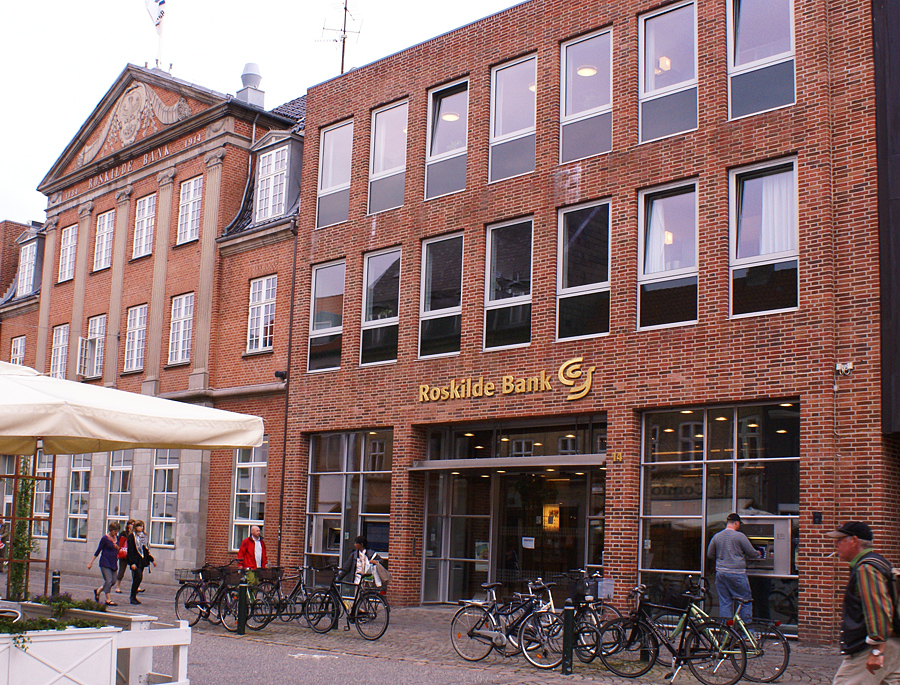
Roskilde Bank

Roskilde Bank was a local Danish bank founded in 1884. It was based in Roskilde with branches over much of Region Hovedstaden. It merged in 1996 and was taken over by the Danish National Bank in 2008.

== History ==
Roskilde Bank was founded in 1884 and in 1996 merged with Ringsted Sparekasse. On 24 August 2008 it was acquired by the Danish National Bank after running into financial trouble due to the decline of the Danish property market. The Bank remains formally listed on the Copenhagen Stock Exchange, but trading has been suspended. The Bank had approximately 32,000 shareholders. The Bank was, according to the Finance Council's statement, Denmark's 10th largest bank.

=== Danish National Bank acquires Roskilde Bank ===
On 24 August 2008, the National Bank officially stated that, together with the Private Contingency Body for Settlement of needy banks, savings and cooperative societies, it had taken over the bank because it was insolvent and could not find a buyer. This was the first time since 1928 that the Danish National Bank had taken over another bank.

The loss is assumed to be between £3-6 billion, but circulating allegations maintain that the loss in the worst case could amount to 37 billion Kroner. The 33000 shareholders also stand to lose their money.

=== Sale of subsidiaries ===
On 29 September 2008 Roskilde Bank signed agreements for the sale of a total of 21 branches, including 9 branches to Nordea, 7 branches to Spar Nord Bank and 5 branches to Arbejdernes Landsbank.

== See also ==
- List of banks in Denmark
