= Ringkøbing Landbobank =

Ringkjøbing Landbobank A/S

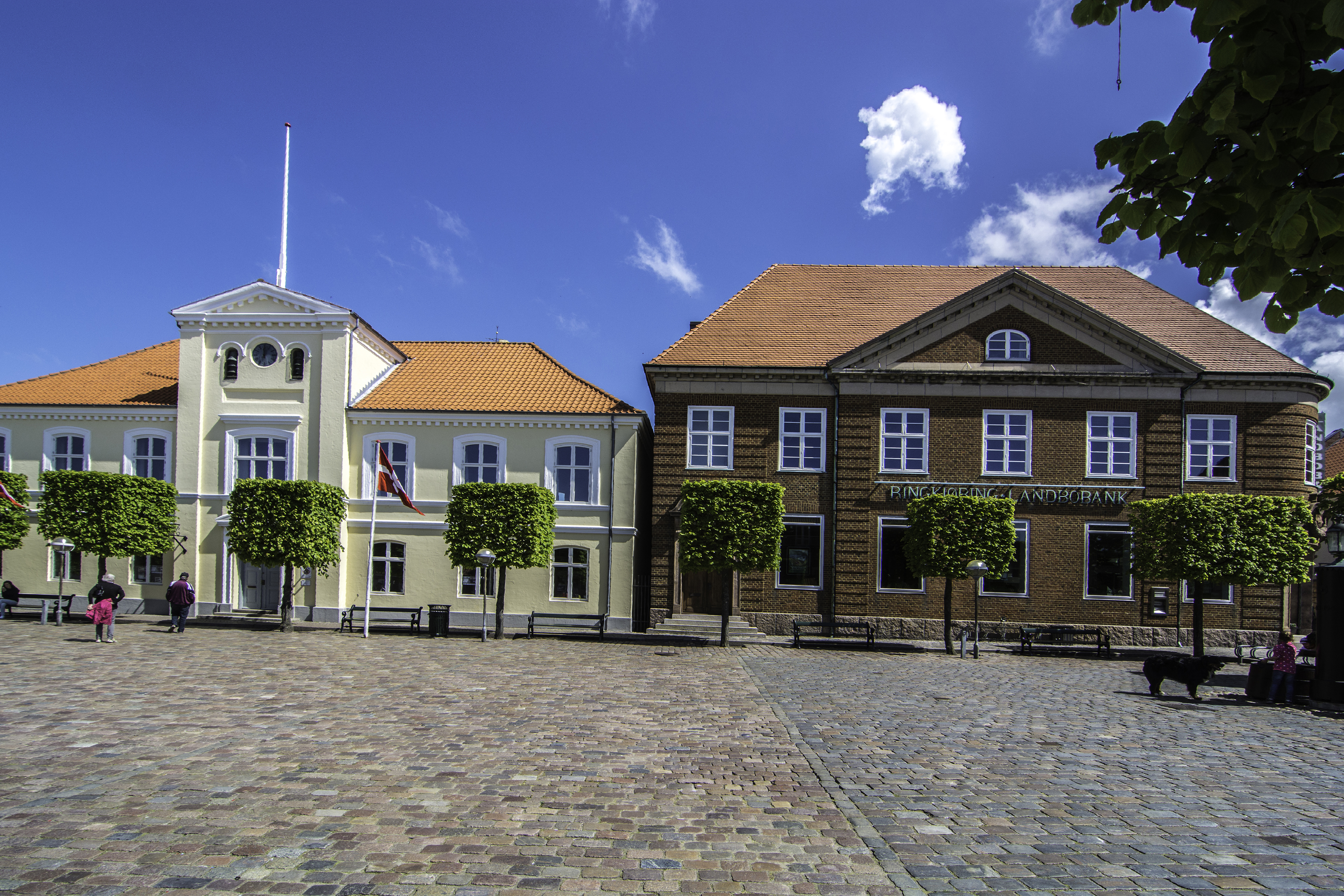
- Traded as: Nasdaq Copenhagen: RILBA
- Industry: Bank, financial institution
- Founded: Ringkøbing, 1886
- Headquarters: Torvet 1, Ringkøbing
- Number of locations: 21 (2025)
- Key people: Martin Krogh Pedersen (chairman of the board), John Bull Fisker (CEO)
- Products: Loans, savings, investments, insurance, private banking
- Net income: 3,056,435,000 Danish krone
- Total assets: 86,309 million DKK (2025)
- Total equity: 11,568 million DKK (2025)
- Number of employees: 727 (2025)
- Website: www.rlb.dk

Ringkøbing Landbobank is a bank headquartered in Ringkøbing, Denmark. It was founded in 1886.

The bank currently (late 2025) has a share buyback programme.

It was the most popular bank in Denmark based on customer reviews in 2018, ending a nine-year stretch by the Arbejdernes Landsbank.

== Building ==
The head office is at Torvet 1 in Ringkøbing.

== Mergers and acquisition history ==
- 2018
  - Ringkøbing Landbobank 2015
    - 2004
      - 2002
        - Ringkøbing Landbobank
          est. 1886
        - Tarm Bank
      - Sdr. Lem Andelskasse
    - Ulfborg Sparekasse
  - Nordjyske Bank 2015
    - 2010
      - 2009
        - 2002
          - Egnsbank Nord 1970
            - Frederikshavn Bank
              est. 1891
            - Sæby Bank
              est. 1884
            - Skagens Bank
              est. 1926
            - Folkebanken for Frederikshavn og Omegn
              est. 1943
          - Vendsyssel Bank 1999
            - Lokalbanken i Hjørring 1977
              - Handels- og Landbrugsbanken i Hjørring
                est. 1929
        - Løkken Sparekasse
      - Øster Brønderslev Sparekasse
    - Nørresundby Sparekasse 1975
      Banken for Nørresundby
      est. 1917

== See also ==
- List of banks in Denmark
