= FIH =

FIH may refer to:

- FIH Erhvervsbank A/S, a Danish corporate and investment bank specialising in lending to Danish corporates
- Falkland Islands Holdings, a company which plays a key role in the economy of the Falkland Islands
- International Hockey Federation, the global governing body for the sport of field hockey
- The Prince's Foundation for Integrated Health, a small charity promoting the healthy lifestyle choices to promotes wellbeing
- Kinshasa International Airport's IATA airport code
- Calcium-sensing receptor, GPCR
- FIH Mobile, a mobile phone manufacturer producing Nokia-branded featurephones.

Fih may refer to:

- Fih, Lebanon, a municipality situated in Koura District
