= Thomas Borgen =

Norwegian banker and business leader

- Born: Thomas F. Borgen; 27 March 1964 (age 62); Sarpsborg, Norway
- Education: Heriot-Watt University; Syracuse University
- Occupation: Banker
- Known for: Former chief executive officer of Danske Bank
- Title: Former CEO, Danske Bank
- Term: 2013–2018
- Predecessor: Eivind Kolding
- Successor: Chris Vogelzang

Thomas F. Borgen (born 27 March 1964) is a Norwegian banker and business leader. He was chief executive officer of Danske Bank from 2013 until September 2018, when he resigned following the publication of the bank's internal investigation into the money-laundering scandal involving its Estonian branch.

== Early life and education ==
Thomas Borgen was born on 27 March 1964 in Sarpsborg, Norway. In 1987, he earned a BA in Business Organisation from Heriot-Watt University in Edinburgh, followed by an MBA in 1989 from Syracuse University in New York.

== Career ==
Borgen joined Danske Bank in 1997.

In 2009, he was appointed to Danske Bank's executive board and became responsible for the bank's activities in Norway and Sweden.

In September 2013, Borgen replaced Eivind Kolding as chief executive officer of Danske Bank.

On 19 September 2018, Borgen resigned as CEO of Danske Bank following the publication of the bank's internal investigation into the Estonia money-laundering case.

After leaving Danske Bank, Borgen has held advisory and board roles, including as a senior adviser with Bain & Company and as a board member of Wilh. Wilhelmsen Holding ASA.

== Danske Bank scandal and legal proceedings ==
The Danske Bank money-laundering scandal concerned suspicious transactions through the bank's Estonian branch between 2007 and 2015. Borgen was CEO of Danske Bank when the matter became public in 2018 and resigned after the bank released the conclusions of its internal investigation.

In 2019, Danish prosecutors brought preliminary charges against Borgen and several other former Danske Bank executives in connection with the money-laundering investigation. In April 2021, Danish prosecutors dropped the charges against Borgen and two other former senior executives.

Borgen was also sued by investors seeking compensation for losses linked to the scandal. In November 2022, a Danish court cleared him of liability in the shareholder lawsuit.
