= Eivind Kolding =

Danish businessman and entrepreneur (born 1959)

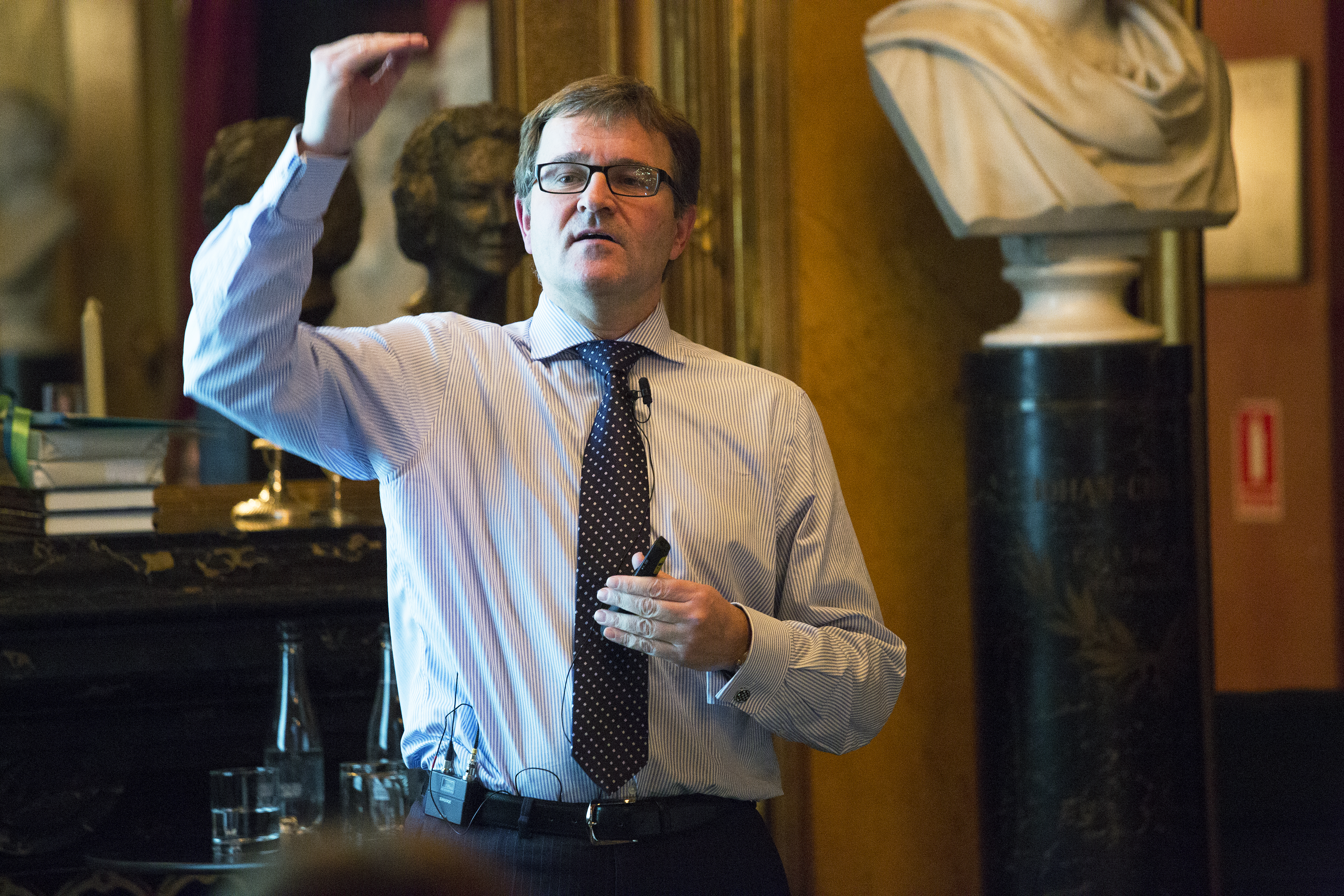
- Born: Eivind Drachmann Kolding; 16 November 1959 (age 66); Denmark
- Occupation: Lawyer
- Board member of: Danske Bank (Chairman), A.P. Moller-Maersk Group

Eivind Kolding (born 16 November 1959) is a Danish businessman and entrepreneur. He is the former CEO of Maersk Line, the world's largest container shipping company. He was also the chairman of the board at Danske Bank, which is the largest bank in Denmark, before briefly being appointed CEO until his firing in 2013. Kolding was appointed CEO of Maersk Line 1 July 2006, at which time he also became a partner at the A.P. Moller-Maersk Group. He is a member of the executive board of the company. He has held positions as managing director of Maersk Hong Kong Ltd. and as CFO in the A.P. Moller-Maersk Group, from 1998 to 2006.

== Education ==
In 1983, he graduated as MA, Law from University of Copenhagen. He was admitted lawyer to the bar in 1986, and joined A.P. Moller in 1989.

== Triple-E - the world's largest ship ==
On 21 February 2011, Eivind Kolding revealed that Maersk Line had just signed a deal with Korea's Daewoo Shipbuilding & Marine Engineering Co., ordering 10 gigantic vessels to be delivered in 2013–14. Each of these vessels will be capable of carrying 18,000 twenty foot containers, making them the largest container vessels the world has ever seen.

During the presentation in London, Eivind Kolding stated that the size and capacity of these vessels, at 400 metres long and 59 metres wide, will help reduce energy consumption and lower CO_{2} emissions far beyond what regulators imagined possible at that point. A website following the making of the vessels was also launched for the occasion, and the news caught worldwide media attention.

The name of the new vessel class is Triple-E. The three E's stand for "Economies of scale", "Energy efficient" and "Environmentally improved".

In June 2011 Maersk Line exercised its option with Daewoo to build an additional 10 Triple-E vessels.

== A call for change ==
On 7 June 2011 Eivind Kolding addressed the container shipping and logistics industry as the keynote speaker at the TOC conference in Antwerp, Belgium. He said that the container industry might be "only a few years from being completely overtaken" by new technology, and called for radical changes in the industry to “assure itself of a license to operate in the future.”

In his keynote, Eivind Kolding also pointed out what kind of radical changes he believes are necessary for the industry to survive. First, the reliability or on-time delivery of the carriers has to improve. Secondly, the industry has to be much easier to do business with. And thirdly, shipping companies need to focus even harder on the environmental impact of their operations.

On the occasion, Eivind Kolding presented a manifesto named "The new normal" with more detailed information about the thoughts and studies behind his call for change.

Eivind Kolding's call for change was well received by both media and shippers around the globe and led to both intense and constructive discussions at the website launched for the occasion. On the website, Eivind Kolding repeats the core messages from his keynote speech in Antwerp. Video recordings of his full keynote speech was later published on the internet.

== Introducing absolute reliability ==
On 12 September 2011 Eivind Kolding yet again took center stage when he revealed a new product offering by Maersk Line at a press conference in London. The product which the company has named Daily Maersk was said to be the introduction of “absolute reliability”.

Daily Maersk entails daily cut-offs, absolute reliability and promised delivery on the Asia to North Europe trade route, the largest trade route in the shipping industry.

The launch of Daily Maersk caught worldwide media attention as the press conference was streamed live on the website launched for the occasion, and the industry press reacted positively to the news.

Daily Maersk can be seen as part of Maersk Line's answer to Eivind Kolding's call for change a few months earlier.

== CEO of Danske Bank ==
On 19 December 2011 it was announced that Eivind Kolding would take over the position as CEO of Danske Bank, effective 15 February 2012. In Maersk Line, he will be replaced by Søren Skou. On 16 September 2013 he was fired immediately, and replaced by Thomas Borgen.
