= Marstal Savings Bank =

Marstal Savings Bank (Danish: Marstal Sparekasse) was a savings bank in Marstal on the island of Ærø in southern Denmark. It existed from 1822 to 1974. Its former headquarters is located at Kirkestræde 5 in Marstal.

== History ==
Marstal Savings Bank founded on 28 February 1822 by a group of local residents in Marstal. Its original name was Spare- og Laanekassen i Marstal. It was merged into Amtssparekassen for Fyn on 18 September 1974.

== See also ==
- List of banks in Denmark
