= Chris Vogelzang =

Dutch business executive (born 1962)

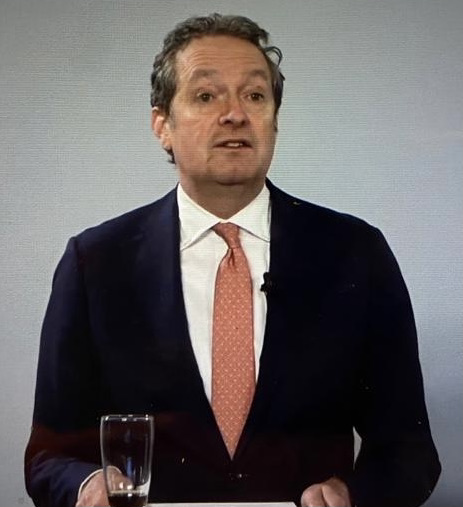
- Born: 28 November 1962 (age 63)
- Education: University of Groningen
- Occupation: Business executive
- Term: 2019-2021
- Board member of: Lloyds Banking Group and Wolters Kluwer NV

Chris Vogelzang (born 28 November 1962) is a Dutch business executive who was the CEO of Danske Bank from 2019 until 2021.

He has served as non-executive director of Wolters Kluwer NV since 18 April 2019. He is currently vice-chairman of the Supervisory Board and chairman of the Audit Committee. He is a non-executive director of Lloyds Banking Group since 16 June 2025. He also rejoined the Boston Consulting Group and the Blackstone Group as senior advisor.

Vogelzang holds a master's degree in Economics from the University of Groningen, the Netherlands. He studied History and Philosophy at Clark University, USA.

From 1988 to 2000, Vogelzang held various managerial positions in sales, marketing and oil trading with Shell in Rotterdam, London and Uganda. In 2000, he joined ABN AMRO where he was appointed CEO of retail banking in 2002, and CEO of global private banking in 2007. He was a member of the managing board from 2009 to 2017.

From 2017 to 2019, Vogelzang was senior adviser to the Boston Consulting Group and The Blackstone Group, and in June 2019, was appointed CEO of Danske Bank.

In 2021 he was named as a suspect in a probe in a violation of money laundering at Dutch lender ABN Amro. Vogelzang said that he did not want to get in the way of Danske Bank development. In 2024 the Dutch prosecutor decided not to pursue this case stating that '(...) the former executive board members each fulfilled their role or took actions that should have been suitable to address or mitigate the shortcomings'.

He was a board member of Foam Fotografiemuseum Amsterdam from 2011 to 2015, treasurer of the Prins Bernhard Cultuurfonds from 2014 to 2019 and treasurer of the board of the Rijksmuseum Amsterdam from 2015 to 2023.
