= List of banks in Denmark =

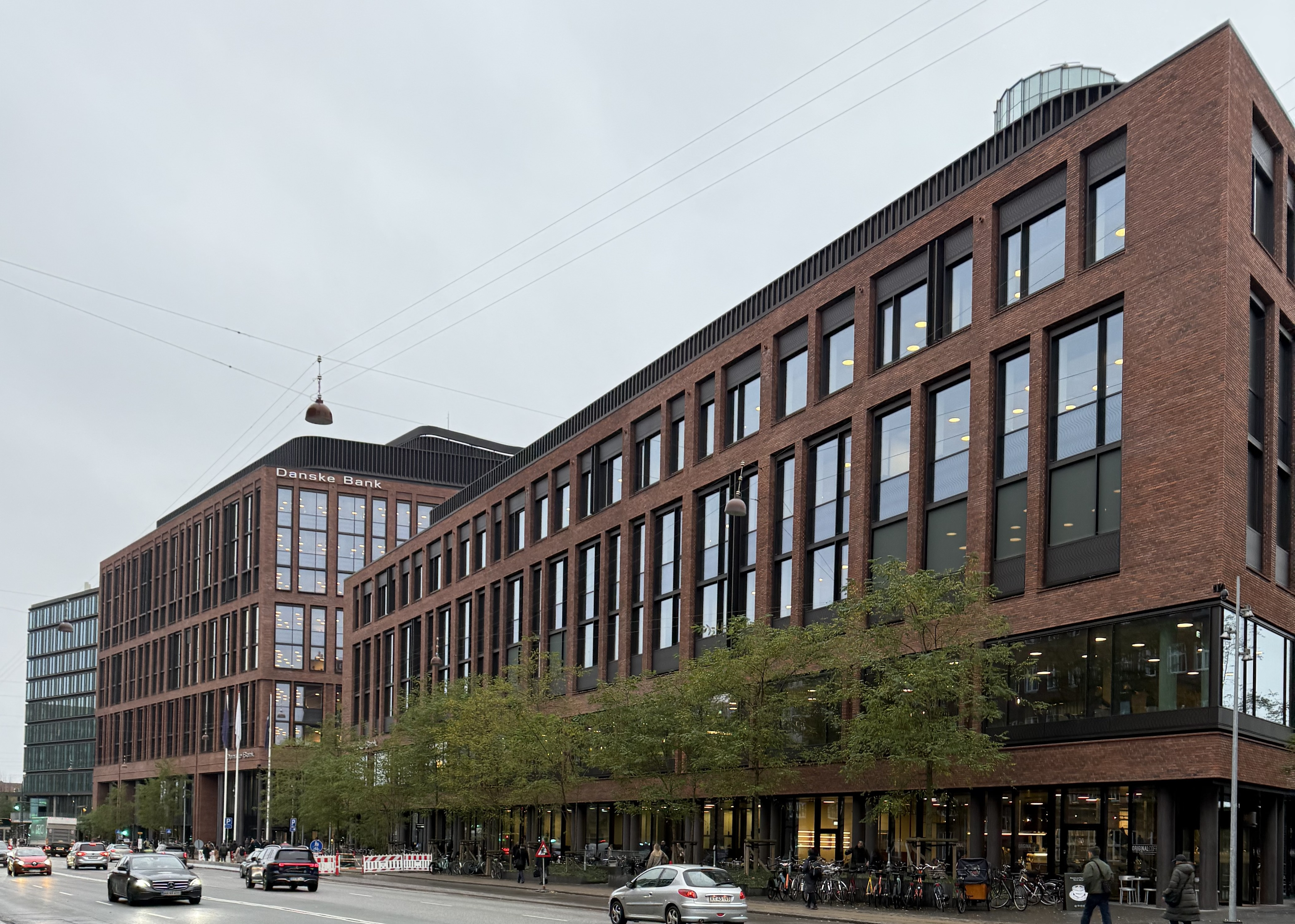
Danske Bank head office, Copenhagen

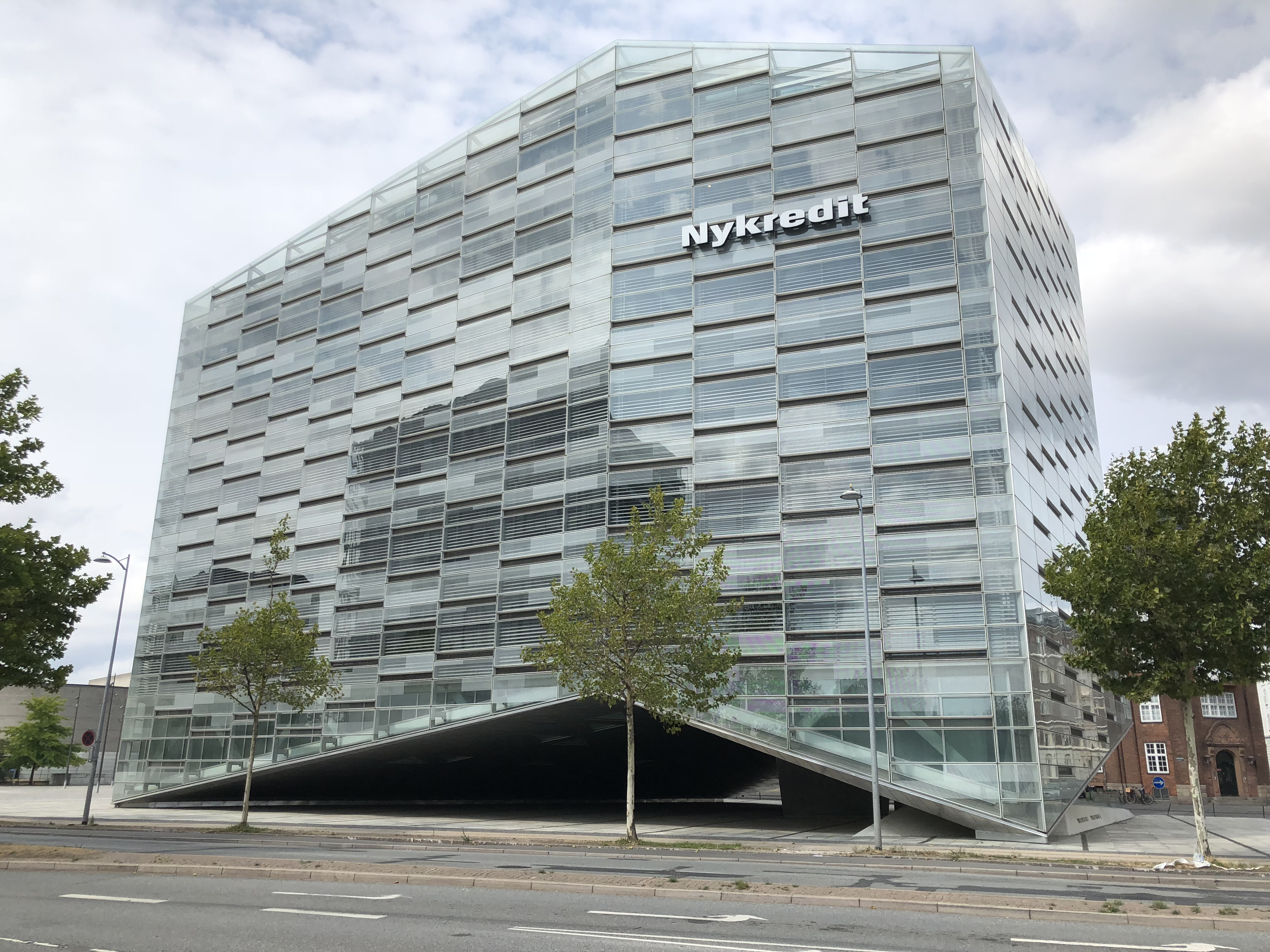
Nykredit head office, Copenhagen

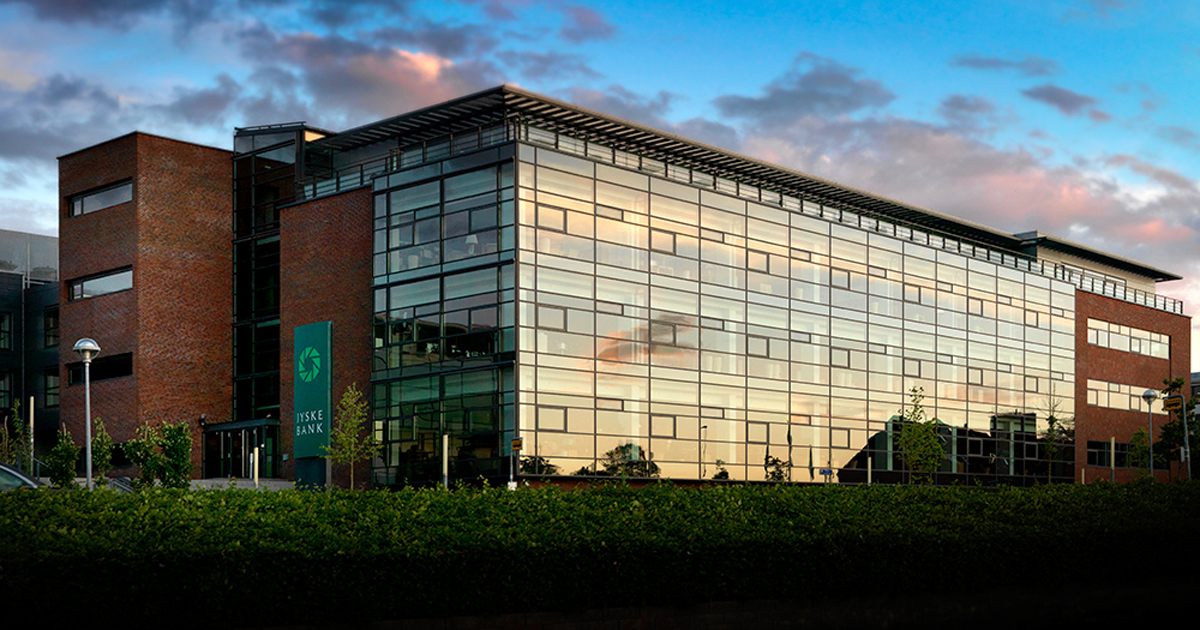
Jyske Bank head office, Silkeborg

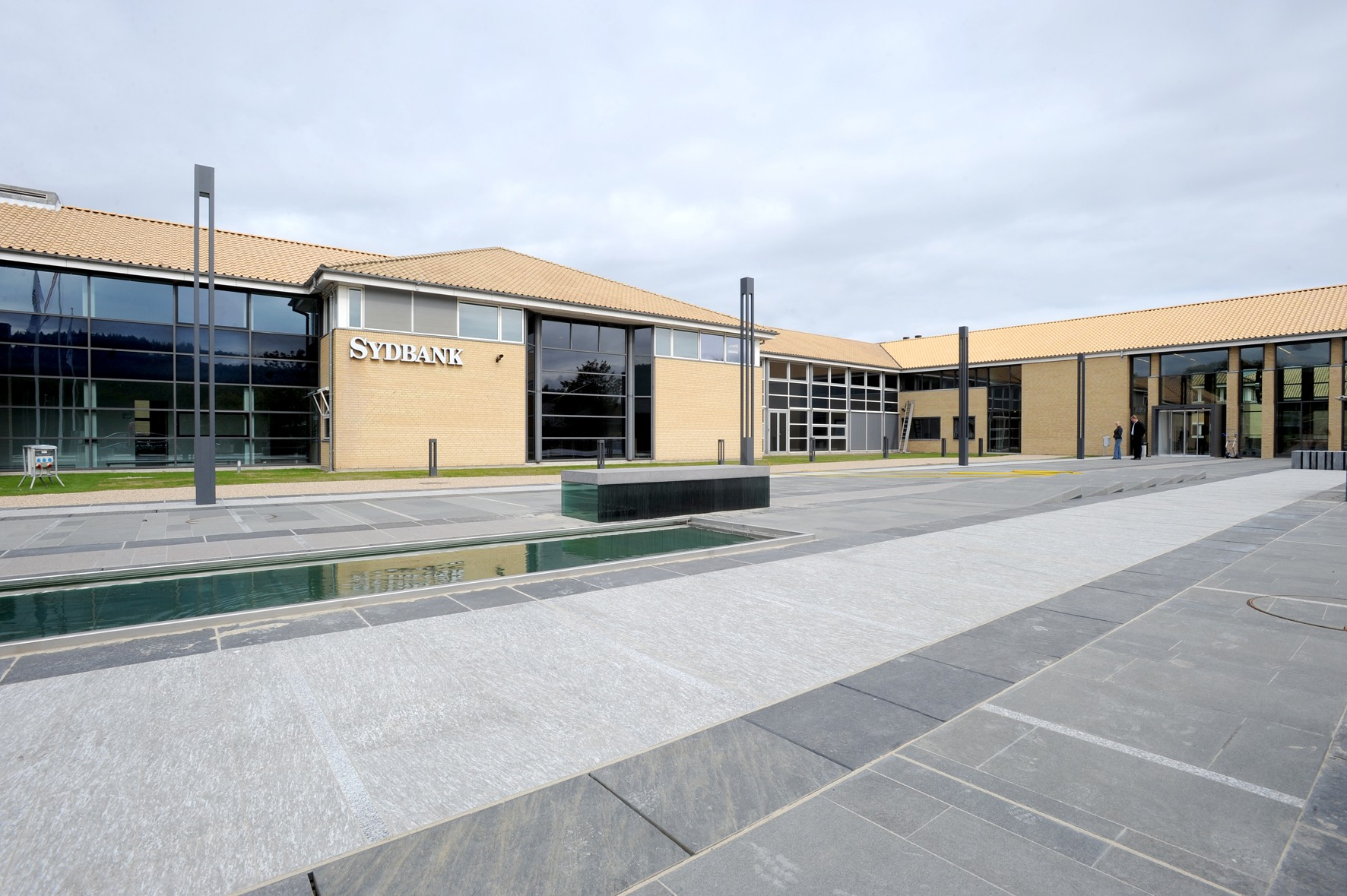
Sydbank head office, Aabenraa

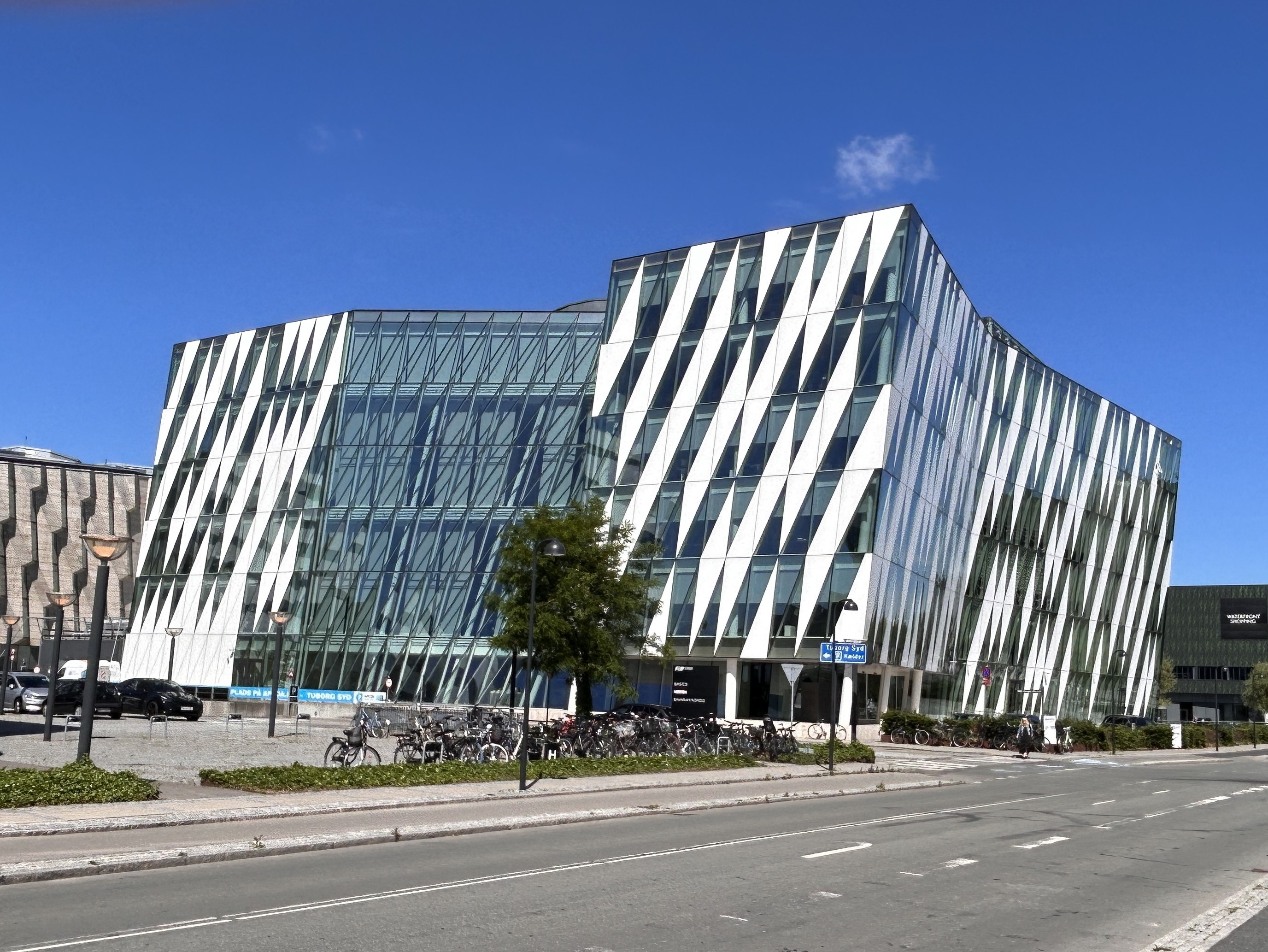
Saxo Bank head office, Copenhagen

The following list of banks in Denmark is to be understood within the framework of the European single market, which means that Denmark's banking system is more open to cross-border banking operations than peers outside of the European Union. It is based on the 2026 categorization of Danish credit institutions based on metrics observed in the third quarter of 2025, as published by Finanstilsynet, the country's bank supervisory authority.

The list below uses the same categories, or groups, and lists credit institutions within each group in the same order as Finanstilsynet. For that, Finanstilsynet relies on a concept of "working capital" defined as the sum of equity, subordinated debt, deposits and other debt, deposits in pooled schemes, bonds issued at fair value, and bonds issued at amortized cost.

== Systemically important banks ==
Finanstilsynet's Group 1 is made of credit institutions designated as systemically important:

- Nykredit Realkredit A/S, mortgage subsidiary of Nykredit
- Danske Bank A/S
- Realkredit Danmark A/S, mortgage subsidiary of Danske Bank
- Nordea Kredit Realkreditaktieselskab, Danish mortgage subsidiary of Nordea
- Jyske Realkredit A/S, mortgage subsidiary of Jyske Bank
- Jyske Bank A/S
- DLR Kredit A/S
- Nykredit Bank A/S
- Sydbank A/S from 8 December 2025 called AL Sydbank after merger with Arbejdernes Landsbank and Vestjysk Bank
- Spar Nord Bank A/S, subsidiary of Nykredit Bank since May 2025
- Saxo Bank A/S
- Totalkredit A/S, another mortgage subsidiary of Nykredit
- Coop Bank A/S, subsidiary of Sydbank since mid-2024

Aside from its above-listed mortgage subsidiary, Nordea operates in Denmark via a branch, categorized in Finanstilsynet's Group 5. Nordea describes itself as a leading bank in Denmark, and was among the country's largest banks before its conversion into a branch in 2016.

== Medium-sized banks ==
Finanstilsynet's Group 2 is made of credit institutions whose working capital exceeds DKK 17.5 billion, but are not systemically important:

- Sparekassen Danmark
- Ringkøbing Landbobank
- Danmarks Skibskredit A/S
- Sparekassen Kronjylland
- Lån & Spar Bank A/S
- SJF Bank
- Middelfart Sparekasse
- Danske Andelskassers Bank A/S

== Smaller banks ==
Finanstilsynet's Group 3 is made of credit institutions with working capital between DKK 2 billion and DKK 17.5 billion:

- Djurslands Bank A/S
- Sparekassen Thy
- Skjern Bank A/S
- Sydjysk Sparekasse
- Lægernes Bank A/S
- Lunar Bank A/S
- Fynske Bank A/S
- Kreditbanken A/S
- Ekspres Bank A/S
- Lollands Bank A/S
- Merkur Andelskasse
- Møns Bank A/S
- Sparekassen Bredebro
- Facit Bank A/S
- Dragsholm Sparekasse
- Sparekassen for Nr. Nebel og Omegn
- Hvidbjerg Bank A/S
- Rise Sparekasse
- Frørup Andelskasse
- kompasbank a/s

== Small banks ==
Finanstilsynet's Group 4 is made of credit institutions with working capital under DKK 2 billion:

- Balling Sparekasse
- Frøslev-Mollerup Sparekasse
- Rønde Sparekasse
- Sønderhå-Hørsted Sparekasse
- Andelskassen Fælleskassen
- Borbjerg Sparekasse
- Faster Andelskasse
- Klim Sparekasse
- Maj Bank A/S
- Stadil Sparekasse

== Foreign branches ==
Finanstilsynet's Group 5 comprises the Danish branches of the following non-Danish banking groups, all established in the European Economic Area:

- (Sweden) Siemens Financial Services AB, subsidiary of Siemens Financial Services (Germany)
- (Sweden) Ikano Bank AB (publ.)
- (Finland) Nordea Bank Abp
- (Sweden) SEB Kort Bank AB, subsidiary of SEB Group
- (Norway) Santander Consumer Bank AS, subsidiary of Santander (Spain)
- (Norway) DNB Bank ASA
- (Sweden) Skandinaviska Enskilda Banken AB (publ.)
- (Sweden) Nordnet Bank AB
- (Sweden) Telia Finance AB, subsidiary of Telia Company
- (Sweden) DNB Carnegie Investment Bank AB (publ.), subsidiary of DNB Bank (Norway)
- (Germany) UBS Europe SE, subsidiary of UBS (Switzerland)
- (Sweden) Resurs Bank AB
- (Republic of Ireland) Citibank Europe plc, subsidiary of Citigroup (United States)
- (France) BNP Paribas SA
- (Sweden) EnterCard Group AB
- (Germany) J.P. Morgan SE, subsidiary of JPMorgan Chase (United States)
- (Sweden) PayEx Sverige AB, subsidiary of Swedbank
- (Germany) Goldman Sachs Bank Europe SE, subsidiary of Goldman Sachs (United States)
- (Luxembourg) Banking Circle SA
- (Luxembourg) Quintet Private Bank (Europe) SA
- (Belgium) The Bank of New York Mellon SA/NV, subsidiary of BNY (United States)
- (Sweden) Klarna Bank AB (publ.)
- (Germany) Morgan Stanley Europe SE, subsidiary of Morgan Stanley (United States)
- (France) Crédit Agricole Corporate and Investment Bank, subsidiary of Crédit Agricole
- (Germany) Trade Republic Bank GmbH

As of October 2025, there were no branches of banks located outside the European Economic Area ("third-country branches") in Denmark, based on data compiled by the European Banking Authority.

== Faroe & Greenland ==
Finanstilsynet's Group 6 is made of banks established in the Faroe Islands and Greenland:

- Føroya Banki
- P/F Betri Banki
- Grønlandsbanken A/S
- Nordoya Sparikassi
- Suduroyar Sparikassi P/F

== Defunct banks ==
- Kurantbanken (1736-1773)
- Marstal Savings Bank (1822-1974)
- Provinsbanken (1846-1990)
- Kjøbenhavns private Laanebank (1854-1922)
- Arbejdernes Byggeforening (1865-1972)
- Roskilde Bank (1884-2008)
- Arbejdernes Landsbank (1919-2025)
- FIH Erhvervsbank (1958-2016)
- Finansbanken (1979-2010)
- DnB NORD (2006-2011)

== See also ==
- List of banks in Europe
- List of banks in the euro area
