= Finansbanken =

Bank in Denmark

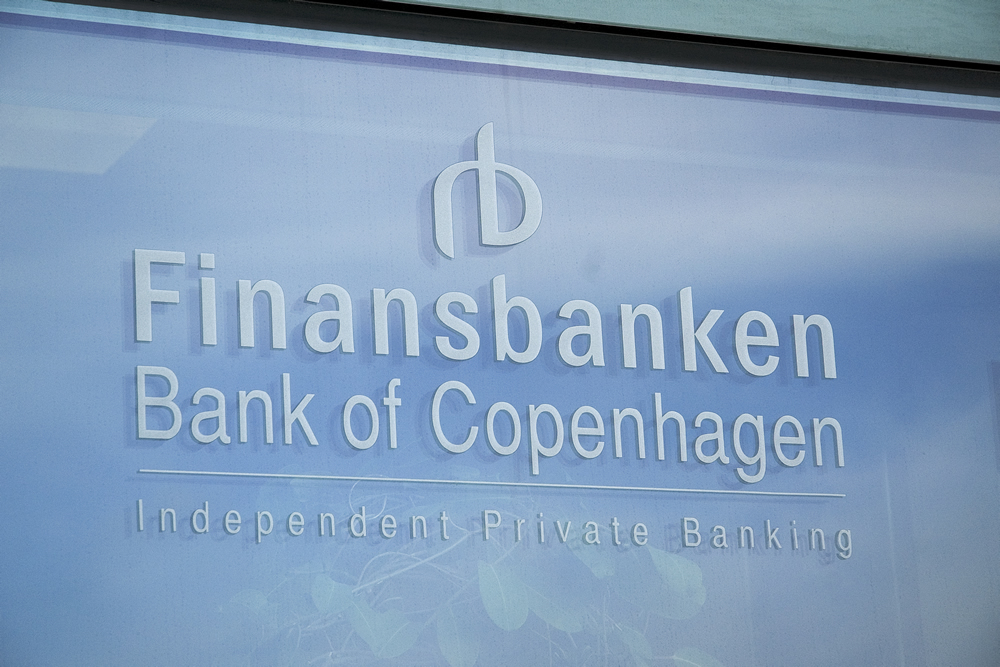
Finansbanken, Bank of Copenhagen

Finansbanken was a Danish bank that was founded on September 27, 1979, with the name "Den Københavnske Bank" (Bank of Copenhagen). The bank's name was later changed to "Finansbanken". It was later sold to Sparekassen Lolland and operates as a subsidiary. It is headquartered in Copenhagen, Denmark.

The bank's main area of competence is private banking, with customers worldwide in more than 85 countries.

In May 2007, the bank was sold to Eik Bank Danmark, which was part of the Faroese Eik Group and changed its name to Eik Bank Danmark. On September 30, 2010, Eik Bank Danmark was transferred to Finansiel Stabilitet because it could not meet the statutory solvency requirements. Sparekassen Lolland bought the shares from Finansiel Stabilitet on February 28, 2011. Eik Bank Danmark continues in Spar Lolland under the name Finansbanken as an independent business unit with continued focus on internet-based banking services.

== See also ==
- List of banks in Denmark
