= Danske Bank Lithuania =

Danske Bank
- Formerly: Lithuanian Development Bank (1994-2001); SAMPO Bankas (2001-2008); Danske Bankas (2008-2012)
- Company type: Subsidiary
- Industry: Banking
- Founded: December 14, 1994; 31 years ago
- Headquarters: Lithuania
- Parent: Danske Bank
- Website: danskebank.lt

Danske Bank Lithuania (previously known as Danske Bankas) is a Lithuanian bank and a subsidiary of Danish Danske Bank. Danske Bank Group is one of the largest financial service groups in Northern Europe and the Baltic States. The bank operated under the brand name Danske Bankas, UAB Danske Capital Investicijų Valdymas and UAB Danske Lizingas.

Danske Bank offers all types of banking services, including investment service, debt, savings for both private and business customers. As of 2022, Danske Bankas was the 5th largest bank in the Lithuanian banking industry.

== History ==
The bank was established in 1994 as the Lithuanian Development Bank and gained its commercial banking license on the 15 September 2000. Later that year on December 28, the Finnish financial service group Sampo Group acquired the bank and renamed it Sampo Bankas. A new Board was formed that same year. In December 2004 the legal status of the bank was changed from closed joint stock company (in Lithuanian—UAB) to joint stock company (in Lithuanian—AB).

In November 2006 the bank was acquired by Danske Bank when Danske Bank bought SAMPO Plc for 30.1 billion Danish kroner. The profit SAMPO Plc gained after this transaction was 2,9 billion euros. In 2007 Danske Bank Group started to run retail banks in Finland, Lithuania, Latvia, Estonia and Russia. In Lithuania, SAMPO Bankas was renamed to Danske Bankas in June 2008. In November 2012 Danske Bankas changed its name to Danske Bank in order to operate under the same name as the rest of the Danske Bank group.
