= Aivar Rehe =

Estonian banker and civil servant

Aivar Rehe (3 April 1963 Kohtla-Järve – 2019) was an Estonian banker and civil servant.

In 1985, he graduated from Tallinn Polytechnical Institute.

2004–2006, he was the principal head of Tax and Customs Board. 2008–2015, he was the head of Danske Bank's Estonia branch.

In 2017, he was related to Danske Bank money laundering scandal.

In 2007, he was awarded with Order of the White Star, III class.
