= Nordnet =

Nordic financial services company

Nordnet AB (publ)
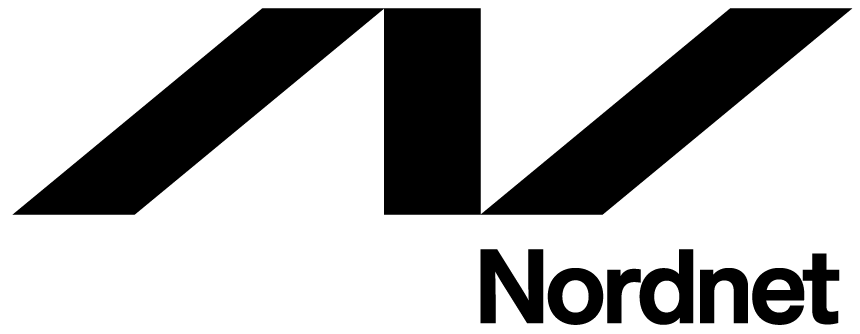
- Company type: Public Aktiebolag
- Traded as: Nasdaq Stockholm: SAVE
- ISIN: SE0015192067
- Industry: Financial services
- Founded: 1996; 30 years ago in Stockholm, Sweden
- Headquarters: Stockholm, Sweden
- Areas served: Sweden; Denmark; Finland; Norway
- Key people: Rasmus Järborg (CEO); Tom Dinkelspiel (chairman)
- Services: Stockbroker; Electronic trading platform; Loans; Pension funds
- Revenue: ▲SEK 3.63 billion (2021)
- Operating income: ▲SEK 2,45 billion (2021)
- Total assets: SEK 232.54 billion (2021)
- Owners: Öhman Group (21.6%); Premiefinans (10.1%); Norges Bank (5.2%); Fidelity Investments (4.9%)
- Number of employees: 798 (2021)
- Website: nordnetab.com

Nordnet AB (publ), commonly shortened to Nordnet, is a pan-Nordic financial services company, headquartered in Stockholm, Sweden. Nordnet was founded in 1996, becoming the first Internet broker in Sweden, and has expanded since to provide other saving and investment services. The company is divided into three business areas, Savings and investments, Loans, and Pensions.

Besides Sweden where the headquarters are located, Nordnet provides services to customers in Denmark, Finland, and Norway, with local offices present in Copenhagen, Helsinki, and Oslo respectively. In April 2020, Nordnet has reached a milestone of 1,000,000 customers.

In 2017, Nordnet became the first Swedish bank to offer direct deposits via Swish. Other examples of launches from the period 2017-2018 are brokerage-free trading in exchange-traded products, expanded offer in mortgages, new mobile application, share loan program and digital advisory services.

Nordnet was originally founded as an online brokerage subsidiary of the Öhman financial group. For the first time, Nordnet was traded on the Nasdaq Stockholm between April 2000 and February 2017, when it was privatized by the Öhman group and Nordic Capital. In November 2020, Nordnet was relisted on the Nasdaq Stockholm, with the Öhman group remaining the largest shareholder with 21.64% of total shares.

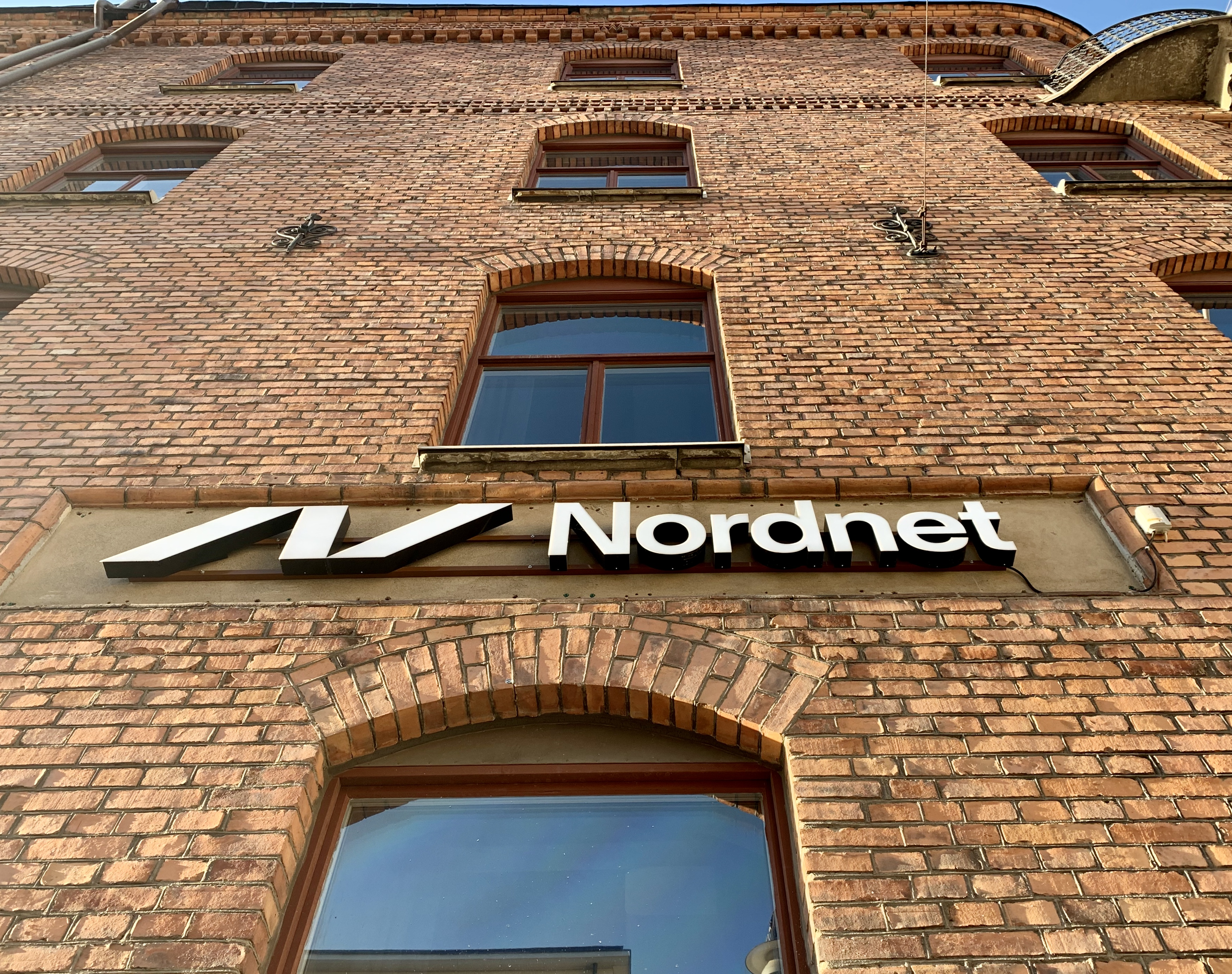
Headquarters in Kungsholmen, Stockholm

== See also ==
- List of banks in Sweden
- List of banks in Denmark
- List of banks in Finland
- List of banks in Norway
- List of electronic trading platforms
