= Michael Strabo =

Danish financier (born 1975)

- Born: November 6, 1975 (age 50); Helsingør, Denmark
- Education: University College London
- Occupation: Financier
- Organization: Strabo Investments Limited

Michael Strabo (born November 6, 1975) is a Danish financier. He is the founder and managing director of Strabo Investments Limited, a Malta incorporated capital markets and corporate finance focused firm.

He has publicly advocated for companies to implement shareholder value enhancing strategies, actively pushing Danske Bank A/S to implement a share buyback program and arguing the Danske Bank Board of Directors ought to consider a sale of the company in order to unlock shareholder value.

== Early life and education ==
Strabo was born in Denmark in 1975 and graduated from University College London (UCL) with a B.Sc. joint honours degree in both mathematics and statistics. He holds the Chartered Financial Analyst (CFA) designation from the CFA Institute.
