= DnB NORD =

Danish bank

DNB A/S
- Company type: Joint venture
- Industry: Banking
- Founded: 2006
- Headquarters: Copenhagen, Denmark
- Key people: Rune Bjerke (CEO)
- Revenue: € 44.1 million (2005)
- Operating income: € 14.1 million (2005)
- Net income: € 13.4 million (2005)
- Number of employees: 3,400 (end 2008)
- Parent: DNB
- Website: https://www.dnb.no

DnB NORD A/S was a joint venture between DNB Bank and NORD/LB. The Bank’s head office was located in Copenhagen, while the Bank has operations in Estonia, Latvia, Lithuania. The latter three operate as subsidiaries of the bank. Bank DnB NORD Group has approx. 3,100 employees, 930,000 customers and a consolidated balance sheet of approx. EUR 10.0 billion.

== DNB Banka ==
DNB Banka is one of Latvia's leading universal banks in terms of assets, deposits and loan portfolio size, providing its customers - both private individuals and legal entities - with competitive financial products and services and a high level of service through its extensive branch network. The shareholder of DNB Banka is DNB - the leading financial group in Norway and a significant participant in the Scandinavian financial market. The Norwegian government holds 34% of DnB NOR shares. DNB is a market leader in the area of loans and deposits, funding, asset management, life insurance and pension funds, payments and financial services, real estate transactions as well as all services related the capital market of Norway.

== Shareholders ==
50% of the bank shares are owned by DNB Bank ASA. About 34% of the shares are owned by the Norwegian government.

== Involvement in spam transactions ==
In early 2011 a team from the University of California-San Diego, the University of California-Berkeley, and the Budapest University of Technology and Economics investigated spam emails by test transactions. DnB NORD was observed to be third of three banks that provide payment services for 95% of all the spam purchases.

Later that May, DnB NORD indicated that they bought a bank which had customers engaging in spam activities and had terminated their relationship with the customer.

== See also ==
- List of banks in Denmark
