= Danske Bank money laundering scandal =

2017–2018 money laundering scandal

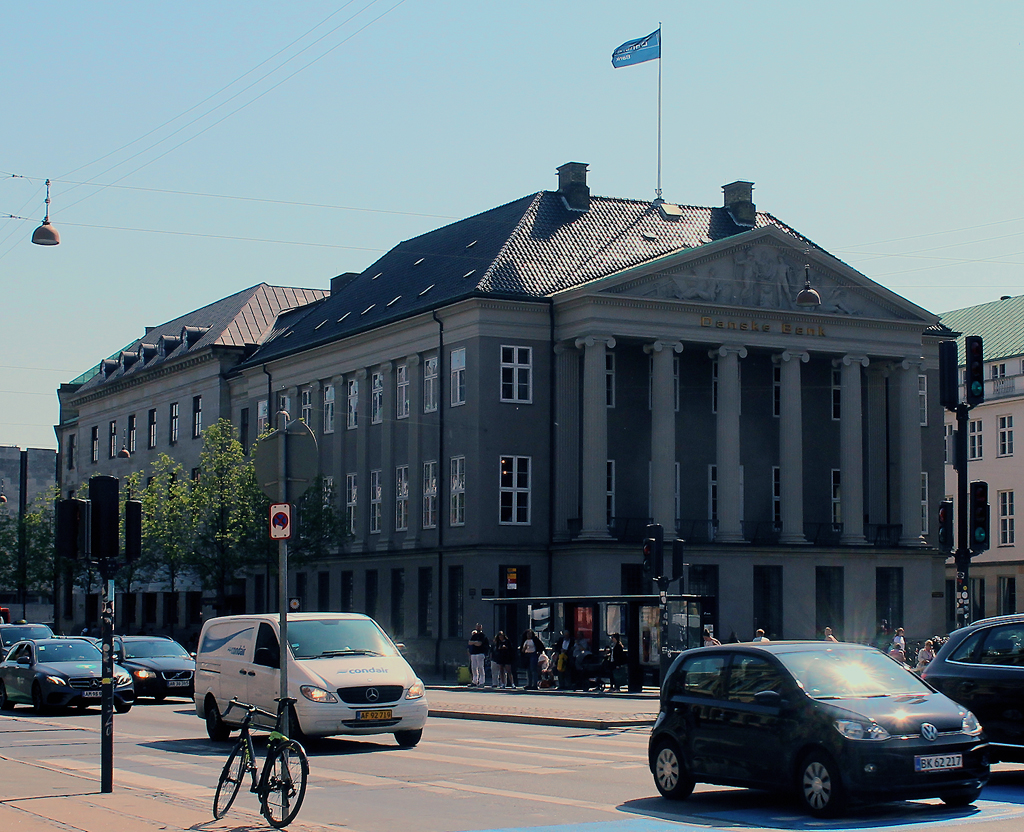
The headquarters of Danske Bank in Copenhagen

The Danske Bank money laundering scandal arose in 2017–2018, when it became known that around €200 billion of suspicious transactions had flowed from Estonian, Russian, Latvian and other sources through the Denmark-based Danske Bank's only branch in Estonia from 2007 to 2015. It has been described as possibly the largest ever money laundering scandal in Europe, and possibly the largest in world history. It includes incoming funds from Estonia (23%), Russia (23%), Latvia (12%), Cyprus (9%), the UK (4%) and others (30%, more than 150 countries each of which account for a smaller part than the UK). Outgoing funds were distributed between Estonia (15%), Latvia (14%), China (7%), Switzerland (6%), Turkey (6%) and others (52%)

== Financial supervision ==
Danske Bank, headquartered in Copenhagen, is the largest bank in Denmark. The bank's local branch in Estonia, which was acquired by Danske Bank as part of a merger with Finnish Sampo Bank in 2007, was used for the activities. It was under the jurisdiction of both the Financial Supervisory Authority of Denmark (due to the location of the headquarters) and the Financial Supervisory Authority of Estonia (due to the location of the branch), and both have blamed the other side for deficiencies. The Danish and the Estonian supervisory authorities later released a joint press release on collaborating and sharing information on the case. Both were allegedly criticized in a draft prepared by the European Banking Authority, an EU banking watchdog controlled by the national financial supervisory authorities of EU member states. However, the EBA closed its investigation early and did not publish the findings – a decision that itself caused criticism.

== Events ==
In 2012, the Estonian Financial Supervision Authority published a critical report on the Danske Bank's activities. One of Russian whistleblower Sergei Magnitsky's stolen Hermitage Capital Management subsidiaries, Diron Trade LLP which had a Great Britain postal box, assisted in $5.8 billion in money laundering transfers between Swedbank's Baltic subsidiaries and Danske Bank during 6 months in 2010 and 2011 according to SVT. During that time, Aivars Bergers, a board member of Latvia's leading pro-Russian party Harmony and one of its largest financiers, received EUR 270,000 from Diron Trade LLP and Murova Systems LLP, a company which has a Great Britain postal box and is associated with the Azerbaijani Laundromat in which $2.9 billion was money laundered through Danske Bank's Estonia branch. In 2013, the first whistleblower disclosed that Danske's branch in Tallinn was knowingly dealing with funds from the family of Russian President Vladimir Putin (his cousin Igor Putin) and the Russian Security Service (FSB). The claims were not properly looked into and hence did not catch enough attention. The local Estonian branch of Danske Bank, after being acquired in 2007, still used its own IT system and many documents were written in Estonian or Russian. Despite these differences in systems and language, the Danske Bank did not implement changes that would make it easier to control the headquarters in Denmark. In a 2018 report released by Bruun&Hjejle, a law firm retained by Danske Bank, the bank claimed to have believed for a "long time" that the high risks represented by non-resident customers were mitigated by proper Anti-Money-Laundering procedures. It had become clear that the AML procedures were not sufficient after being tipped off by an internal whistleblower. The whistleblower was later identified as Howard Wilkinson, former head of trading for Danske Bank in Estonia, Latvia & Lithuania.

According to the Danish FSA, non-resident portfolios from Russia in 2012 made up 35% of the profits of the local branch. The overall percentage of Russian clients in the branch was 8%. Some of these transactions have been linked to the Russian Government and were done via shell companies that were registered in the United Kingdom, Cyprus and New Zealand, as well as other banks in Latvia and Moldova. The second highest amount of non-resident portfolios were from the United Kingdom. Another significant non-resident portfolio has been linked to the President of Azerbaijan and his family.

In 2013, US bank JPMorgan Chase halted its services to the Estonian branch of the bank, suspecting it was laundering large amounts of Russian money. Other banks continued providing services into 2015.

In 2014, The Estonian Financial Supervision Authority found "large-scale, long-lasting systemic violations of anti-money laundering rules" in the Estonian branch of Danske Bank and notified the Danish authorities of the findings. According to the Estonian Financial Supervision Authority, the activities decreased after they requested the bank to target the violations.

According to the Danish FSA, a critical report sent by the Estonian FSA was discussed at the bank's board meeting on October 7, 2014. The conclusions of the report were "toned down" in the minuted discussions of the Executive Board. According to the report, during a meeting in June 2014, the bank's board members "were interested in the branch’s earnings, while the minutes have not recorded any comments on the significant AML challenges."

A former executive of the Estonian branch of Danske Bank was found dead on September 25, 2019. Estonian police discovered the body of Aivar Rehe, who was in charge of the branch from 2007 until 2015, during a search operation after his disappearance that began two days earlier. Rehe was a key witness in the ongoing criminal investigation. The cause of his death has been reported as suicide.

== Results ==
Ten former employees in the local branch of the bank were arrested by Estonian authorities in December 2018, and the bank was required by the Estonian government to close its Estonian branch in 2019.

The CEO Thomas Borgen resigned in 2018 following the scandal. Danish authorities charged him in May 2019 with neglecting his responsibilities. At the same time, Danish prosecutors charged Henrik Ramlau-Hansen, the bank's former finance director, with failing to prevent the suspicious transactions. The Danish Parliament increased penalties for money laundering eight-fold, making them some of the toughest in Europe.

All charges against Danske bankers (Thomas Borgen, Henrik Ramlau-Hansen, and Lars Morch) were dropped in April 2021. Thomas Borgen was also acquitted in a civil lawsuit related to the Danske money laundering scandal in November 2022.

The value of Danske Bank shares was halved in 2018. The bank has said it will donate 1.5 billion kroner (c. US$225 million) to a charity. It expects to pay fines of several billion dollars to financial regulators in Denmark, the U.S. and other European countries.

In December 2022, Danske Bank pled guilty and agreed to a $2 billion fine in a case from the United States Department of Justice.

In February 2024 a Danish court sentenced two facilitators in the crime: Danish-Russian woman Irene Ellert was given nine years in prison for money laundering of DKK 26 billion, with DKK 2.6 million confiscated from her personally; Lithuanian Arunas Macenas was sentenced to seven years in prison for complicity in laundering DKK 29 billion.

== See also ==
- 2014 Moldovan bank fraud scandal
- Azerbaijani Laundromat
- FinCEN Files
- Russian Laundromat
