= Provinsbanken =

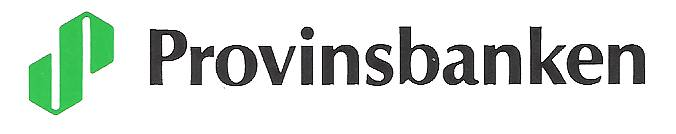
- Logo of Provinsbaken
- Industry: Banking
- Founded: 1846; 180 years ago
- Defunct: 1990
- Successor: Danske Bank
- Area served: Denmark

Provinsbanken was Denmark's fifth-largest bank in 1990 when it merged with Danske Bank and Handelsbanken (not affiliated with the Swedish Handelsbanken). Provinsbanken dates back to 1846, when Fyens Disconto Kasse was established by a group of Odense merchants under the leadership of Lorentz Bierfreund. It was the country's first private bank.

== See also ==
- List of banks in Denmark
