= Dansk Landbrugs Realkreditfond =

Danish bank

- Native name: DLR Kredit A/S
- Industry: Financial services
- Founded: 1960
- Headquarters: Nyropsgade 21, Copenhagen, Denmark
- Website: www.dlr.dk

Dansk Landbrugs Realkreditfond or Danish Agricultural Mortgage Bank was founded in 1960 to provide mortgage loans for agricultural properties (agriculture, horticulture, etc.). Lending was based on the issuance of bonds, and the bonds were recorded daily on the Copenhagen Stock Exchange.

== SIFI status ==
On 27 June 2016 was confirmed DLR’s status as SIFI (Systemically Important Financial Institution), received on 24 June 2014, because one of the SIFI indicators - the institute's balance sheet in percentage of GDP - was exceeded.

== See also ==
- List of banks in Denmark
