= Sydbank =

Danish bank

AL Sydbank A/S
- Company type: Publicly traded Aktieselskab
- Traded as: Nasdaq Copenhagen: SYDB
- Industry: Financial services
- Founded: 1970
- Headquarters: Aabenraa, Denmark
- Key people: Karen Frøsig (CEO); Lars Mikkelgaard-Jensen (Chairman)
- Products: Retail, commercial and private banking
- Revenue: DKK 4.594 billion (2010)
- Net income: DKK 411 million (2010)
- Total assets: DKK 150.84 billion (end 2010)
- Total equity: DKK 9.554 billion (end 2010)
- Number of employees: 2,280 (FTE, end 2010)
- Website: www.sydbank.com

AL Sydbank A/S is one of Denmark's largest full service banks headquartered in Aabenraa. Sydbank was founded in 1970 with the merger of four local banks based in Southern Jutland: Den Nordslesvigske Folkebank (Aabenraa); Graasten Bank (Gråsten); Folkebanken for Als og Sundeved (Sønderborg) and Tønder Landmandsbank (Tønder). It has since then grown considerably through mergers and acquisitions, one of the latest being DiskontoBanken (DiBa Bank) of Næstved, which was delisted on the Copenhagen stock exchange as of 15 January 2014. It has 57 branches including three in Germany. After a merger in December 2025 it is called AL Sydbank. The new merged bank has around 140 branches.

== History ==
=== 1970s ===
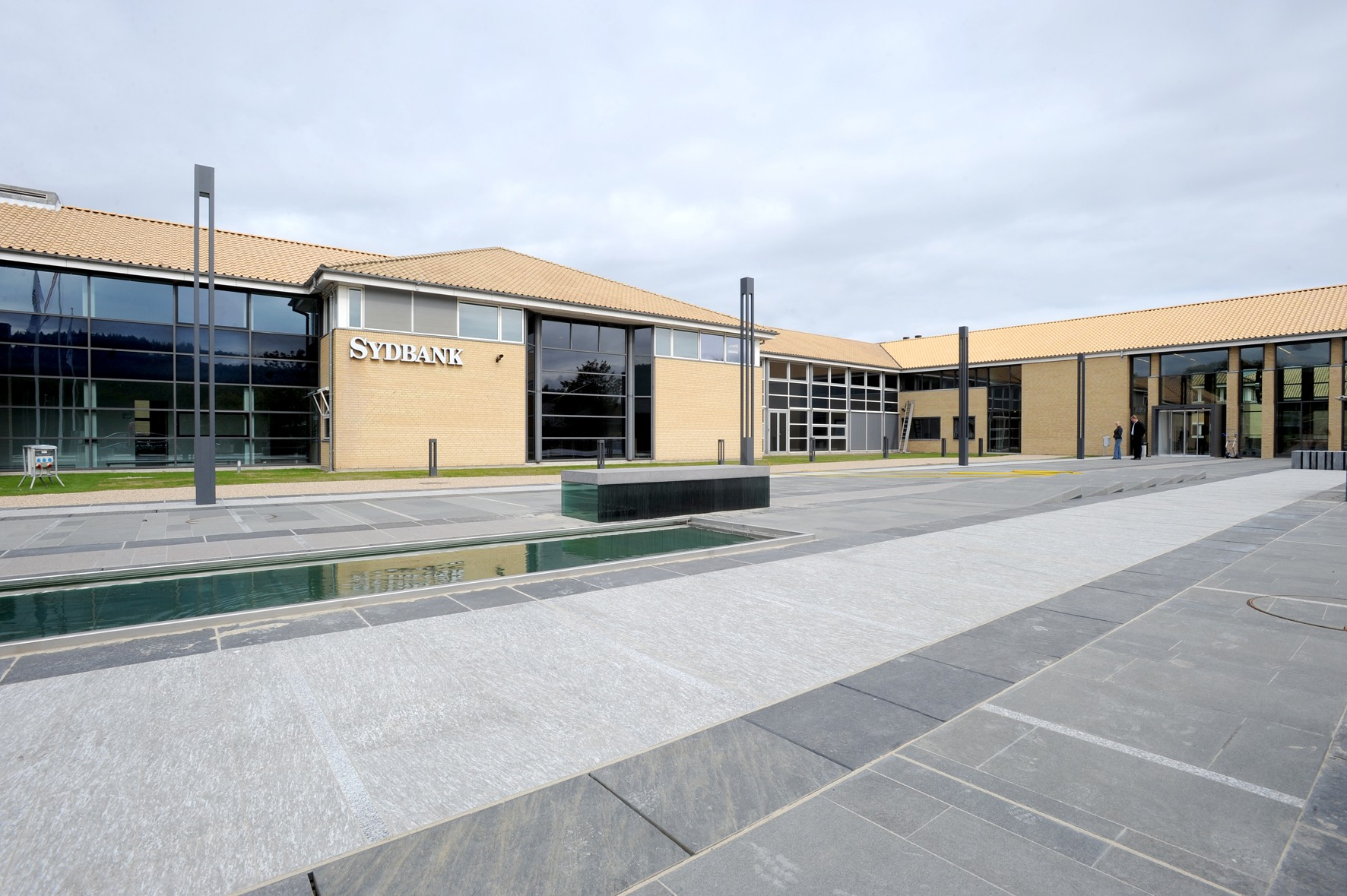
Sydbank's head office

Through the early 1970s, Sydbank had only 50 branches — all in south Jutland — until 1976 when it opened its first branch across the Kongeå River in Fredericia.

=== 1980s ===
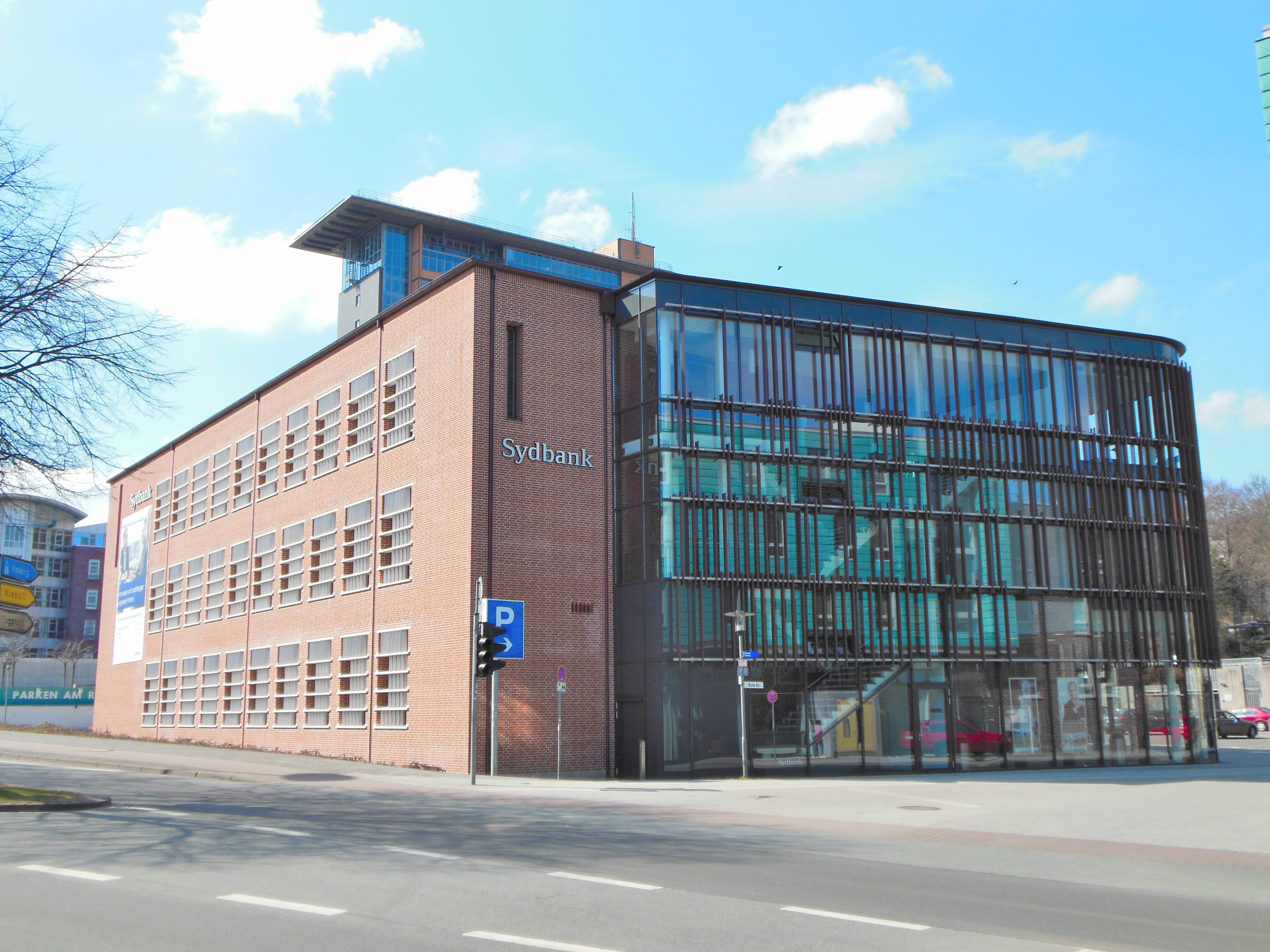
Sydbank's branch in Flensburg, Germany

In 1980, Sydbank grew greatly. In 1983, Sydbank opened an office at Kongens Nytorv in Copenhagen and merged with the Aarhus Bank. In 1984, it engaged in another merger with Fuen Bank and Co-established bank with a branch in Flensburg and subsidiary SBK-Finance. In 1985, came a branch in Hamburg. In 1987, the company created Sydbank Investment branch Sydinvest and purchased parts of Copenhagen-based 6th July Bank, which had gone into receivership in March of that year. In 1988, it purchased Sydbank Community Bank branches in Copenhagen and the following year, bought Sydbank DMK-Holding. The bank ended the decade with a market share of just two percent, 70 branches and 1,400 employees.

=== 1990s ===
Sydbank merged in 1990 with Sparekassen South Jutland. It acquired Varde Bank in early 1994, including 30 West Jutland branches. In May 1994, it bought Sydbank Active Bank and 40 East Jutland offices from Topdanmark.

=== 2000s ===
Since 2000, Sydbank has offices in almost all parts of Denmark. Sydbank acquired Odense Bank Egnsbank Funen in 2002 and began to open branches in central Jutland and Sealand. It opened the subsidiary Sydbank (Schweiz) AG in St. Gallen, Switzerland in 2002. In 2007, it sold Sydbank DMK-Holding to Ebh Bank and opened offices in Kiel. In 2008, the company purchased Trelleborg Bank, headquartered in Slagelse.

=== 2010s ===
Sydbank is now one of Denmark's largest full-service banks based in Southern Jutland and headquartered in Aabenraa. The Bank has a market share in the sector around seven percent, approximately 2,600 employees and 115 branches - including three in Germany. The executive director since 2010 is Karen Frøsig.

On 17 September 2019, half of Sydbank's board members (excl. employee-elected members) resigned in protest over Sydbank's strategy and governance. Several media report that the resignations follow failed attempts to merge Sydbank to improve profitability and falling stock.

=== 2020s ===
In October 2020, the bank acquired Alm. Brand Bank from Alm. Brand for €250 million.

In May 2024 it was announced that the bank would buy Coop Bank with 88,000 customers from the retailer Coop amba.

In October 2025, it was announced that the bank would merge with Arbejdernes Landsbank and Vestjysk Bank with the name continuing as AL Sydbank. In December 2025, it was announced the Danish Financial Supervisory Authority (FSA) had granted its final regulatory approval for the acquisition of Arbejdernes Landsbank and Vestjysk Bank.

== SydbankFonden ==
Sydbank founded SydbankFonden in 2002 which annually awards millions to charitable, cultural and popular applications. Among others, SydbankFonden funded the bronze sculpture "Myth" in 2008 which was awarded to Sønderborg - inspired by King Christian II, who, according to the legend, created a groove in a stone board during captivity in Sønderborg Castle.

== See also ==
- List of banks in Denmark
