= Spar Nord =

Bank based in North Jutland, Denmark

Spar Nord Bank A/S
- Formerly: Bye og Omegns Sparekasse; Sparekassen Nordjylland
- Company type: Aktieselskab
- ISIN: DK0060036564
- Industry: Banking
- Founded: May 12, 1824; 201 years ago in Aalborg
- Headquarters: North Jutland, Denmark
- Total assets: DKK 144 billion (March 2025)
- Website: www.sparnord.dk

Spar Nord Bank A/S (Nasdaq Copenhagen: SPNO) is a bank based in North Jutland, Denmark.

The history of the bank can be traced back to May 12, 1824, where "Bye og Omegns Sparekasse" (The Savings Bank for Town and County) was established in Aalborg. After a number of mergers through the 20th century, the name was changed from "Sparekassen Nordjylland" (The Savings Bank of Northern Jutland) to its current short form.

In the 2010s Spar Nord has opened several offices in larger towns outside Northern Jutland in Denmark. As of 2019, it is Denmark’s sixth largest bank.

In December 2024, domestic rival Danish lender Nykredit announced its intention to acquire Spar Nord for DKK 24.7 billion, and Spar Nord's board of directors stated that it supported the bid. The takeover would create the third largest banking group in Denmark, with a 13% share of the market. By March 2025, Nykredit's take in Spar Nord reached more than 80% and, after a compulsory acquisition of the remaining Spar Nord Bank shares, Nykredit delisted Spar Nord Bank from Nasdaq Copenhagen.

== See also ==
- List of banks in Denmark
