= Nykredit =

Danish financial service company

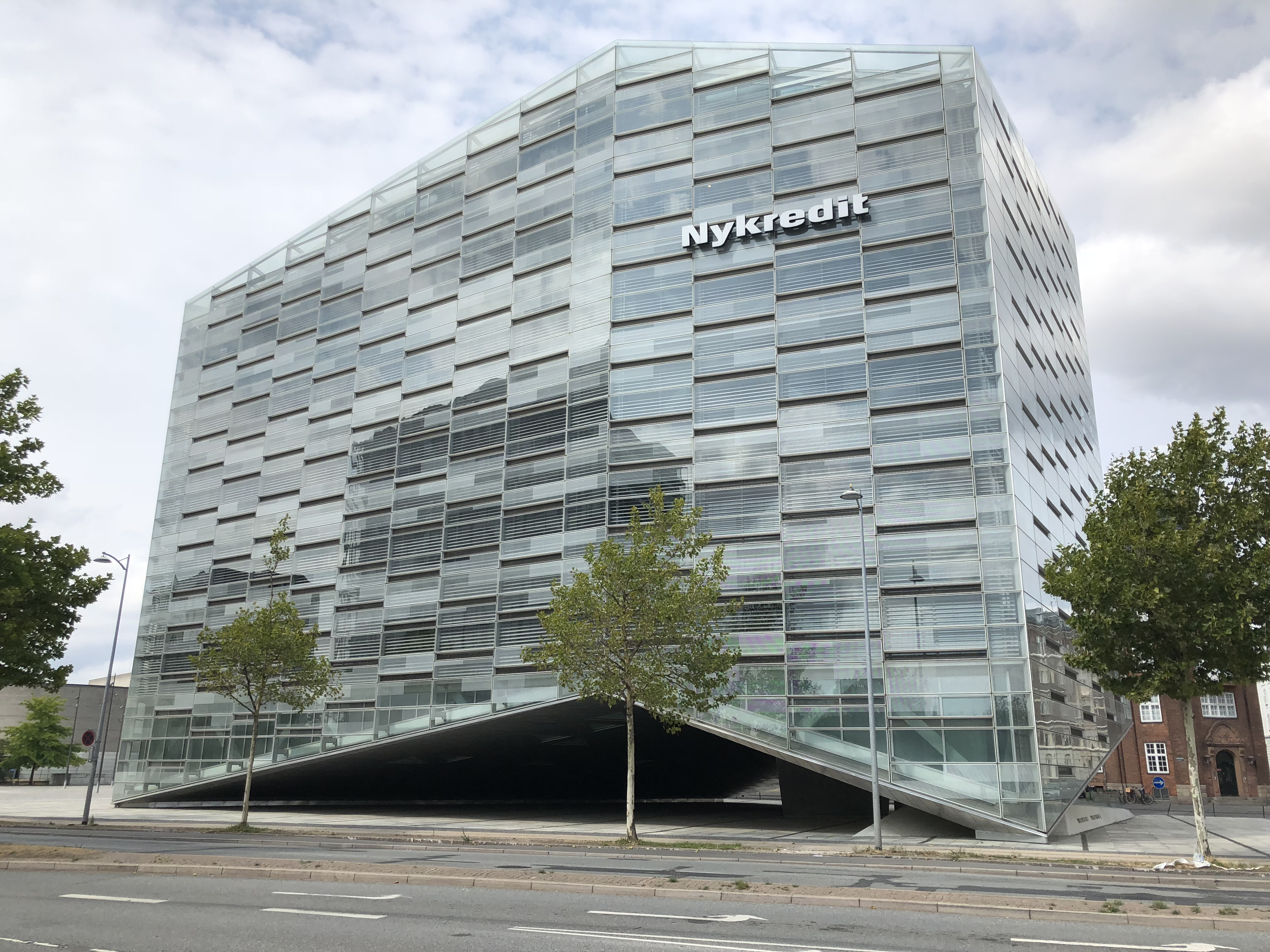
- Nykredit headquarters The Crystal
- Company type: Private
- Industry: Financial services
- Founded: 1985; 41 years ago
- Headquarters: Copenhagen, Denmark
- Key people: Michael Rasmussen, CEO
- Products: Banking, mortgages, pension
- Net income: DKK 8.76 billion (2019)
- AUM: DKK 499 billion
- Total equity: DKK 84.36 billion (2019)
- Number of employees: 4,076 (2022)
- Website: www.nykredit.com

Nykredit (lit. 'New Credit') is a Danish financial service company. Its activities range from mortgages, retail and investment banking to insurance, leasing and asset management.

As of 2012, Nykredit Group was the largest lender in Denmark and one of the major private bond issuers in Europe.

== History ==
From 1851 onwards, a large number of credit unions were established in Denmark, of which 16 merged after the mortgage reform in 1970 to become Forenede Kreditforeninger and Jyllands Kreditforeninger respectively in 1972.

in 1985, Nykredit was formed by a merger between Forenede Kreditforeninger and Jyllands Kreditforening.

In 2003 Nykredit bought Totalkredit, a mortgage lending institution whose products are distributed by 103 regional and local banks. In 2008 Nykredit bought Forstædernes Bank and merged it with Nykredit Bank.

In December 2024, Nykredit announced its intention to acquire domestic rival Spar Nord for DKK 24.7 billion, and Spar Nord's board of directors stated that it supported the bid. The takeover would create the third largest banking group in Denmark, with a 13% share of the market.

== Subsidiaries ==
Nykredit has the following wholly owned subsidiaries:

- Totalkredit A/S
- Nykredit Bank A/S
- Nykredit Mægler A/S
- Nykredit Ejendomme A/S

== Legal cases ==
- Nykredit Mortgage Bank Plc v Edward Erdman Group Ltd (No 2) (1998) settled the law in England and Wales regarding the proper measure of loss in a "no transaction" negligent overvaluation case, i.e. where, if a valuation had been correct and not overvalued a property, the relevant property transaction would not have gone ahead. The House of Lords held that the correct measure is the difference between the amount of money lent by the lender, plus interest at a proper rate, and the value of the rights acquired by the lender, namely the borrower's covenant and the true value of the overvalued property.
- In 2014 Nykredit lost a principal case at the Danish Supreme Court regarding service fees.
- In February 2016, Nykredit faced public outrage among their customers due to significantly increased service fees. On 9 September 2016 the Danish Consumer-ombudsman filed a police report regarding misleading marketing of service fees conducted by the subsidiary company Totalkredit.

== See also ==
- Nykredit Architecture Prize
- List of banks in Denmark
- List of European cooperative banks
