= FIH Erhvervsbank A/S =

Danish bank

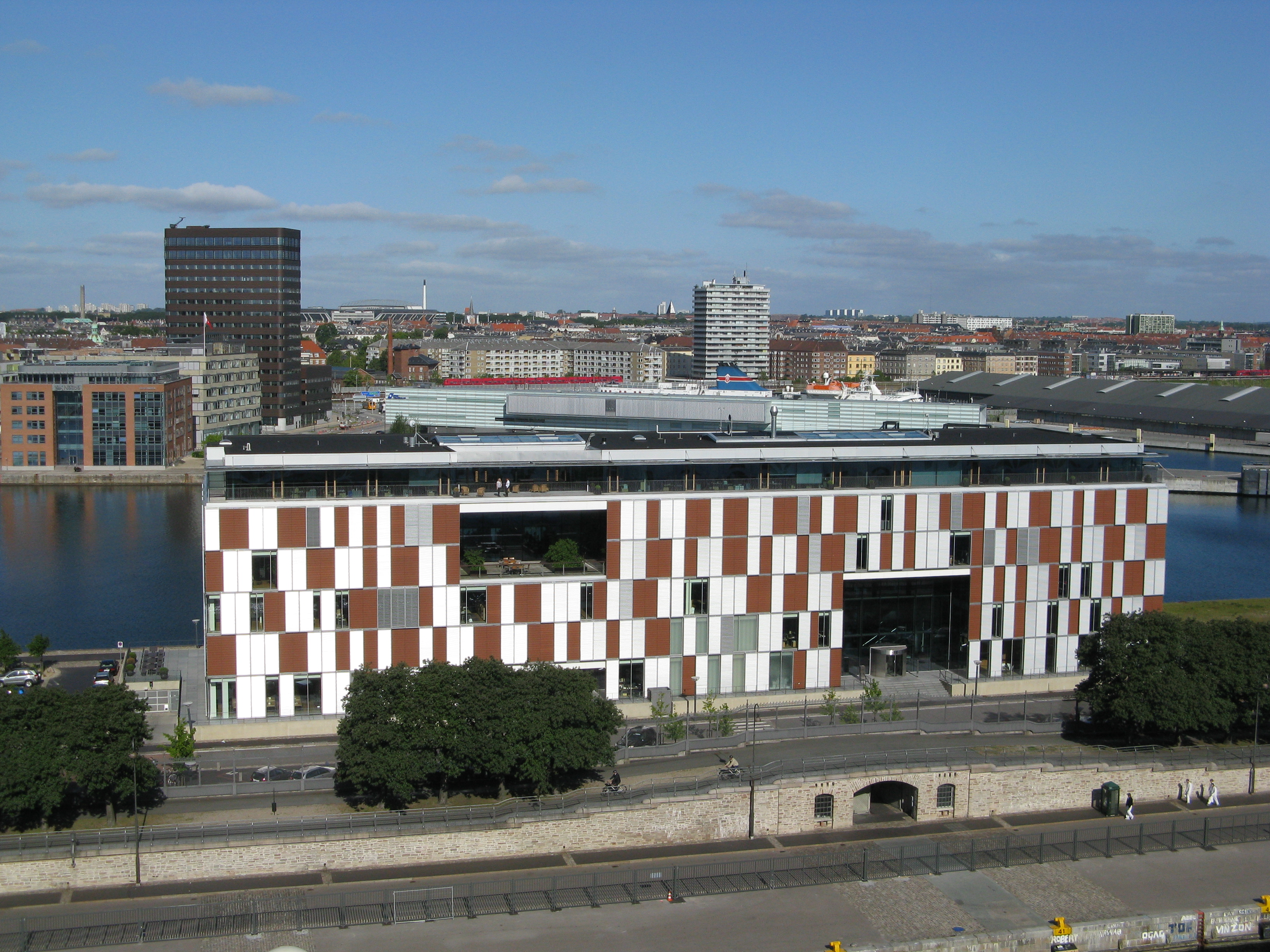
FIH building in Langelinie, Copenhagen

FIH Erhvervsbank A/S (hereafter FIH) was a Danish bank, at one point the sixth-largest bank in Denmark in terms of total assets. FIH was an integrated corporate and investment bank, offering selected services within capital and advisory services to Danish corporates and operates internationally under the name “Finance for Danish Industry”. FIH was headquartered in Copenhagen and operated from four local offices in Jutland (Aalborg, Århus, Herning, and Fredericia). Year-end 2010, FIH had a total lending of approximately DKK [60] billion (approx. EUR [8] billion) spread on roughly 4.000 corporate clients.

FIH was owned by a consortium mainly composed of Scandinavian pension funds, with Danish pension funds ATP and PFA ultimately holding 49.95% and 19.98%, respectively and the remainder being held by Swedish insurance company Folksam (19.98%) and independent financial advisory firm C.P.Dyvig & Co (9.99%)

== History ==
FIH was founded in 1958 by initiative from the Danish Government to provide medium and long term capital for the Danish industry. In the beginning, FIH was owned by the Danish Central Bank, selected domestic banks, insurance companies, and the Confederation of Danish Industries.

In 1988, FIH was listed on the Copenhagen stock exchange and in 1989, FIH was assigned its first credit rating by Moody's Investors Service. In 1999, FI Holding A/S purchased FIH. FI Holding was established at this point – with the majority shareholder Swedbank owning 60 per cent of shares.

In June 2004, Kaupthing Bank hf Iceland bought 100 per cent of the shares in FI Holding A/S for a net price of EUR 950 million and on September 29, 2004, the acquisition of FIH was approved by the Icelandic and Danish Financial Supervisory Authorities. During the period of the Icelandic ownership, FIH made a strategic expansion from its traditional corporate lending business into investment banking activities and to this end established two new business units: Capital Markets and Corporate Finance. Furthermore, in 2008, FIH established NETBANK PRO, a Web-based retail savings platform.

As a result of Kaupthing going into receivership in October 2008, the FIH shares owned by Kaupthing FIH were pledged as collateral with the Icelandic central bank. Being ringfenced from Kaupthing by Danish regulation, FIH continued to operate as a Danish stand-alone bank. Since October 2008, the Icelandic owners had been attempting to sell FIH, which materialised on September 19, 2010 when the consortium composed of ATP, PFA, Folksam and CPDyvig announced that it had agreed to purchase FIH. Completion of the acquisition took place on January 6, 2011.

== Managing directors ==
- 1958-1981 Erik Mollerup
- 1981-1992 Olav Grue
- 1992-1998 Henrik Heideby
- 1998-2009 Lars Johansen
- 2009-2011 Henrik Sjøgren
- 2011-2014 Henrik Sjøgreen (Co-CEO), Bjarne Graven Larsen (Co-CEO)
- 2014- Henrik Sjøgreen

== Brief facts ==
- Net Profit, 2010: DKK 524,6 million
- Employees (FTEs per 30 December 2010): 356,24
- Total Assets (2010): DKK 109,338 million
- Moody's Rating (per 7. oktober 2011): E+ (financial strength)

== See also ==
- List of banks in Denmark
