= Arbejdernes Landsbank =

Danish bank

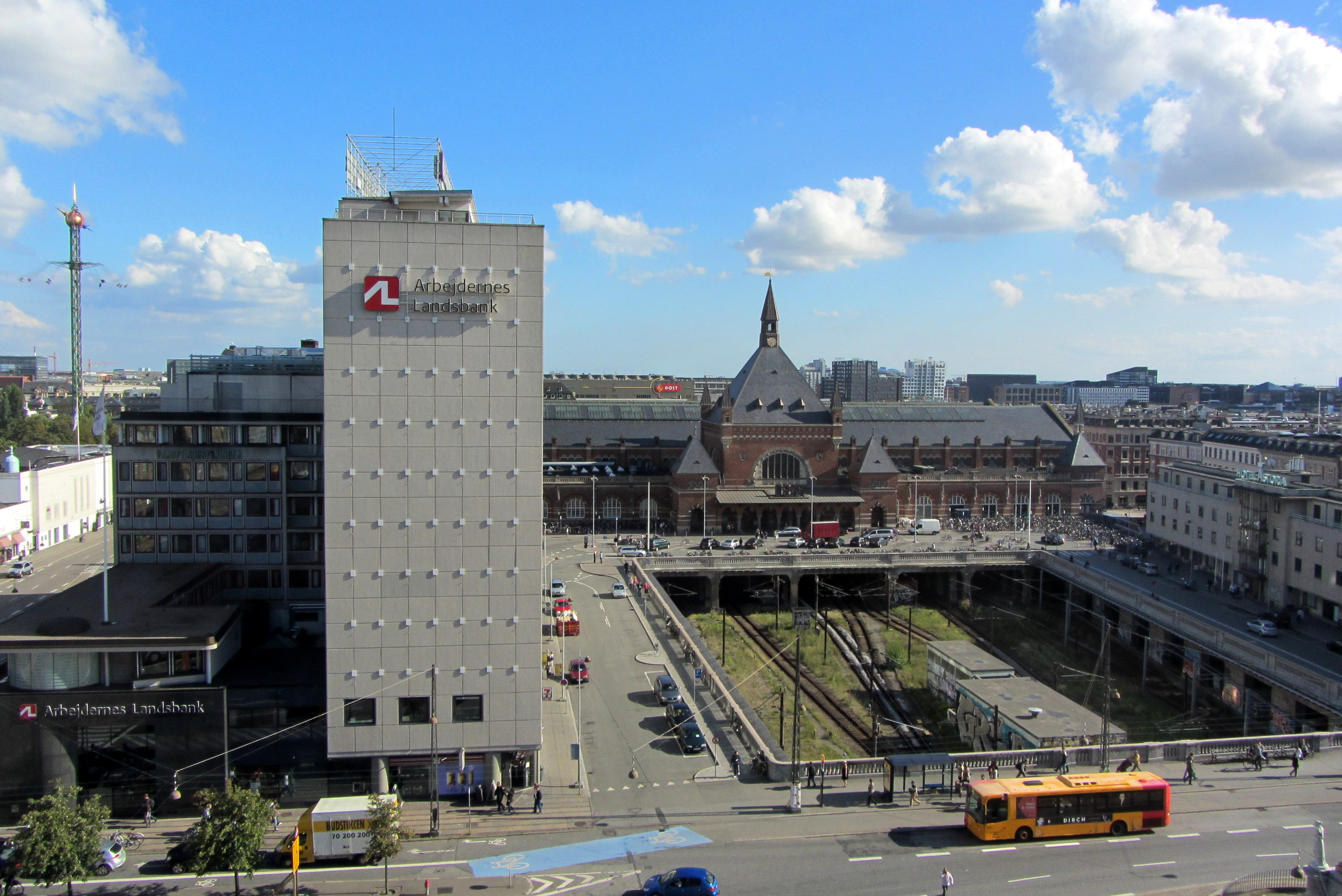
- Headquarters near Copenhagen Central Station
- Company type: Aktieselskabet
- Industry: Financial services
- Founded: 19 June 1919
- Defunct: 5 December 2025
- Headquarters: Vesterbrogade 5, Copenhagen, Denmark
- Key people: Gert R. Jonassen (managing director); Jan Walther Andersen (CEO)
- Operating income: ▼DKK 329.826 million (2015)
- Net income: ▲DKK 137.993 million (2015)
- Total assets: ▲DKK 42,070.389 million (2015)
- Total equity: ▲DKK 5,279.627 billion (2015)
- Owner: Fagligt Fælles Forbund (20%)
- Number of employees: 1,075 (2015)
- Subsidiaries: AL Finans A/S
- Website: www.al-bank.dk

Arbejdernes Landsbank (lit. 'National Workers Bank') was a Danish bank founded in 1919 with approximately 250,000 customers and 1,075 employees. In 2016, it was the 7th largest bank in Denmark. As of 2014 the bank has 70 branches in Denmark.After a merger with Sydbank and Vestjysk Bank in December 2025 it is called AL Sydbank.

== History ==
The bank was founded by Danish trade unions, the Social Democrats and Arbejderkul (union of coal workers) with an initial capital of DKK 2 million, most of which was pledged by Arbejderkul, who were particularly powerful after performing a crucial role in securing Denmark's energy supply during World War I. Although the bank was officially a public company, the shares could not be listed and remained with the labour movement. In practice the bank operated as a cooperative.

During the Great Depression, major shareholder Arbejderkul ran into trouble and the trade union federation joined the ownership of the bank. In the 1960s the bank went through a major growth period, attracting new private customers and many independent branches were opened throughout Denmark. In 1986, ALFINA was bought and later renamed to AL Finans A/S. The bank also owns a share in Østjydsk Bank.

As of 2014, the bank has 24,000 private shareholders, although the trade unions remain the major shareholders.

In December 2025, it was announced the Danish Financial Supervisory Authority (FSA) had granted its final regulatory approval for the acquisition of Arbejdernes Landsbank by the Aabenraa, Denmark-headquartered full service bank, Sydbank A/S.

== Customer satisfaction ==
In customer satisfaction studies among Danish banks, Arbejdernes Landsbank is consistently ranked as the highest rated bank.

== Sponsorships ==
AL is one of the main sponsors of the Danish women's national handball team. On 1 July 2016 AL became the principal sponsor of the football side Brøndby IF in a four-year deal. AL sponsors shirts for AGF and FC Midtjylland and has been a Super Partner of FC Nordsjælland since July 2011.

AL is also sponsoring Giv Håb, an organisation that supports children who experience serious disease or death in their immediate family. AL supports Danish film as a sponsor of the "Bag om filmen"-programme.

== See also ==
- List of banks in Denmark
