= Danske Bank =

Bank headquartered in Denmark

Danske Bank A/S

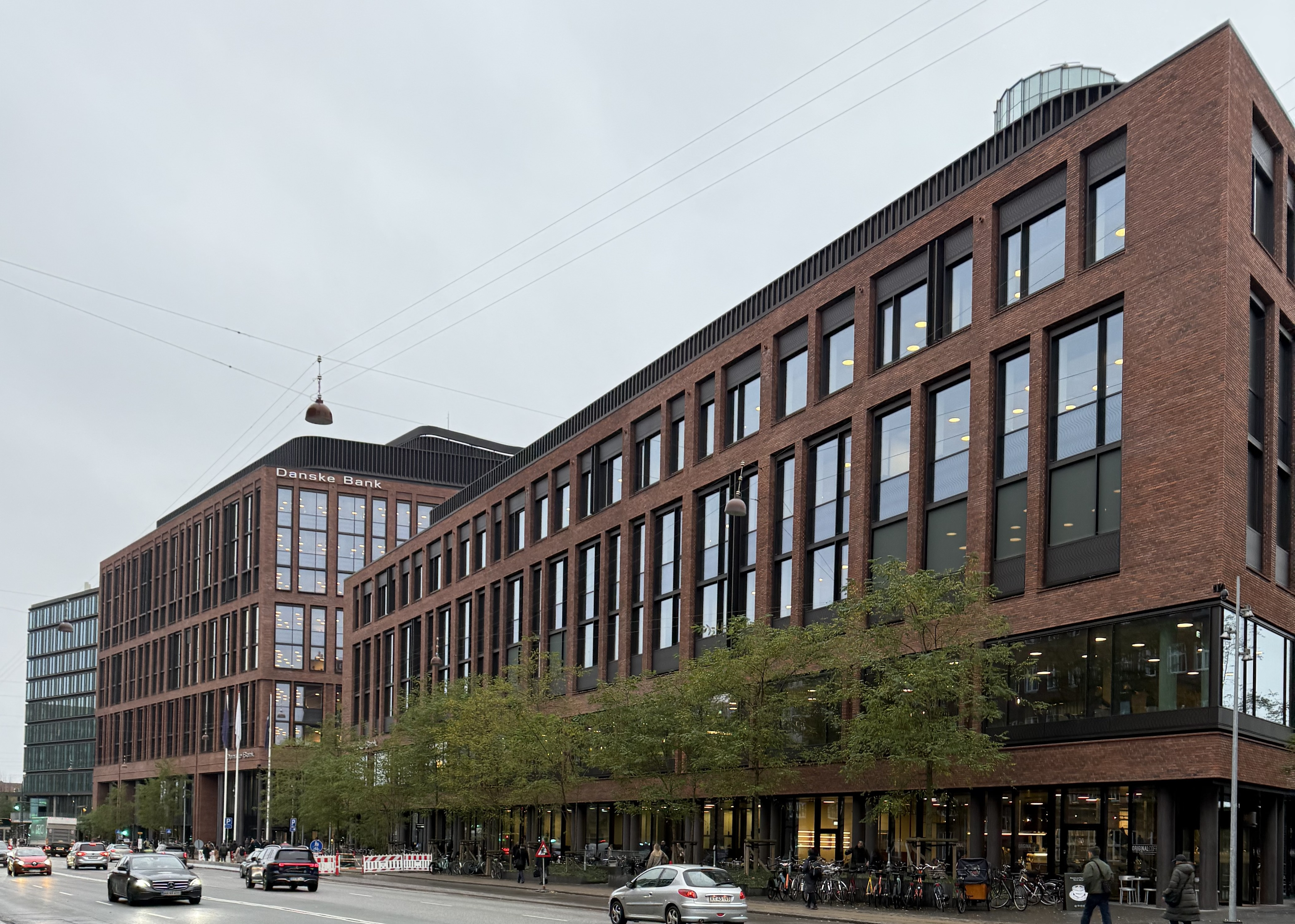
- Head office of Danske Bank in Copenhagen
- Type: Public Aktieselskab
- Traded as: Nasdaq Copenhagen: DANSKE
- ISIN: DK0010274414
- Industry: Financial services
- Founded: 5 October 1871; 155 years ago
- Headquarters: Copenhagen, Denmark
- Key people: Martin Blessing (chair); Carsten Egeriis (CEO)
- Products: Banking, insurance, investment management
- Revenue: 56.84 billion kr. (2025)
- Net income: 23.04 billion kr. (2025)
- Total assets: 3,753.91 billion kr. (2025)
- Total equity: 181.16 billion kr. (2025)
- Owner: A.P. Moller Holding (21%)
- Number of employees: 21,429 (2025)
- Website: danskebank.com/en

Danske Bank A/S (pronounced [ˈtænˀskə ˈpɑŋˀk], lit. 'Danish Bank') is a Danish multinational banking and financial services corporation. Headquartered in Copenhagen, it is the largest bank in Denmark and a major retail bank in the northern European region with over 5 million retail customers.

As of 2025, Danske Bank's largest shareholder with 21% of the share capital was A.P. Moller Holding, the investment holding company of the Maersk family.

Danske was founded 5 October 1871 as Den Danske Landmandsbank, Hypothek- og Vexelbank i Kjøbenhavn ("The Danish Farmers' Bank, Mortgage and Exchange Bank of Copenhagen"), and was subsequently known as Landmandsbanken ("Farmers' Bank") for more than a century. In 1976, the bank changed name to Den Danske Bank ("The Danish Bank"), and the current shortened name was adopted in 2000.

Danske Bank was at the heart of what has been described as possibly the largest money laundering scandal in history when in 2017–2018 it was revealed that €800 billion of suspicious transactions had flowed through the Estonia-based bank branch of Danske Bank from 2007 to 2015. The bank was investigated by authorities in multiple countries. In 2022, Danske Bank pled guilty and agreed to a $2 billion fine in a case from the United States Department of Justice.

== Operations ==
Danske Bank group operates a number of local banks around the Nordic region (Denmark, Norway, Sweden, and Finland) as well as in Northern Ireland. In Denmark, the major expansion occurred in 1990 after the merger with Kjøbenhavns Handelsbank and Provinsbanken. Most of the international operations were established by a series of acquisitions: of Östgöta Enskilda Bank in Sweden in 1997, of Fokus Bank in Norway in 1999, of Northern Bank in Northern Ireland in 2004, and of Sampo Bank in Finland, the Baltic countries, and Russia in 2007.

In February 2019, following the money laundering scandal at its Estonian branch, Danske Bank announced that it will cease all its banking activities in the Baltic countries and Russia.

=== Finland ===
Between 2007 and 2012, Sampo Bank was responsible for Danske Bank's operations in Finland after Danske Bank acquired Sampo Group's banking business while it retained its insurance business. Sampo Bank traced its origins back to 1887, to Postisäästöpankki (translated Postal Savings Bank), a bank associated with the national post office, which accepted deposits from the public at post offices. In 1970, the company was renamed Postipankki (Post Bank). In 1988, the bank became a full-service bank. It was organized as a state-owned limited company. In 1997, the company merged with Suomen Vientiluotto (Finnish Export Credit) to form Leonia Pankki. Leonia Pankki was merged with Sampo Group in 2000, and in 2001 was renamed Sampo Pankki. At the same year, Mandatum Bank merged with Sampo Group. Mandatum was created in 1998 by a merger of Interbank Osakepankki, established in 1988, and Mandatum & Co., established in 1992. On 15 November 2012, Sampo Bank was renamed Danske Bank after banking operations were uniformed under one brand. The purchase of Sampo Pankki by Danske Bank with just over €4 billion was the largest purchase in cash to date in Finland.

=== Republic of Ireland ===
Danske Bank's Irish subsidiary was formerly known as the National Irish Bank, and was originally the Republic of Ireland branch network of Northern Bank, the oldest 'joint stock' bank in Ireland (dating back to 1824). National Irish Bank was created as a separate entity in 1986, at first under the name Northern Bank (Ireland) Limited, when its then owners, UK-based Midland Bank, separated Northern Bank's operations in the Republic of Ireland from its Northern Ireland business.

In 1987, both banks were acquired by National Australia Bank (along with Midland Bank's Scottish subsidiary, Clydesdale Bank). In 1988 the Republic of Ireland operation was renamed National Irish Bank Limited whilst Northern Bank Limited remained the name of the Northern Ireland operation. Nonetheless, a single management team continued to run both banks, which shared many services and back office functions. During this era, the logo of the National Irish Bank was that of the National Australia Bank (at the time), except that the red star had been recoloured green, and "Irish Bank" was added alongside the word "National". The original Northern Bank logo had been the Midland Bank griffin.

On 10 May 2012, Danske Bank announced that Northern Bank and National Irish Bank would be merged on 1 June 2012, under the Northern Bank management team and the Danske Bank name, effectively reversing the separation between the two. The rebrand was completed on 18 November 2012. At the time the bank closed its 27 branches to focus on corporate and private clients.

On 31 October 2013 Danske Bank announced it would be withdrawing all personal banking services in the Republic of Ireland on a phased basis in the first half of 2014.

=== Lithuania ===
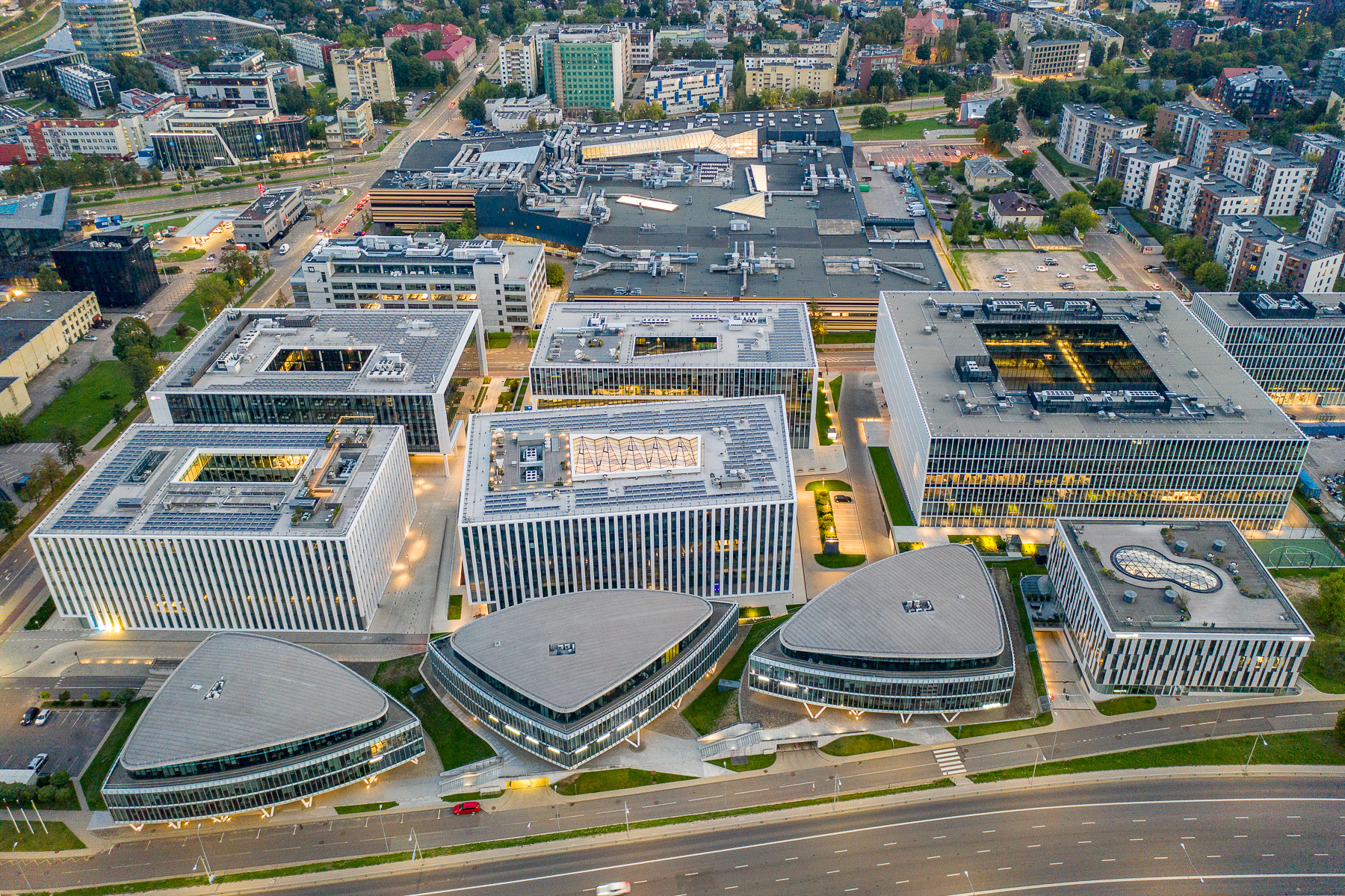
Danske Campus in Vilnius, Lithuania

Origins of Danske Bank in Lithuania traces back to 1994 when Lietuvos Vystymo bankas (Lithuanian Development Bank) was established. Lietuvos Vystymo bankas was acquired by Sampo in 2000, and after acquisition of Sampa Bank by Danske, Sampo bankas became a branch of Danske Bank.

In 2015 Danske Bank established an IT service centre for its group of companies, Danske Group IT Lietuva (DGITL), in Vilnius. During the past years, Danske Bank has employed more than 4,000 employees in Lithuania. In 2019, Danske Bank announced its intentions of ceasing all banking operations in Lithuania, but keeping the local back-office active for internal activities.

=== Sweden ===
Like the other Scandinavian countries, Sweden is one of Danske Bank's largest markets.

=== United Kingdom (Northern Ireland) ===
Danske Bank's Northern Irish subsidiary Northern Bank t/as Danske Bank was founded as the Northern Banking Partnership in Belfast in 1809. It became a public company in 1824 taking the name Northern Banking Company Limited. It became Northern Bank in 1970, after merging with the Belfast Banking Company. Northern Bank was one of the Big Four banks in Northern Ireland. Danske Bank bought the bank from National Australia Bank in December 2004, and Northern Bank continued to operate under its own name until it took on the name of its parent company as its trading name in November 2012. The bank is considered one of the leading retail banks in Northern Ireland with 44 branches and three business centres.

A 2013 Danske Bank £10 note

Northern Bank trading as Danske Bank is one of the three commercial banks in Northern Ireland which are permitted to issue their own banknotes.

=== Former operations ===
==== Estonia ====
Danske Bank in Estonia traces back to 1992 when Eesti Forekspank was established. In 1995, Raepank merged with. In 1998, Eesti Forekspank merged with Eesti Investeerimispank (EstIB) to create Optiva Bank. In 2000, Optiva was acquired by Finnish Sampo Bank and Optiva was accordingly renamed Sampo Pank. In 2007, when Danske Bank acquired Sampo's banking business, Sampo Pank became a branch of Danske Bank.

In 2014, The Estonian Financial Supervision Authority found "large-scale, long-lasting systemic violations of anti-money laundering rules" in the Estonian branch of Danske Bank and notified the Danish authorities on the findings. According to the Estonian Financial Supervision Authority, the activities decreased after they requested the bank to target the violations. In October 2017, Danske Bank confirmed that French authorities were investigating the bank's involvement in money laundering. On 31 July 2018, Estonia's prosecutor general, Lavly Perling, opened a criminal investigation following allegations that the bank had facilitated large-scale money laundering through its Estonian branch. On 19 September 2018, Danske Bank confirmed that Thomas Borgen, CEO of the bank, would resign due to the money laundering scandal. In September, Denmark's Financial Supervisory Authority reopened its investigation of the bank, and the United Kingdom's National Crime Agency announced that it was investigating the use of UK-registered companies. In October, the bank confirmed that the United States Department of Justice had also launched a criminal investigation.

In November, Danish prosecutors filed four preliminary charges against the bank. In February 2019, the Estonian Financial Supervisory Authority ordered the bank to cease its operations in the country within 8 months. In February 2019 Danske announced that it will cease its banking operations in Estonia. In October 2019, the bank closed down all its banking activities in Estonia.

==== Latvia ====
Origins of Danske Bank in Latvia traces back to 1996 when Maras banka was established. Maras was acquired by Sampo in 2004, and after acquisition of Sampo Bank by Danske, Sampo banka became a branch of Danske Bank. In February 2019 Danske announced that it will cease its banking operations in Latvia.

==== Russia ====
Origins of Danske Bank in Russia traces back to Industry and Finance Bank (Profibank) was acquired by Sampo in 2006. after acquisition of Sampo Bank by Danske, it became a branch of Danske Bank. In February 2019 Danske announced that it will cease its banking operations in Russia.

== Controversies ==
=== Money laundering scandal ===
Authorities in Denmark, Estonia, France, and the United Kingdom have launched investigations related to large-scale money laundering through Danske Bank. In 2018, the bank also faced a criminal investigation from the United States Department of Justice into the affair that saw €200bn of non-resident money flow through its branch in Estonia, which was under the supervision of the Financial Supervisory Authority of Denmark (due to location of headquarter) and the Financial Supervisory Authority of Estonia (due to location of branch). Danish prosecutors filed four preliminary charges in November 2018. As a consequence of the money laundering scandal Danske Bank was named as 2018's most corrupted actor by the Organized Crime and Corruption Reporting Project. A Danish woman was remanded in custody in relation to the scandal in December 2021. In December 2022, Danske Bank pled guilty and agreed to a $2 billion fine in a case from the United States Department of Justice.

=== Losing customers' debt records ===
On 30 August 2020, TV 2 and Berlingske released a report detailing how Danske Bank lost track of over 100,000 customers' accounts, which resulted in customers overpaying their debts. The issue was caused by a 2004 IT system migration, as well as several other database and accounting errors that have existed since 1979. Danske Bank issued an apology, calling the case "deeply regrettable," and offered compensation for account holders that the bank confirmed were affected by the issue. In a press release, the bank estimated that the total compensation for customers would be 80-100 million DKK (approximately US$13–16 million). The incident also raised questions on if the bank misled the Financial Supervisory Authority, which may result in fines or disciplinary actions.

=== Shareholder Activism & Buyback ===
The Danske Bank share price dropped more than 70% following the disclosure of the Estonian money laundering scandal and the company was subsequently targeted by activist shareholders. Michael Strabo of Strabo Investments Limited publicly argued the Board of Directors should consider selling the company and implement a share buyback program in order to create shareholder value. In February 2024 Danske Bank announced a share buyback worth DKK 5.5 billion, representing 60bp of CET1 and management expressed the intention to increase the size of the buyback going forward.

== See also ==
- List of banks in Denmark
- List of banks in Sweden
- List of banks in Finland
