= Jak =

Jak or JAK may refer to:

== People ==
- JAK, pen name of British cartoonist Raymond Jackson (1927–1997)
- Jak Airport (born Jack Stafford; 1958–2004), English guitarist
- Jak Alnwick (born 1993), English football goalkeeper
- Jak Crawford (born 2005), American racing driver
- Jak Jones (born 1993), Welsh professional snooker player
- Jak Knight (1993–2022), American actor, comedian and writer
- Jak Orion, stage name used by Australian musician Jack Moffitt in 2010
- Jak Roberto (born 1993), Filipino actor, model, dancer and singer
- José Antonio Kast (born 1966), Chilean politician also known by his initials JAK

== Fictional characters ==
- Jak (Jak and Daxter), in Jak and Daxter video games
- Jak (comics), in the UK comic book The Dandy

== Other uses ==
- Ják, a village in Hungary
- JAK members bank, a Swedish interest-free bank
- Janus kinase, a family of intracellular, nonreceptor tyrosine kinases including
  - Janus kinase 1 (JAK1)
  - Janus kinase 2 (JAK2)
  - Janus kinase 3 (JAK3)

== See also ==
- Jack (disambiguation)
- Jaks, a list of people with the surname
