= List of banks in Sweden =

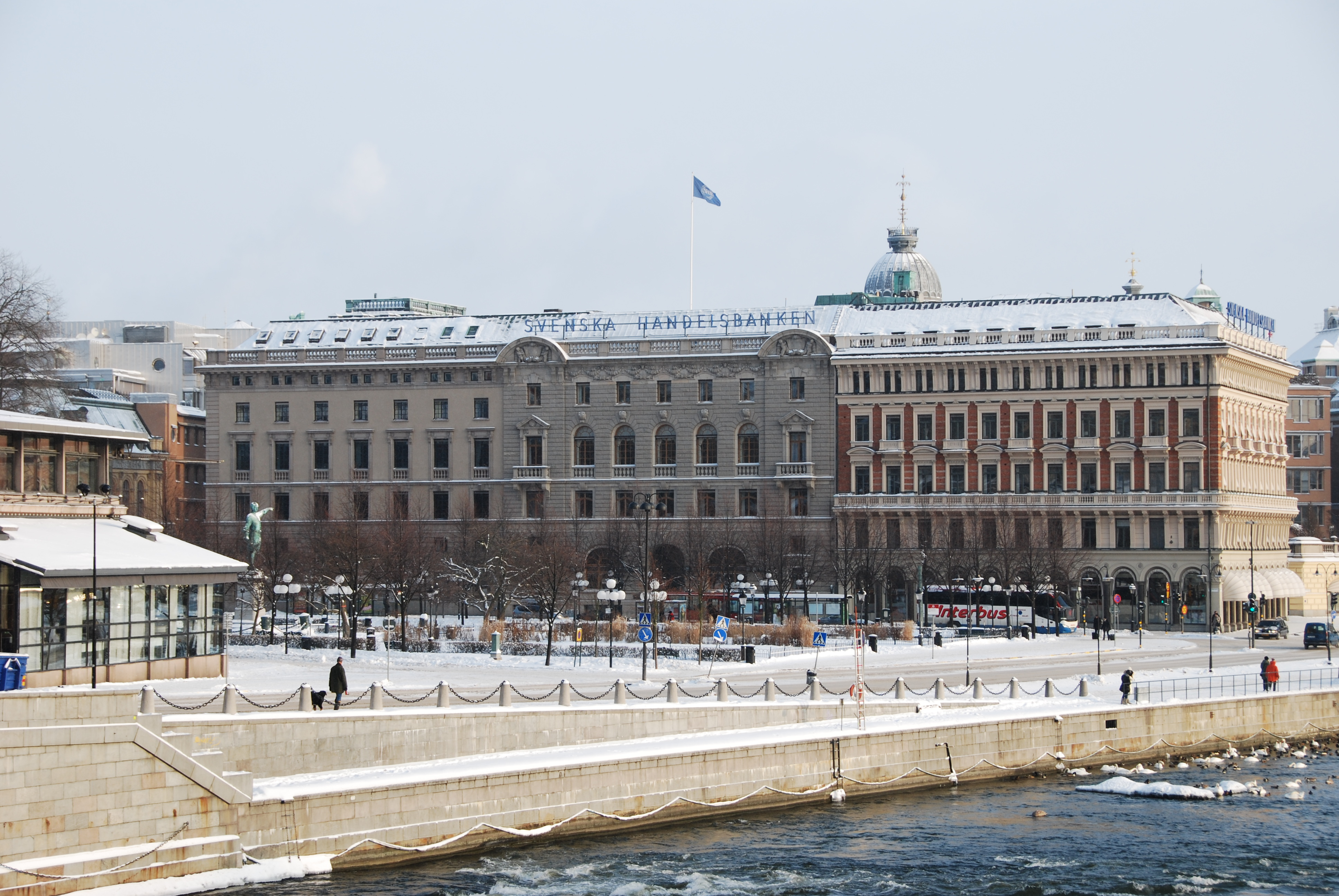
Handelsbanken head office, Stockholm

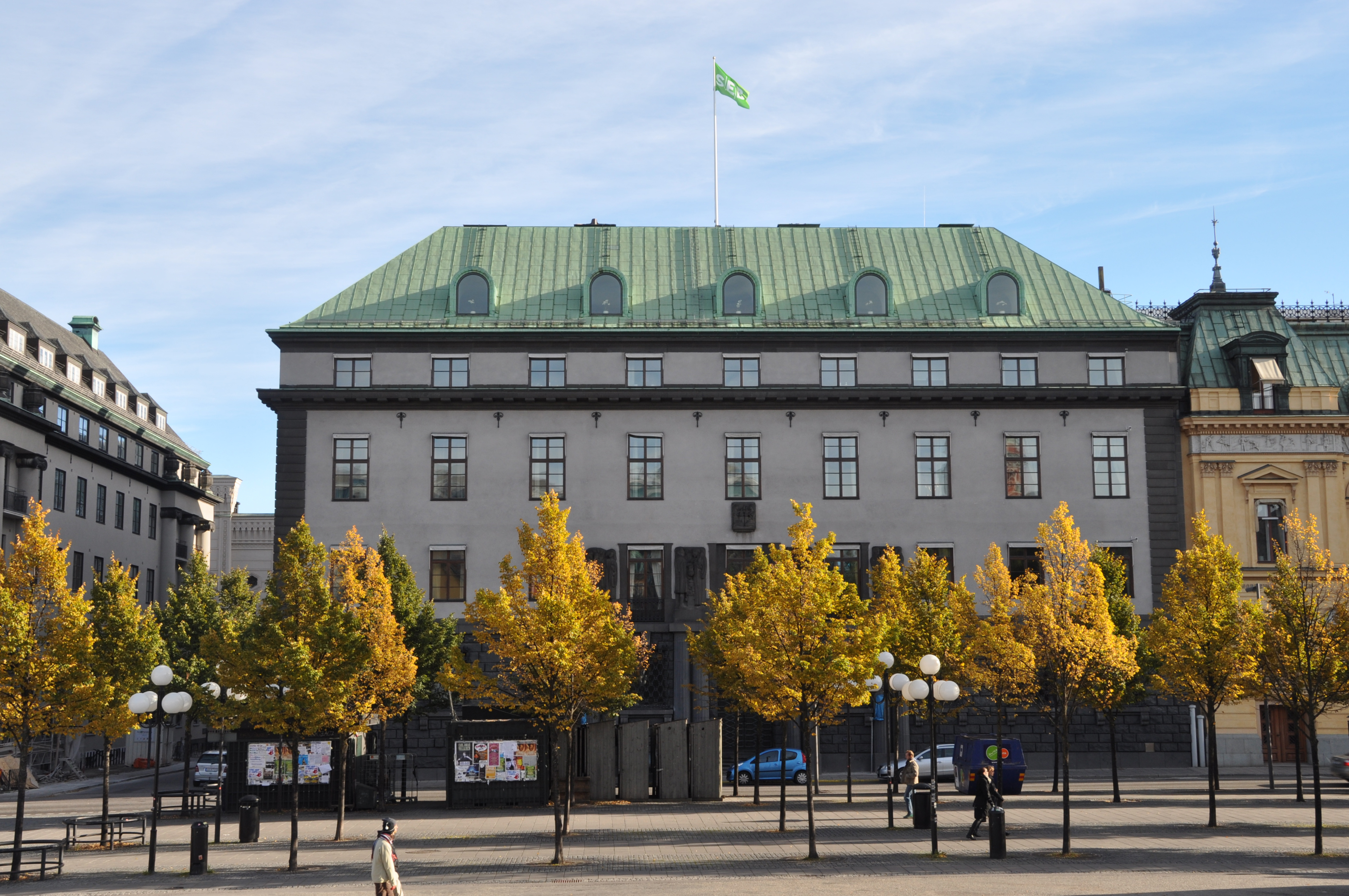
SEB head office, Stockholm

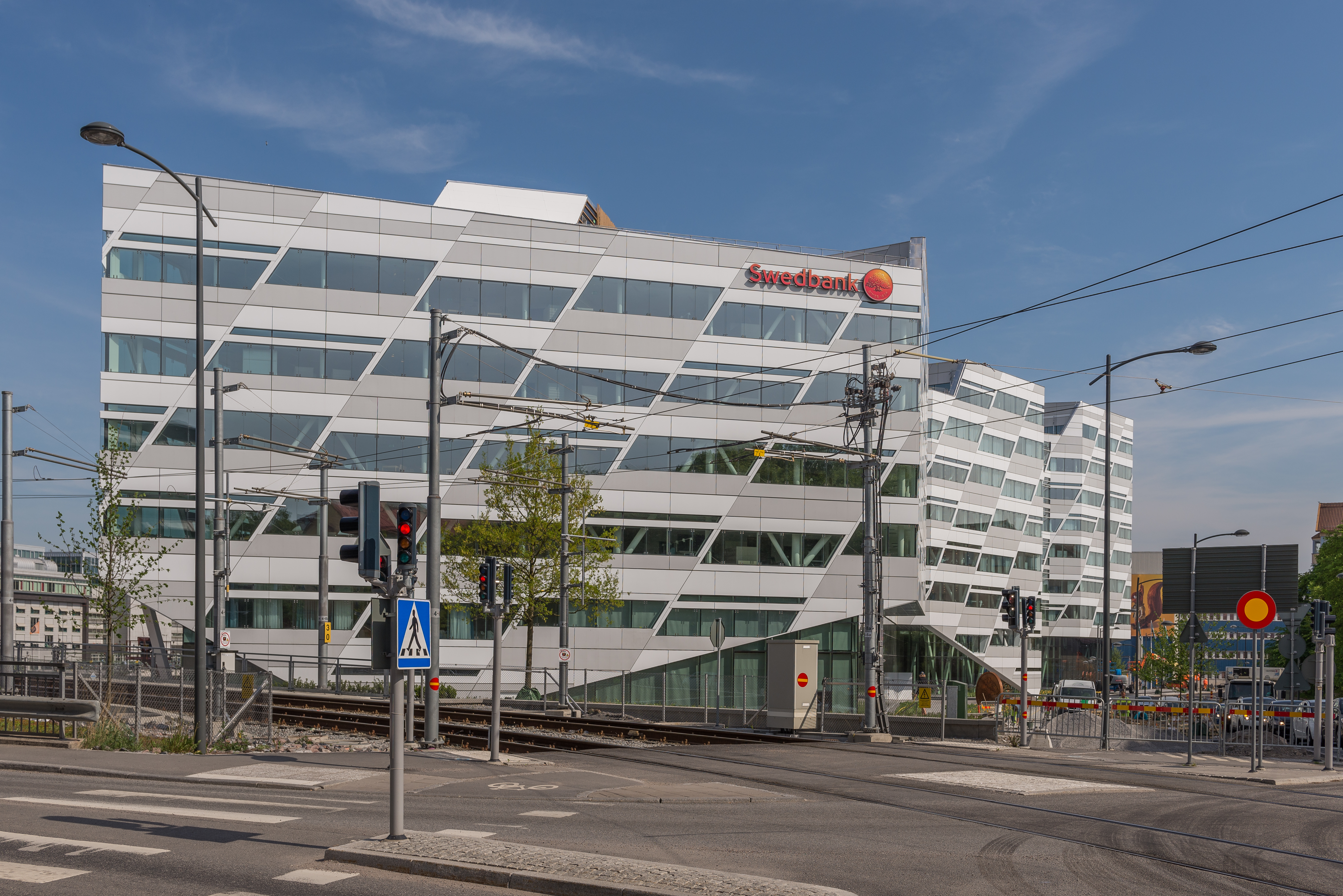
Swedbank head office, Stockholm

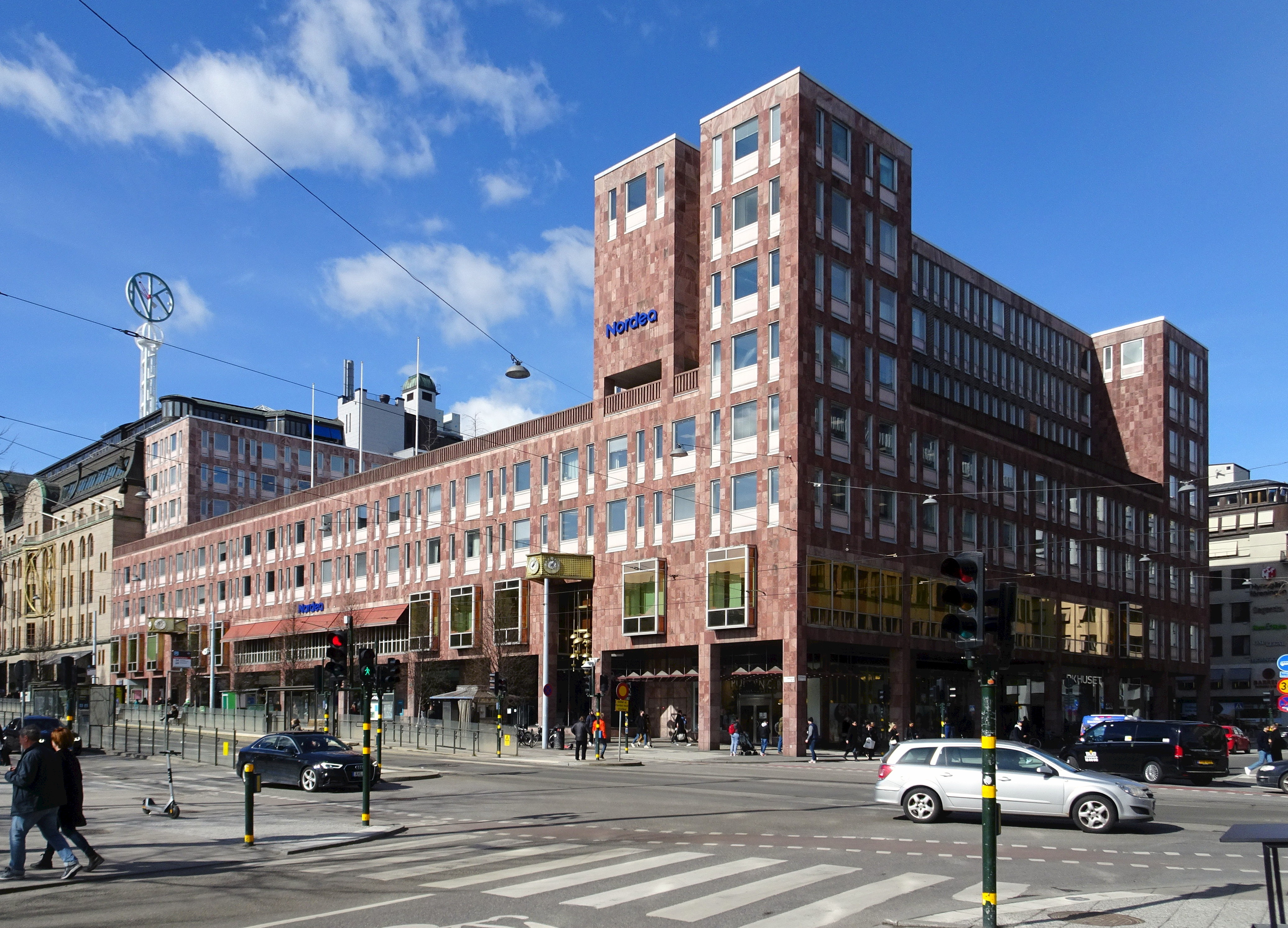
Nordea Sweden head office, Stockholm

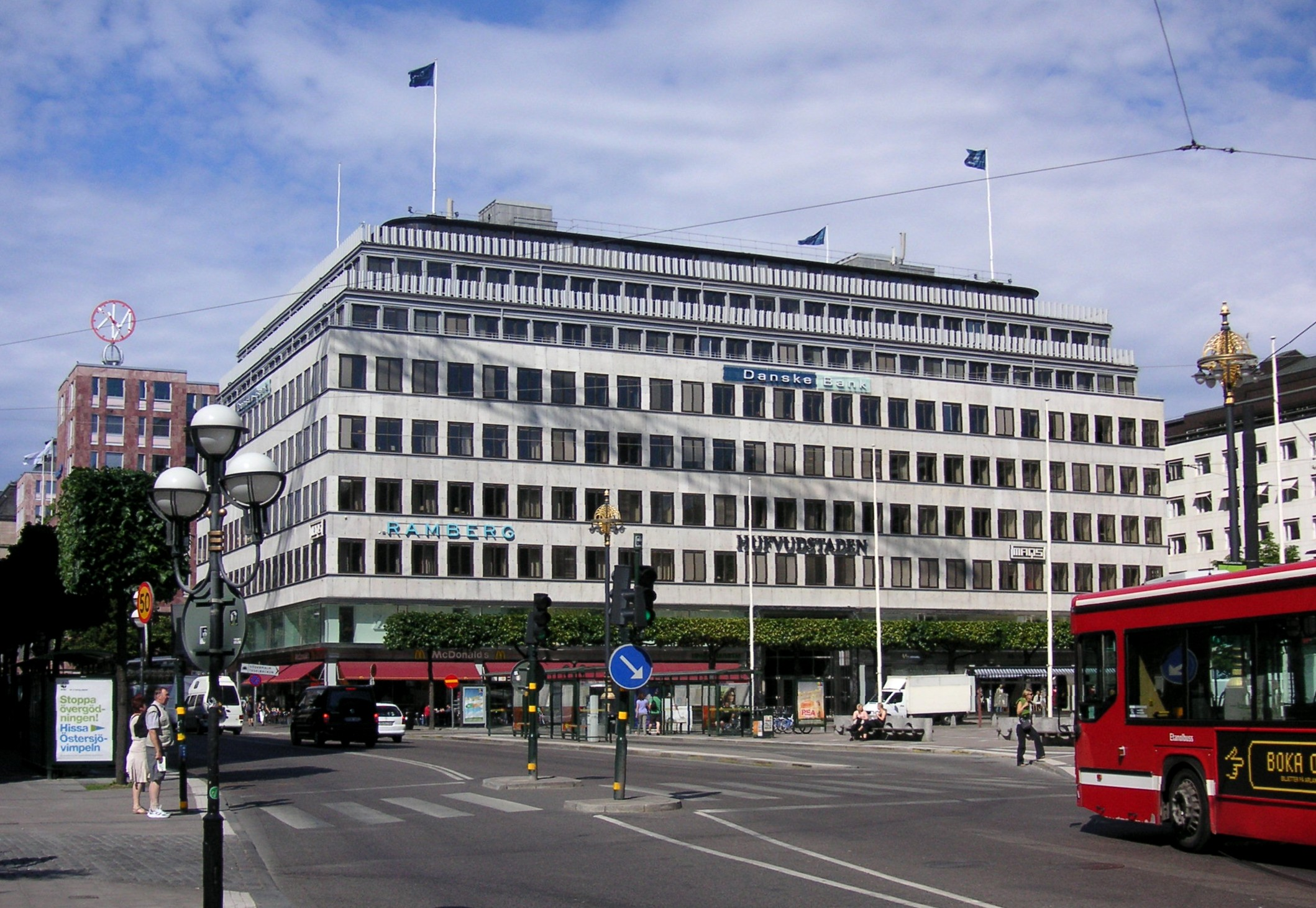
Danske Bank Sweden head office, Stockholm

The following list of banks in Sweden is to be understood within the framework of the European single market, which means that Sweden's banking system is more open to cross-border banking operations than peers outside of the European Union. It is based on the list of Swedish monetary financial institutions as updated on 7 January 2026 and published by the Sveriges Riksbank, the country's central bank.

Finansinspektionen is the Swedish bank supervisory authority, whereas Riksgälden, the country's national debt office, acts as bank resolution authority.

== Overview ==
As of 2026, Sweden's banking sector includes around 87 licensed banks, consisting of domestic institutions, foreign bank branches, and specialized digital banks. The market is highly concentrated, with a small number of major banks dominating lending and deposit activity, while smaller niche and fintech banks continue to expand in areas such as consumer finance and digital services.

== Major banks ==
As of early 2026, the Riksbank listed the following five as major banks in Sweden:

- Handelsbanken
- SEB
- Swedbank
- Nordea
- Danske Bank

The first three are banking groups headquartered in Stockholm, whereas the latter two are branches of banking groups established, respectively, in Finland and Denmark.

As of early 2026, those five groups owned the following Swedish credit institution subsidiaries: Handelsbanken Finans AB and Stadshypotek AB (Handelsbanken); SEB Kort Bank AB (SEB); Swedbank Hypotek AB and PayEx (Swedbank); Nordea Finans Sverige AB and Nordea Hypotek AB (Nordea); and Danske Hypotek AB (Danske Bank).

Handelsbanken, SEB, Swedbank, and Nordea Hypotek AB were designated by Finansinspektionen as "Category 1" banks for supervisory purposes, and as "other systemically important institutions" (O-SII) under the criteria of the European Banking Authority.

== Medium-sized banks ==
Based on the Finansinspektionen classification of banks into four categories as of 30 September 2026, by decreasing score of systemic importance:

=== Category 2 ===
- SBAB Bank AB, a government-owned bank, including subsidiary AB Sveriges Säkerställda Obligationer
- Kommuninvest i Sverige AB, credit arm of Kommuninvest
- Länsförsäkringar Bank AB, including subsidiaries Länsförsäkringar Finans AB and Länsförsäkringar Hypotek AB
- Swedish Export Credit Corporation
- Nordnet Bank AB
- Avanza Bank AB
- Klarna Bank AB

=== Category 3 ===
- NOBA Bank Group AB
- Skandiabanken AB
- Landshypotek Bank AB
- Sparbanken Skåne AB
- DNB Carnegie Investment Bank AB, Swedish subsidiary of DNB Bank

Danske Hypotek AB and Nordea Finans Sverige AG, subsidiaries respectively of Danske Bank and Nordea, are also under Finansinspektionen's Category 3.

== Smaller banks ==
The list below is derived from the Riksbank's update at 7 January 2026. As of 30 September 2026, these banks were designated by Finansinspectionen as Category 4.

=== Commercial banks ===
- 0to9 AB
- AK Nordic AB
- Anyfin AB
- Arktika Capital AB
- Aros Kapital AB
- Avida Finans AB
- Bankaktiebolaget Nordiska
- Borgo AB
- Brixo AB
- Brocc Finance AB
- Coeli Finance AB
- Ecster AB
- Enity Bank Group AB
- EnterCard Group AB
- EP Bank AB
- Fedelta Finance AB
- Frink AB
- Froda AB
- Garantum Fondkommission AB
- Hoist Finance AB
- ICA Banken AB
- Ikano Bank AB
- Lantmännen Finans AB
- Lea Bank AB
- Mangold Fondkommission AB
- Marginalen Bank AB
- MedMera Bank AB, subsidiary of Kooperativa Förbundet
- Moank AB
- Morrow Bank AB
- Mynt AB
- Norion Bank AB
- Northmill Bank AB
- OK-Q8 Bank AB
- Pareto Securities AB
- Qliro AB
- Qred Bank AB
- Rediem Capital AB
- Resurs Bank AB
- Serafim Finans AB
- Siemens Financial Services AB, subsidiary of Siemens Financial Services
- Steven AB
- Svea Bank AB
- Telia Finance AB, subsidiary of Telia Company
- TF Bank AB, with three subsidiaries (Goldcup 37337 AB, TF Bank Nordic AB, Yieldloop AB)
- Toyota Material Handling Commercial Finance AB, Swedish subsidiary of Toyota
- Ziklo Bank AB, part-owned by Volvo Cars

The following commercial banks, also in Finansinspektionen's Category 4, are former savings banks that have been reorganized as joint-stock companies. Most of them remain majority-owned by a savings bank foundation. By mid-2025, Swedbank owned a large minority stake in five of them.

- Falkenbergs Sparbank AB
- Ölands Bank AB
- Sörmlands Sparbank AB
- Sparbanken Alingsås AB
- Sparbanken Bergslagen AB
- Sparbanken Eken AB
- Sparbanken Göinge AB
- Sparbanken Lidköping AB
- Sparbanken Mälardalen AB
- Sparbanken Sjuhärad AB
- Sparbanken Skaraborg AB
- Sparbanken Spira AB
- Varbergs Sparbank AB
- Vimmerby Sparbank AB

=== Cooperative banks ===
- Ekobanken medlemsbank
- JAK Medlemsbank

=== Savings banks ===
Many Swedish savings banks consolidated during the 1990–1994 Swedish financial crisis to form Swedbank, whereas the ones listed below have remained independent local credit institutions under special legislation.

- Ålems Sparbank
- Åse Viste Sparbank
- Bjursås Sparbank
- Dalslands Sparbank
- Ekeby Sparbank
- Fryksdalens Sparbank
- Hälsinglands Sparbank
- Häradssparbanken Mönsterås
- Högsby Sparbank
- Ivetofta Sparbank i Bromölla
- Kinda-Ydre Sparbank
- Laholms Sparbank
- Lekebergs Sparbank
- Leksands Sparbank
- Lönneberga-Tuna-Vena Sparbank
- Markaryds sparbank
- Mjöbäcks Sparbank
- Norrbärke Sparbank
- Orusts Sparbank
- Roslagens Sparbank
- Sala Sparbank
- Sidensjö sparbank
- Skurups Sparbank
- Snapphanebygdens Sparbank
- Södra Hestra Sparbank
- Sölvesborg-Mjällby Sparbank
- Sparbanken Boken
- Sparbanken Gotland
- Sparbanken i Enköping
- Sparbanken i Karlshamn
- Sparbanken Nordb
- Sparbanken Syd
- Sparbanken Tanum
- Sparbanken Tranemo
- Tidaholms Sparbank
- Tjörns Sparbank
- Ulricehamns Sparbank
- Vadstena Sparbank
- Valdemarsviks Sparbank
- Virserums Sparbank
- Westra Wermlands Sparbank

== Foreign bank branches ==
=== EEA branches ===
In addition to the above-mentioned major branches of Danske Bank and Nordea, the Riksbank's list of Swedish monetary financial institutions as of 7 January 2026 included Swedish branches of the following banks established elsewhere in the European Economic Area (EEA):

- (Germany) Aareal Bank
- (Netherlands) Adyen
- (Belgium) Aion Bank SA, subsidiary of UniCredit (Italy)
- (Finland) Bank of Åland
- (Spain) Allfunds Bank
- (Republic of Ireland) Bank of America Merrill Lynch International DAC, subsidiary of Bank of America (United States)
- (Luxembourg) Bank of China (Europe) S.A., subsidiary of Bank of China
- (Luxembourg) Banking Circle S.A.
- (Republic of Ireland) Barclays Bank Ireland PLC, subsidiary of Barclays (United Kingdom)
- (Estonia) Bigbank
- (France) BNP Paribas
- (Republic of Ireland) Citibank Europe plc, subsidiary of Citigroup (United States)
- (France) Crédit Agricole Corporate and Investment Bank, subsidiary of Crédit Agricole (France)
- (Germany) Deutsche Bank
- (Norway) DNB Bank
- (Belgium) Euroclear Bank
- (Denmark) Express Bank, subsidiary of BNP Paribas (France)
- (Denmark) Facit Bank
- (Germany) FNZ Bank SE
- (Germany) Goldman Sachs Bank Europe SE, subsidiary of Goldman Sachs (United States)
- (France) HSBC Continental Europe, subsidiary of HSBC (United Kingdom)
- (Germany) J.P. Morgan SE, subsidiary of JPMorgan Chase (United States)
- (Germany) Joh. Berenberg, Gossler & Co. KG
- (Denmark) Lån & Spar Bank
- (Germany) Landesbank Hessen-Thüringen Girozentrale
- (Netherlands) NatWest Markets NV, subsidiary of NatWest Markets (United Kingdom)
- (Luxembourg) Northern Trust Global Services SE, subsidiary of Northern Trust (United States)
- (Norway) Pareto Bank
- (Germany) PBB Deutsche Pfandbriefbank
- (France) RCI Banque
- (Norway) Santander Consumer Bank AS, subsidiary of Santander Bank (Spain)
- (France) Société Générale
- (Germany) Standard Chartered Bank AG, subsidiary of Standard Chartered (United Kingdom)
- (Germany) Toyota Kreditbank GmbH, subsidiary of Toyota (Japan)
- (Germany) Trade Republic Bank
- (Germany) UBS Europe SE, subsidiary of UBS (Switzerland)

=== Third-country branches ===
As of 13 October 2025, no bank established outside the EEA had branches in Sweden, or "third-country branches" in EU parlance.

== Policy banks ==
The Sveriges Riksbank and Svenska Skeppshypotekskassan (lit. 'Swedish Shipping Mortgage Bank') are designated as monetary financial institutions under Swedish law, but they are not within the scope of EU Capital Requirements Directives.

== Defunct banks ==
- Stockholms Banco (1657-1667)
- Östgöta Enskilda Bank (1837-2011)
- Smålands Bank (1837-1972)
- Skandinaviska Banken (1864-1972)
- Örebro Folkbank (1867-1933)
- Folkärna Folkbank (1868-1913)
- Norrköpings Folkbank (1871-1940)
- Blekinge Bank (1873-1918)
- AB Kreditkassan av år 1922 (1922-1937)
- Sveriges Kreditbanken (1923-1974)
- Föreningsbanken Halmstad (1949-1988)
- Postbanken (1960-1974)
- Sveriges Investeringsbank (1967-1989)
- PK-Banken (1974-1990)
- Nordbanken (1986-1997)
- Föreningsbanken (1992-1997)
- HQ Bank (2006-2010)
- Sparbanken Öresund (2010-2014)

== See also ==
- List of banks in Europe
- List of banks in the euro area
