= Credit rating =

Evaluation of the credit risk of a prospective debtor

A credit rating is an evaluation of the credit risk of a prospective debtor (an individual, a business, company or a government). It is the practice of predicting or forecasting the ability of a supposed debtor to pay back the debt or default. The credit rating represents an evaluation from a credit rating agency of the qualitative and quantitative information for the prospective debtor, including information provided by the prospective debtor and other non-public information obtained by the credit rating agency's analysts.

Credit reporting (or credit score) is a subset of credit rating. It is a numeric evaluation of an individual's credit worthiness, which is done by a credit bureau or consumer credit reporting agency.

== Sovereign credit ratings ==
Country risk rankings (Q4 2019)Least risky countries, Score out of 100Source: Euromoney country risk
Rank	Rank Change	Country	Overall Score
1	▲1	Switzerland	88.16
2	▼1	Singapore	87.86
3	-	Norway	87.8
4	-	Denmark	86.9
5	-	Sweden	84.72
6	-	Luxembourg	84.52
7	▲1	Finland	84.08
8	▼1	Netherlands	83.85
9	▲1	Australia	81.21
10	▼1	New Zealand	80.32

A sovereign credit rating is the credit rating of a sovereign entity, such as a national government. The sovereign credit rating indicates the risk level of the investing environment of a country and is used by investors when looking to invest in particular jurisdictions, and also takes into account political risk.

The "country risk rankings" table shows the ten least-risky countries for investment as of January 2018. Ratings are further broken down into components including political risk, economic risk. Euromoney's bi-annual country risk index monitors the political and economic stability of 185 sovereign countries, with Singapore often emerging as the least risky country since 2017 – it is also one of the only few countries in the world as well as the only in Asia to achieve a AAA sovereign credit rankings from all major credit agencies.

Results focus foremost on economics, specifically sovereign default risk or payment default risk for exporters (also known as a trade credit risk). A. M. Best defines "country risk" as the risk that country-specific factors could adversely affect an insurer's ability to meet its financial obligations.

== Short and long-term ratings ==
A rating expresses the likelihood that the rated party will go into default within a given time horizon. In general, a time horizon of one year or under is considered short term, and anything above that is considered long term. In the past institutional investors preferred to consider long-term ratings. Nowadays, short-term ratings are commonly used.

== Corporate credit ratings ==
Credit ratings can address a corporation's financial instruments i.e. debt security such as a bond, but also the corporations itself. Ratings are assigned by credit rating agencies, the largest of which are Standard & Poor's, Moody's and Fitch Ratings. They use letter designations such as A, B, C. Higher grades are intended to represent a lower probability of default.

=== Top companies with best credit rating ===
Source for banking companies:

Name of the company	Type of business	Country	Fitch	Moody's	S&P Global
Microsoft	Software / technology	USA	AAA	Aaa	AAA
Johnson & Johnson	Pharmaceutical	USA	AAA	Aaa	AAA
KfW	Bank	Germany	AAA	Aaa	AAA
Zurich Cantonal Bank	Bank	Switzerland	AAA	Aaa	AAA
BNG Bank	Bank	Netherlands	AAA	Aaa	AAA
Landwirtschaftliche Rentenbank	Bank	Germany	AAA	Aaa	AAA
Temasek Holdings	Investment	Singapore	Unranked	Aaa	AAA
Nederlandse Waterschapsbank	Bank	Netherlands	Unranked	Aaa	AAA
Kommunalbanken	Bank	Norway	Unranked	Aaa	AAA

Agencies do not attach a hard number of probability of default to each grade, preferring descriptive definitions such as: "the obligor's capacity to meet its financial commitment on the obligation is extremely strong," or "less vulnerable to non-payment than other speculative issues…" (Standard and Poors' definition of an AAA-rated and a BB-rated bond respectively). However, some studies have estimated the average risk and reward of bonds by rating. One study by Moody's claimed that over a "5-year time horizon" bonds it gave its highest rating (Aaa) to had a "cumulative default rate" of 0.18%, the next highest (Aa2) 0.28%, the next (Baa2) 2.11%, 8.82% for the next (Ba2), and 31.24% for the lowest it studied (B2). (See "Default rate" in "Estimated spreads and default rates by rating grade" table to right.) Over a longer period, it stated "the order is by and large, but not exactly, preserved".

Another study in Journal of Finance calculated the additional interest rate or "spread" corporate bonds pay over that of "riskless" US Treasury bonds, according to the bonds' rating. (See "Basis point spread" in table to right.) Looking at rated bonds for 1973–89, the authors found a AAA-rated bond paid 43 "basis points" (or 43/100 of a percentage point) over a US Treasury bond (so that it would yield 3.43% if the Treasury yielded 3.00%). A CCC-rated "junk" (or speculative) bond, on the other hand, paid over 7% (724 basis points) more than a Treasury bond on average over that period.

Different rating agencies may use variations of an alphabetical combination of lowercase and uppercase letters, with either plus or minus signs or numbers added to further fine-tune the rating (see colored chart). The Standard & Poor's rating scale uses uppercase letters and pluses and minuses. The Moody's rating system uses numbers and lowercase letters as well as uppercase.

While Moody's, S&P and Fitch Ratings control approximately 95% of the credit ratings business, they are not the only rating agencies. DBRS's long-term ratings scale is somewhat similar to Standard & Poor's and Fitch Ratings with the words high and low replacing the + and −. It goes as follows, from excellent to poor: AAA, AA (high), AA, AA (low), A (high), A, A (low), BBB (high), BBB, BBB (low), BB (high), BB, BB (low), B (high), B, B (low), CCC (high), CCC, CCC (low), CC (high), CC, CC (low), C (high), C, C (low) and D. The short-term ratings often map to long-term ratings though there is room for exceptions at the high or low side of each equivalent.

S&P, Moody's, Fitch and DBRS are the only four ratings agencies that are recognized by the European Central Bank (ECB) for determining collateral requirements for banks to borrow from the central bank. The ECB uses a first, best rule among the four agencies that have the designated ECAI status, which means that it takes the highest rating among the four agencies – S&P, Moody's, Fitch and DBRS – to determine haircuts and collateral requirements for borrowing. Ratings in Europe have been under close scrutiny, particularly the highest ratings given to countries like Spain, Ireland and Italy, because they affect how much banks can borrow against sovereign debt they hold.

A. M. Best rates from excellent to poor in the following manner: A++, A+, A, A−, B++, B+, B, B−, C++, C+, C, C−, D, E, F, and S. The CTRISKS rating system is as follows: CT3A, CT2A, CT1A, CT3B, CT2B, CT1B, CT3C, CT2C and CT1C. All these CTRISKS grades are mapped to one-year probability of default.

Under the EU Credit Rating Agency Regulation (CRAR), the European Banking Authority has developed a series of mapping tables that map ratings to the "Credit Quality Steps" (CQS) as set out in regulatory capital rules and map the CQS to short run and long run benchmark default rates. These are provided in the table below:

Moody's		Standard & Poor's		Fitch Ratings		Rating description	EU Credit Quality Step	Long run benchmark default rates (mid value)	Short run benchmark default rates (trigger level)
Long-term	Short-term	Long-term	Short-term	Long-term	Short-term	Rating description	EU Credit Quality Step	Long run benchmark default rates (mid value)	Short run benchmark default rates (trigger level)
Aaa	P-1	AAA	A-1+	AAA	F1+	Prime	1	0.1%	1.2%
Aa1	P-1	AA+	A-1+	AA+	F1+	High grade	1	0.1%	1.2%
Aa2	P-1	AA	A-1+	AA	F1+	High grade	1	0.1%	1.2%
Aa3	P-1	AA−	A-1+	AA−	F1+	High grade	1	0.1%	1.2%
A1	P-1	A+	A-1	A+	F1	Upper medium grade	2	0.25%	1.3%
A2	P-1	A	A-1	A	F1	Upper medium grade	2	0.25%	1.3%
A3	P-2	A−	A-2	A−	F2	Upper medium grade	2	0.25%	1.3%
Baa1	P-2	BBB+	A-2	BBB+	F2	Lower medium grade	3	1.0%	3.0%
Baa2	P-3	BBB	A-2	BBB	F3	Lower medium grade	3	1.0%	3.0%
Baa3	P-3	BBB−	A-3	BBB−	F3	Lower medium grade	3	1.0%	3.0%
Ba1	Not Prime	BB+	B	BB+	B	Non-investment grade speculative	4	7.5%	12.4%
Ba2	Not Prime	BB	B	BB	B	Non-investment grade speculative	4	7.5%	12.4%
Ba3	Not Prime	BB−	B	BB−	B	Non-investment grade speculative	4	7.5%	12.4%
B1	Not Prime	B+	B	B+	B	Highly speculative	5	20%	35%
B2	Not Prime	B	B	B	B	Highly speculative	5	20%	35%
B3	Not Prime	B−	B	B−	B	Highly speculative	5	20%	35%
Caa1	Not Prime	CCC+	C	CCC+	C	Substantial risks	6	34%	not applicable
Caa2	Not Prime	CCC	C	CCC	C	Substantial risks	6	34%	not applicable
Caa3	Not Prime	CCC−	C	CCC−	C	Substantial risks	6	34%	not applicable
Ca	Not Prime	CC	C	CC	C	Extremely speculative	6	34%	not applicable
Ca	Not Prime	C	C	C	C	Default imminent	6	34%	not applicable
C	Not Prime	RD	D	RD	D	In default	6	34%	not applicable
/	Not Prime	SD	D	D	D	In default	6	34%	not applicable
/	Not Prime	D	D	/	D	In default	6	34%	not applicable
