= Tetrameranthus =

Scientific classification
- Kingdom: Plantae
- Clade: Embryophytes
- Clade: Tracheophytes
- Clade: Spermatophytes
- Clade: Angiosperms
- Clade: Magnoliids
- Order: Magnoliales
- Family: Annonaceae
- Subfamily: Ambavioideae
- Genus: Tetrameranthus; R.E.Fr.

Genus of plants

Tetrameranthus is a genus of plant in family Annonaceae. It contains 8 species, all occurring in South America.

As of January 2025, Plants of the World Online accepts the following 8 species:

- Tetrameranthus duckei R.E.Fr. – Brazil North, Colombia, Peru, Venezuela
- Tetrameranthus globuliferus Westra (as Tetrameranthus globulifer) – Ecuador
- Tetrameranthus guianensis Westra & Maas – Brazil North, French Guiana
- Tetrameranthus laomae D.R.Simpson – Brazil North, Colombia, Peru
- Tetrameranthus macrocarpus R.E.Fr. – Colombia
- Tetrameranthus pachycarpus Westra – Peru
- Tetrameranthus trichocarpus Maas & Westra – Peru
- Tetrameranthus umbellatus Westra – Brazil North, Peru
