= LGFA =

LGFA may refer to:

- Ladies' Gaelic Football Association, Ireland
- Local government funding agency, financing mechanism for municipal projects etc.
