= Municipal bond =

Bond issued by a local government

A municipal bond (commonly known as a muni) is a bond issued by state or local governments, or entities they create such as authorities and special districts. In the United States, interest income received by holders of municipal bonds is often, but not always, exempt from federal and state income taxation. Typically, only investors in the highest tax brackets benefit from buying tax-exempt municipal bonds instead of taxable bonds. Taxable equivalent yield calculations are required to make fair comparisons between the two categories.

The U.S. municipal debt market is relatively small compared to the corporate market: total municipal debt outstanding was $4 trillion as of the first quarter of 2021, compared to nearly $15 trillion in the corporate and foreign markets. But conversely, the number of municipal bond issuers (state and local governments and other affiliated entities) far exceeds the number of corporate bond issuers.

Local authorities in many other countries in the world issue similar bonds, sometimes called local authority bonds or other names.

== History ==
Municipal debt predates corporate debt by several centuries—the early Renaissance Italian city-states borrowed money from major banking families. Borrowing by American cities dates to the nineteenth century, and records of U.S. municipal bonds indicate use around the early 1800s. Officially the first recorded municipal bond was a general obligation bond issued by the City of New York for a canal in 1812. During the 1840s, many U.S. cities were in debt, and by 1843 cities had roughly $25 million in outstanding debt. In the ensuing decades, rapid urban development demonstrated a correspondingly explosive growth in municipal debt. The debt was used to finance both urban improvements and a growing system of public education.

Years after the American Civil War, significant local debt was issued to build railroads. Railroads were private corporations, and these bonds were very similar to today's industrial revenue bonds. Construction costs in 1873 for one of the largest transcontinental railroads, the Northern Pacific, closed down access to new capital. Around the same time, the largest bank of the country of the time, which was owned by the same investor as that of Northern Pacific, collapsed. Smaller firms followed suit as well as the stock market. The 1873 panic and years of depression that followed put an abrupt but temporary halt to the rapid growth of municipal debt. Responding to widespread defaults that jolted the municipal bond market of the day, new state statutes were passed that restricted the issuance of local debt. Several states wrote these restrictions into their constitutions. Railroad bonds and their legality were widely challenged, and this gave rise to the market-wide demand that an opinion of qualified bond counsel accompany each new issue.

When the U.S. economy began to move forward once again, municipal debt continued its momentum, which was maintained well into the early part of the twentieth century. The Great Depression of the 1930s halted growth, although defaults were not as severe as in the 1870s. Leading up to World War II, many American resources were devoted to the military, and prewar municipal debt burst into a new period of rapid growth for an ever-increasing variety of uses. Today, in addition to the 50 states and their local governments (including cities, counties, villages and school districts), the District of Columbia and U.S. territories and possessions (American Samoa, the Commonwealth of Puerto Rico, Guam, the Northern Mariana Islands, and the U.S. Virgin Islands) can and do issue municipal bonds. Another important category of municipal bond issuers which includes authorities and special districts has also grown in number and variety in recent years. The two most prominent early authorities were the Port of New York Authority, formed in 1921 and renamed Port Authority of New York and New Jersey in 1972, and the Triborough Bridge Authority (now the Triborough Bridge and Tunnel Authority), formed in 1933. The debt issues of these two authorities are exempt from federal, state and local governments taxes.

== Types of municipal bonds ==
The basic types of municipal bonds are:

- General obligation bonds: Principal and interest are secured by the full faith and credit of the issuer and usually supported by either the issuer's unlimited or limited taxing power. These bonds are usually considered the most secure type of municipal bond, and therefore carry the lowest interest rate. In many cases, general obligation bonds require voter approval to levy the tax required for repayment. Bond financing is usually used to finance capital investments (such as a new public safety center), not current operating expenditures.
  - Assessment bonds promise repayment based on property tax assessments of properties located within the issuer's boundaries. These are generally considered a form of general obligation bond, in that if the assessments fail to provide the required revenue for payment, the government is still obligated to redeem the bonds in full with interest.
- Revenue bonds promise to repay principal and interest from a specified stream of future income, such as income generated by a water utility from payments by customers. Other public projects financed by revenue bonds include toll roads, bridges, airports, water and sewage treatment facilities, hospitals and subsidized housing.

== Traditional issuance process ==
Depending on the jurisdiction and the basis for issuing the bond, voter approval may be required, especially if a property tax levy is involved. Some bonds, for minor projects or emergency situations, may be issued without voter pre-approval. But in all cases, public input (whether a vote, or the opportunity to speak for or against issuance at a public hearing) is required.

Voter approval of the bond proposal does not automatically result in the bonds being issued. Frequently, bonds under a proposal are issued in series over a period of time, in order to allow contractors a steady stream of work and the jurisdiction to not be overwhelmed in managing too many projects at once.

Before a particular municipal bond is offered to the public, the issuer must publish an "official statement" disclosing material information about the offering. Key players in the issuance process include:

- Municipal advisor: serves as a fiduciary for the municipal issue, taking care of all of the assets and finances involved in the issuance process. The advisor is legally obligated to represent the interests of the issuer and serve as a source of financial advice.
- Bond counsel: verifies the legal aspects of the issuance and opines as to whether an issuance is exempt from state or federal taxes.
- Securities underwriter: manages the distribution of the bonds to investors through brokers.

Tax regulations generally require all money raised by a municipal bond sale to be spent on capital projects within three to five years of issuance.

== Characteristics of municipal bonds ==
=== Taxability ===
In the United States, although not all municipal bonds are tax-exempt, most are. Tax-exempt securities represented about 80% of trading volume in U.S. municipal bonds in 2020. Interest income from most municipal bonds is excludable from gross income for federal income tax purposes, and may be exempt from state income tax as well, depending on the applicable state laws. Internal Revenue Code section 103(a) is the statutory provision that excludes interest on municipal bonds from federal income tax. As of 2004, other rules, however, such as those pertaining to private activity bonds, are found in sections 141–150, 1394, 1400, 7871.

The state and local exemption was the subject of litigation in Department of Revenue of Kentucky v. Davis.

Bonds issued for certain purposes are subject to the alternative minimum tax as an item of tax preference.

=== Coupon rates ===
Municipal bonds' coupon rates are generally lower than those of comparable corporate bonds, but higher than those of their FDIC-insured counterparts: CDs, savings accounts, money market accounts, and others.

=== Liquidity ===
Historically, municipal bonds have been one of the least liquid assets on the market. One indicator of this is their infrequent trading. Municipal bonds are actively traded in a "when issued" market, and also immediately after they are issued. Once the bonds find their way into retail and mutual fund portfolios, the volume of trade drops off dramatically. The MSRB reports that from March 1998 to May 1999, 71% of the outstanding issues did not trade at all. A 2005 study concluded that 4–6 months after issuance, less than 10% of the sampled bonds traded at all; the probability then rises somewhat so that by four years from issuance, roughly 15% of the bonds in the sample traded at least once during a given month. A 2007 study concluded that the average investment grade tax exempt 1-10 year municipal bond traded 21 times over its 11-year sample and 5.65% of issues only traded once.

Unlike corporate and Treasury bonds, which are more likely to be held by institutional investors, municipal bond owners are more diverse, and hence harder to locate, giving this market less liquidity. Compared to stocks, municipal bonds are much harder to maneuver. At the same time, the minimum investment amounts for stocks are typically <$500 and about $1000 for CDs and money markets; in comparison, municipal bonds typically have minimum denomination buy-ins of $5000 but smaller issuers may have buy-ins of $1000 to incentivize local or regional investors. An investor's overall principal cost may be lower than the $5000 minimum denomination by purchasing the bonds at a discount.

While minimum denominations contribute to illiquidity, another such reason is the total amount of municipal bonds outstanding. There are over 1,500,000 individual municipal CUSIPs representing over 50,000 issuers. To put this into context, there are ~4300 US domestically incorporated exchange-listed stocks and 10,500 stocks that trade over-the-counter.

Over the last decade, technology solutions have been applied to make the market more responsive to investors, more financially transparent and ultimately easier for issuers and buyers. The emergence of small denomination municipal bonds makes the muni market more accessible to middle-income buyers. It is believed that these initiatives will reduce lower debt issuance costs.

=== Default risk, credit ratings and insurance ===
Default risk is a measure of the possibility that the issuer will fail to make all interest and principal payments, on time and in full. It is among the risks evaluated by a rating agency, which assigns a credit rating to the bond. Credit ratings are generally the starting point buyers use when deciding how much to pay for a municipal bond.

Historical default rates have been lower in the municipal sector than in the corporate market. This may be due in part to the fact that some municipals are backed by state and local government power to tax, or revenue from public utilities. However, sharp drops in property valuations (as in the 2009 mortgage crisis) can strain state and local finances, potentially creating municipal defaults. Harrisburg, PA, when faced with falling revenues, skipped several bond payments on a municipal waste to energy incinerator. The prospect of municipal bankruptcy was raised by the Controller of Harrisburg, although it was opposed by Harrisburg's mayor.

Default risk to the investor can be greatly reduced through municipal bond insurance, which promises to pay interest and principal if the issuer does not do so.

== Return analysis ==
Projecting the yield to maturity on municipal bonds usually involves incorporating tax brackets.

=== Comparison to taxable bonds ===
Comparing the yield on a municipal bond to that of a corporate or U.S. Treasury bond can be misleading, because of differing tax treatment of the income from the two types of securities. For that reason, investors use the concept of taxable equivalent yield to compare municipal and corporate or Treasury bonds. The taxable equivalent yield on a municipal bond is calculated as follows. Where r_{m} = interest rate of municipal bond, r_{c} = interest rate of comparable corporate bond and t = investor's tax bracket (also known as marginal tax rate):

$$r_c = \frac{r_m}{( 1 - t )}$$

For example, assume an investor in the 38% tax bracket is offered a municipal bond that has a tax-exempt yield of 1.0%. Using the formula above, the municipal bond's taxable equivalent yield is 1.6% (0.01/(1-0.38) = 0.016) - a figure which can be fairly compared to yields on taxable investments such as corporate or U.S. Treasury bonds for decision making purposes.

Typically, investors in the highest tax brackets benefit from buying tax-exempt municipal bonds instead of taxable corporate bonds, but those in the lowest tax brackets may be better off buying corporate bonds and paying the taxes. Investors in higher tax brackets may arbitrage municipal bonds against corporate bonds using a strategy called municipal bond arbitrage.

== Statutory regulation ==
The U.S. Supreme Court held in Pollock v. Farmers' Loan & Trust Co. (1895) that the federal government had no power under the U.S. Constitution to tax interest on municipal bonds, but in South Carolina v. Baker (1988), the Supreme Court held the Congress could tax interest income on municipal bonds if it so desired on the basis that tax exemption of municipal bonds is not protected by the Constitution. In this case, the Supreme Court stated that the contrary decision of the Court in Pollock had been "effectively overruled by subsequent case law".

The Revenue Act of 1913 first codified exemption of interest on municipal bonds from federal income tax.

The Tax Reform Act of 1986 greatly reduced private activities that may be financed with tax-exempt bond proceeds.

== In other countries ==
The United Kingdom's UK Municipal Bonds Agency (UK MBA) provides services for borrowing by municipalities. Canada has CIBC.

Municipal bonds agencies, also known as bond banks or local government funding agencies, exist in other countries, such as Sweden and Finland. In New Zealand, the Local Government Funding Agency (LGFA), is the second-biggest issuer of New Zealand–dollar debt behind the government.

Local governments in China were not permitted to issue bonds in the open market until 2015, and historically these governments relied on local government financing vehicles as a major source of debt finance. By the end of 2022 a total of CN¥35.1 trillion of bonds were outstanding. In India, the Bangalore City Corporation was the first municipal government to issue bonds in November 1997, followed by the Ahmedabad City Corporation in February 1998.

== See also ==
- Build America Bonds
- S&P Municipal Bond Index
