= ICA Banken =

Swedish bank

- Company type: Private
- Industry: Bank
- Founded: 2001; 25 years ago
- Headquarters: Sweden
- Key people: Marie Halling, MD
- Products: Banking
- Services: Financing|Insurance
- Number of employees: 750 (ICA Banken and ICA Försäkring)
- Website: website

ICA Banken AB is a Swedish retail bank and a wholly owned subsidiary of ICA Gruppen AB, one of Sweden's largest retail groups with a primary focus on food and health. The bank was established in 2001 and formally began operations in February 2002. ICA Banken provides a broad range of financial services to private individuals and corporate customers in Sweden and operates under the supervision of the Swedish Financial Supervisory Authority (Finansinspektionen). It is one of the 20 biggest banks in Sweden.

== History and background ==
ICA Banken was founded as part of ICA Gruppen's strategy to expand beyond traditional grocery retail into complementary services that support customer loyalty and everyday financial needs. The bank began its operations in 2001 and launched to the public in early 2002.

From its inception, ICA Banken has been positioned as a so‑called “supermarket bank,” integrating banking services with the ICA retail ecosystem. The establishment of ICA Banken followed a broader trend in the Nordic region where large retail groups launched banking operations to offer payment solutions, savings products, and credit services to existing customer bases.

According to ICA Gruppen, the bank was created to simplify household finances for ICA customers while also reducing transaction costs related to external banking and card services within ICA's retail operations.

== Ownership and corporate structure ==
ICA Banken is owned by ICA Gruppen AB, a Swedish retail group founded in 1938. ICA Gruppen operates across several business segments, including grocery retail (ICA Sweden), pharmacy services (Apotek Hjärtat), real estate (ICA Fastigheter), and financial services (ICA Banken).

ICA Banken forms part of the group's financial services segment and also includes the insurance subsidiary ICA Försäkring (ICA Insurance), which operates under ICA Banken's ownership structure.

== Operations and services ==
ICA Banken offers a comprehensive range of retail banking services for private individuals, including payment and transaction accounts, debit and credit cards, savings and investment accounts, consumer loans, and mortgage lending.

In addition to private customer services, ICA Banken provides payment services and financial solutions for ICA retailers, ICA Gruppen companies, and selected public‑sector entities, including municipalities.

The bank primarily operates through digital channels such as online banking platforms and mobile applications, supported by customer service via telephone. Certain selected banking services are also available through ICA retail stores in Sweden, reflecting the bank's close integration with the ICA retail network.

== See also ==
- List of banks in Sweden
