= Maine Municipal Bond Bank =

The Maine Municipal Bond Bank is a Local Government Funding Agency created in 1973 to issue bonds, enabling it to lend to counties, municipalities, school districts, utility districts and other government organizations within the state of Maine. The sale of tax-exempt bonds with the Bank's high credit rating allows these capital project loans to be issued at lower interest rates than would otherwise be available. It was established by the Maine Municipal Bond Bank Act.
