= New Zealand Local Government Funding Agency =

Crown-backed municipal bond aggregator

Local Government Funding Agency
- Type: Limited liability company (Council-controlled organisation)
- Industry: Financial services
- Founded: December 2011; 14 years ago
- Area served: New Zealand
- Key people: Mark Butcher (CEO)
- Owner: 30 Local Councils (80%); New Zealand Government (20%)

The New Zealand Local Government Funding Agency or Local Government Funding Agency (LGFA) is a local government funding agency established in New Zealand on 1 December 2011, as a limited liability company, following the enactment of the Local Government Borrowing Act 2011. The LGFA raises funds by issuing bonds on the NZX Debt Market, then on-lends that capital to local councils.
