= UK Municipal Bonds Agency =

Government agency to facilities borrowing by Local Authorities

- Company type: Public Limited Company
- Industry: Finance
- Founded: 2014
- Headquarters: London, United Kingdom
- Area served: United Kingdom
- Key people: Sir Merrick Cockell, Sir Stephen Houghton
- Services: Bonds
- Website: www.ukmba.org

The UK Municipal Bonds Agency (UK MBA) is Local Government Funding Agency that exists primarily to reduce councils' capital long term financing costs in the United Kingdom. It allows local authorities to diversify funding sources and borrow at a lower cost than is available from Central Government via the Public Works Loan Board of the UK Debt Management Office, which is part of HM Treasury. The agency will sell municipal bonds on the capital markets, raising funds that it will then lend to councils.

== History ==
The UK MBA was founded in 2014. It was founded by, is owned by and lends to Local Authorities within the United Kingdom.

As of January 2016, 56 local authorities as well as the LGA and the Greater Manchester Combined Authority, have signed up as shareholders in the UK Municipal Bonds Agency.

Shortly before December 2015, a framework document setting out the working of the UK MBA was also distributed to councils with Cambridgeshire County Council becoming the first local authority to approve it in early February 2016.

In October 2019, PFM Financial Advisors LLC were appointed as the managed service provider to the UK Municipal Bonds Agency.

== Purpose ==
The UK Municipal Bonds Agency provides councils with lower borrowing costs. The goal of the UK MBA is to lower costs for council taxpayers and provide value for money for councils, via the public bonds market. The UK MBA will issue bonds backed by joint and several guarantees of the authorities involved.

== Key People ==
The Chairman of the UKMBA is Sir Merrick Cockell, who was previously head of the Local Government Association.

The Vice Chairman of the UKMBA is Adrian Bell, who also heads up JCRA's Canaccord Genuity team.

Formerly the Chief Executive of UKMBA was Aidan Brady, previously a Chief Operating Officer at Deutsche Bank, an investment bank. In October 2019, Aidan Brady stepped down from his role at the UKMBA.

In January 2016 the UKMBA announced the appointment of four key non-executive appointments and converted to a public limited company (Plc) as it prepares for launch.

Sir Stephen Houghton, leader of Barnsley Metropolitan Borough Council and chair of Sheffield City Region Combined Authority, has been appointed senior independent director.

Other appointments include Derrick Anderson, former chief executive of Lambeth and Wolverhampton councils; Mridul Hegde, a former director of public spending at the Treasury; and Melanie McLaren, executive director of codes and standards of the Financial Reporting Council. Mridul Hegde and Melanie McLaren stepped down from their roles at the UKMBA in 2019 (Mridul) and 2018 (Melanie).

== Other Countries ==
Municipal bonds agencies also known as Bond banks or Local government funding agencies exist in other countries, such as Sweden and Finland. In New Zealand, the Local Government Funding Agency (LGFA), is the second-biggest issuer of New Zealand-dollar debt behind the government.
