= Kommuninvest =

Kommuninvest is a Swedish Local Government Funding Agency that was set up in 1986 by Lars Andersson, former finance officer of the municipality of Örebro, Sweden. The scheme aims to help municipal governments to raise capital through the issuance of bonds in Europe, Japan and other countries.

As a single municipality has little ability to raise capital alone, the Kommuninvest scheme allows many to issue a bond together. As the local governments in Sweden are allowed to alter local taxes when needed, the ability to repay any outstanding debt is close to risk-free, as such the Kommuninvest scheme is rated AAA by both Standard & Poor's and Moody's. This high rating has allowed it to attract investors from around the globe, with roughly US$5billion having been issued in bonds so far.

Bonds are issued in Europe and in Japan under the form of Uridashi bonds (bonds issued by foreign entities in the Japanese market in non JPY currencies that can be sold to Japanese retail investors). Kommuninvest does not currently issue any bonds in the US due to tight regulatory guidelines.
