= Resurs Holding =

Swedish financial services company

Resurs Holding logo

Resurs Bank logo

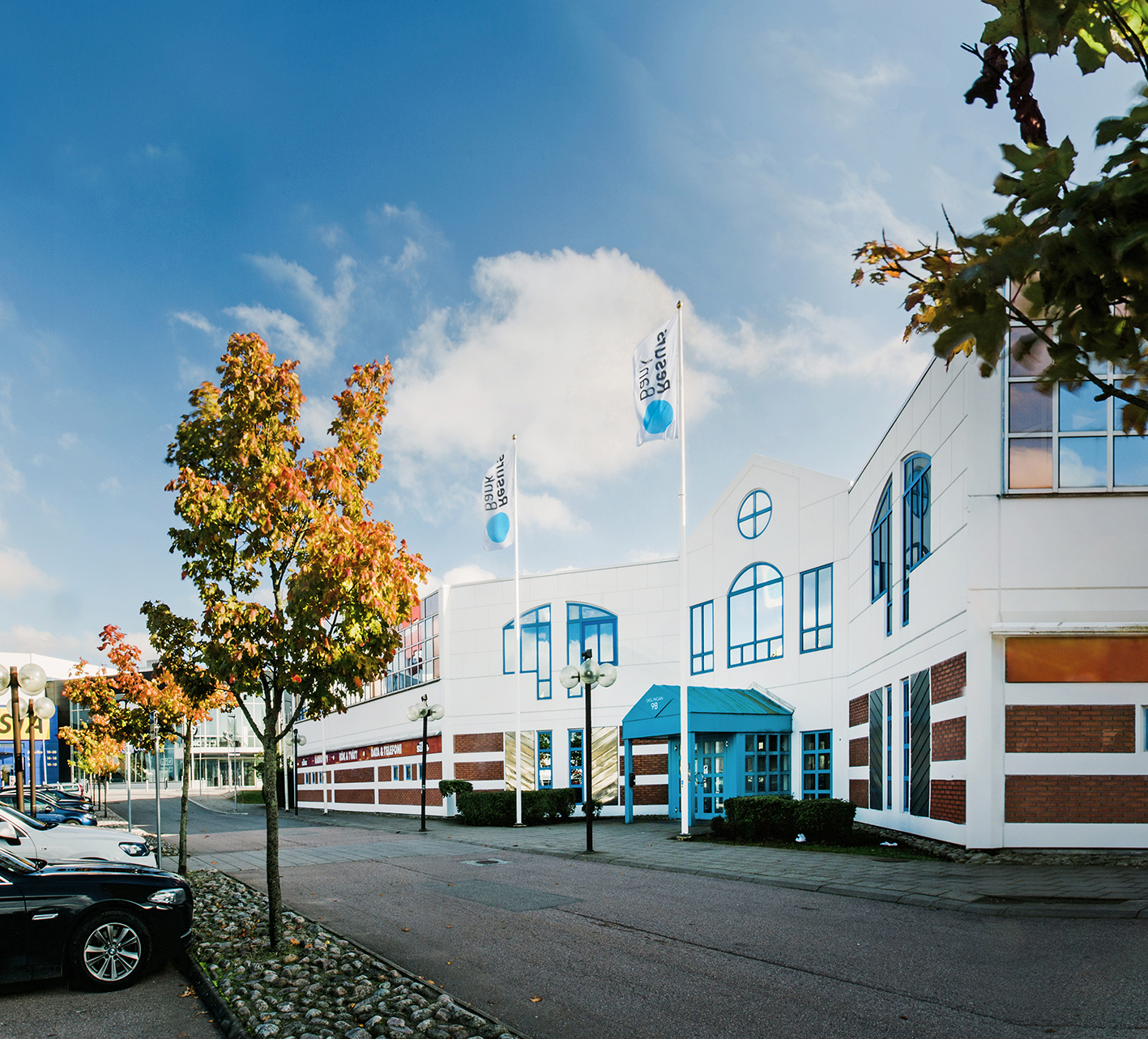
Head Office Resurs Bank in Helsingborg, Sweden

Resurs Holding AB is a Swedish financial services company founded in October 2001.

The birth of Resurs Radio & TV goes back to 1977 and Resurs Finans was founded in 1983. Resurs Bank is specialised in consumer credits, unsecured loans and issues credit cards. Among a large amount of retail-customers, companies such as Siba, Bauhaus, Net On Net, Sova, Ticket, BMW and Mio use retail financing from Resurs Bank. Resurs Bank is part of The Resurs Group, which operates through subsidiaries Resurs Bank and Solid Försäkring.

Since its start in 1977, Resurs has established collaborations with over 1,200 retail partners and 35,000 stores and built a customer base of approximately 5 million private customers in the Nordics. Resurs Holding, with operations in Sweden, Denmark, Norway and Finland, had around 706 employees and a loan portfolio of approximately SEK 18 billion at year-end 2015.

Resurs Bank has had a bank charter since 2001 and is under the supervision of the Swedish Financial Supervisory Authority. Ownership Resurs Holding: 28.94% Waldir AB.

== See also ==
- List of banks in Sweden
