= Westra =

Westra is a toponymic surname of West Frisian origin, approximately meaning "from the West". People with the name include:

- Ans Westra (1936–2023), Dutch-born New Zealand photographer
- Berry Westra (born 1961), Dutch bridge player
- Lieuwe Westra (1982–2023), Dutch racing cyclist
- Steven Westra (born 1969), American politician from South Dakota
- Willem Westra van Holthe (born 1948), New Zealand-born Australian politician
- Willy Westra van Holthe (1888–1965), Dutch football player

== See also ==
- Westray, one of the Orkney Islands
- Westra nigra, parasitoid wasp of the family Pteromalidae
- Burgh Westra, Virginia State historic home, named after the Scottish phrase for "Village of the West"
- FPV Westra, former Scottish patrol boat, now MY Steve Irwin, flagship of the Sea Shepherd Conservation Society
- Westra Wermlands Sparbank, Swedish savings bank
