= SBAB =

SBAB Bank AB (publ)
- Company type: Public limited company (publ)
- Industry: Banking and Financial services
- Founded: 1985
- Headquarters: Stockholm Municipality, Sweden
- Area served: Sweden
- Key people: Jan Sinclair (Chairman); Mikael Inglander (CEO)
- Revenue: 5.37 billion SEK (2024)
- Net income: 2.90 billion SEK (2024)
- Total assets: 537.8 billion SEK (2024)
- Total equity: 26 billion SEK (2024)
- Owner: Government of Sweden
- Website: sbab.se

SBAB Bank AB (publ), known as SBAB, is a major Swedish government-owned bank, operating primarily in the domestic mortgage and savings market. Since its foundation in 1985, SBAB has grown into one of Sweden's leading mortgage institutions. SBAB’s profit distributed to the Swedish state for 2024 amounted to 913 million SEK (approximately €82 million).

== History ==
SBAB was established on 1 July 1985 as Statens Bostadsfinansieringsaktiebolag (lit. 'The State Housing Finance Company'), with a mandate to finance government housing loans previously funded through Sweden's national budget.

In 1989, after market deregulation, SBAB entered international capital markets, including Tokyo and London.

Starting in 1991, it became a competitive lender in the Swedish private mortgage market and expanded its product range over the following decades.

By 2010 SBAB had secured a full banking license from the Swedish Financial Supervisory Authority, allowing it to offer deposit accounts as well as retail loans.

SBAB issued Sweden’s first covered bonds in 2006 via AB Sveriges Säkerställda Obligationer (SCBC), and has since continuously diversified its funding base.

The bank also owns a majority stake in Booli, a leading real estate data and listing platform.

== Activities ==
SBAB’s core business is in mortgage and consumer lending for private individuals and credit provision for housing cooperatives and property companies. It also operates a well-regarded savings platform, with popular fixed-term and regular deposit products. The bank is recognized for its work on sustainability and transparency, and has launched numerous green lending and savings solutions targeting energy efficiency and environmental standards in housing.

SBAB regularly appears in independent national rankings for high customer trust and satisfaction, as measured by the Swedish Quality Index.

== Structure and subsidiaries ==
SBAB's headquarters are in Stockholm Municipality with offices in Karlstad, Gothenburg, and Malmö. It is wholly owned by the State of Sweden and subject to the corporate governance rules applicable to state-owned enterprises.

Key subsidiaries include:

- AB Sveriges Säkerställda Obligationer (SCBC), the covered bond issuer
- Booli Search Technologies AB (real estate data and listings)

== Financial performance ==
In 2024, SBAB reported lending of 537.8 billion SEK and a net profit of 2.90 billion SEK, among the highest results in its peer group, despite a slower national real estate market. It maintained a Common Equity Tier 1 ratio of 12.7% and proposed a state dividend of 913 million SEK.

Sector watchers and consumer groups have repeatedly described SBAB as having the highest trust index among Swedish banks over the past decade.

== Corporate governance ==
Owned 100% by the Swedish government, SBAB’s board is led by Jan Sinclair (chair since 2019) and CEO Mikael Inglander (since 2022). The bank operates with a prominent focus on sustainable business practices and public accountability.

== See also ==
- Covered bond
- List of banks in Sweden
- Government-owned corporation
