= Tetrameranthus globuliferus =

Conservation status
- Vulnerable (IUCN 3.1)

Scientific classification
- Kingdom: Plantae
- Clade: Embryophytes
- Clade: Tracheophytes
- Clade: Spermatophytes
- Clade: Angiosperms
- Clade: Magnoliids
- Order: Magnoliales
- Family: Annonaceae
- Genus: Tetrameranthus
- Species: T. globuliferus

Binomial name
- Tetrameranthus globuliferus Westra

Species of flowering plant

Tetrameranthus globuliferus is a species of plant in the Annonaceae family. It is endemic to Ecuador. Its natural habitat is subtropical or tropical moist lowland forests.
