= Ikano Bank =

Swedish bank

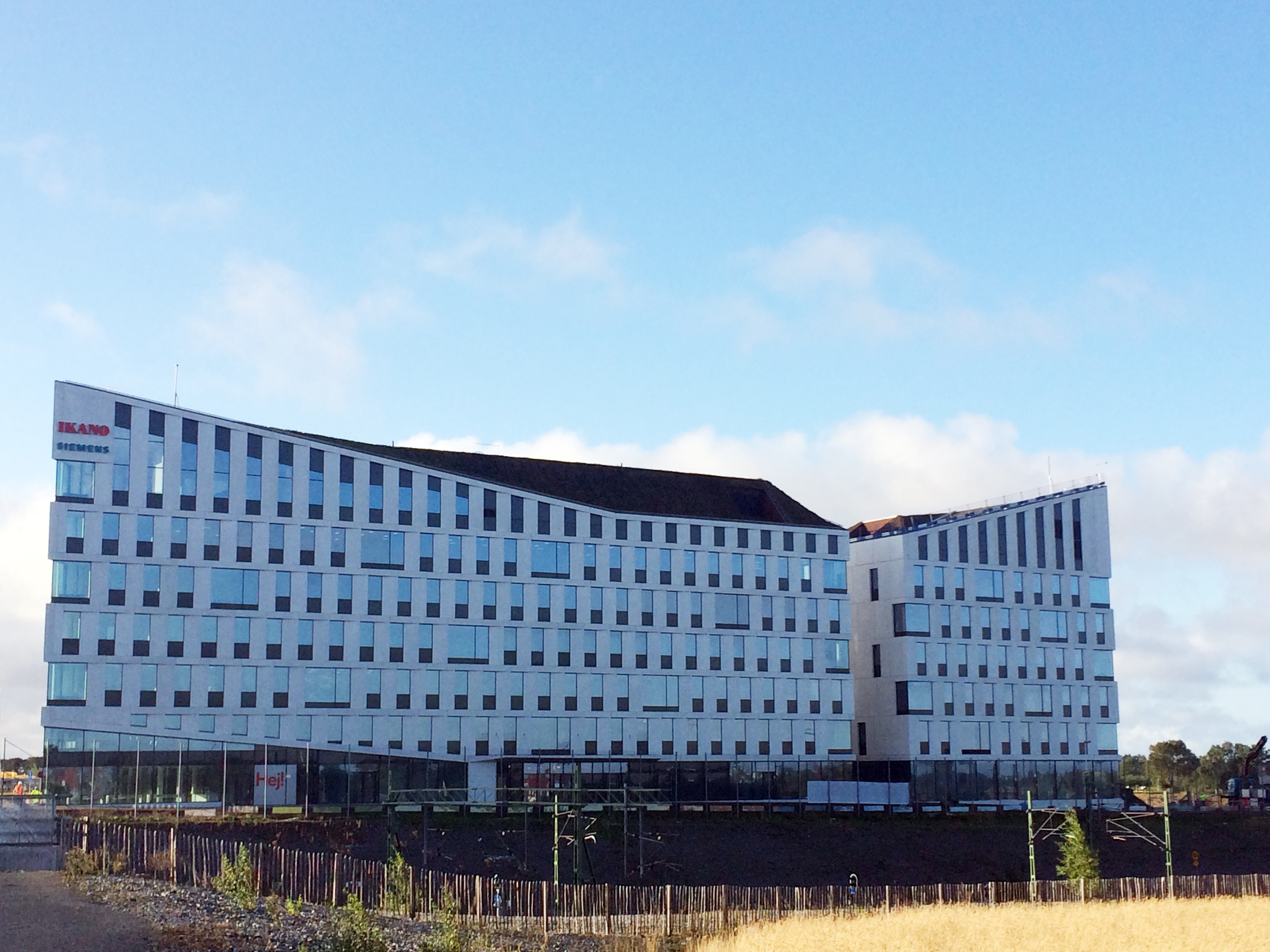
- Headquarters of Ikano Bank in Malmö, Sweden, Europe.
- Formerly: Ikanobanken
- Type: Public
- Industry: Retail banking
- Founded: 1995 (31 years ago) in Älmhult, Sweden
- Founder: Ingvar Kamprad
- Headquarters: Malmö, Sweden
- Number of locations: 8 offices located in the Nordics, UK, Germany and Poland.
- Area served: Europe
- Services: Ikano Bank offers savings and loan products for consumers, sales support services for retailers, and leasing and factoring solutions for businesses.
- Owner: Ingka Group
- Number of employees: 900
- Parent: Ingka Investments; (2024–present)
- Website: ikanobank.se

Ikano Bank was established in 1995 and is founded by Ingvar Kamprad (the founder of IKEA). It offers savings and loan products for consumers, sales finance support for retailers including IKEA, and leasing and factoring solutions for businesses.

Ikano Bank has its head office in Malmö, with offices in Sundbyberg, Asker, Glostrup, Nottingham, Wiesbaden, Warsaw, and Helsinki.

== History ==
In 1995, Ingvar Kamprad (the founder of IKEA) started Ikanobanken, with one branch office in Älmhult, Sweden. Fifteen years later, Ikanobanken became Ikano Bank, merging with other entities within the Ikano Group.

Until 2024, it was owned by its founder's family through Ikano, a group of businesses which also includes insurance, retail, and real estate in many countries. Minority partner, Ingka Investments completed the acquisition of full control of Ikano Bank in 2024.

== See also ==
- List of banks in Sweden
