= Hoist Finance =

Swedish financial services company

Hoist Finance AB (Publ)
- Trade name: Hoist Finance
- Company type: Public (Aktiebolag)
- Traded as: Nasdaq Stockholm: HOFI
- Industry: Financial services
- Founded: 1994
- Headquarters: Stockholm, Sweden
- Number of locations: 14 European markets (2026)
- Area served: Europe
- Key people: Lars Wollung (Chairman); Harry Vranjes (CEO)
- Services: Debt buyer; NPL
- AUM: SEK 34.4 billion (Q1 2026)
- Number of employees: 1,035 (Q1 2026)
- Parent: Hoist International AB (Publ)
- Website: hoistfinance.com

Hoist Finance is a Swedish financial services company and debt buyer specialized in acquiring and managing non-performing loans (NPLs). The company purchases debt portfolios from international banks and financial institutions, and operates in multiple European markets. Headquartered in Stockholm, the company's shares are publicly traded on the Nasdaq Stockholm exchange.

== Operations ==
As of Q1 2026, Hoist Finance operates in 14 countries across Europe, employs 1,035 people, and manages an investment portfolio valued at approximately SEK 34.4 billion. In February 2026, the company officially qualified as a Specialised Debt Restructurer (SDR) under European Capital Requirements Regulation, allowing the firm to acquire non-performing loan portfolios without standard backstop capital deduction restrictions.

== See also ==
- List of banks in Belgium
- List of banks in Sweden
