= JAK Members Bank =

Swedisih cooperative bank

JAK Medlemsbank
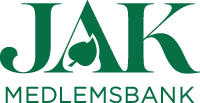
- Type: Financial institution
- Industry: Financial services
- Founded: 1965 (association); 1997 (banking license)
- Headquarters: Skövde, Sweden
- Key people: Maria Bolin (CEO)
- AUM: SEK 89, 420 million (2014)
- Number of employees: 30 (2015)
- Website: jak.se

The JAK Members Bank, or JAK Medlemsbank, is a cooperative, member-owned financial institution based in Skövde, Sweden, and based on a concept that arose in Denmark in 1931. JAK is an acronym for Jord Arbete Kapital in Swedish or Land Labour Capital, the factors of production in classical economics. A membership of approximately 39,000 (as of December 2015) dictates the Bank's policies and direction. The Board of Directors is elected annually by members, who are each allowed only one share in the bank. All of the bank's activities occur outside of the capital market as its loans are financed solely by member savings. Administrative and developmental costs are paid for by membership and loans.

JAK banking employs the "Saving Points" system: members accumulate Saving Points during saving periods and use them when applying for a loan. The concept is that one is allowed to take out a loan for oneself to the same extent as one allows other people to be granted loans, saving into one's account. For this reason (applying for a loan), earned Saving Points must be equal to spent Saving Points to ensure sustainability. If a member is borrowing more saving points than they currently possess, they are obliged to continue accumulating "aftersavings" during the repayment period. Aftersavings are a fixed quota of money that a member must save after one's loan was made, so they can continue to earn Saving Points. This way, at the end of the repayment period, Saving Points earned will be equal to Saving Points spent, and at that time they will be able to have back all their aftersavings.

JAK also offers a couple of loans where you do not need any saving points.

== History ==
The co-operative society Jord Arbejde Kapital was founded in Denmark during the Great Depression in 1931. The society issued a popular local currency which was subsequently outlawed by the Danish government in 1933. In 1934 it founded an interest-free savings and loan system and a Local Exchange Trading System. Though both systems were forced to close, the savings and loan system re-emerged in 1944. The experience of JAK-banking in Denmark inspired a group in Sweden to develop a non-profit organisation named Jord Arbete Kapital - Riksförening för Ekonomisk Frigörelse (National Association for Economic Emancipation) in 1965. This pioneers' group developed a mathematical system based on Saving Points, designated the "balanced saving system". The association grew slowly at first. In 1997, a legislative amendment required the association to receive a banking license from the Swedish Financial Supervisory Authority in order to continue operating as a financial institution, which was granted in that year. The bank's deposits are insured by the government.

== Philosophy ==
According to JAK's philosophy, economic instability arises out of and is a consequence of the levying of interest.

JAK operates under the following principles:

- Interest moves money from the poor to the rich
- Interest favours projects which yield high profits in the short term

The main aim of the bank is to provide its members with a viable, feasible financial instrument, sustainable for the environment and serving the local economy.

== Membership ==
Marketing for JAK is done primarily by volunteers and word-of-mouth advertising. Deposits are accepted and loans are given in Swedish Krona (SEK). Mortgages or personal guarantees may be made only if the property or the guarantor is Swedish. It is compulsory to have Swedish residency to apply for a loan from JAK. The savings of members are covered under the deposit guarantees of the Swedish banking system.

== Konsumentverket versus JAK Members Bank ==
In 2017, Konsumentverket sued JAK Members Bank for misleading its customers, alleging that the banks claims of interest-free loans were false and misleading. Swedish court sided with Konsumentverket and banned JAK Members Bank from calling its loans "interest-free".

== Inaccessible customer funds ==
In early 2024, Dagens Nyheter reported that thousands of bank's customers could not withdraw their money. Some customers have not received their withdrawals after more than 7 years of waiting. The bank is unable to fulfil withdrawals without going under.

== JAK in other countries ==
JAK organisations exist in Denmark, Germany and Italy, in addition to Sweden. There was also an earlier attempt to start such a bank in Norway.

The Danish organisations, which date back to 1931, are known as J.A.K. Andelskasser, and there are 14 independent organisations which hold the legal status of andelskasse, which is a form of bank in Denmark. They are all members of Landsforeningen J.A.K., the association of JAK organisations.

== Literature ==
- Margunn Bjørnholt: Pengene mot strømmen: Alternative finansieringsorganisasjoner, Oslo, University of Oslo, 1995, ISBN 8257004383, sida 82-129

== See also ==
- Grameen Bank
- WIR Bank
- List of European cooperative banks
- List of banks in Sweden
