= Kommunalbanken =

Kommunalbanken AS (KBN)
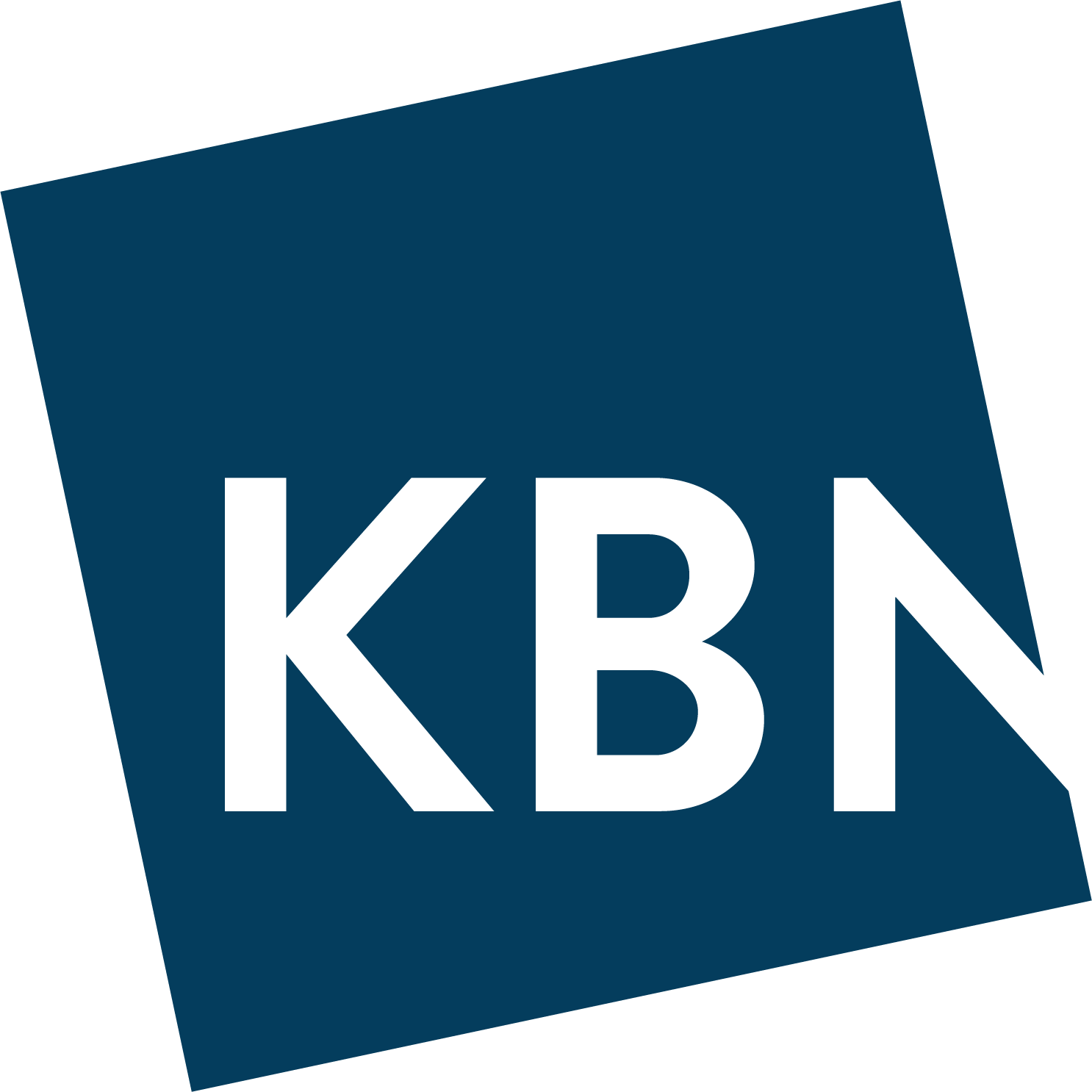
- Company type: Private
- Industry: Financial services
- Founded: 1927
- Headquarters: Oslo, Norway
- Area served: Norway
- Products: Loans
- Number of employees: 89 (2023)
- Website: http://www.kbn.com

The Norwegian Agency for Local Governments (Norwegian: Kommunalbanken, short KBN) is a local government funding agency 100 percent owned by the Royal Ministry of Local Government and Regional Development on behalf of the Kingdom of Norway. KBN is a direct continuation of its predecessor, Norges Kommunalbank, and has for 85 years been the primary provider of loans to the local government sector in Norway.

With an AAA/ Aaa credit rating, KBN was established by an act of Parliament in 1926 as a state administrative body and started operations in 1927. KBN gained its current status and structure through a conversion act in 1999. Today, KBN is defined as a state instrumentality serving a public policy function of providing low-cost funding to Norwegian municipalities. The agency’s mandate also includes promoting competition in the market, thereby facilitating the efficient provision of public services in Norway. KBN operations are strictly regulated, and the agency may only lend to Norwegian local governments, counties, and inter-municipal companies against a local government guarantee.

KBN is the largest provider of loans to local authorities in Norway, commanding a market share of approximately 50 percent. As of 2011, more than 97 percent of municipalities and counties have loans with KBN.
