= Local government funding agency =

A local government funding agency (LGFA) or bond bank, or other terms, is financial institution that serves as a vehicle for local government authorities such as municipalities, county councils and regions to access capital markets for the purpose of jointly procuring credit for public investment projects. The local and/or regional authorities of a country or state typically own the LGFA, sometimes with a minor ownership by the state.

It works as a co-operative agency where the participating authorities come together in order to ensure lower interests rates on loans, based on the creditworthiness of the participating members. This co-operation can also help the local authorities to achieve a higher credit rating than if they act independently. The agency normally does not seek to make profits and any surplus is usually reinvested in the activities. LGFAs exist and operate within the borders of the respective countries where they are found.

== LGFAs by country ==
- Canada (Municipal Authority of British Columbia, 1970)
- Denmark (KommuneKredit, 1898)
- Finland (Municipality Finance, 1989)
- France (Agence France Locale, 2013)
- Italy (Cassa del Trentino, 2005)
- Netherlands (Bank Nederlandse Gemeenten, 1914, Nederlandse Waterschapsbank, 1954)
- New Zealand (New Zealand Local Government Funding Agency, 2009)
- Norway (Kommunalbanken, 1927), n.b. owned by the state.
- Sweden (Kommuninvest, 1986)
- Switzerland (Emissionszentrale der Schweizer Gemeinden, 1971)
- United Kingdom (Public Works Loan Board, 1793, UK Municipal Bonds Agency, 2014)
- United States of America (various municipal bondbanks such as: Vermont Municipal Bond Bank, 1970; Maine Municipal Bond Bank; Sunshine State Governmental Financing Commission, 1985; and others)
