= Westra Wermlands Sparbank =

- Industry: Financial services
- Founded: 1856
- Headquarters: Vastra Torggatan 1, 671 21 Arvika, Sweden
- Key people: Karl Håkan Nordblad (CEO)
- Number of employees: over 100
- Website: www.wwsparbank.se

Westra Wermlands Sparbank is a savings bank providing services in Värmland County. The bank is subject to the Bank Act and is independent, but has a close coroparation with Swedbank.

Its business area includes Arvika (headquarters), Eda and Årjäng municipalities serving via seven offices. The bank has over 100 employees and is an active member of the Savings Banks Association.

The Westra Wermlands Sparbank was founded in Arvika in 1856.

== See also ==
- List of banks in Sweden
