= Nederlandse Waterschapsbank =

Dutch specialist financial institution

Nederlandse Waterschapsbank NV
- Company type: Private
- Industry: Financial services
- Founded: 1954
- Founder: Unie van Waterschapsbonden (Water board union)
- Headquarters: The Hague, Netherlands
- Key people: Lidwin van Velden (CEO)
- Products: Financing for public organisations
- Number of employees: 131 (2023)
- Website: NWB Bank.com

The Nederlandse Waterschapsbank (NWB Bank) (English: Netherlands water boards bank) is a Dutch specialist financial institution that provides financing to water boards and the wider Dutch public sector which includes among others municipalities, drinking water companies, healthcare institutions and housing associations. The bank also finances public private partnerships and renewable energy projects. It is a Local Government Funding Agency owned by the Dutch Water boards, Dutch government and provinces. It has been using the trading name NWB Bank since 2009.

Although a registered bank, it does not provide any services to individuals or companies and focuses solely on the financing of the Dutch (semi-)public sector. NWB has been designated as a Significant Institution since the entry into force of European Banking Supervision in late 2014, and as a consequence is directly supervised by the European Central Bank.

== History ==
Starting in the 1950s, the water board union regularly lent money to the individual Water Boards. However, the union was not well equipped to handle the banking and lending activities and on 19 December 1952 it decided to set up a separate water board bank to handle this task. The bank would raise risk less capital from the water boards and later other government organisations and lend this out to the water boards as required. The main aim was to provide the cheapest possible source of funding for the government entities.

The disaster caused by the North Sea flood of 1953 sped up the development of the bank and on 5 May 1954 the bank was established as Limited company by the 142 water boards of the Netherlands.

The bank is wholly owned by a diverse set of Dutch government entities and only the Dutch state and local entities may be shareholders in the bank. 81% of the shares are held by the Dutch water boards, 17% by the Dutch government and 2% by the provinces.

== Activities ==
The NWB Bank provides credit to local authorities, provinces, public institutions in the area of public housing, public health services and education and for water and environmental projects.

The bank raises funds on the international money and capital markets on the basis of a very strong balance sheet and high credit rating. The Nederlandse Waterschapsbank has a Triple A rating from Moody's and Standard & Poor's (2024) and was placed 6th in the Global Finance's worlds 50th safest banks in 2023.

As the banks customers are government entities with very high credit ratings the risk of default is very low, as of 2023 it had a very high Basel tier 1 ratio of 48%.

== See also ==
- List of banks in the euro area
- List of banks in the Netherlands
