= Jaks =

Jaks, Jåks or Jakš is a surname. Notable people with the surname include:

- Iver Jåks (1932–2007), Sami Norwegian artist
- Jānis Jaks (born 1995), Latvian ice hockey player
- Martin Jakš (born 1986), Czech cross country skier
- Pauli Jaks (born 1972), Swiss retired ice hockey goaltender
- Peter Jaks (1966–2011), Swiss ice hockey player
