= Uridashi bonds =

An Uridashi bond is a secondary offering of bonds outside Japan. They can be denominated in Yen or issued in a foreign currency. These bonds are sold to Japanese household investors. An Uridashi bond is normally issued in high-yielding currencies such as New Zealand Dollars or Australian Dollars in order to give the investor a higher return than the historically low domestic interest rate in Japan.

Provided that the interest rate differential between the foreign and local currency is maintained, the investor will receive higher interest rate payments than if they had invested in a Japanese Yen - denominated bond. In addition to the credit risk on the bond issuer, the investor also takes on currency risk since the foreign currency denominated coupon payments will have to be exchanged into Japanese Yen for the retail investor or if the investor should wish to sell the bond and exchange the proceeds from the sale back into Japanese Yen. Where the bond is issued in Japanese Yen, they are typically linked to a foreign currency or to an equity index like the Nikkei.

Uridashi bonds became very popular in the 2000s and are often associated with the carry trade in which a loan is made in a low interest currency to buy instruments in a higher yield currency. During the 2008 financial crisis the carry trade and foreign currency bonds in general came under criticism in Japan for contributing to the crisis.

On 1 November 2015 the size of the Uridashi Bond Market was US$33.2bn equivalent in 15 different currencies.
