= Ken Strauss =

American physician

Ken Strauss (born 1953) is a physician/author currently living in Spain. He is an Internist and Endocrinologist. For three decades he was Global Medical Director for BD, a leading medical and diagnostic enterprise. He is also Director for Safety in Medicine at the European Medical Association in Brussels.

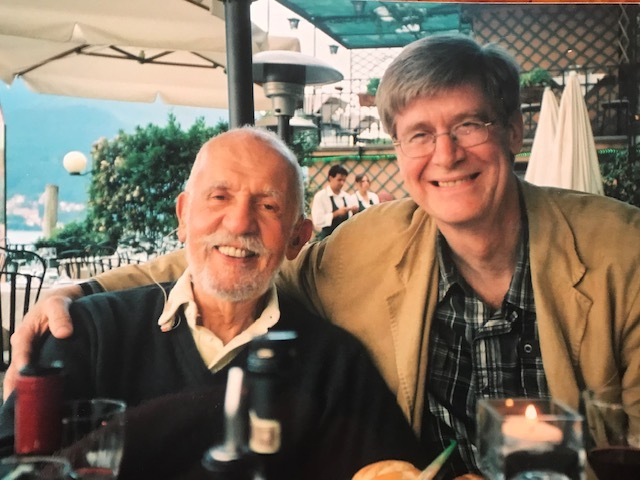
Right, with Eugene Kaplan, Como

== Early life, education and professional career ==
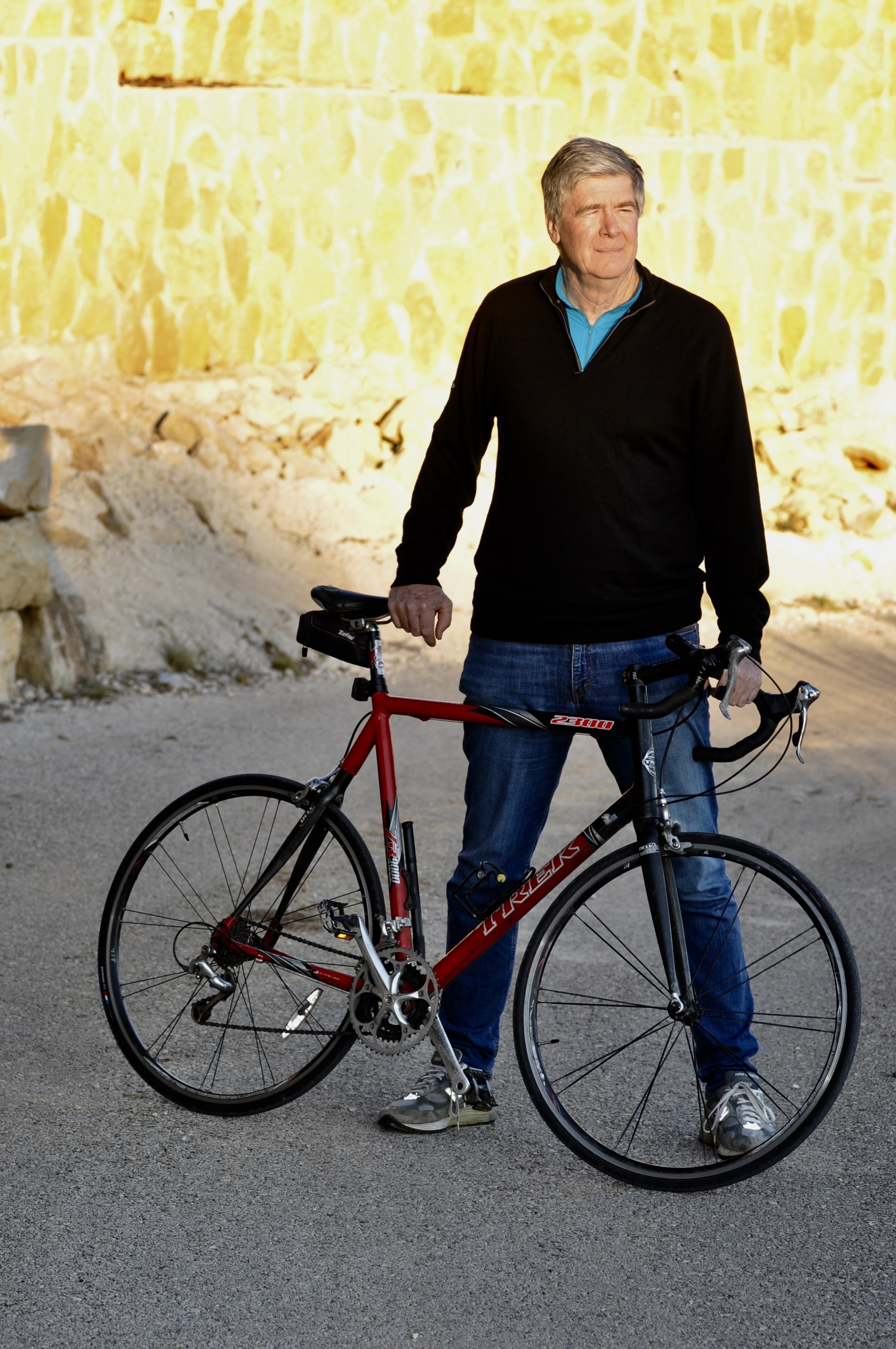
Biking in Spain, 2021

Born in New Orleans, Strauss was raised by missionary parents on the Caribbean island of Hispaniola. He studied at Columbia Bible College (now Columbia International University) from 1971 to 1975 and Trinity Evangelical Divinity School (1975–78) with a focus on the biblical languages of Greek and Hebrew. After this he embarked on medical studies. Strauss received his degree as a doctor from the University of South Carolina School of Medicine, Columbia, South Carolina, USA (1982–86). He did an Internal Medicine Internship and Residency at the Wake Forest University, North Carolina Baptist Hospital, Winston-Salem, North Carolina, USA (1986–89). His Endocrinology Fellowship was at the Harvard Medical School, Boston in the Beth Israel Hospital, Brigham & Women's Hospitals and Joslin Diabetes Center (1989–91).

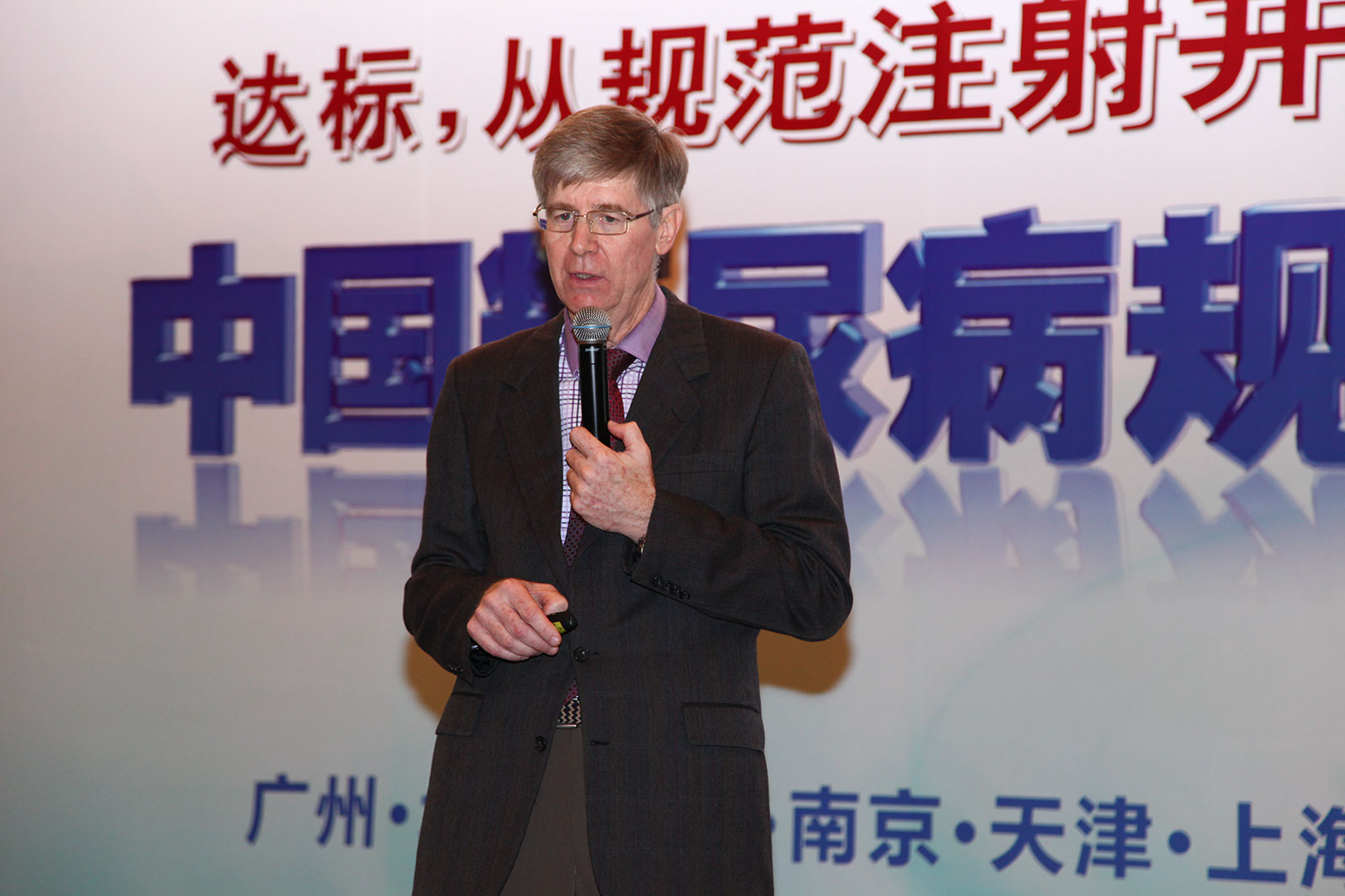
Speaking in China, 2016

He has lived most of his life in Latin America and Europe and speaks Spanish and French in addition to his native English. He gives talks frequently to audiences throughout Europe, Africa, the Middle East and Asia on topics related to diabetes, HIV disease and patient safety. He has directed clinical trials throughout the world, developing medical tools ranging from high-tech molecular instruments to routine injection devices. He has published 102 scientific papers written by himself and is an author on nearly 200 written by others.

Medical practices Strauss has introduced, innovated or enabled:

1. T Lymphocyte counting in HIV disease
2. Immunophenotyping in cancer
3. Flow cytometry analysis in auto-immunity
4. Ultra-short needles to optimize insulin delivery
5. Correct injection technique for intramuscular injections
6. Rotation of insulin injection sites to prevent diabetic lipohypertrophy
7. Diabetes management systems for primary care
8. No-dead-space syringes to maximize vaccine dosing
9. Safety sharps to avoid needlestick injuries
10. Closed catheter systems to prevent intravenous complications

== Literary publications ==
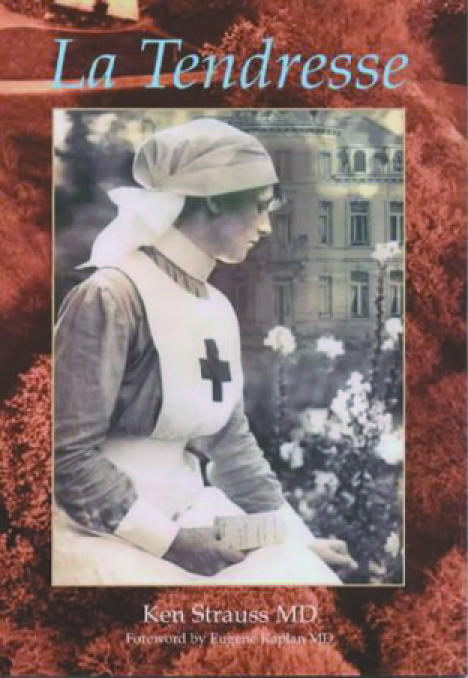

Strauss has published twenty-nine books, beginning with a novel, La Tendresse, published in 2002 by Black Ace Books of Forfar, Scotland. The novel juxtaposes the personal relationships of its protagonist, Dr. Alain Hamilton, with the experiences of trench warfare during the First World War. Reviews have noted that the book explores contrasting themes of love and war, focusing on the psychological and professional challenges faced by a surgeon in wartime.

In another novel, Maria Lindisima, a chance encounter in Paris between Montse, a Catalan scientist, and Fernando, a Colombian entrepreneur, blossoms into a love affair just as Leo, a young American, begins a scheming entanglement with the two. Unknown to Montse, her lab has been infiltrated by the Pentagon (using Leo) to develop a virulent flu strain—nicknamed Maria Lindisima—as a biological weapon. When she finds out, she begins a race against time to produce a naked DNA vaccine, the sole protection against the virus. However, on a visit to Colombia with Fernando, the guerrilla group, the FARC, kidnaps them, thereby acquiring the strain. With Leo's connivance they release it, triggering a pandemic. Montse has succeeded in producing the saving vaccine but she remains captive in the Colombian jungle. Though a thriller, the book is a stinging indictment of America's thirst for world domination and the ends to which some will go to ensure it.

Strauss has also written Javea...Yes!, a romping post-apocalyptic bike ride across Europe, which has become a Mad Max world. Ugly Duckling is an alternative history of the 45th occupant of the White House with a surprise outcome that both Republicans and Democrats will be delighted with. A failed attempt at regime change is hijacked by the most unlikely source, a black African, who throws the whole playbook at Ugly before discovering the secret to his transformation, thank to a mysterious Rwandan woman, a Magnetiseuse Energéticienne. Beauty Like a Tightened Bow uses poetic prose to recount an unrequited love, which is imagined as a long ambling conversation.

In his play Ship of Folly, Hearts of Gold Strauss tells the story of the Peace Ship chartered by Henry Ford which sailed from America to Europe in December 1915 with the grandiose intention of arbitrating the end of the First World War. On board were many champions of bizarre causes and social evangelists. Ford invested his fortune and reputation in the endeavour but, despite his sincere convictions and towering personality, he was betrayed by his own arrogance, naivety and petty prejudices. Ship of Folly is a cautionary tale in which Hearts of Gold are no match for powerful conspirators. In another play, Bananas, anyone?, the American invasion of the Dominican Republic in 1965 is parodied. Strauss lived through this revolution with his parents, who were missionaries there at the time. The play shows how it wounded and humiliated the country, as well as all involved. A third play, Ann and Rachid Rachid, is about Extraordinary Rendition and how this dragnet in the war on terror so easily caught up innocents like Dr. Rachid Rachid.

Additionally, Strauss has published several volumes of poetry, short stories, children's stories, theater and screenplays. All are available as ebooks on Kindle or paperbacks through Amazon. Strauss also regularly posts new work on substack.

== Books ==
- La Tendresse
- Maria Lindisma
- Javea...Yes!
- Ugly Duckling
- Beauty Like a Tightened Bow
- Ship of Folly, Heart of Gold and Other Plays
- To My Departed Children and Other Poems
- Look, there's Ibiza and Other Stories
- Terri and Jan and Other Stories
- Golden Lads and Girls and Other Stories
- La Tendresse and Other Plays
- Lace and Other Plays
- All My Children and Other Stories
- This Man Has A Uterus and Other Stories
- Lapland and Other Stories
- Into Every Married Mind and Other Stories
- Baby Yar and Other Stories
- Brian and Helen and Other Stories
- Wake Any Sleeping Dead and Other Poems and Tales
- In No Order and Other Musings
- You Gotta Be Kiddin’
- That’s Wild, Man!
- Un Coup de Dés
- Whodda Thunk It?
- 2023, keeps getting better
- 2024 and 2025 in Poems and Essays
- 155 Vol 1
- 155 Vol 2
- 155 Vol 3

== Scientific research and publications ==
Strauss's scientific interests are widespread.

His interest in immunology has led to publications in HIV disease, cellular activation and natural killer cell function, tumor immunology, HLA-B27-related rheumatologic conditions and screening, transplant cross-matching and graph rejection, pathophysiology of multiple sclerosis, leukemia diagnosis and minimal residual disease, platelet activation in vascular disease and stem cell transplantation in cancer patients. Publications in endocrinology cover the subjects of diabetes management and education, efficacy of insulin injecting devices, safe injection technique, intensive glucose management, GP office management of diabetes and the epidemiology of diabetes in developing regions of Africa and Eastern Europe. Additionally, Strauss has published on peripheral and central line catheters, anesthesia and surgical devices, safety injection devices, sharps disposal units, spinal and epidural catheters and vaccination devices.

== Le Château du Jardin ==
Intended as a retreat for health care artists, Le Jardin des Arts, is located in le Château du Jardin, a property owned by Strauss and listed as an architectural heritage site in Belgium. The official site for Patrimoine Architectural Belge describes it as follows:.

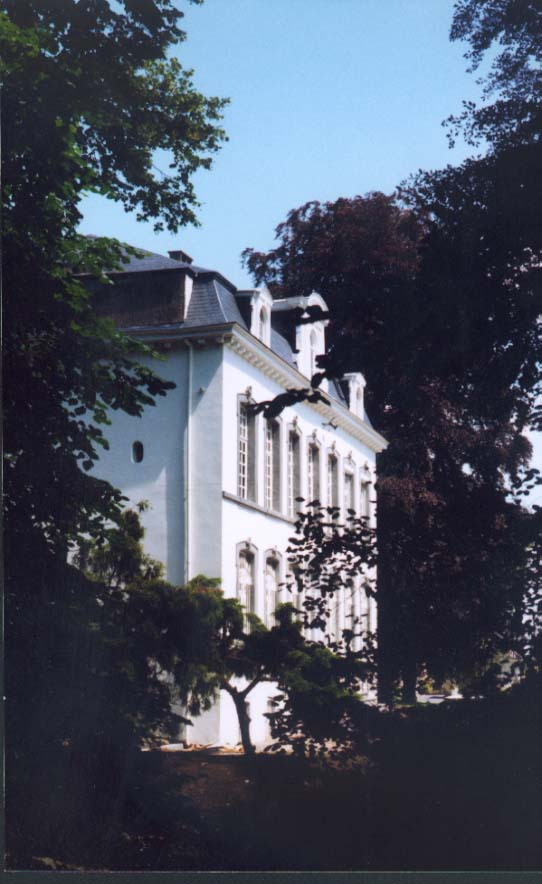
Château du Jardin

Tongre-Notre-Dame is best known for its basilica dedicated to the Virgin Mary, but it also has some unexpected treasures, such as the Château du Jardin. Built in the mid-19th century, this mansion stands in the middle of extensive formally laid out grounds. Today, the Château du Jardin is the property of an endocrinologist, Ken Strauss. He undertook the restoration of the residence with a view to holding medical seminars there. The Château du Jardin is a neo-classical, rectangular building. The frontage and rear external wall are two stories high, faced with finishing plaster and surmounted by a Mansard roof bordered with a wooden cornice. The façades have large rectangular window openings.

== Personal life ==
Dr. Strauss is a widower currently living in Javea, Spain. In 1979 he married Jeannette Reyes (1952–2011) from Bogota, Colombia with whom he had two children, Patrick (1982) and Natalia (1988). After their divorce in 1994 he was married to the writer and teacher, Florence Van Bastelear (1966–2005), from 1998 until her death in 2005. With his companion, the artist Fabienne Menchior (1964–2018), he had a third child, Camille (2005) and lived with Menchior until her death in 2018.

== Publications ==
HIV disease

- Hulstaert F, K. Strauss, M. Levacher, G. Vanham, L. Kestens, B. Bach. The staging and prognostic value of subset markers on CD8 cells in HIV disease. In Janossy G, Autran B. Miedema F (eds): Immunodeficiency in HIV Infection and AIDS, Karger Publishers, Basel, 1992:185-194.
- Bouscarat F, M. Levacher, M Dazza, K. Strauss, P. Girard, C. Ruggeri, M. Sinet. Correlation of CD8 lymphocyte activation with cellular viremia and plasma HIV RNA levels in asymptomatic patients infected by human immunodeficiency virus type 1. AIDS Research and Human Retroviruses, 1996; 12:17-24.
- Bainbridge D, Lowdell M, Hannet H, Strauss K, Karpas A. Can repeated plasma donation by asymptomatic HIV-infected individuals delay the onset of AIDS? Phil. Trans. R. Soc, 1997; 352:763-770.
- Lopez A, Caragol I, Candeias J, Villamor N, Echaniz P, Ortuno F, Sempere A, Strauss K, Orfao A. Enumeration of CD4+ T-cells in the peripheral blood of HIV-infected patients: interlaboratory study of the FACSCount system. Cytometry. 1999;38:231-7.

Immunology

- Strauss K, Gonzalez H. El syndrome de anticardiolipina. Acta Med Col 1988;13:46-49.
- Strauss KW, Gonzalez-Buritica H, Khamashta MA, Hughes GR. Polymyositis-dermatomyositis: a clinical review. Postgrad Med J. 1989;65:437-43.
- Hulstaert F, I. Hannet, V. Deneys, V. Munhyeshuli, T. Reichert, M. DeBruyer, K. Strauss. Age-related changes in human blood lymphocyte subpopulations. Clinical Immunology and Immunopathology, 1994; 70:152-158.
- Hulstaert F, J. Albrecht, I. Hannet, P. Lancaster, L. Buchner, J. Kunz, A. Falkenrodt, M. Tongio, F. DeKeyser, E. Veys, L. Noens, N. Mir, C. Costello, R. Becker, K. Strauss. An optimized method for routine HLA-B27 screening using flow cytometry. Cytometry, 1994; 18:21-29.
- Strauss K, F. Hulstaert, V. Deneys, A. Mazzon, I. Hannet, M. DeBruyere, T. Reichert, C. Sindic. The immune profile of multiple sclerosis: T-lymphocyte effects predominate over all other factors in cyclophosphamide-treated patients. Journal of Neuroimmunology 1995; 63:133-142.
- Strauss K, I. Hannet, S. Engels, A. Shiba, D. Ward, S. Ullery, M. Jinguji, J. Valinsky, D. Barnett, A. Orfao, L. Kestens. Performance Evaluation of the FACSCount system: a dedicated system for clinical cellular analysis. Cytometry, 1996; 26:52-59.

Endocrinology

- Strauss K. Endocrine complications of the Acquired Immunodeficiency Syndrome. Archives of Internal Medicine, 1991; 151:1441–1444.
- Akiguchi I, Strauss K, Borges M, Silva JE, Moses AC. Thyroid hormone receptors and 3,5,3'-triiodothyronine biological effects in FRTL5 thyroid follicular cells. Endocrinology, 1992;131:1279-87.

Pediatrics

- Lo Presti D, Ingegnosi C, Strauss K. Skin and subcutaneous thickness at injecting sites in children with diabetes: ultrasound findings and recommendations for giving injection. Pediatric Diabetes. 2012;13:525-33.
- Kalra S, Deeb AA, Dhingra M, Strauss K. Paediatric insulin injection technique: The softer side. J Pak Med Assoc. 2018;68:1270-1272.
- Kalra S, Hirsch LJ, Frid A, Deeb A, Strauss KW. Pediatric Insulin Injection Technique: A Multi-Country Survey and Clinical Practice Implications. Diabetes Ther. 2018;9:2291-2302.
- Deeb A, Abdelrahman L, Tomy M, Suliman S, Akle M, Smith M, Strauss K. Impact of Insulin Injection and Infusion Routines on Lipohypertrophy and Glycemic Control in Children and Adults with Diabetes. Diabetes Ther. 2019;10:259-267.

Oncology

- Bertino B, Knape W, Pytlinska M, Strauss K, Hammou JC. A comparative study of DNA content as measured by flow cytometry and image analysis in 1864 specimens. Analytical Cellular Pathology, 1994; 6:377-394.

Infectious Disease

- Strauss K, van Zundert A, Frid A, Costigliola V. Pandemic influenza preparedness: the critical role of the syringe. Vaccine 2006;24:4874-82.

Medical Safety

- Strauss K. 'Safety in Family Medicine', The European Textbook of Family Medicine, eds. M Bisconcin, G. Maso, N. Mathers. 2006: Passoni Editore, pp. 687–696.
- Strauss K. Is Europe falling behind the United States in the field of sharps safety? J Infus Nurs. 2009;32:128-9.
- Strauss K; WISE Consensus Group. WISE recommendations to ensure the safety of injections in diabetes. Diabetes Metab. 2012;38 Suppl 1:S2-8.
- Strauss K. Feit en fictie: Het risico op prikaccidenten door medische injecties. Tijdschrift voor Verpleegkundigen 2012;5:56-60.
- Strauss K. Risk of needlestick injury from injecting needles. Nurs Times. 2012;108:12, 14, 16.
- Strauss K. Synopsis of the WISE meeting. Diabetes Metab. 2012;38 Suppl 1:S15-26.
- Strauss K. Better safe than sorry. Nurs Stand. 2013 14–20;27:61.

Intravenous Therapy

- Rivera AM, Strauss K, Van Zundert A, Mortier E. The history of peripheral intravenous catheters: How plastic tubes revolutionized medicine. Acta Anaesthesiol Belg 2005; 56:271-282.
- Rivera AM, K. Strauss, A. Van Zundert, E. Mortier. Matching the peripheral intravenous catheter to the individual patient. Acta Anaesthesiol Belg 2006; 58:19-25.
- González López JL, Arribi Vilela A, Fernández del Palacio E, Olivares Corral J, Benedicto Martí C, Herrera Portal P. Indwell times, complications and costs of open vs closed safety peripheral intravenous catheters: a randomized study. J Hosp Infect. 2014 Feb;86(2):117-26.

Diabetes Therapy

- Strauss K, B. Ginsberg. Managing type II diabetes. European Union of General Practitioners Reference Book 1996/97.

Insulin Injection Technique

- Strauss K, Insulin injection techniques: Report from the 1st International Insulin Injection Technique Workshop, Strasbourg, France—June 1997, Pract Diab Int 1998:15; 16–20.
- Strauss K, Pautas de insulinoterapia y técnicas de inyección, Anales de Medicina Interna 1998:292-293.
- Strauss K. Ultra short (5mm) insulin needles: how do they affect injection technique? ISPAD, 1999, 127–132.
- Strauss K, I. Hannet, J. McGonigle, JL. Parkes, B. Ginsberg, R. Jamal, A. Frid, Ultra-short (5mm) insulin needles: trial results and clinical recommendations. Pract Diab Int 1999;16:22-25.
- Strauss K, De Gols H, Letondeur C, Matyjaszczyk M, Frid A. The Second Injection Technique Event (SITE), May 2000, Barcelona, Spain. Prac Diab Int 2000;19:17-21.
- De Coninck C, Frid A, Gaspar R, Hicks D, Hirsch L, Kreugel G, Liersch J, Letondeur C, Sauvanet JP, Tubiana N, Strauss K. Results and analysis of the 2008-2009 Insulin Injection Technique Questionnaire survey. J Diabetes 2010;2:168-79.
- Frid A, Hirsch L, Gaspar R, Hicks D, Kreugel G, Liersch J, Letondeur C, Sauvanet JP, Tubiana-Rufi N, Strauss K. The Third Injection Technique Workshop in Athens (TITAN). Diabetes Metab. 2010;36 Suppl 2:S19-29.
- Frid A, Hirsch L, Gaspar R, Hicks D, Kreugel G, Liersch J, Letondeur C, Sauvanet JP, Tubiana-Rufi N, Strauss K; Scientific Advisory Board for the Third Injection Technique Workshop. New injection recommendations for patients with diabetes. Diabetes Metab. 2010;36 Suppl 2:S3-18.
- Frid AH, Hirsch LJ, Menchior AR, Morel DR, Strauss KW. Worldwide Injection Technique Questionnaire Study: Injecting Complications and the Role of the Professional. Mayo Clin Proc. 2016;91:1224-30.
- Frid AH, Hirsch LJ, Menchior AR, Morel DR, Strauss KW. Worldwide Injection Technique Questionnaire Study: Population Parameters and Injection Practices. Mayo Clin Proc. 2016;91:1212-23.
- Hirsch LJ, Strauss KW. The Injection Technique Factor: What You Don't Know or Teach Can Make a Difference. Clin Diabetes 2019;37:227-233.

Insulin Therapy

- Frid AH, Kreugel G, Grassi G, Halimi S, Hicks D, Hirsch LJ, Smith MJ, Wellhoener R, Bode BW, Hirsch IB, Kalra S, Ji L, Strauss KW. New Insulin Delivery Recommendations. Mayo Clin Proc. 2016;91:1231-55.
- Frid A, Hirsch L, Strauss K. Optimal Insulin Delivery. Chapter published on line by Intechopen as eBook Ultimate Guide to Insulin. 2018 http://www.intechopen.com/books/ultimate-guide-to-insulin/optimal-insulin-delivery
- Deeb A, Ziaullah M, Akle M, Strauss K. Utilization and Challenges of Continuous Glucose Monitoring in Sensor-Augmented Pump Therapy: A Patient Experience Analysis. J Diabetes Sci Technol. 2019;13:146-147.

Lipohypertrophy related to Insulin Therapy

- Blanco M, Hernández MT, Strauss KW, Amaya M. Prevalence and risk factors of lipohypertrophy in insulin-injecting patients with diabetes. Diabetes Metab.2013;39:445-53.
- Smith M, Clapham L, Strauss K. UK lipohypertrophy interventional study. Diabetes Res Clin Pract. 2017;126:248-253.
- Strauss, K. L’éducation des patients présentant des lipohypertrophies a-t-elle un impact sur l’équilibre glycémique ? Médecine des Maladies Métaboliques 2017;11:425-430.

Medicine in the European Union

- Strauss K. Strumenti per la somministrazione dell-insulina e tecniche corrette per la sua iniezione. Il Diabete, 1997; 9:157-167.
- Look D, Strauss K. Nadeln mehrfach verwenden? Diabetes Journal 1998, 10: S. 31–34.
- Strauss K, H. De Gols, I. Hannet, T. M. Partanen, A. Frid. A pan-European epidemiologic study of insulin injection technique in patients with diabetes. Pract Diab Int 2002;19:71-76.
- Varroud-Vial M, Simon D, Attali J, Durand-Zaleski I, Bera L, Attali C, Letondeur C, Strauss K, Petit C, Charpentier G. Improving glycaemic control of patients with Type 2 diabetes in a primary care setting: a French application of the Staged Diabetes Management programme. Diabet Med. 2004;21:592-8.
- Strauss K, R Onia, A. van Zundert. Peripheral Intravenous Catheter Use in Europe: Towards the use of safety devices. Acta Anaesthesiol Scand 2008; 52:798-804.
- Leotta C, Fedele V, Schifilliti C, Ingegnosi C, Savoca G, Cucinotta L, Strauss K. Movement in health: housing a diabetes centre within a gym (and vice versa). J Diabetes 2011;3:273-7.
- Costigliola V, Frid A, Letondeur C, Strauss K. Needlestick injuries in European nurses in diabetes. Diabetes Metab. 2012;38 Suppl 1:S9-14.
- Strauss K. L’innovazione technologica migliorera l’esperienza iniettiva dei pazienti: aghi piu corti et sottili. Il Diabete 2012;24:190-192.
- Grassi G, Scuntero P, Trepiccioni R, Marubbi F, Strauss K. Optimizing insulin injection technique and its effect on blood glucose control. J Clin Transl Endocrinol. 2014;1:145-150.
- Strauss K. Study shows: improved glycemic control in diabetes patients by correcting the injection technique (German text). Kinderkrankenschwester. 2015;34:115-7.
- Gentile S, Strollo F, Guarino G, Giancaterini A, Ames PRJ, Speese K, Guida P, Strauss K. on behalf of the AMDOSDI Italian Injection Technique Study Group (2016) Factors hindering correct identification of unapparent lipohypertrophy. J Diab Metab Dis Contr 3: 00065.
- Campinos C, Le Floch JP, Petit C, Penfornis A, Winiszewski P, Bordier L, Lepage M, Fermon C, Louis J, Almain C, Morel D, Hirsch L, Strauss KW. An Effective Intervention for Diabetic Lipohypertrophy: Results of a Randomized, Controlled, Prospective Multicenter Study in France. Diabetes Technol Ther. 2017;19:623-632.

Medicine in Central Europe

- Strauss K. Bezpieczenstwo I wygoda wstrzykiwania insuliny. Diabetologia Polska, 1995; 2:305-308.
- Vesely R, J. Barths, F. Vanlangendonck, I. Hannet, K. Strauss. Initial results of Central European Immunophenogyping Quality Control Program (CEQUAL). Cytometry 1996; 26:108-112.
- Vykhovanets EV, Chernyshov VP, Slukvin II, Antipkin YG, Vasyuk AN, Klimenko HF, Strauss KW. 131I dose-dependent thyroid autoimmune disorders in children living around Chernobyl. Clin Immunol Immunopathol. 1997;84:251-9.
- Chernyshov V, E. Vykhovanets, I. Slukvin, Y. Antipkin, A. Vasyuk, K. Strauss, Analysis of blood lymphocyte subsets in children living on territory that received high amounts of fallout from Chernobyl accident. Clinical Immunology and Immunopathology, 1997:122-128.
- Wilczynski J, K. Cypryk, K. Strauss, R. Mazze. The role of Staged Diabetes Management in improving diabetes care in Poland. Practical Diabetes Management, 1999; 16:137-141.

Medicine in China

- Tao L, Zhang X, Strauss K, Hirsch LJ, Chandran A. Estimated economic burden of insulin injection-related lipohypertrophy in Chinese patients with diabetes. Value Health. 2014;17:A748-9.
- Wang W, Guo X, Shen G, Bai G, Wei Z, Liu J, Hirsch L, Strauss K. Skin and subcutaneous tissue thickness at insulin injection sites in Chinese diabetes patients: Clinical implications. Diabetes Metab. 2016;42:374-377.
- Song Z, Guo X, Ji L, Huang X, Hirsch LJ, Strauss KW. Insulin Injection Technique in China Compared with the Rest of the World. Diabetes Ther. 2018;9:2357-2368.

Medicine in India

- Kalra S, Mithal A, Sahay R, John M, Unnikrishnan AG, Saboo B, Ghosh S, Sanyal D, Hirsch LJ, Gupta V, Strauss KW. Indian Injection Technique Study: Population Characteristics and Injection Practices. Diabetes Ther. 2017;8:637-657.
- Kalra S, Mithal A, Sahay R, John M, Unnikrishnan AG, Saboo B, Ghosh S, Sanyal D, Hirsch LJ, Gupta V, Strauss KW. Indian Injection Technique Study: Injecting Complications, Education, and the Health Care Professional. Diabetes Ther. 2017;8:659-672.

Medicine in Africa

- Levin A, Brubaker G, Shao J, Kumby D, O'Brien T, Goedert J, Strauss K, Blattner W, Hannet I. Determination of T-lymphocyte subsets on site in rural Tanzania: results in HIV-1 infected and non-infected individuals. International Journal of STD & AIDS, 1996:288-291.

Medicine in Latin America

- Calliari LE, Cudizio L, Tschiedel B, Pedrosa HC, Rea R, Pimazoni-Netto A, Hirsch L, Strauss K. Insulin Injection Technique Questionnaire: results of an international study comparing Brazil, Latin America and World data. Diabetol Metab Syndr. 2018;10:85.

Medicine in Turkey

- Dagdelen S, Deyneli O, Olgun N, Siva ZO, Sargin M, Hatun S, Kulaksizoglu M, Kaya A, Gürlek CA, Hirsch LJ, Strauss KW; ITQ Turkish Study Group. Turkish Insulin Injection Technique Study: Population Characteristics of Turkish Patients with Diabetes Who Inject Insulin and Details of Their Injection Practices as Assessed by Survey Questionnaire. Diabetes Ther. 2018;9:1629-1645.
- Dagdelen S, Deyneli O, Olgun N, Siva ZO, Sargin M, Hatun S, Kulaksizoglu M, Kaya A, Gürlek CA, Hirsch LJ, Strauss KW; ITQ Turkish Study Group. Turkish Insulin Injection Techniques Study: Complications of Injecting Insulin Among Turkish Patients with Diabetes, Education They Received, and the Role of Health Care Professional as Assessed by Survey Questionnaire. Diabetes Ther. 2018;9:1615-1628.
