= William V. Tamborlane =

American pediatrician and academic (1946–2026)

William Valentine Tamborlane Jr. (August 25, 1946 – May 12, 2026) was an American pediatrician and academic who was Professor and Chief of pediatric endocrinology at Yale School of Medicine from 1986.

== Background ==
Tamborlane was born in The Bronx, New York City, on August 25, 1946. He grew up in Haworth, New Jersey, attended Bergen Catholic High School, Georgetown University and Georgetown University School of Medicine. He raised his three children in Madison, Connecticut, with his wife.

- Georgetown University, Washington D.C. B.S. 05/1968 Chemistry
- Georgetown University, School of Medicine M.D. 05/1972 Medicine
- Georgetown University Hospital Residency 06/1975 Pediatrics
- Georgetown University Hospital Chief Resident 06/1975 Pediatrics
- Yale University School of Medicine Postdoc 06/1976 Pediatric Endocrinology
- Yale University School of Medicine Postdoc 06/1977 Endocrinology, Medicine and Pediatrics
- He was board certificated in pediatric and adolescent endocrinology

Tamborlane died on May 12, 2026, at the age of 79.

== Research ==
The focus of his work was patient-oriented research in pediatric type 1 diabetes (T1D) and related metabolic and endocrine disorders. Most of his more than 980 original articles, chapters and reviews are related to clinical and translational studies in diabetes. As Chair of the Diabetes Research in Children's Network, Co-chair of the JDRF CGM Study Group, and Vice Chair of the T1D Exchange Registry, he has been involved in studies related to continuous glucose monitoring and other advanced diabetes technologies, as well as randomized clinical trials of new drugs for adolescents with type 2 diabetes.

He was the first to demonstrate that insulin infusion pumps markedly improve control of type 1 diabetes ). He then used pump therapy as a tool to show that many of the surrogate biomarkers of diabetic complications were reversed by intensive insulin therapy. Subsequently, with colleague Robert Sherwin, he helped form Kroc Study Group that carried out the feasibility study for the DCCT (a pivotal longitudinal diabetes study of intensive management that then evolved to the EDIC Study).

== Most cited publications ==
- Weiss R, Dziura J, Burgert TS, Tamborlane WV, Taksali SE, Yeckel CW, Allen K, Lopes M, Savoye M, Morrison J, Sherwin RS. Obesity and the metabolic syndrome in children and adolescents. New England journal of medicine. 2004 Jun 3;350(23):2362-74.(Cited 4756 times, according to Google Scholar)
- Sinha R, Fisch G, Teague B, Tamborlane WV, Banyas B, Allen K, Savoye M, Rieger V, Taksali S, Barbetta G, Sherwin RS. Prevalence of impaired glucose tolerance among children and adolescents with marked obesity. New England journal of medicine. 2002 Mar 14;346(11):802-10.(Cited 2394 times, according to Google Scholar.)
- Amiel SA, Sherwin RS, Simonson DC, Lauritano AA, Tamborlane WV. Impaired insulin action in puberty. New England Journal of Medicine. 1986 Jul 24;315(4):215-9. (Cited 1188 times, according to Google Scholar.)
- Danne T, Nimri R, Battelino T, Bergenstal RM, Close KL, DeVries JH, Garg S, Heinemann L, Hirsch I, Amiel SA, Beck R. International consensus on use of continuous glucose monitoring. Diabetes care. 2017 Dec 1;40(12):1631-40. (open access) (Cited 1005 times, according to Google Scholar.)

== Honors ==
- Tamborlane was a member of the Connecticut Academy of Science and Engineering
- 2006 and 2011 JDRF Mary Tyler Moore and S. Robert Levine, M.D. Excellence in Clinical Research Award
- 2009 Diabetes Technology Society's Diabetes Technology Leadership Award
- 2010 American Diabetes Association Outstanding Physician Clinician Award
- 2011 National Award for Career Achievement and Contributions to Clinical and Translational Science by the Society for Clinical and Translational Science
- 2014 International Society for Pediatric and Adolescent Diabetes (ISPAD) Prize for Achievement
- 2017 American Diabetes Association Award for Achievement in Clinical Diabetes Research
