= Continuous glucose monitor =

Blood glucose monitoring device

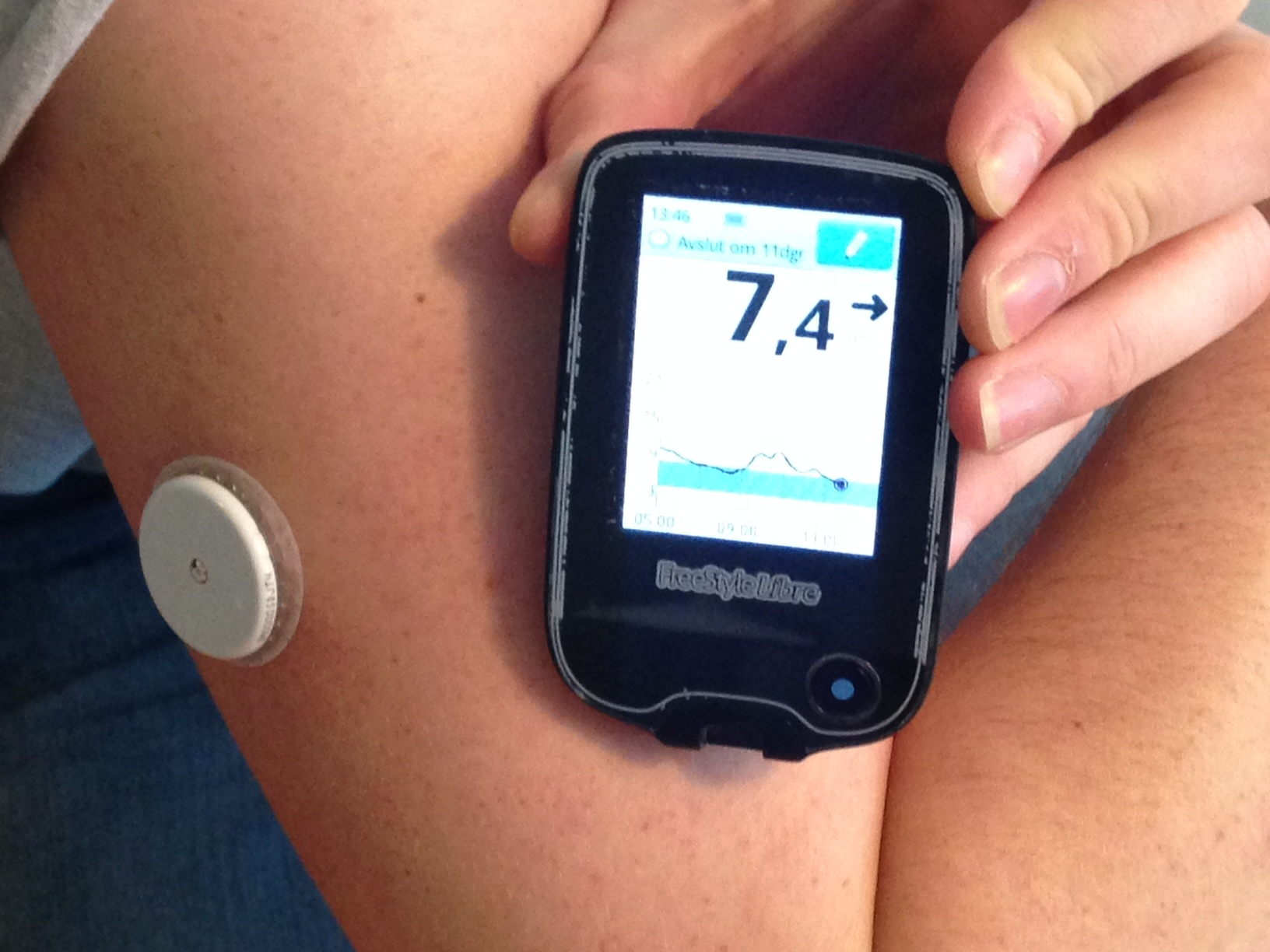
- Abbott Laboratories' FreeStyle Libre CGM. The sensor and transmitter are fixed to the upper arm. The receiver shows the blood glucose level and a graph of recent blood glucose levels.
- Classification: Medical device
- Uses: Blood glucose monitoring
- Related: Fingerprick testing

A continuous glucose monitoring (CGM) system is a medical or wellness device used to continuously track interstitial glucose levels in real time, replacing the need for periodic finger-stick blood draws. Tracking interstitial glucose is a valid way to monitor blood glucose due to their high correlation, despite a lag time in glucose levels between the interstitial space and the bloodstream.

While historically reserved for clinical diabetes management, such as tracking by individuals with type 1, type 2 or gestational diabetes, CGM systems are widely utilized by non-diabetic populations. These include individuals with metabolic conditions like prediabetes or polycystic ovary syndrome (PCOS), elite athletes optimizing endurance fueling, and health-conscious consumers tracking personalized dietary responses, weight management, and everyday metabolic fitness.

The early generations of these systems typically consisted of a sensor patch (worn on the back of the upper arm or the side of the torso) paired with a separate, portable handheld reader to display results. Modern sensors use Bluetooth to transmit data directly to a smartphone app, allowing users to view trends, receive high or low alerts, and share their metabolic data with healthcare providers or coaches in real time.

Most CGMs are electrochemical systems that utilize an enzymatic reaction with glucose molecules in the body's interstitial fluid. This reaction generates electrical current on the nanoampere (nA) scale that is directly proportional to the localized glucose concentration. The resulting data is then wirelessly transmitted from the patch to a paired device, where the real-time readings are displayed to the user. The FreeStyle Libre 3 by Abbott, AccuCheck Smart Guide by Roche, Dexcom G7 by Dexcom, Guardian 4 by Medtronic, SIBIO by Sibionics are examples of electrochemical CGM systems. These systems are known as minimally invasive, since sensor application requires a physical insertion of the sensing filament in the subcutaneous skin tissue. Operational time of electrochemical CGMs spans 14-16 days.

Some CGMs utilize an optical detection (fluorescence) of glucose to provide a real time reading, e.g., the Eversense 365 by Senseonics. However, the installation of such systems requires a minor surgery, so the device is installed by professionals in the clinic and not by the user. Operational time of optical CGM systems is much higher and can last up to one year.

Some CGM systems must be calibrated once at the activation, or calibrated periodically with traditional blood glucose measurements to establish the baseline for the measurement and compensate for the drift, whereas others do not require calibration by the user (factory calibration).

== Benefits ==
Continuous glucose monitoring is gaining in popularity for a variety of reasons.

- Traditional fingerstick testing measures blood glucose levels at only a single point in time. CGM enables users to see blood glucose levels continually, as well as trends in blood glucose levels over time. This results in a higher patient's lifespan by reducing devastating chronic complications and timely treatment of hyper or hypoglycemia events.
- CGM is more convenient and less painful than traditional fingerstick testing: a single insertion every two weeks versus multiple finger pricks a day.
- Possibility of insulin pump integration for automated diabetes treatment (not in all CGM models). Advanced CGMs are able to communicate with insulin pumps in real time for precise and automated diabetes management.
- Integration of predictive algorithms and immediate safety alarms for better glucose control.

== Data analysis ==
A Nature paper by Lutsker and colleagues showed that the patterns measured by CGM can be used to predict health risks, including diabetes and heart conditions, years in advance. This was achieved by training a Transformer architecture on 10M CGM samples.

== Limitations ==
- Physiological Fluid Lag: Because CGMs sample interstitial fluid (the fluid between fat cells) rather than direct blood, there is a minor 5-to-10-minute physiological delay before changes in blood sugar reflect on the screen. This lag is generally clinically significant during rapid spikes or crashes (e.g., during intense exercise or immediately after a fast-acting carbohydrate meal).
- Compression lows or pressure-induced sensitivity attenuations (PISA) are false hypoglycemic readings resulting from pressure applied at the CGM site. These can be caused by the user sleeping or sitting on the sensor, and may result in false hypoglycemia alarm.
- Chemical Interferences: Certain substances, such as ascorbic acid, gentisic acid, acetaminophen, hydroxyurea, methyldopa can cross the protective sensor membrane and cause electrochemical interference. Electrochemical oxidation of these compounds adds a false-positive readings to the real glucose levels, and the contribution of false signal is highly depends on the real glucose levels - at low glucose the contribution of interferences is much higher, compared to high glucose. In optical CGMs interferences are different - structurally similar to glucose molecule (e.g., mannitol or sorbitol)
- Initial "Warm-Up": Upon inserting a new patch, the body's natural localized immune response requires a brief stabilization window. While early models required hours of blindness, modern systems still require a 30-to-60-minute automated warm-up period where users must temporarily rely on traditional finger pricks if a reading is needed. During this period, the system is reaching the steady state.
- Atypical Baseline Mismatch (Sensor Drift): Glucose readings are highly dependent on the immune body response, which may cause a signal drift over time, e.g., due to the encapsulation of sensor filament by body proteins, which leads to the baseline drift and false low readings. Such events can be detected by the sensor itself, and ask for an additional calibration from the user, using a blood glucose test strips.

== Flash glucose monitoring ==
Flash glucose monitoring is a historical subset of continuous glucose monitoring technology where data is transferred on-demand via Near-Field Communication (NFC) rather than continuously streamed wirelessly.

- Mechanism: First introduced commercially in 2015, early FGM systems utilized a factory-calibrated subcutaneous sensor that recorded glucose levels in the interstitial fluid continuously. However, rather than utilizing a continuous Bluetooth link, the sensor stored up to eight hours of data internally. To view readings and log data, users had to physically scan or "flash" an external reader or smartphone within a few centimeters of the patch.
- Historical Impact: The introduction of FGM was a significant milestone in diabetes care because it pioneered mass-market factory calibration, completely eliminating the traditional requirement for daily finger-stick blood tests.
- Regulatory and Insurance Distinctions: In the late 2010s, the operational differences between FGM and traditional CGM created distinct insurance and reimbursement pathways. Because FGM systems lacked continuous, unprompted alarms and were less expensive to manufacture, healthcare networks like the UK's National Health Service (NHS) and US insurance providers initially granted wider coverage to FGM devices over standard CGMs.
- Convergence with CGM: By the early 2020s, the technological distinction between flash monitoring and continuous monitoring largely dissolved. Subsequent generations of these devices integrated automated Bluetooth transmitters to stream real-time data and predictive alarms every minute, effectively transitioning the product category entirely into mainstream continuous glucose monitoring.

== History ==
=== United States ===
The first CGM system was approved by the FDA in 1999. Continued development has extended the length of time sensors can be worn, options for receiving and reading data, and settings for alerting users to high and low glucose levels.

The first iteration of the Medtronic MiniMed took glucose readings every ten seconds with average readings reported every five minutes. Sensors could be worn for up to 72 hours.

A second system, developed by Dexcom, was approved in 2006. The sensor was approved for use for up to 72 hours, and the receiver needed to be within five feet for transmission of data.

In 2008, the third model was approved, Abbott Laboratories' Freestyle Navigator. Sensors could be worn for up to five days.

In 2012, Dexcom released a new device that allowed for the sensor to be worn for seven days and had a transmission distance of 20 feet. Dexcom later introduced an app allowing data from the sensor to be transmitted to an iPhone. This system was approved for pediatric use in 2015.

In September 2017, the FDA approved the first CGM that does not require calibration with fingerstick measurement, the FreeStyle Libre. The Libre is considered a "flash monitoring" system (FGM), and thus not a true ("real-time") CGM system. This device could be worn for up to ten days, but required 12 hours to start readings. It was followed by an updated device, the FreeStyle Libre 2, that could be worn for up to 14 days, and needed only one hour to start a new sensor. The FreeStyle Libre 2 was approved in Europe in October 2018, and enabled configuration of alerts when glucose is out of range.

In June 2018, the FDA approved the Eversense CGM system (manufactured by Senseonics Inc) for use in people 18 years of age and older with diabetes. This is the first FDA-approved CGM to include a fully implantable sensor to detect glucose, which can be worn for up to 90 days. The Eversense XL, a 180-day version of the system, was approved in Europe in October 2017.

In February 2025, the FDA alerted patients of a safety concern continuous glucose monitors (CGMs) that rely on a smartphone to deliver critical safety alerts, because reports showed that people were missing alerts due to technology configuration issues.

=== China ===
China develops and produces CGM systems. The first CGM system to be approved for the European Union is manufactured by Medtrum Technologies. The sensor's intended use is up to 14 days and measures glucose levels every 2 minutes via a smartphone application. Medtrum was founded in 2008 and is based in Shanghai, China.

At the end of 2017, Medtrum introduced the TouchCare A6 CGM (later A7 or Slim in some countries) which measures glucose levels in the interstitial fluid up to 14 days. The TouchCare system comes with mobile applications, including a remote view application. The TouchCare system has glucose alerts and requires calibration every 24 hours.

At the end of 2021 the Medtrum Nano was announced, a very slim device not requiring calibration, approved for up to 14 days use, with customizable glucose alerts.

Medtrum makes both CGM and insulin pumps, both controlled by a single smartphone application which enables the user to monitor glucose levels and trigger insulin delivery in a closed-loop system.

=== United Kingdom ===
UK NICE guidelines introduced for the NHS in March 2022 in England and Wales advise that all Type 1 diabetic patients should be offered either flash glucose monitoring or CGM. People with Type 2 diabetes should be offered flash glucose monitoring or CGM if they use insulin twice daily or more, are otherwise advised to finger-prick eight times a day, have recurrent or severe hypoglycemia, have impaired hypoglycemia awareness, or cannot monitor their own blood sugar levels but they or a caretaker could use a scanning device. Details differ in Scotland and Northern Ireland.

== Device characteristics ==
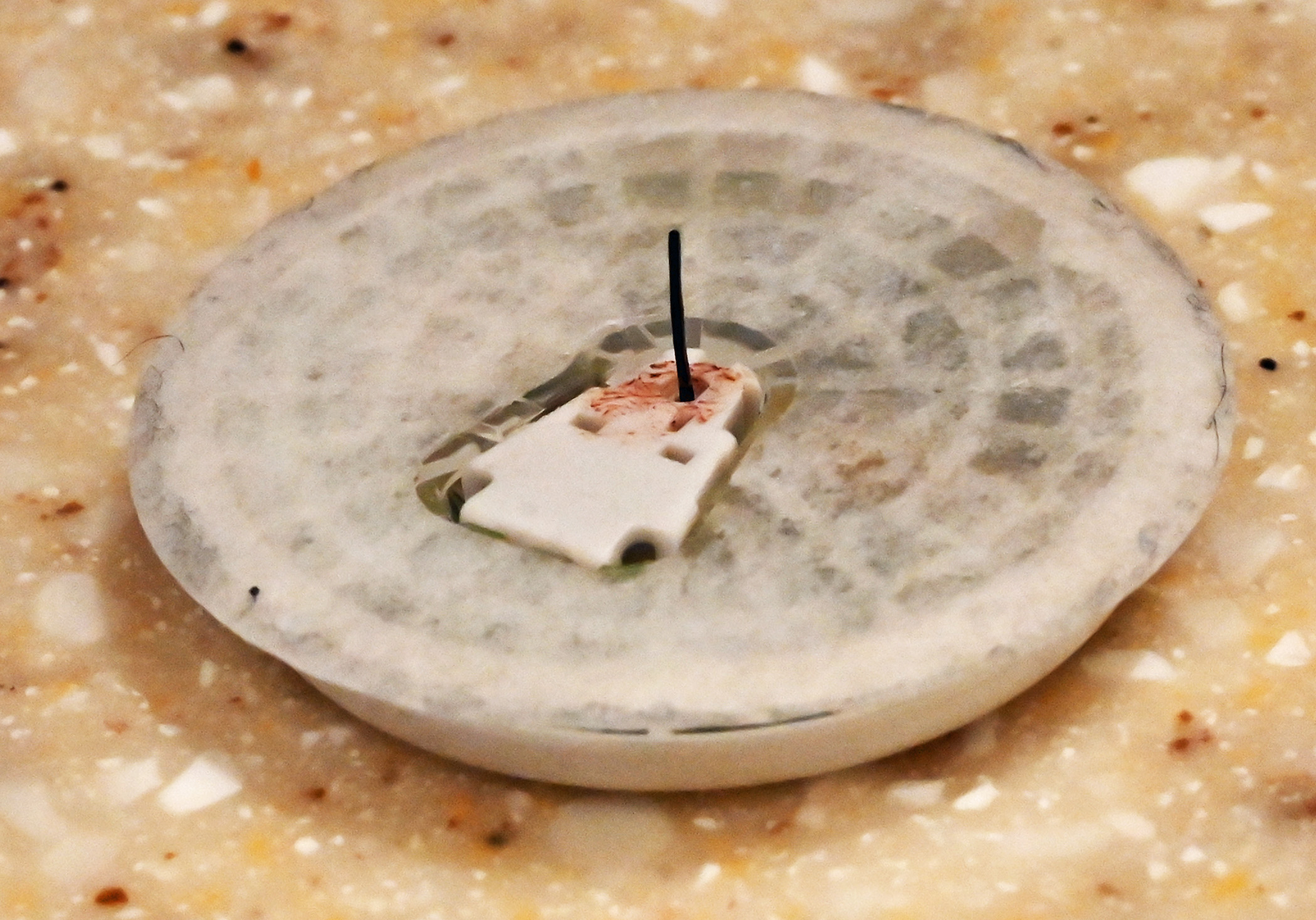
Backside of the Sensor for FreeStyle Libre 2, 2.8cm (1-1/8 inch) wide, showing the probe

- Continuous versus flash monitoring: Dexcom, Eversense, and Libre 2 and 3 use continuous monitoring where information on the glucose levels are continuously updated. Continuous monitoring allows setting of automatic alarms that are triggered when the glucose level goes out of pre-configured thresholds. FreeStyle Libre 2 and 3 allow configuration of alarms when glucose reaches a pre-determined level.

In contrast, with flash monitoring such as the Freestyle Libre1, the glucose level is read automatically by the sensor; however, data is only transmitted to the user on user request. The glucose information stored on the sensor contains all the data since the previous read (up to 8 hours).

- Implantable sensors: Since the electronics and battery require a relatively large package, most CGM sensors are worn over the skin with the actual sensing probe penetrating the skin. However the Eversense sensor is an actual implant, and receives its power wirelessly from a so-called transmitter worn above the skin. The "transmitter" receives data from the sensor every 5 minutes and forwards that data to a nearby device wirelessly. However unlike the Freestyle Libre, the implanted device is too small to have its own battery and memory, so that no glucose readings are generated during periods in which the transmitter is not being worn. The transmitter must be removed at least once a day for recharging (10 minutes) and replacement of the adhesive.

== Closed-loop system ==
The CGM is a key element in the development of a "closed-loop" system for the treatment of type I diabetes. A closed-loop system monitors blood glucose by CGM and sends data to an insulin pump for calculated delivery of insulin without user intervention. A number of insulin pumps currently offer an "auto mode"; however, this is not yet a fully closed loop system. There are several implementations, including the artificial pancreas system and the open source OpenAPS.

== Emerging CGM technologies ==
The continuous glucose monitoring space remains subject to extensive research and development in building lower cost, more accurate and more easy-to-use sensing solutions, some of which aim to be noninvasive. A noninvasive CGM has been defined as a medical device that can measure glucose levels in the body without puncturing the skin, drawing blood or causing any pain.

As of May 2026, Abbott Laboratories (with the FreeStyle Libre platform) and Dexcom, Inc. continue to lead the global volume market, collectively accounting for over 90% of global shipments, with additional competition from other established and regional manufacturers. Medtronic plc maintains a significant market share tightly integrated with its automated insulin pump ecosystems. Furthermore, F. Hoffmann-La Roche (Accu-Chek) and Ascensia Diabetes Care have substantial distribution networks across Europe, Latin America, and Asia. Additionally, the availability of affordable, calibration-free international systems (such as Sibionics and Aidex) has decentralized the market outside of North America. Non-invasive, no-needle optical systems have achieved minor regional regulatory clearances but have seen limited market adoption due to clinical accuracy limitations.

=== Emerging invasive CGM technologies ===
Multiple invasive CGM solutions have been under development since the early 2000s.

The Eversense is an implantable sensor that sits underneath the skin. A removable smart transmitter is then placed on the skin above the sensor with an adhesive. Senseonics has commercialized its 180-day Eversense XL sensing systems in both the U.S. and European markets. In June 2023, it announced what it deemed favorable safety and accuracy data for its 365-day sensor, suggesting it may be commercializable in the future. In October 2024, Senseonics launched the Eversense 365 in the US, the first one-year CGM system.

A solution built by U.S. firm GlySens, aimed to remove the need for an external reader by creating a sensor that could be implanted under the skin, that directly transmitted glucose values to an external app. As of August 2023, this undertaking has stalled and the system has not been approved anywhere and the company is defunct.

Another invasive CGM technology under development by Profusa Inc, based in Emeryville, California, builds on sensing research projects previously undertaken by the company under DARPA grants. This technology is composed of a hydrogel microsensor that is placed under the skin subcutaneously in a non-surgical procedure. In a 2020 literature review several biomedical engineers supported Profusa's claims that the non-surgical insertion procedure differentiates it favorably from Senseonics' Eversense system, as the latter requires a surgical procedure to insert and remove the sensor. The Profusa sensor allegedly also does not need to be removed because it overcomes the foreign body response. A reader is placed on the skin on top of where the sensor is, with the sensor transmitting a light signal to it. The sensor is claimed to last for three to six months. The is information then passed on to a smartphone where it can be tracked through an app. As of August 2023, this sensor has not attained regulatory approval in any jurisdiction, though a similar Profusa system measuring oxygen levels under the skin, has CE certification in Europe. Profusa has filed to go public via SPAC transaction.

A similar approach was under development by another California-based company called Metronom Health. This company has not released news releases, nor has any news covered any progress in terms of its research and development.

Yet another invasive approach is being developed by Belgium-based Indigo Diabetes. Indigo states that it is developing a CGM called a "continuous multi-metabolite monitoring system (CMM)". It is designed to provide people living with diabetes access to information on their glucose and other metabolite levels at any given time. It has yet to attain regulatory approval. The company completed a clinical trial in April 2024.

=== Emerging noninvasive CGM technologies ===
The ease of use many CGM users expect would be provided by a safe and accurate noninvasive device has led to significant innovation and research.

Noninvasive approaches can be divided into interstitial fluid-based, radio frequency-based or breath-based. Interstitial fluid-analyzing sensors either use a device to analyze fluid on the skin or under the skin by sending infrared lasers to detect glucose levels in fluid. Radio frequency devices go through the skin and may derive glucose level information from blood directly.

Apple has reportedly been working on a noninvasive CGM that it seeks to integrate into its Apple Watch. In March 2023 it was reported to have established proof-of-concept of a noninvasive CGM. Another company working on noninvasive CGM is Masimo, which sued Apple for patent infringement in this area in 2020. Masimo has also filed new patents through its subsidiary Cercacor (pending as of September 2023) covering a joint continuous glucose monitoring and pump-closed loop delivery system.

Samsung announced that it would be incorporating glucose monitoring with its smartwatch with a targeted release year of 2025. As of October 2023 the last update was in December 2022. It is not clear whether the watch will integrate readings from an external CGM such as Dexcom's or Abbott's, or work standalone. The company in 2020 published literature regarding a non-invasive method it had developed with MIT scientists to engage in continuous glucose monitoring using spectroscopy. The company has filed patents related to this technology.

SugarBeat, built by Nemaura Medical, is a wireless non-invasive blood glucose monitoring system using a disposable skin patch. The patch connects to a rechargeable transmitter which detects blood sugar and transfers the data to a mobile app every five minutes. The patch can be used for 24 hours. Electronic currents are used to draw interstitial fluid to the surface to analyse the glucose level. SugarBeat has achieved regulatory approval in Saudi Arabia and Europe, though market penetration rates remain very low. The company declared US$503,906 in revenue for the fiscal year ending March 2022, which compares to Dexcom's more than $3 billion. As of August 2023 it had submitted a US FDA premarket approval application for sugarBEAT.

Another noninvasive system is built by US company Movano Health. It uses a small ring placed on the arm. Movano said in 2021 that it was building the smallest ever custom radio frequency (RF)-enabled sensor designed for simultaneous blood pressure and glucose monitoring. Movano is listed as MOVE on NASDAQ. By August 2023 Movano had shifted to building sensor rings for other parameters, such as heart rate, blood oxygen levels, respiration rate, skin temperature variability, and menstrual symptom tracking.

DiaMonTech AG is a Berlin, Germany-based privately held company developing the D-Pocket, a non-CGM glucose sensor that uses infrared laser technology to scan the tissue fluid in the skin and detect glucose molecules. Short pulses of infrared light are sent to the skin, which are absorbed by the glucose molecules. This generates heat waves that are detected using its patented IRE-PTD method. The company claims a high selectivity of its method, results of a first study have been published in the Journal of Diabetes Science and Technology. In this study, a Median Absolute Relative Difference of 11.3% is claimed. DiaMonTech has announced that its envisioned follow-up product D-Sensor, will feature continuous measurements, making it a CGM though no release date has been given.

The BioXensor developed by British company BioRX uses patented radio frequency technology, alongside a multiple sensor (also capturing blood oxygen levels, ECG, respiration rate, heart rate and body temperature) approach. The company claims this enables the measurement of blood glucose levels every minute reliably, accurately, and non-invasively. BioXensor had not received regulatory approval as of June 2023.

Haifa, Israel-based company HAGAR completed a study of its GWave non-invasive CGM, reporting high accuracy. This sensor uses radiofrequency waves to measure glucose levels in the blood. The device had not received regulatory approval anywhere as of August 2023. One of the criticisms of radiofrequency technology as a way of measuring glucose is that studies in 2019 found that glucose can only be detected in the far infrared (nanometer wavelengths), rather than radiofrequencies even in the centimeter and millimeter wavelength range, putting into question the viability of radio frequencies for measuring glucose.

Glucomodicum is based in Helsinki, Finland. Their attempted solution uses interstitial fluid to non-invasively measure glucose levels continuously. It does not have regulatory approval.

KnowLabs is a Seattle, U.S-based company building a CGM called the Bio-RFID sensor, which works by sending radio waves through the skin to measure molecular signatures in the blood, which Know Labs' machine learning algorithms use to compute the user's blood sugar levels. The company reported that it had built a prototype, but had not attained regulatory approval as of August 2023.

Liom (formerly named Spiden) is a Swiss startup building a multi-biomarker and drug level monitoring noninvasive smartwatch wearable with continuous glucose monitoring capability as its first application. It has so far not attained regulatory approval as of October 2023. In January 2024, Liom (then called Spiden) declared it had developed a prototype, with a claimed MARD (Mean Absolute Relative Difference) value to a reference glucose measurement of approximately 9%.

Occuity, a Reading, UK-based startup is taking a different approach to noninvasive glucose monitoring, by using the eye. The company is developing the Occuity Indigo, which will measure the change in refractive index of the eye to determine the concentration of glucose in the blood.
