= Noninvasive glucose monitor =

Blood glucose monitoring device

Non-invasive glucose monitor
- Purpose: measurement of blood glucose levels

Noninvasive glucose monitoring (NIGM), called Noninvasive continuous glucose monitoring when used as a CGM technique, is the measurement of blood glucose levels, required by people with diabetes to prevent both chronic and acute complications from the disease, without drawing blood, puncturing the skin, or causing pain or trauma. The search for a successful technique began about 1975 and has continued to the present without a clinically or commercially viable product.

== Early history ==
As of 1999, only one such product had been approved for sale by the FDA, based on a technique for electrically pulling glucose through intact skin, and it was withdrawn after a short time owing to poor performance and occasional damage to the skin of users.

Hundreds of millions of dollars have been invested in companies who have sought the solution to this long-standing problem. Approaches that have been tried include near-infrared spectroscopy (NIRS, measuring glucose through the skin using light of slightly longer wavelengths than the visible region), transdermal measurement (attempting to pull glucose through the skin using either chemicals, electricity or ultrasound), measuring the amount that polarized light is rotated by glucose in the front chamber of the eye (containing the aqueous humor), and many others.

A 2012 study reviewed ten technologies: bioimpedance spectroscopy, microwave/RF sensing, fluorescence technology, mid-infrared spectroscopy, near-infrared spectroscopy, optical coherence tomography, optical polarimetry, Raman spectroscopy, reverse iontophoresis, and ultrasound technology, concluding with the observation that none of these had produced a commercially available, clinically reliable device and that therefore, much work remained to be done.

As of 2014, disregarding the severe shortcomings mentioned above, at least one non-invasive glucose meter was being marketed in a number of countries. Still, as the mean absolute deviation of this device was nearly 30% in clinical trials, "further research efforts were desired to significantly improve the accuracy [...]".

While multiple technologies have been tried, Raman spectroscopy has gained traction as one promising technology for measuring glucose in interstitial fluid. Early attempts include C8 Medisensors and the Laser Biomedical Research Center at Massachusetts Institute of Technology (MIT) which have been working on a Raman spectroscopy sensor for more than 20 years and conducting clinical investigations in collaboration with the Clinical Research Center at University of Missouri, Columbia, US. In 2018 a paper in PLOS ONE showed independent validation data from a clinical investigation comprising 15 subjects with diabetes mellitus type 1 with a mean absolute relative difference (MARD) of 25.8%. The system used, was a custom-built confocal Raman setup. In 2019 researchers at the Samsung Advanced Institute of Technology (SAIT), Samsung Electronics, in collaboration with the Laser Biomedical Research Center MIT developed a new approach based on Raman spectroscopy that allowed them to see the glucose signal directly. The researchers tested the system in pigs and could get accurate glucose readings for up to an hour after initial calibration.

In 2020, German Institute for Diabetes-Technology published data from 15 subjects with type 1 diabetes on a new prototype GlucoBeam based on Raman spectroscopy from RSP Systems Denmark, showing a MARD of 23.6% on independent validation in out-patient setup with up till 8 days without recalibration.

With accuracy on marketed BGM devices in the US between 5.6 and 20.8%. A NIGM solution would likely need to have an accuracy with a MARD below 20% to be widely accepted.

The number of clinical trials of non-invasive glucose monitors has grown throughout the 21st century. While the National Institutes of Health recorded only 4 clinical investigations of the technology from 2000 to 2015, there were 16 from 2016 to 2020.

== Wave of new research and development (2020-) ==
From approximately 2020, onwards there has been increased R&D activity in the space of new NIGM solutions (particularly CGM ones) with renewed focus on approaches that had already been explored, and new ones altogether. This includes both large tech companies, such as Apple and Samsung, and startup companies.

=== Optical sensing techniques ===
Optical spectroscopy methods in continuous glucose monitoring (CGM) utilize light to measure glucose levels in the interstitial fluid or blood. These methods typically involve shining a specific wavelength of light (near-infrared, mid-infrared, or Raman) onto the skin, where it interacts with the glucose molecules. The light either gets absorbed or scattered by the glucose, and the resulting changes in the light's properties are detected and analyzed.

==== Mid-Infrared spectroscopy ====
DiaMonTech AG is a Berlin, Germany-based privately held company developing the D-Pocket, a medical device that uses infrared laser technology to scan the tissue fluid in the skin and detect glucose molecules. Short pulses of infrared light are sent to the skin, which are absorbed by the glucose molecules. This generates heat waves that are detected using its patented IRE-PTD method. The company claims a high selectivity of its method, results of a first study have been published in the Journal of Diabetes Science and Technology. In this study, a Median Absolute Relative Difference of 11.3% is claimed. DiaMonTech has announced that its envisioned follow-up product D-Sensor, will feature continuous measurements, making it a CGM though no release date has been given.

==== Near-Infrared spectroscopy ====
Apple has been working on a noninvasive CGM combining silicon photonics and optical absorption spectroscopy, that it seeks to integrate into its Apple Watch. In March 2023 it was reported to have established proof-of-concept of a noninvasive CGM. Another company working on noninvasive CGM is Masimo, which sued Apple for patent infringement in this area in 2020. Masimo has also filed new patents through its subsidiary Cercacor (pending as of September 2023) covering a joint continuous glucose monitoring and pump-closed loop delivery system.

U.S. company Rockley Photonics is building a Near-Infrared system. This approach integrates Rockley's short-wave infrared (SWIR) spectroscopy technology into its miniaturized photonic integrated circuit (PIC) chips, with the resulting mechanism aiming to be embedded into a smartwatch-style wearable device.

Lithuanian company BROLIS is another NIR Spectroscopy emerging NIGM player. Based on news reports, it developed a fully functioning prototype in 2019.

==== Raman spectroscopy ====
In 2022 Samsung announced that it would be incorporating glucose monitoring with its smartwatch with a targeted release year of 2025. It is not clear whether the watch will integrate readings from an external CGM such as Dexcom's or Abbott's, or work standalone. The company in 2020 published literature regarding the aforementioned (see above) non-invasive method it had developed with MIT scientists to engage in continuous glucose monitoring using spectroscopy. The company has filed patents related to this technology. In January 2024, Samsung gave an update affirming its NIGM ambitions but did not give a release date.

Seoul, South Korea-based start-up Apollon commenced work on a Raman CGM and secured a partnership with MIT in 2023. In 2024, it secured 2.3B won (approximately $1.5M) in pre-Series A funding for development of needle-free glucose monitoring.

Liom (formerly called Spiden) is a Swiss startup building a multi-biomarker and drug level monitoring noninvasive smartwatch wearable (using Raman spectroscopy) with continuous glucose monitoring capability as its first application. It has so far not attained regulatory approval as of October 2023. In January 2024, Liom declared it had developed a prototype, with a claimed MARD (Mean Absolute Relative Difference) value to a reference glucose measurement of approximately 9%.

In 2023, RSP Systems Denmark published data from prospective measurements with at least 15 days following calibration. the study was a home-based clinical study involving 160 subjects with diabetes, the largest study of its kind to date. Data from a subset of subjects with type 2 diabetes shoved 99.8% of measurements within A + B zones in the consensus error grid and a mean absolute relative difference of 14.3%. The full clinical study involved 160 subjects, 137 with type 1 on intensive insulin therapy or insulin pumps. The measurements form the type 1 diabetes subgroup, showed 96.5% of the points in zones A + B, while the typical indices of accuracy, the mean absolute relative difference (MARD) and RMSE, over the 15 days were 19.9% and 1.9 mmol/L, respectively. With 12,374 paired data points, the size of the dataset demonstrates the robustness of the Raman spectroscopy-based approach.

==== Pulse wave measurement ====
In 2020, Accofrisk Corporation (United Arab Emirates) announced the creation of a watch with a built-in non-invasive glucometer based on spectral detection and thermal metabolism detection technology by collecting the volumetric pulse wave signal and thermal metabolism signal on the wrist of the user's hand. In fact, the watch implements the Photoplethysmography (PPG) method. PPG is a non-invasive glucose monitoring technology that requires a light source to illuminate tissue and a photodetector to detect minute fluctuations in light intensity caused by changes in capillary volume associated with perfusion.

The watch uses an optical low-power heart rate monitor chip, the PAH8011ES (PixArt Imaging Inc.), and glucose levels are calculated by ARIA's semantic artificial intelligence, after spectral processing and pulse wave analysis.

According to the results of clinical trials in Chongqing Red Cross Hospital (Jiangbei County People's Hospital, China), the clinical validation accuracy of the non-invasive blood glucose watch reached 95.37% for type 2 diabetic patients.

=== Electromagnetic sensing techniques ===
Electromagnetic sensing for non-invasive glucose monitoring utilizes the interaction between electromagnetic waves and the glucose molecules present in the body. These techniques typically involve applying a specific radio frequency or microwave signal to the skin, which then penetrates the underlying tissues. The presence of glucose alters the dielectric properties (permittivity and conductivity) of the tissue, leading to changes in the amplitude, phase, or other characteristics of the transmitted or reflected electromagnetic waves.

Electrochemical glucose monitoring is based on the glucose oxidation reaction. Glucose oxidase is the enzyme that is specific to glucose. Glucose is oxidized by oxygen in the presence of glucose oxidase and water to make gluconolactone and hydrogen peroxide. Hydrogen peroxide is further oxidized at the electrode, producing free electrons, resulting in an electrical current proportional to the glucose concentration in an area of interest. By measuring this current, the sensor can accurately determine the glucose level.

==== Radiofrequency-based approaches ====
Haifa, Israel-based company HAGAR completed a study of its GWave non-invasive CGM, reporting high accuracy. This sensor uses radiofrequency waves to measure glucose levels in the blood. The device had not received regulatory approval anywhere as of August 2023. One of the criticisms of radiofrequency technology as a way of measuring glucose is that studies in 2019 found that glucose can only be detected in the far infrared (nanometer wavelengths), rather than radiofrequencies even in the centimeter and millimeter wavelength range, putting into question the viability of radio frequencies for measuring glucose. A second study (performed in Israel) reported a GWave prototype showed a MARD of 6.7% though Food and Drug Administration (FDA) comparator standards were not applied (the study determined accuracy (MARD) by comparing with a regular Abbott Blood Glucose Monitoring/fingerstick device as a comparator, which measures capillary blood glucose levels, not venous ones as required for FDA CGM approval).

KnowLabs is a Seattle, U.S-based company building a CGM called the Bio-RFID sensor, which works by sending radio waves through the skin to measure molecular signatures in the blood, which Know Labs' machine learning algorithms use to compute the user's blood sugar levels. The company reported that it had built a prototype, but had not attained regulatory approval as of August 2023. In March 2024, news outlets reported that the company's sensor had attained a MARD of 11.1%.

The BioXensor developed by British company BioRX uses patented radio frequency technology, alongside a multiple sensor (also capturing blood oxygen levels, ECG, respiration rate, heart rate and body temperature) approach. The company claims this enables the measurement of blood glucose levels every minute reliably, accurately, and non-invasively. BioXensor had not received regulatory approval as of June 2023.

Afon Technology, based in Wales, is developing Glucowear, a non-invasive continuous glucose monitor (CGM) using radiofrequency (RF) technology. This device, worn under a smartwatch, has the goal to monitor blood glucose in real-time. Their approach uses RF signals to detect glucose levels beneath the skin, differing from optical sensor-based methods.

Synex Medical (based in Boston, US and Toronto, Canada) uses portable magnetic resonance spectroscopy (MRS) for non-invasive glucose monitoring. Their compact devices aim to measure blood metabolites like glucose in real-time by analyzing the magnetic properties of hydrogen atoms in glucose molecules.

Another noninvasive system was attempted to be built by US company Movano Health. It envisioned a small ring placed on the arm. Movano said in 2021 that it was building the smallest ever custom radio frequency (RF)-enabled sensor designed for simultaneous blood pressure and glucose monitoring. Movano is listed as MOVE on NASDAQ. By August 2023 Movano had shifted to building sensor rings for other parameters, such as heart rate, blood oxygen levels, respiration rate, skin temperature variability, and menstrual symptom tracking.

==== Reverse iontophoresis (Electromagnetic sensing in sweat) ====
SugarBeat, built by Nemaura Medical, is a wireless non-invasive blood glucose monitoring system using a disposable skin patch. The patch connects to a rechargeable transmitter which detects blood sugar and transfers the data to a mobile app every five minutes. The patch can be used for 24 hours. Electronic currents are used to draw interstitial fluid to the surface to analyse the glucose level. SugarBeat has achieved regulatory approval in Saudi Arabia and Europe, though market penetration rates remain very low. The company declared US$503,906 in revenue for the fiscal year ending March 2022, which compares to Dexcom's more than $3 billion. As of August 2023 it had submitted a US FDA premarket approval application for sugarBEAT. Nemaura was listed on NASDAQ since January 2018 as NMRD. However, due to poor performance (a below than $35m market cap) and low trading volumes it was threatened with delisting from NASDAQ (in April 2023). It was delisted from NASDAQ January 4, 2024 and is currently trading on OTC.

=== Magnetohydrodynamic approaches ===
Glucomodicum is based in Helsinki, Finland and was founded as a spin out of the University of Helsinki. Their attempted solution uses interstitial fluid to non-invasively measure glucose levels continuously. It does not have regulatory approval. Its device is a combination of magnetohydrodynamic (MHD) technology, advanced algorithms and highly-sensitive biosensors which link to a smartphone app for data collection and reporting. It works by sending a small amount of energy through the skin to the interstitial fluid between the cells, bringing the fluid to the surface of the skin for non-invasive sample capture.

=== Eye scanning ===
Occuity, a Reading, UK-based startup is taking a different approach to noninvasive glucose monitoring, by using the eye. The company states it is developing the Occuity Indigo, which aims to measure the change in refractive index of the eye to determine the concentration of glucose in the blood.

=== Breath analysis ===
BOYDSense is a French-based startup developing a noninvasive glucose monitoring device that analyzes breath-based volatile organic compounds (VOCs). The company's device, Lassie, measures specific VOCs in the breath, which are metabolic byproducts of glucose usage in the body. Early clinical trials have demonstrated that these VOCs can reliably indicate blood glucose levels in individuals with type 2 diabetes. BOYDSense's goal is to provide a compact, affordable alternative to traditional CGMs, which rely on blood samples. The technology is currently in clinical trials, with ongoing research to refine its accuracy and algorithm.
