= IPGMER and SSKM Hospital =

Hospital and medical school in Kolkata, India

Institute of Post Graduate Medical Education and Research
- Former name: Presidency General Hospital
- Motto: Thirst for Knowledge, Heartfelt for Ailing
- Type: Public Medical school & Hospital
- Established: c. 1707; 319 years ago
- Founder: The Council of Fort William
- Accreditation: NABL
- Academic affiliations: West Bengal University of Health Sciences
- Budget: ₹970.23 crore (US$103.6 million) (2024–25)
- Director: Dr. Manimoy Bandyopadhyay
- Academic staff: 581
- Students: 1,660
- Undergraduates: 1,000
- Postgraduates: 586
- Doctoral students: 74
- Location: 244, AJC Bose Road, Bhowanipore, Kolkata, West Bengal, India; 22°32′20.39″N 88°20′27.27″E
- Campus: 34 acres (14 ha); Metropolis
- Recognition: NMC; INC; IDC
- Journal: Annals of Medical Science and Research
- Average OPD Attendance: 16,753 (2024)
- Website: ipgmer.gov.in
- Government of West Bengal

Organisation
- Type: Teaching hospital

Services
- Standards: NMC
- Emergency department: Level I Trauma Center
- Beds: 3,711

Helipads
- Helipad: No

Institute of Post-Graduate Medical Education and Research and Seth Sukhlal Karnani Memorial Hospital (abbreviated as IPGMER and SSKM Hospital), colloquially known as PGI Kolkata & P. G. Hospital, is a public medical college and Tertiary Teaching hospital located in Kolkata, India. It is a national research institute. It is a Center of Excellence in Medical Education and Research in India.

== Location ==
Located near Race Course ground and the Victoria Memorial Hall of Kolkata, its location is in the heart of Kolkata surrounded by cultural and historical landmarks like the Nandan complex, Rabindra Sadan, Academy of Fine Arts the Saint Paul's Cathedral, the Red Road and the Indian Museum. It faces the Maidan of Kolkata - a hot-spot for political rallies in the city. The Bangur Institute of Neurosciences is adjacent and functionally attached to this institution.

== History ==
The first hospital in Calcutta was built in the premises of the Old Fort at Gerstein Place in 1707. The Council of Fort William constructed this hospital. Initially built for the Europeans till 1770, this hospital was then known as the Presidency Hospital, after the Presidency of Calcutta and due to its proximity to the Presidency Jail of Calcutta. Later, it came to be known as the Presidency General Hospital or P.G. Hospital for short - the name which is still commonly used. In independent India, the hospital was renamed as Seth Sukhlal Karnani Memorial Hospital in 1954 after great philanthropist of Calcutta, Sukhlal Karnani.

P.G. Hospital was established in 1707. The East India Company (Calcutta Council) purchased the plot of land, which was a gardenhouse (in 1768) from Rev. John Zacharias Kiernander at a cost of Rs. 98900.00 along with an adjoining plot belonging to a Bengali gentleman.

Rev. John Zacharias Kiernander came to Bengal from Southern India in 1758 to work as the first Protestant missionary in Calcutta. The well known Old Mission Church (Bath Tephillah -'the House of Prayer'), built by him was the earliest favourite place of Protestant worship in Mission Row at his own expense at a cost of Rs. 65,000 and established a mission school in the rear of the Church in 1767. The Presidency General Hospital was established near the St. John's Church (presently, in 1, Garstin Place and in its adjoining areas) which was in famous as a hellish side.

According to Mrs. Bleshinden, "It was a veritable death-trap to those unfortunate who were driven to seek its shelter and had been the subject of constant complaint for years. At last in 1768. a house was purchased from a native gentleman for the purpose of a hospital. It stood to the south of the Maidan, practically in the country. This house with various alterations and additions, including two other buildings created in 1795 remained in us as the Presidency General Hospital".

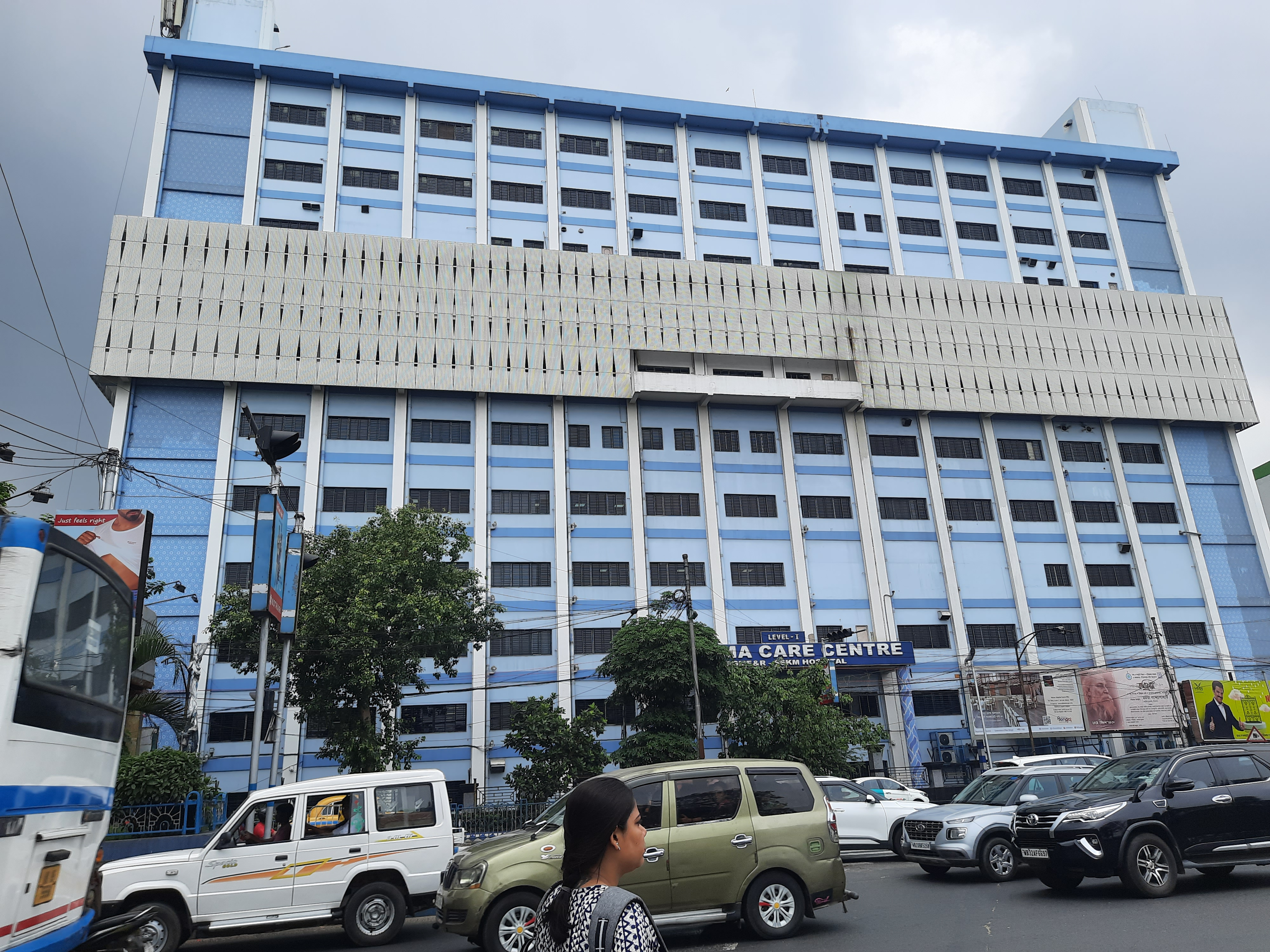
Trauma care centre

The construction of the hospital started after the Government occupied the land on 20 June 1769. The west wing was completed on 2 April 1770 and the east wing on 2 June 1770. Admission of the patients started on 22 April 1770.

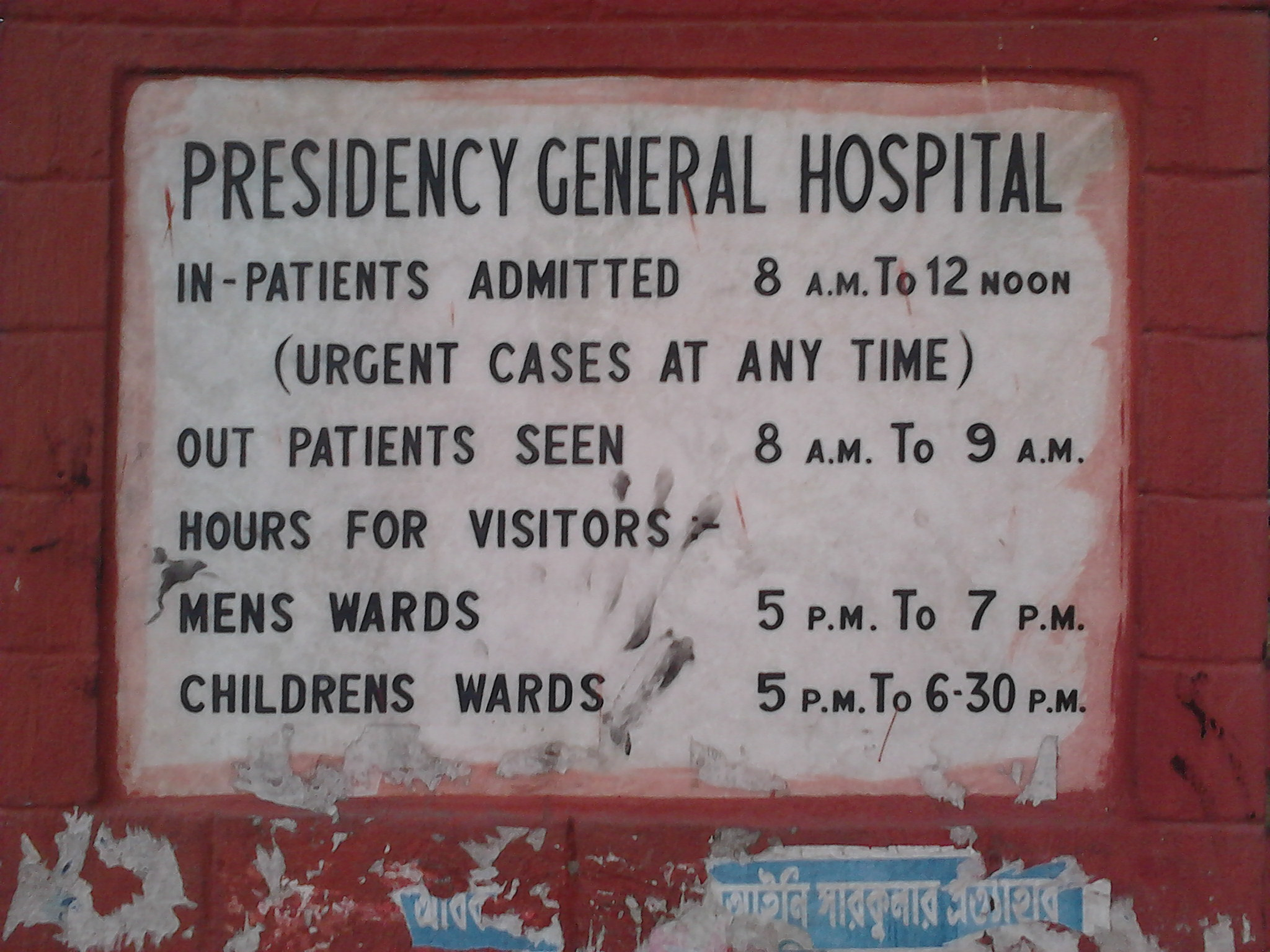
The plaque of the Presidency General Hospital, Kolkata.

The present Main Block was constructed between 1901 and 1902; the Woodburn Block, Administrative Building and Physiotherapy Building were built between 1902 and 1908. For the construction of the Woodburn Block, the total expense was Rs. 3.5 lakhs.

This hospital is the oldest general hospital in India, for the practice of modern medicine and for meaningful research.

It is mentioned in the book "The handbook of travellers in India, Pakistan, Nepal, Bangladesh & Sri Lanka" by L. F. Rushbrook Williams that, "On the Lower Circular Road, South of Victoria Memorial is the Presidency General Hospital (1768), formerly intended for Europeans. In its place, the European business community has established a well-found clinic of his own. The Station military hospital, conspicuous by its pillared frontage, was (1773) the courthouse of Sardar Dewani Adalat, the Chief Provincial Court of Appeal, which ceased to exist on the establishment of the High Court in 1862". From this record, it is quite evident that PG Hospital is a part of world heritage, I am thankful to Calcutta Municipal Corporation and the Govt. of West Bengal for declaring heritage status to this institution in response to my appeal dated 16.1.1998.

Sir Ronald Ross made his epoch-making-discovery of "Cycle of Malarial Parasite" in this hospital and was awarded Nobel Prize in Medicine and Physiology on 10 December 1902. He also received the Barkley Bronze Memorial Medal from the Asiatic Society, Calcutta on 20 May 1903. Sir Ronald Ross is the first Indian (born at Almora) Nobel laureate. After his retirement from service on 31 July 1899, he visited PG Hospital in January 1927, when the "Gate of Commemoration" bearing his statue and poem on the plaque was unveiled by Lord Lytton.

Michael Madhusudan Dutta was the first native Indian to be admitted to this hospital on 22 June 1873, and he died here on 29 June 1873.

Dr. Surendranath Ghosh was the first native Indian doctor to be appointed in PG Hospital. The first floor of the Woodburn Block was renamed as Dr. S. N. Ghosh Ward, by the then Chief minister Hon'ble Jyoti Basu, following the publication of the article in PG Bulletin, along with a photograph of Dr. Ghosh and facsimile of his diary page. The first Indian doctor of the hospital has been bestowed with honour.

Jawaharlal Nehru inaugurating IPGMER on 16 January 1957

In 1957, an offer was made to transform what is now SSKM Hospital into an institute similar to the All India Institute of Medical Sciences in New Delhi.The then chief minister of West Bengal, Bidhan Chandra Roy, turned down the offer. P.G. Hospital was the first Post Graduate Medical Institute in Eastern India in 1957 when it hospital came to be known as The Institute of Post Graduate Medical Education & Research (IPGMER). It was inaugurated by Pandit Jawahar Lal Nehru, the then Prime Minister of India, on 16 January 1957.

Undergraduate medical training started here with 50 number of seats rather late in 2004 after clearance from the Medical Council Of India (now National Medical Commission).

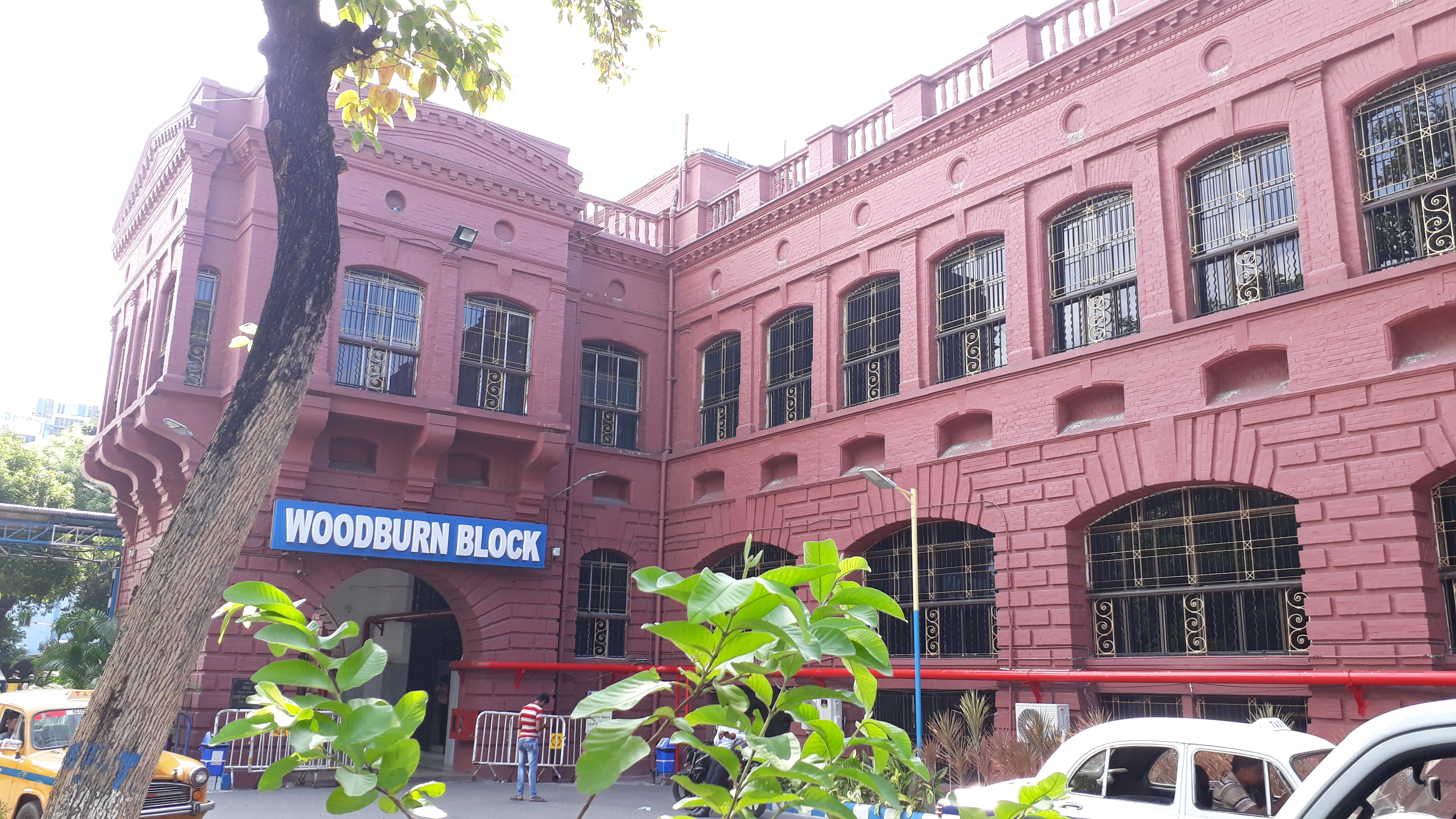
The Heritage Woodburn Block, named after sir John Woodburn

The erstwhile Chief minister, Hon'ble Jyoti Basu had pledged his body to the advancement of medical science. After his demise, honoring his wishes, his body was handed over to the college authorities. This move has triggered a wave of body donations in the state.

=== Recent History ===
In 2015, MCI threatened to scrap the DM-Neonatology course due to lack of qualified faculty members for teaching the subject.

West Bengal's 1st free IVF unit at IPGMER.

In November 2021, Union Ministry of Health and Family Welfare selected IPGMER as one of 8 Centres of Excellence (CoEs) for Rare Diseases, under the National Policy for Rare Diseases (NPRD), 2021.

The institute has started telemedicine-gastroenterology services for patients from districts and remote areas since October 2022.

In July 2023, the institution took an initiative called Medimpact to provide free online access to teaching sessions of faculty members attached with IPGMER-Kolkata, for medical students from across the globe. separated head and neck surgery department with cutting edege fecilities started operation from 2025.

In March 2025 the launch of robotic surgery at IPGMER represents a significant leap forward in medical technology in Eastern India, enhancing the quality of care available to patients. This initiative not only reflects the commitment of IPGMER to improve healthcare services but also positions it as a leader in adopting innovative medical practices.

== Rankings ==
University rankings

Global – Overall
- USNWR Global: 535 (2024)

Academic rankings

Medical – India
- NIRF (2022): 21
- NIRF (2023): 24
- NIRF (2024): 22

IPGMER ranked 23 in medical Section in India in 2025 by National Institutional Ranking Framework.

== Layout ==
One end of the premises contains various outpatient departments, wards and clinics, while the other comprises the administrative and college buildings for medical and paramedical students. The wards include Curzon, Victoria, Alexander, etc. in the Main block, the O&G blocks. Other services are the out patient departments and wards of Chest, Cancer, Nephrology, etc. The teaching buildings include the UCM, Ronald Ross, Psychiatry building, Old Emergency Building, housing lecture theaters, museums and laboratories.

Academic building is in the heart of hospital campus. It was established in 2014.

The medical college Library is situated in the seventh floor. There are two separate sections of library for the UG and PG students.

HOSTEL FACILITY:

There are three hostels for undergraduates and one hostel for postgraduate students, all inside the college campus.

There are separate boys' and girls' hostels. A newly constructed boys hostel named NEW MBBS BOYS HOSTEL is inside the PG campus and one UG hostel named MAIN HOSTEL is inside the college campus. A newly constructed UG girls' hostel is adjacent to the Academic building .

The cultural fest of IPGME&R and SSKM Hospital is CRUX which is held annually around August–September.

== Organization and administration ==
It is currently affiliated to the West Bengal University of Health Sciences. From 1857 to 2003, it was affiliated with the historic University of Calcutta. It is funded and run by the Government of West Bengal. Affiliated to State Medical Faculty of West Bengal for Paramedical education.

Directors
- Maj. Gen. (Dr.) A.K. Gupta, 1958 – 1963
- Dr. C.L. Mukherjee, 1963–1965
- Dr. M.M. Mukherjee, 1965–1968
- Dr. A.K. Basu, 1968–1969
- Dr. K.C. Basu Mallick, 1969–1972
- Dr. D.P. Basu, 1972–1974
- Dr. M.K. Chhetri, 1974–1977
- Dr. S.R. Mukherjee, 1977–1977
- Dr. K.P. Sengupta, 1977–1980
- Dr. S.K. Sarkar, 1980–1982
- Dr. S.C. Lahiri, 1982–1983
- Dr. Ajita Chakraborty, 1983–1984
- Dr. R.N. Roy, 1984–1986
- Dr. P. Majumdar, 1986–1988
- Dr. A.K. Chandra, 1988–1990
- Dr. D. Sen, 1990–1996
- Dr. S. Banerjee, 1996–1997
- Dr. Dahlia Banerjee, 1997–1999
- Dr. A.K. Maity, 1999–2003
- Dr. B.D. Banerjee, 2003–2004
- Dr. Prabir K. Sur, 2004–2007
- Dr. Pradip Kumar Deb, 2007–2008
- Dr. Pradip Kumar Mitra, 2008–2015
- Dr. Manju Banerjee, 2015–2017
- Dr. Ajay Kumar Ray, 2017–2018
- Dr. Manimoy Bandhopadhyay, 2018–Incumbent

== Campuses ==
On 2019, Chief Minister Mamata Banerjee inaugurated a 244-bed level-1 Trauma Care Centre at IPGMER. It has been built on the lines of a unit at AIIMS New Delhi, to cater to trauma patients.

=== Cancer care Hub ===
In June 2021 Chief Minister Mamata Banerjee announced that Government of West Bengal has tied up with Tata Memorial Centre, Mumbai to set up 2 state-of-the-art cancer hospitals in West Bengal - one unit will be in SSKM Hospital campus, and the other will be in North Bengal Medical College and Hospital. Chemotherapy daycare services have been started at PG's Annex-6, Kolkata Police Hospital since April 2022. Initially, 32 beds can serve 50 patients daily, said doctors at the radiotherapy department of PG. Chemotherapy for breast, lung, head and neck, cervical cancer is being given at the day-care center of the police hospital. Oncopathology department of the institute has been accredited by the National Accreditation Board for Testing and Calibration Laboratories (NABL). This is the first time in eastern India that a state government hospital has got this recognition. SSKM has been working with Mumbai's Tata Memorial Hospital for the last two years to develop state-of-the-art cancer treatment facilities in the state.

Cancer Care Hub

Organisation
- Type: Specialist

Services
- Beds: 154
- Speciality: Oncology

History
- Opened: 19 November 2022; 4 years ago

=== Medical units ===
- Institute of Psychiatry
- Bangur Institute of Neurosciences
- Sambhunath Pandit Hospital
- Ramrikdas Haralanka Hospital
- PG Polyclinic
- Kidderpore Maternity Home
- Kolkata Police Hospital

== Academics ==
=== Academic Departments ===
- Anaesthesiology
- Anatomy
- Biochemistry
- Cardiology
- Cardiac Anesthesiology
- Cardiothoracic & Vascular surgery
- Chest medicine (Pulmonology)
- Critical Care Medicine
- Community Medicine
- Dentistry
- Dermatology
- Emergency medicine
- Endocrinology & Metabolism
- ENT (Otorhinolaryngology)
- Forensic & state medicine
- Gastroenterology
- General surgery
- Genomics
- Gynecology & Obstetrics
- Infectious Diseases
- Medicine
- Microbiology
- Neonatology
- Nephrology
- Neuro-anaesthesiology
- Neurology (Neuromedicine)
- Neurosurgery
- Nuclear & Experimental Medical Sciences
- Nursing
- Ophthalmology (Eye)
- Orthopaedic surgery
- Pathology
- Paediatric Medicine
- Paediatric surgery
- Pharmacology
- Physical medicine and rehabilitation
- Physiology
- Plastic and Reconstructive Surgery
- Psychiatry
- Radiodiagnosis
- Radiotherapy
- Respiratory Medicine
- Surgical oncology
- Urology
- Rheumatology and Clinical Immunology

=== Center of Excellences ===
- Bangur Institute of Neurosciences
- INS Sciences Cardiology
- Institute of Psychiatry
- Institute of Otorhinolaryngology & Head Neck Surgery
- School of Digestive and Liver Diseases
- School of Physical Medicine and Rehabilitation
- Center of Excellence in Reproductive Medicine

=== Achievements and Innovations ===
In December 2021, Department by Surgical Gastroenterology led by Dr Abhijit Chowdhury, Dr.Sukanta Ray, Dr. Somak Das and Dr Tuhin Subhra Mandal conducted a liver transplant with its own team of doctors for the first time since the state-run hospital began liver transplant in 2009.

From 19 April 2022, West Bengal's first fertility center in a government hospital has started functioning at IPGMER. The center of excellence in reproductive medicine opened its doors to outdoor patients.

In January 2023, IPGMER's Department of Endocrinology has developed a non-invasive diagnostic test that can detect if a thyroid tumour is malignant or benign. It can also reveal the sub-type of the cancer.

Dr. Sujoy Ghosh, an endocrinologist at SSKM Hospital in Kolkata, has recently been honored with the ISPAD 2025 Award for his innovative contributions to pediatric diabetes care, specifically through the development of the "Bengal model."

== See also ==
- Medical College Kolkata
- Calcutta National Medical College
- All India Institute of Medical Sciences
- National Institute for Research in Bacterial Infections
- Nil Ratan Sarkar Medical College and Hospital
- Calcutta School of Tropical Medicine
