= Gerold Grodsky =

American scientist (1927–2022)

Gerold Grodsky (1927–2022) was an American professor of biochemistry, biophysics, and medicine at the University of California, San Francisco UCSF Diabetes Center, as well as a diabetes researcher. He is most known for his contributions to the modern artificial pancreas.

== Education ==
Gerold Grodsky matriculated at the University of Illinois at Urbana–Champaign, earning his bachelor's degree in biochemistry in 1947 and his master's in biochemistry in 1948. He earned his doctorate in biochemistry at the University of California, Berkeley in 1955. He went on to work as a postdoctoral fellow at University of Cambridge.

== Career ==
In 1955, after completing his postdoctoral work at Cambridge, Grodsky joined the biochemistry faculty at the University of California, San Francisco, and became the associate research director of the Metabolic Research Unit under Peter Forsham. Later, Grodsky spent almost thirty years as Professor of Biochemisry and Medicine with the UCSF Diabetes Center at UCSF, researching critical questions about the production, synthesis, and secretion of insulin by the pancreas.

In 1960, to further understand the forms of insulin release, Grodsky engineered the first precipitating radioimmunoassay of insulin. In 1963, Grodsky and his laboratory were the first to isolate an animal pancreas to study the secretion of insulin outside the body. Later in the 1960s, Grodsky's team first observed that the pancreas appears to release insulin in distinct phases. They went on to publish many studies in support of this theory, which informed the modern scientific understanding of the process of insulin secretion.

In 1970, Grodsky's team conducted some of the earliest research on the release of insulin from pancreatic islets.

== Research work ==
Grodsky's study of the perfused pancreas in the 1960s, and then of isolated pancreatic islets in the 1970s, resulted in the discovery that insulin is released from the pancreas in two separate phases, one "fast" and one "slow." This biphasic understanding eventually evolved to accommodate a third, even slower phase of insulin release. These discoveries were significant because they implied that it was not possible to replicate the pancreas's function through insulin injections alone, since injections deliver the insulin all at once. The need was thus identified for a method of pumping insulin into the body in stages. The result was the artificial pancreas, to whose development and refinement Grodsky contributed substantially throughout his career.

== Other research ==
Grodsky has researched and published extensively on a number of topics relating to insulin, factors affecting insulin release, and the role of insulin in the development of diabetes. His research topics have included the function of glucose metabolism in the induction of insulin secretion; the effects of reactive oxygen species in diabetes; the dependency of the release of insulin by the pancreas on calcium, Vitamin D, and other micronutrients; the physiology of pancreatic beta cells; and the impact of aspartic acid and glutamic acid on insulin storage, among others. In 2002, Grodsky published, with Joseph L. Evans, et al., a unified hypothesis of type 2 diabetes.

== Professional activities ==
Grodsky has served as visiting professor at Paris Diderot University and at the University of Geneva. From 1980 to 1983 he was research chair of the advisory board to the Secretary of the United States Department of Health and Human Services on diabetes. He has published approximately 250 articles in scientific journals. He also co-founded the journal Diabetes Technology and Therapeutics and was a member of the editorial board of the Journal of Diabetes Science and Technology.

Grodsky served on the scientific advisory boards of several organizations including the nonprofit Juvenile Diabetes Foundation. He continued to work at the University of California, San Francisco, where one of his major roles was to advise relating to research on the development and function of the insulin-producing islet beta cell.

== Awards and honors ==
- David Rumbough Scientific Award, Juvenile Diabetes Foundation International, 1983
- Merit Award, National Institutes of Health, 1986
- Lifetime Achievement Award, The University of California Diabetes Center, San Francisco, 2009
- Paul Lacy Prize, US Midwestern Islet Group, 2013
- In 1994, the Juvenile Diabetes Foundation endowed an annual prize, the Gerold Grodsky Basic Research Scientist Award, in Grodsky's honor.
- In the 1984 issue of Current Contents, Grodsky was named among the 1,000 most-cited scientists in the world. In 2004, the Western Regional Islet Group created the Gerold Grodsky Lectureship to be presented annually. UCSF, in 2010, created the Gerold Grodsky, PhD Chair in Diabetes Research.
