= Ethel Codner =

Professor and pediatric endocrinologist

- Born: February 4, 1966 (age 60); Santiago, Chile
- Occupations: Pediatric endocrinologist and academic

Academic background
- Education: Medical Degree; Specialization in Pediatric Endocrinology
- Alma mater: Pontifical Catholic University of Chile; University of Chile

Academic work
- Institutions: University of Chile

Ethel Codner is a pediatric endocrinologist and academic. She is a full professor in the Institute of Maternal and Child Research at the University of Chile.

Codner has conducted research in the areas of pediatric endocrinology, reproductive endocrinology, type 1 diabetes, and adolescent ovarian function. She received the first Early Career Award from the International Society for Pediatric and Adolescent Diabetes (ISPAD) in 2006 and was named among the 100 Women Leaders of 2017 by El Mercurio.

== Education ==
Codner earned a medical degree from the Pontifical Catholic University of Chile in 1991. She completed her specialization in pediatrics in 1994 and in pediatric endocrinology in 1997 at the University of Chile.

== Career ==
Codner began her academic career in 2000 at the Institute of Maternal and Child Research at the University of Chile, where she has held the title of full professor since 2014, and also practices as a medical specialist. She was the director of the Chilean Society of Endocrinology and Diabetes from 2011 to 2012, president of the Latin American Society of Pediatric Endocrinology in 2015, and co-editor of the ISPAD guidelines for the care of diabetes in children and adolescents in 2018 and 2022.

== Research ==
Codner's research has focused on the impact of diabetes on the female reproductive process, especially during puberty, hyperandrogenism, ovarian function, and genetics. Her work characterized how the presence of type 1 diabetes affects ovulation, menses, and hyperandrogenism. She has also studied the age of normal puberty in healthy children, and also in those living with type 1 diabetes.

Codner's work linked type 1 diabetes with polyendocrine metabolic ovarian syndrome (PMOS), speculating that the high systemic doses of insulin without portal delivery can be part of the explanation for the association, and discovered that female offspring of PMOS women had increased Anti-Müllerian hormone (AMH) during infancy and early childhood. Building upon this, she indicated that external systemic insulin therapy in women with insulin-dependent type 1 diabetes tends to create PMOS. She examined 42 women with type 1 diabetes and 38 control subjects matched for age and BMI for PMOS, using the ESHRE/ASRM diagnostic criteria. Her findings proposed that women with type 1 diabetes were presented with more signs of PMOS, such as higher androgens and menstrual disturbances. She also showed that young women exhibit findings suggestive of polycystic ovarian morphology (PCOM) in high prevalence, reflecting a usual variation of ovarian morphology and larger ovarian volumes during early adolescence.

In collaborative research, Codner evaluated the genetic aspects and management of neonatal diabetes. She has treated young infants with neonatal diabetes with high-dose sulfonylureas. In an ISPAD publication, she and co-authors recommended an individualized A1C goal of 7.0% for patients aged 25 or younger who have access to care, and 7.5% for those with increased risk of hypoglycemia or reduced accessibility to diabetes control facilities.

== Awards and honors ==
- 2006 – Early Career Award, International Society of Pediatric and Adolescent Diabetes
- 2010 – Julio Santiago Award, Latin American Diabetes Association
- 2017 – 100 Women Leaders, El Mercurio
- 2021 – Medical Research Award, Chilean Academy of Medicine
- 2024 – Member, Chilean Academy of Medicine

== Selected articles ==
- Pearson, Ewan R.; Flechtner, Isabelle; Njølstad, Pål R.; Malecki, Maciej T.; Flanagan, Sarah E.; Larkin, Brian; et al. (2006). "Switching from insulin to oral sulfonylureas in patients with diabetes due to Kir6.2 mutations". New England Journal of Medicine. 355 (5): 467–477. doi:10.1056/NEJMoa061759. PMID 16885550.
- Ibáñez, Lourdes; Oberfield, Sharon E.; Witchel, Selma; Auchus, Richard J.; Chang, R. Jeffrey; Codner, Ethel; et al. (2017). "An International Consortium Update: Pathophysiology, Diagnosis, and Treatment of Polycystic Ovarian Syndrome in Adolescence". Hormone Research in Paediatrics. 88 (6): 371–395. doi:10.1159/000479371. hdl:10668/11819. PMID 29156452.
- Wolfsdorf, Joseph I.; Glaser, Nicole; Agus, Michael; Fritsch, Maria; Hanas, Ragnar; Rewers, Arleta; Sperling, Mark A.; Codner, Ethel (2018). "ISPAD Clinical Practice Consensus Guidelines 2018: Diabetic ketoacidosis and the hyperglycemic hyperosmolar state". Pediatric Diabetes. 19 (S27): 155–177. doi:10.1111/pedi.12701. PMID 29900641.
- DiMeglio, Linda A.; Acerini, Carlo L.; Codner, Ethel; Craig, Maria E.; Hofer, Sabine E.; Pillay, Kubendran; Maahs, David M. (2018). "ISPAD Clinical Practice Consensus Guidelines 2018: Glycemic control targets and glucose monitoring for children, adolescents, and young adults with diabetes". Pediatric Diabetes. 19 (S27): 105–114. doi:10.1111/pedi.12737. hdl:1805/19595. PMID 30058221.
- Dhatariya, Ketan K.; Glaser, Nicole S.; Codner, Ethel; Umpierrez, Guillermo E. (2020). "Diabetic ketoacidosis". Nature Reviews Disease Primers. 6 (1): 40. doi:10.1038/s41572-020-0165-1. PMID 32409703.
