= Lutz Heinemann =

German pharmacology professor (born 1954)

- Born: 1954 (age 71–72)
- Education: University of Applied Sciences, Düsseldorf; Heinrich Heine University Düsseldorf
- Scientific career
- Fields: Insulin pharmacology Diabetes technology
- Workplaces: Heinrich Heine University Düsseldorf

Lutz Heinemann (born 1954) is a German biologist whose research is focused on insulin pharmacology and diabetes technology.

He graduated with a degree in process engineering from the University of Applied Sciences, Düsseldorf, Germany, in 1976, and qualified as a biologist at the Heinrich Heine University Düsseldorf in 1982. He worked as a faculty member at the Heinrich Heine University Düsseldorf.

He has been Managing Editor of the Journal of Diabetes Science and Technology since 2011.

He received an award for Leadership in Diabetes Technology from the Diabetes Technology Society in 2007, and was awarded the Artificial Pancreas Research Award from the Diabetes Technology Society in 2012. He has an h-index of 81 according to Google Scholar.
