= Bangur Institute of Neurosciences =

Government-run hospital in West Bengal, India

- IPGMER and SSKM Hospital
- Hospital within West Bengal state

Geography
- Location: Bhowanipore, Kolkata, West Bengal, India
- Coordinates: 22.53779°N 88.34048°E

Organisation
- Affiliated university: WBUHS

History
- Founded: 10 June 1962; 64 years ago

Links
- Lists: Hospitals in India

Bangur Institute of Neurosciences, (Note: Name according to IPGMER website) also known as the Bangur Institute of Neurology and abbreviated BIN, is a government-run apex superspeciality institute/hospital located at 52/1A, Sambhu Nath Pandit Street, Bhawanipur, Kolkata, West Bengal.B.l.N. was founded in 1970 in the newly constructed two-storeyed building with twenty indoor bed facilities sanctioned by the Government of West Bengal as an institution for postgraduate training and research in the different disciplines of the speciality of neurological sciences.The institute is adjacent to and functionally attached to IPGMER and SSKM Hospital. The facilities of the institution were further expanded in 1975 and its indoor bed strength was raised from 20 to 70, out of which 38 beds were allotted to the Department of Neurosurgery. The institute is affiliated to the West Bengal University of Health Science.

This is a government-sponsored neurological institute and a training centre in the field of neuroscience in West Bengal. Patients are regularly referred here from various hospitals in West Bengal and adjoining states. This hospital's research activities include studies into strokes, cognitive neuroscience, movement disorders, epilepsy, neuromuscular conditions (myasthenia), developmental disorders of the brain, Wilson's disease, electrophysiology, botulinium toxin, and neurogenetics.

== Controversies ==
Due to an inadequacy in the number of beds, patients have complained that even critical patients are often refused admission.

On 26 May 2011, Shyamapada Gorai, then director of BIN was suspended with charges of misconduct, insubordination and non-co-operation. This was one of the first administrative actions taken by Chief Minister of West Bengal, Mamata Banerjee. Even after the surprise visit of the Chief Minister, the situation did not improve. According to a report published in The Telegraph (Calcutta) in June 2012, "A year and a fortnight after chief minister Mamata Banerjee suspended Shyamapada Ghorai from the post of Bangur Institute of Neuroscience (BIN) director – one of her first administrative actions since assuming office."
