= Diabetes Technology Society =

Nonprofit organization in the United States

Diabetes Technology Society (DTS) is a nonprofit organization that promotes the use of new technology to assist patients living with diabetes.

== Founded ==
It was established in 2001 by David C. Klonoff (Mills Peninsula Health Services).

== Activities ==
Some of the educational objectives discussed during these conferences include:

- The understanding of cybersecurity and its relation to the medical device industry, specifically diabetes devices
- Go over the new technology being implemented to help in the release of the artificial pancreas into the market
- Discuss continuous glucose monitor and their benefits in comparison to self-monitoring of blood glucose
- Identify new insulin products (like Inhaled insulin, biosimilar insulin, glucose responsive insulin). Also, discuss how global warming has an effect on insulin stability
- Go over insulin pump therapy
- Discuss social media and its effects on benefiting managing diabetes
- Successfully understand how mobile apps could benefit managing diabetes
- Identify the new treatments available in the market for "Diabetic foot" and go over future treatments for diabetic limb salvage and prevention

== Achievements ==
In 2013, DTS gained support from the Food and Drug Administration for a proposed post-market surveillance system to test the accuracy and quality of self-monitoring of blood glucose systems. In 2014, they launched the surveillance program.

== Conferences ==
DTS is responsible for organizing three scientific conferences each year. They are:

- Diabetes Technology Meeting
- Clinical Diabetes Technology Meeting
- European Clinical Diabetes Technology Meeting

== Publishing ==
The bi-monthly peer-reviewed medical journal, Journal of Diabetes Science and Technology, is published by SAGE Publications on behalf of Diabetes Technology Society.

== See also ==
- Diabetes and Inflammation Laboratory
