= GlySens ICGM =

GlySens Incorporated
- Company type: Private
- Industry: Health Care and Social Assistance
- Founded: 1998; 28 years ago
- Founder: Joseph Y. Lucisano & David A. Gough
- Headquarters: M H H private, U.S.
- Products: ICGM System
- Revenue: $2.5 - 5 million
- Owner: Privately Owned
- Number of employees: 49
- Website: www.glysens.com

GlySens, a biomedical technology company, is a privately owned corporation developing a long term internal continuous glucose monitor in order to effectively manage and observe glucose levels in real time. In preclinical testing, the system was evaluated for operational performance over an 18-month period. GlySens Incorporated was founded in 1998 by David A. Gough and Joseph Lucisano, a bioengineering graduate at the University of California, San Diego. The implanted continuous glucose monitoring system uses an internal sensor equipped with electrochemical detectors to measure glucose readings via a chemical reaction between enzymes and oxygen.

== Technology ==
The technology that goes into the ICGM system consists of two parts. Primarily is the internal sensor which utilizes chemical reactions to determine blood glucose levels. Additionally, an external receiver is used to display glucose readings and patterns in real-time.

=== Internal sensor ===
An internal glucose sensor, measuring at 38 mm across and 16 mm thick. The implant consists of an integrated glucose sensor with signal conditioning circuits, a wireless communications circuit, and a 1-year lifetime battery, all housed in a hermetically sealed (airtight) titanium housing. The sensor is surgically implanted under the skin, at the waist or upper arm, and continuously monitors the glucose levels in the subcutaneous (under the skin) tissue. Data is then relayed to the receiver via wireless telemetry, the automatic measurement and transmission of data by wire, radio, or other means from remote sources. The GlySens ICGM sensor measures glucose by detecting oxygen consumption, contrasting with traditional continuous glucose monitors that measure hydrogen peroxide or electrical currents directly. It has an outer membrane with electrochemical detectors primed with enzymes to interact with the oxygen. The extent of the enzyme reaction and the concentration of glucose can be calculated by measuring the amount of remaining oxygen from the enzyme reaction. The sensor includes automated diagnostic system checks. The sensor may also have applications for glucose monitoring in type 2 diabetes including caloric and activity management, and prevention of type 2 diabetes in susceptible individuals.

=== External receiver ===
The monitor provides a digital readout and graphical display of the glucose levels, alerting the user to hypoglycemic and hyperglycemic glucose levels, trending patterns and a series of directional buttons to access settings, history and calibration. Calibrating the receiver and sensor is necessary in order to ensure accurate readings which requires a transdermal blood sample to be manually entered into the receiver.

== Competition ==
The two primary competitors of GlySens include: DexCom and Medtronic. These external systems utilize subcutaneous wire sensors that require replacement at weekly intervals, contrasting with long-term fully implantable designs.

== Studies ==
Science Translational Medicine reported success on long-term glucose monitoring with the sensor-telemetry system implanted in the tissues of pigs. Monitoring was carried out while the pigs were initially non-diabetic and continued for 6 months after the pigs had been made diabetic by administration of a laboratory drug. Following animal testing, a clinical trial involving human subjects began in January 2015. The first round of human trials includes a group of 20 individuals, both male and female, from the age of 21 to 65 years old. Each subject was implanted with the GlySens ICGM monitor under the skin of the upper arm and monitored over the course of 18 months. As of clinical updates tracking the initial trial sequence, the system has completed its initial human safety testing phase.
