= Journal of Hospital Infection =

- Discipline: Medicine
- Language: English
- Edited by: Nik Mahida

Publication details
- History: 1980–present
- Publisher: Elsevier (United Kingdom)
- Frequency: monthly
- Impact factor: 6.9 (2022)

Standard abbreviations
- ISO 4: J. Hosp. Infect.

Indexing
- ISSN: 0195-6701 (print); 1532-2939 (web)
- OCLC no.: 66962671

Links
- Journal homepage

The Journal of Hospital Infection is a peer-reviewed medical journal published by Elsevier on behalf of the Healthcare Infection Society. The journal publishes articles describing original research on epidemiology, healthcare, and antimicrobial resistance.

According to the 2018 Journal Citation Reports, the journal has a 2022 impact factor of 6.9. The journal was established in 1980 and the editor-in-chief is Dr Nik Mahida.
