= Pediatric Diabetes =

- Discipline: Diabetology, pediatrics, pediatric endocrinology
- Language: English

Publication details
- History: 2000-present
- Publisher: International Society for Pediatric and Adolescent Diabetes, (Munksgaard) (Denmark)

Standard abbreviations
- ISO 4: Pediatr. Diabetes

Indexing
- ISSN: 1399-543X (print); 1399-5448 (web)
- OCLC no.: 44480851

Pediatric Diabetes is a peer-reviewed medical journal published on behalf of the International Society for Pediatric and Adolescent Diabetes (ISPAD). The journal publishes research and review articles related to diabetes mellitus and related metabolic disorders in children and adolescents.
