= Dermal patch =

Medicated adhesive patch delivers medication into the skin

A dermal patch or skin patch is a medicated adhesive patch placed on human skin to deliver a medication into the skin. This is in contrast to a transdermal patch, which delivers the medication through the skin and into the bloodstream.

== Popular uses ==
- Flector (diclofenac epolamine) patch is an NSAID topical patch for the treatment of acute pain due to minor strains, sprains, and contusions. It is also being used in the treatment of pain and inflammation for chronic conditions benefiting from NSAIDs, including fibromyalgia and arthritis.
- Lidocaine patches, marketed as Lidoderm, relieve the peripheral pain of shingles (herpes zoster). It became commonly used off-label, for pain from acute injuries and chronic pain, although limited by its requirement to be removed for 12 hours, after 12 hours of use.
- Some experimental studies investigate the use of ceramic dermal patches for local antibiotic delivery to contaminated commercial skin graft patches, and antibiotic dermal patches to deliver local antibiotic to the gum after dental surgery.

== Innovative biomaterials ==
=== Silks ===
==== Spider silk ====
===== Research =====
In 2016, a study from the University of Nottingham was published describing the first synthetic spider silk that is functionally identical to naturally spun spider silk. Using non-natural methionine analog L-azidohomoalanine (L-Aha) and genetically modified E-Coli cells, self-assembling proteins under the conditions needed to create the filament were produced. These conditions had been researched years earlier by J. Johansson and co-workers studying the production of spider silk proteins. The proteins used in the study are a miniaturized version of the silk monomers found in nature that behave the same way; because of the modifications, they were able to express functionalized regions of the protein 4RepCT, which is a self-assembling recombinant dragline silk protein, derived from the nursery-web spider along the axis of the filament.

===== Methods =====
Methods of functionalizing the 4RepCT protein have been successful, but not in the way of reliably producing a stable protein functionalization in biologic environments that can also be tuned and modified. Genetic fusion of functional peptide sequences to silk genes and chemical conjugation of functional molecules onto amino acid side chains are the only two methods currently known to achieve a functionalized 4RepCT protein with tunable functionality. The first approach has the advantage that post-translational manipulation of the silk is minimized. Unfortunately, genetic manipulation is challenging due to the high GC (guanine-cytosine) content of the gene which leads to transcription errors. This method also limits the prevalence of functional binding sites to a single ligand-binding site per 25 kDa 4RepCT silk protein. Large adaptor proteins such as antibodies can be used to display more binding sites, but it isn't considered a feasible solution. This method has been shown to produce 4RepCT proteins that have a higher cell adhesion than natural spidroin proteins and have varied antimicrobial properties. The second method, chemical modification of the silk proteins should result in the covalent attachment of several copies of a wide range of organic and organometallic ligands using robust or sensitive linkers depending on the application. The challenge with this method is it is difficult to make the modification of the 4RepCT protein site-specific. Specific site targeting requires the residues to also be modified to be accessible and chemically bioorthogonal to the rest of the silk protein. Cytosine residues are commonly used for this type of conjugation through a Michael addition, but they tend to undergo exchange reactions which makes them unstable for long durations in a biological environment. These two methods are rather outdated but have been useful in validating the fact that 4RepCT can be tuned in the important areas of cellular adhesion, antimicrobial potency, and the type of molecule or drug attached to it.

Later azide functional groups were conjugated to the N-terminal of a dragline silk protein using EDC/NHS coupling, yielding glycopolymer-conjugated films with enhanced cell adhesion and DNA-silk chimeras with controllable micro-architectures. Armed with this, the researchers in this study investigated the incorporation of 3 L-Aha residues into 4RepCT, yielding $4RepCT^{3Aha}$. The azide side chains of L-Aha allow highly specific and efficient site-specific conjugation to a lot different of functional molecules via Staudinger ligation with phosphine reagents, and Copper (I)-catalysed azide-alkyne cycloaddition (CuAAC) or Strain promoted azide-alkyne cycloaddition (SPAAC) in click reactions.

===== Preferred click reactions =====
CuAAC and SPAAC are both common click reactions which are often interchangeable in click chemistry. It is well known that intracellular Cu(I) is cytotoxic, which means CuAAC is not as common as SPAAC click reactions for research leading to in-vivo applications. The researchers for this study decided to use CuAAC, despite the purpose of this research to have in-vivo applications, for a few reasons. First, the likelihood for copper to be bound by the $4RepCT^{3Aha}$ protein is low due to the presence of only 2 glutamic acid residues and no histidine residues (two residues with a high affinity for Cu(I)). These residues are present in the thioredoxin; which is the solubilizing fusion partner conjugated to the 4RepCT protein during synthesis. However, this does not cause issues since the thioredoxin is removed in order to trigger the self-assembly reaction with thrombin which results in fiber formation. This removal of the Cu(I) laden thioredoxin removes virtually all copper from the silk structure. The researchers also, through a buffer containing EDTA and by utilizing THPTA (which stabilizes the copper ions), rinsed the fibers resulting in further removal of Cu(I) leaving a <0.1 % by weight trace of copper ions. Secondly, CuAAC outperforms SPAAC in click reactions where proteins with a high cytosine content, such as 4RepCT, are present. The SPAAC process, in the presence of proteins like 4RepCT, will often create 'clicks' in off-target sites resulting in the ligand conjugating to the wrong part of the protein and rendering the protein essentially useless. In order to maximize the number of functional sites along the fiber, CuAAC is preferred.

===== Leading results =====
This study demonstrated the CuAAC mediated conjugation of $4RepCT^{3Aha}$ with two different fluorophores and the antibiotic levofloxacin, showcasing the potential of covalently functionalized recombinant spider silk proteins as biomaterials with enhanced properties. The researchers were able to successfully conjugate $4RepCT^{3Aha}$ with alkyne fluorophores, proving the protein can be functionalized through an azide group while conjugated to the axis of the silk fiber. Their results showed not only an intense uniform fluorescence along the fiber axis but also an intense uniform composite fluorescence when the fiber was decorated with two different fluorophores in a 1:1 ratio.

To prove the functional azide group could be decorated with a clinically relevant molecule, the researchers attempted to decorate the fiber with glycidyl propargyl ether (an acid-labile linker) and bound Levofloxacin (a gram-positive targeting antibiotic) to it using an ester bond between the epoxide carboxylate groups respectively. They conducted an inhibition zone assay with the functionalized silk fibers against E. Coli NCTC 12242 bacteria where each factor level contained LB media. Their results showed a successful functionalization of the Levofloxacin decorated fiber which maintained an antibiotic persistence across a 3.5 cm radius for 120 hours and a cell density ~50% of other factor levels (LB media only, unfunctionalized silk, and Levofloxacin doped silk) with p ≤ 0.01. A maximum sustained release of Levofloxacin from the fiber of 5 days was achieved.

==== Dermal applications ====
===== Historical =====
Spider silk is one of the earliest known dermal patches. Primarily used for wound binding, the glycoprotein adhesive found on the capture spiral silk, as well as the protein structure of the fiber itself, has mild antibacterial properties. The silk, acting as a local antiseptic, reduced the rate of sepsis and chronic illness. The silk's viscoelastic properties and high tensile strength and toughness aided wound healing in a way similar to surgical tape.

===== Proposed =====
Despite its superiority to current methods of large-surface-area wound care—gauze wrapping, honey vinegar treatments, and systemic antibiotics—and popular dermal patch uses, spider silk has not found its way into clinical practice. Historically the main reason for this is the difficulty of farming, and harvesting the silk. Unlike silkworms, that spin silk for several easy-to-replicate conditions, spiders spin silk for specific purposes such as catching prey, difficult to replicate in laboratory conditions. In addition, spiders generally tend to be cannibalistic, so breeding sufficient numbers becomes difficult. Forced silking yields unsuitable silks. The most popular proposed use case for dermal applications are:

- Dermal patch for local drug delivery
- Local antibiotic wound dressings
- Local dermal reperfusion scaffolds
- Cutaneous mucosal adhesive for attaching non-adhesive local drug delivery devices

==== Silkworm silk ====
===== Research =====
Research shows silkworm silk does not possess any inherent antibiotic characteristics, bio-mimicking mechanical properties, and can cause fatal respiratory allergic reactions in some people.

A 2020 study found that recombinantly produced spider silk proteins self-assemble at the liquid-air interface of a standing solution, forming protein permeable, super strong and ultra flexible membranes. The unforced self-assembly creates a nanofibrilar membrane which supports cell growth. A confluent layer of human skin cells forms within three days, and would be suitable for direct delivery to a patient.

===== Dermal applications =====
As silkworm silk is potentially fatal to humans when in contact with vasculature, there is no approved dermal patch, or dermal patch-like, application for silkworm silk.
