= International Society for Pediatric and Adolescent Diabetes =

- Founded: 1974
- Purpose: diabetes mellitus in children
- Website: www.ispad.org

The International Society for Pediatric and Adolescent Diabetes is a professional organization located in Berlin, Germany, whose aims are to promote clinical basic science, research, education and advocacy in childhood and adolescent diabetes. ISPAD publishes the journal Pediatric Diabetes. The organization was established in 1974.

== About ISPAD ==
The International Society for Pediatric and Adolescent Diabetes (ISPAD) is a professional organization that brings together doctors, nurses, dieticians, psychologists, scientists and other professionals to improve the treatment of children and families afflicted by diabetes throughout the world. ISPAD seeks to improve the understanding of the etiology and epidemiology of diabetes. ISPAD educates physicians and other health care professionals to better understand and care for children and adolescents with diabetes. Furthermore, the Society has developed guidelines for appropriate diabetes care and assists in the implementation of new protocols for therapy.

== Activities ==
=== Annual conference ===
ISPAD holds a conference annually, typically in different countries, though it can be held again non-consecutively. The location of where the conference is held is decided by its executive board.

The 40th Annual Conference of the International Society for Pediatric and Adolescent Diabetes, ISPAD 2014, was held between 3-6 September 2014 in Toronto, Canada. The 50th Annual Conference was held in Lisbon, Portugal in 2024 at the Centro de Congressos de Lisboa.

Year	City	Country
1975	Tel Aviv	Israel
1976	Han-sur-Lesse	Belgium
1977	Chateau de la Verriere	France
1978	Netanya	Israel
1979	Berlin	Germany
1980	Palafrugell	Spain
1981	Les Collons sur Sion	Switzerland
1982	Nairobi	Kenya
1983	Miskolc-Tapolca	Hungary
1984	St George	USA
1985	El Escorial	Spain
1986	Verona	Italy
1987	Lyon	France
1988	Manly Beach	Australia
1989	Bled	Yugoslavia
1990	Oslo	Norway
1991	Williamsburg	USA
1992	St Andrew's	Scotland, UK
1993	Island of Kos	Greece
1994	Atami	Japan
1995	Linköping	Sweden
1996	Pittsburgh	USA
1997	Turku	Finland
1998	Zurich	Switzerland
1999	Noordwijkerhout	The Netherlands
2000	Los Angeles	USA
2001	Siena	Italy
2002	Graz	Austria
2003	St Malo	France
2004	Singapore	Singapore
2005	Cambridge	England, UK
2006	Kraków	Poland
2007	Berlin	Germany
2008	Durban	South Africa
2009	Ljubljana	Slovenia
2010	Buenos Aires	Argentina
2011	Miami Beach	USA
2012	Istanbul	Turkey
2013	Gothenburg	Sweden
2014	Toronto	Canada
2015	Brisbane	Australia
2016	Valencia	Spain
2017	Innsbruck	Austria

=== Travel grants ===
ISPAD also supports attendance at the annual conferences through the awarding of travel grants. Grants are awarded either to individuals based on the quality or to individuals from non-high-income countries as ‘Developing World Initiative Travel Grants’.

=== Post-graduate courses ===
ISPAD also supports post-graduate courses and workshops organized by members worldwide on the basis that these members organize the courses and raise most of the funding. Recent venues have included Jamaica, Romania, Jordan and Peru.

=== Science schools ===
The ISPAD Science and Research School for Physicians annual science school brings together 20 to 25 young researchers from across the world to take part in a learning program and engage in discussion with leading experts in the field. Courses have been held in Sydney, Cambridge (UK), and Kyoto.

ISPAD Science School for Healthcare Professionals is held each year just prior to the annual conference and is aimed at helping health professionals other than doctors to develop a scientific and evidence-based approach to their work with children and young people with diabetes.

=== Prizes ===
Through the years, the international society has its annual set of prizes.

- The ISPAD Prize for Achievement is the society's highest honour. It is awarded for outstanding contributions in the areas of science, education and advocacy.
- The ISPAD Lestradet Prize for Education and Advocacy will be given to honour any ISPAD Member who has made an outstanding contribution within education and advocacy.
- Any ISPAD member (aged 40 or less) can apply for the ISPAD Young Investigator Award. The application must include a paper published in a peer-reviewed journal within two years prior to the application, and a CV including all publications.
- The ISPAD Prize for Innovation in Pediatric Diabetes Care is for any professional, group or individual who has made a significant innovation in pediatric diabetes care. This prize puts the focus on diabetes in childhood by recognizing innovations to improve health and quality of care for children and young people. Only non-commercial innovations will be considered for this prize.

=== Fellowships ===
ISPAD awards two fellowships:

- The Visiting Research Fellowship for ISPAD members below age 40 is designed to cover expenses for a six-month (or longer) visit in an ISPAD members' centre and can be applied for by ISPAD members who wish to study or carry out diabetes-related research at a recognized centre of excellence.
- The Allan Drash Clinical Fellowship is a six-week clinical fellowship offered for ISPAD members below 45 years of age so that they can study an aspect of diabetes important to them. Applicants are required to demonstrate suitability and to have a letter of support from the institution they intend to visit. A report must be submitted to the ISPAD Steering Committee within one year after the fellowship.

=== Journal ===
ISPAD publishes Clinical Practice Consensus Guidelines for the management of diabetes in children and adolescents. These are published in Pediatric Diabetes, ISPAD's official journal.

== Other activities ==
=== ISPAD Consensus Guidelines ===
In 2009, the comprehensive "ISPAD Clinical Practice Consensus Guidelines" were published as a compendium in Pediatric Diabetes. These are evidence-based guidelines compiled under the editorship of Dr Peter Swift, former Secretary General of ISPAD with the co-authors Ragnar Hanas, Kim C. Donaghue and Georgeanna Klingensmith. The guidelines are used worldwide and referenced extensively.
