= Journal of Diabetes Science and Technology =

- Discipline: Endocrinology
- Language: English
- Edited by: David C. Klonoff

Publication details
- History: 2007-present
- Publisher: SAGE Publications
- Frequency: Bimonthly

Standard abbreviations
- ISO 4: J. Diabetes Sci. Technol.

Indexing
- ISSN: 1932-3107 (print); 1932-2968 (web)
- LCCN: 2006213387

Links
- Journal homepage; Online access; Online archive

The Journal of Diabetes Science and Technology (JDST) is a bimonthly peer-reviewed medical journal covering all aspects of diabetes. JDST covers all aspects of diabetes technology including glucose monitoring; insulin and metabolic peptide delivery; the artificial and bioartificial pancreas, telemedicine; software for modeling; physiologic monitoring; technology for managing obesity; diagnostic tests of glycation; and the use of bioengineered tools such as MEMS, new biomaterials, and nanotechnology to develop new sensors and actuators to be applied to diabetes. Articles in JDST cover both basic research and clinical applications of technologies being developed to help people with diabetes. It is published by SAGE Publishing on behalf of the Diabetes Technology Society. The journal was established in 2007 and the editor-in-chief is David C. Klonoff (Mills Peninsula Health Services).

== Abstracting and indexing ==
The journal is abstracted and indexed in Index Medicus/MEDLINE/PubMed and Scopus.

== Special sections ==
=== Volume 1 (2007) ===
Issue 1 - Journal of Diabetes Science and Technology and the Diabetes Technology Community

Issue 3 - Mathematical Models of the Metabolic System in Health and in Diabetes

Issue 4 - Optical Non-Invasive Glucose Monitoring

Issue 5 - Sensors & Algorithms for Continuous Glucose Monitoring

Issue 6 - Artificial Pancreas: Closed-Loop Control of Glucose Variability in Diabetes

=== Volume 2 (2008) ===
Issue 1 - Technology for Diabetes Care and Evaluation in the Veterans Health Administration

Issue 2 - Automated Inpatient Blood Sampling for Glucose Measurement

Issue 3 - Computerized Algorithms

Issue 4 - No-Coding Strategies for Glucose Monitors

Issue 5 - Biocompatibility of Implanted Diabetes Devices: Part 1

Issue 6 - Technology for Hospital Management of Diabetes

=== Volume 3 (2009) ===
Issue 2 - Non-Invasive Technologies for Glucose Monitoring

Issue 3 - Laboratory Advances in Hemoglobin A1c Measurement

Issue 4 - Clinical Advances in Hemoglobin A1c Measurement

Issue 5 - Artificial Pancreas Systems

Issue 6 - Challenges in Glycemic Control in Perioperative and Critically Ill Patients

=== Volume 4 (2010) ===
Issue 1 - Alarms for Continuous Glucose Monitors

Issue 2 - Blood Spot Testing Symposium

Issue 3 - Insulin Pens

Issue 4 - Foot Technology

Issue 5 - Interstitial Fluid Physiology as it Relates to Glucose Monitoring Technologies

Issue 6 - Glucagon: Physiology and Pharmacotherapy

=== Volume 5 (2011) ===
Issue 1 - Mobile Technology

Issue 2 - Virtual Reality Technologies for Research and Education in Obesity and Diabetes - Sponsored by the National Institutes of Health

Issue 3 - Interstitial Fluid Physiology as It Relates to Glucose Monitoring Technologies

Issue 4 - Diabetes and the Environment

Issue 5 - Glucose Electrochemistry

Issue 6 - Artificial Pancreas

=== Volume 6 (2012) ===
Issue 1 - Management of Hyperglycemia in the Pediatric ICU

Issue 2 - Human Factors for Diabetes Devices

Issue 3 - Diabetes Mellitus in Veterinary Medicine

Issue 4 - Ultra-Fast Insulins

Issue 5 - Diabetes Technologies and Hospital Care

Issue 6 - Fluorescence Glucose Sensing, Part I

=== Volume 7 (2013) ===
Issue 2 - Legal Issues in Diabetes Technologies

Issue 3 - Mobile Health and Diabetes

=== Volume 8 (2014) ===
Issue 1 - Biosimilar Insulin

Issue 2 - Telemedicine for Diabetes

Issue 3 - Novel Methods for Delivering Insulin

Issue 4 - Hospital Diabetes Software Part 1

Issue 5 - Hospital Diabetes Software, Part 2

Issue 6 - Hospital Diabetes Hardware

=== Volume 9 (2015) ===
Issue 1 - Glucagon Therapy

Issue 2 - Glycated Proteins

Issue 3 - Image-Based Dietary Assessment

Issue 4 - Intravenous Glucose Monitoring

Issue 5 - Implanted Glucose Sensors

Issue 6 - AP Using Non-Glucose Data in the Control Algorithm
