= Ellen Jorgensen =

Molecular biologist, entrepreneur and community science advocate

Ellen D. Jorgensen (born 2 June 1955) is a New York-based molecular biologist and serial entrepreneur. In addition to her long career in the biotechnology industry she is also credited with playing a leading role in promoting the do-it-yourself biology movement where she has worked to increase scientific literacy in the general population, particularly in the fields of molecular and synthetic biology. She is a co-founder of both non-profit (Biotech Without Borders and Genspace. ) and for-profit (Aanika Biosciences) biotechnology-based companies. In 2017, Ellen Jorgensen was named one of the Most Creative Leaders in Business by Fast Company. Her current focus is on combating climate change through her role as Vice President of Biotechnology at CarbonBridge, a biotech startup that uses bacteria to remove environmental methane and create liquid fuel.

== Education and career ==
Ellen Jorgensen graduated from New York University (NYU) in 1977 with a B.A. in Biology. She then went on to earn both her MA and MPhil in Biological Sciences from Columbia University in 1979 and 1981, respectively. Jorgensen returned to NYU where she obtained her Ph.D. in Cell and Molecular Biology in 1987 from the Sackler Institute. She later went to SUNY Downstate as a post-doc to continue research in protein structure and function. Jorgensen has served as adjunct faculty at The Cooper Union in New York City, New York Medical College and at the School of Visual Arts.

Jorgensen devoted many years of her career to various positions at both nonprofit and for-profit companies within the biotechnology sector. She spent eight years, from 2001 to 2009, as the Director of Biomarker Discovery and Development at Vector Research, researching early biomarkers of tobacco-related lung disease. In 2009, she co-founded the community biohacker space, Genspace where she developed innovative programming such as the Biorocket internships for underserved New York City high school students and classes in genetic engineering for the general public. Under her leadership Genspace provided low-cost lab space for biotech entrepreneurs. Opentrons and Curieco both used the Genspace pre-incubator space to launch successful companies. In 2017, Jorgensen founded Biotech Without Borders, a second nonprofit community biotechnology lab where she continues to serve on the board of directors.

In 2009, Ellen Jorgensen co-founded Genspace, the first nonprofit community biotech lab. In 2010, Jorgensen initiated Genspace's curriculum of informal science education, leading to the company being named one the World's Top 10 Innovative Companies in Education. The goal of Genspace is to increase scientific literacy in the general public by providing classes and workshops, as well as a space for community members to get involved in a biotechnology laboratory. In March 2017, Ellen Jorgensen stepped down from her role as executive director to found Biotech Without Borders and was replaced by Genspace co-founder, Daniel Grushkin. Jorgensen became president emeritus.

While Genspace was created with the goal of making scientific literacy more accessible, the organization was met with criticism by those that felt that hands-on science should be left to the professionals. Despite this criticism, Genspace has continued on, along with a larger community of hacker spaces opening worldwide, fostering an open environment of scientific collaboration and learning between amateurs and professionals.

Genspace is located in Brooklyn, New York. The lab follows Biosafety Level 1 restrictions. Different membership tiers are offered providing access to events, classes, lab access, participation to community projects, and more. In the spring of 2018, community projects will be offered in the fields of mycoremediation, open plant collaboration, and optogenetics.

=== Accolades ===
- World's Top 10 Innovative Companies in Education (Fast Company, 2014)
- Maker Space of the Year (Brooklyn Innovation Awards, 2016 & 2017)

== Biotech Without Borders ==
In 2017, Ellen Jorgensen stepped down from her leadership role at Genspace in order to found Biotech Without Borders, where she now acts as President. Biotech Without Borders is a Brooklyn, New York based nonprofit public charity dedicated to enabling communities underrepresented in the biotechnology field to gain hands-on biotech lab experience. Biotech Without Borders focuses on providing a Biosafety Level 2 lab space, distributing biotech resources to labs worldwide, and engaging the public through hands-on lab classes, workshops, and events. It is the first Biosafety Level 2 lab open for public projects. Compared to Genspace, Biotech Without Borders seeks to facilitate engagement with more authentic high-level science.

== Selected publications ==
- Albino, Anthony; Huang, Xuan; Jorgensen, Ellen; Gietl, Diana; Traganos, Frank; Darzynkiewicz, Zbigniew (2006-07-01). "Induction of DNA double-strand breaks in A549 and normal human pulmonary epithelial cells by cigarette smoke is mediated by free radicals". International Journal of Oncology. 28: 1491–505. doi:10.3892/ijo.28.6.1491.
- Albino, Anthony; Huang, X; Jorgensen, Ellen; Yang, J; Gietl, D; Traganos, F; Darzynkiewicz, Zbigniew (2004-09-01). "Induction of H2AX Phosphorylation in Pulmonary Cells by Tobacco Smoke: A New Assay for Carcinogens". Cell Cycle. 3: 1062–8. doi:10.4161/cc.3.8.988.
- Albino, Anthony; Jorgensen, Ellen; Rainey, Patrick; Gillman, Ivan; Jeffrey Clark, T; Gietl, Diana; Zhao, Hong; Traganos, Frank; Darzynkiewicz, Zbigniew (2009-08-01). "gammaH2AX: A potential DNA damage response biomarker for assessing toxicological risk of tobacco products". Mutation research. 678: 43–52. doi:10.1016/j.mrgentox.2009.06.009.
- F. Klement, John; B Moorefield, M; Jorgensen, Ellen; E. Brown, Jeanne; Risman, Steven; T. McAllister, William (1990-10-01). "Discrimination between bacteriophage T3 and T7 promoters by the T3 and T7 RNA polymerases depends primarily upon a three base-pair region located 10 to 12 base-pairs upstream from the start site". Journal of molecular biology. 215: 21–9. doi:10.1016/S0022-2836(05)80091-9.
- Jorgensen, Ellen; Bhagwat, Dileep (1998-06-01). "Development of dissolution tests for oral extended-release products". Pharmaceutical Science & Technology Today. 1: 128–135. doi:10.1016/S1461-5347(98)00029-7.
- Jorgensen, Ellen (1985-09-01). "Partial nucleotide sequence op newcastle disease virus HN gene". Virus Research - VIRUS RES. 3. doi:10.1016/0168-1702(85)90360-0.
- Jorgensen, Ellen; Dozmorov, Igor; B Frank, Mark; Centola, Michael; Albino, Anthony (2004-10-01). "Global Gene Expression Analysis of Human Bronchial Epithelial Cells Treated with Tobacco Condensates". Cell Cycle. 3: 1154–68. doi:10.4161/cc.3.9.1078.
- Jorgensen, Ellen; Grushkin, Daniel (2011-04-01). "Engage with, don't fear, community labs". Nature medicine. 17: 411. doi:10.1038/nm0411-411.
- Jorgensen, Ellen; L. Collins, Peter; T. Lomedico, Peter (1987-02-01). "Cloning and nucleotide sequence of newcastle disease virus hemagglutinin-neuraminidase mRNA: Identification of a putative sialic acid binding site". Virology. 156: 12–24. doi:10.1016/0042-6822(87)90431-4.
- Jorgensen, Ellen; Stinson, Andy; Shan, Lin; Yang, Jin; Gietl, Diana; Albino, Anthony (2008-02-01). "Cigarette smoke induces endoplasmic reticulum stress and the unfolded protein response in normal and malignant human lung cells". BMC cancer. 8: 229. doi:10.1186/1471-2407-8-229.
- Jorgensen, Ellen; Zhao, Hong; Traganos, Frank; Albino, Anthony; Darzynkiewicz, Zbigniew (2010-06-01). "DNA damage response induced by exposure of human lung adenocarcinoma cells to smoke from tobacco- and nicotine-free cigarettes". Cell Cycle. 9: 2170–6. doi:10.4161/cc.9.11.11842.
- Schäffner, Anton; Jorgensen, Ellen; T. McAllister, William; R. Hartmann, Guido (1987-12-01). "Specific labelling of the active site of T7 RNA polymerase". Nucleic Acids Research. 15: 8773–81. doi:10.1093/nar/15.21.8773.
- Tanaka, Toshiki; Huang, Xuan; Jorgensen, Ellen; Gietl, Diana; Traganos, Frank; Darzynkiewicz, Zbigniew; Albino, Anthony (2007-02-01). "ATM activation accompanies histone H2AX phosphorylation in A549 cells upon exposure to tobacco smoke". BMC cell biology. 8: 26. doi:10.1186/1471-2121-8-26.
- Zhao, Hong; Albino, Anthony; Jorgensen, Ellen; Traganos, Frank; Darzynkiewicz, Zbigniew (2009-10-01). "DNA Damage Response Induced by Tobacco Smoke in Normal Human Bronchial Epithelial and A549 Pulmonary Adenocarcinoma Cells Assessed by Laser Scanning Cytometry". Cytometry. Part A : the journal of the International Society for Analytical Cytology. 75: 840–7. doi:10.1002/cyto.a.20778.
- Zhao, Hong; Yang, Jin; Shan, Lin; Jorgensen, Ellen (2011-12-31). "Measuring the Impact of Cigarette Smoke on the UPR". Methods in enzymology. 489: 147–64. doi:10.1016/B978-0-12-385116-1.00009-1.
