= SoundBio Lab =

Community laboratory in Seattle, Washington, United States

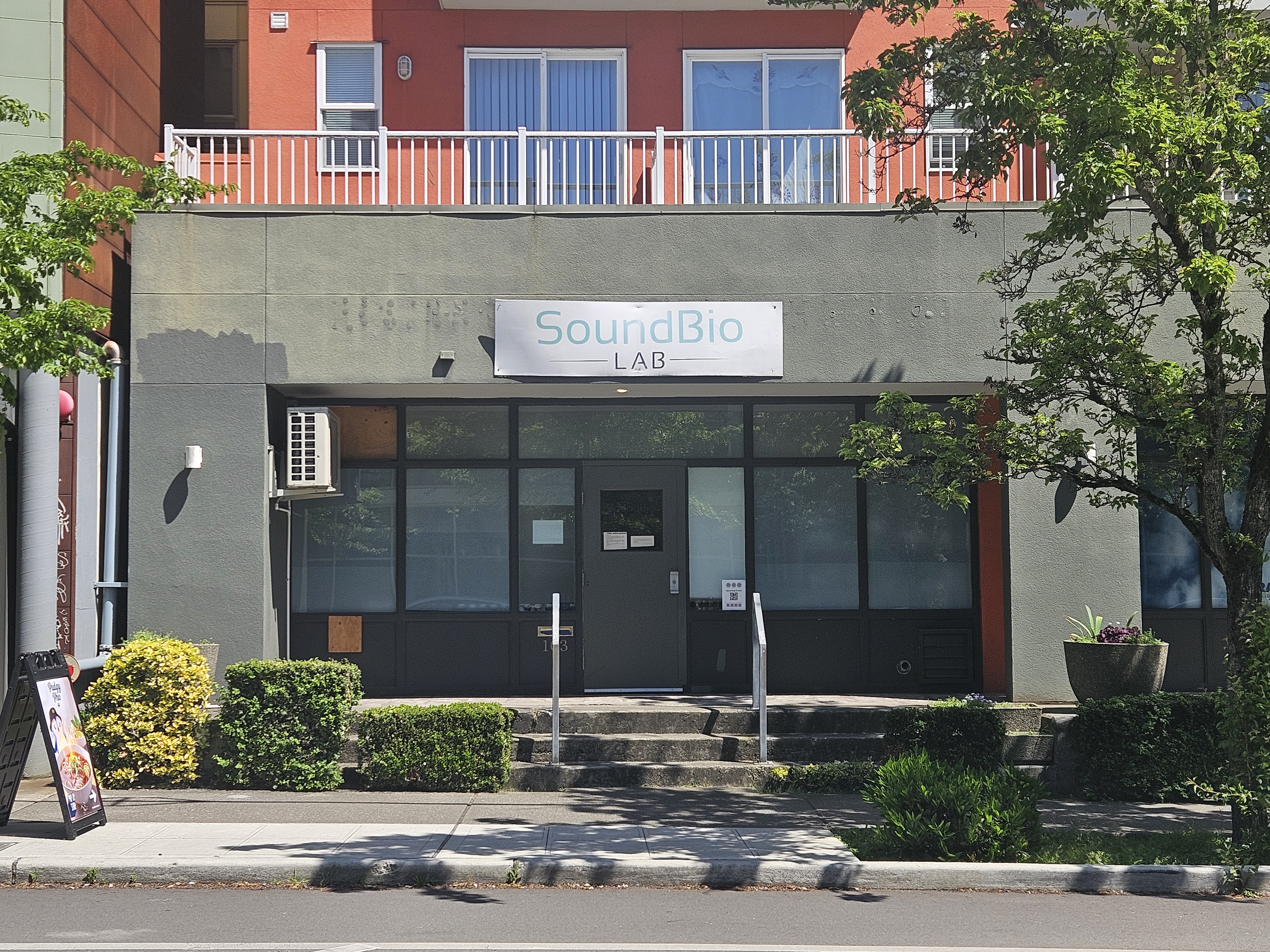
- Lab entrance
- Founded: June 27th, 2016
- Established: March 11th, 2017
- Location: Seattle, Washington
- Website: https://www.sound.bio/

SoundBio Lab (also known as SoundBio) is a non-profit community laboratory and BSL-1 biomakerspace located in Seattle, Washington. Founded in 2016, the organization provides laboratory space for independent research projects, offers hands-on classes on biological techniques, and hosts community biology and STEM education programs. SoundBio is part of the DIY Biology movement, which promotes public access to biotechnology education and research infrastructure.

== Facilities ==
SoundBio, a 501(c)(3) organization, operates as a BSL-1 community laboratory equipped for molecular biology and microbiology work with: PCR machines, centrifuges, autoclaves, incubators, an Opentrons liquid-handling system, light microscopes, orbital shakers, incubators, refrigerators, gel electrophoresis equipment, etc. Much of the equipment was acquired through donations, grants, or second-hand purchases; however, they are professional-grade.

=== Education ===
SoundBio regularly offers hands-on classes on biological techniques on topics such as: bacterial transformation, microscopy, synthetic biology, gel electrophoresis, and plasmid minipreps. These programs are designed to accommodate participants across a range of experience levels, from middle school students to professionals.

For middle school students, SoundBio hosts the after-school program Life Science Explorers, in which participants learn molecular biology techniques through the collection and sequencing of moss samples gathered from their local environment. In partnership with the STEMTAC Foundation, SoundBio hosts the National Youth Laboratory Internship, an eight-week hybrid summer program for students ages 16-20 that provides practical research experience in microbiology, biochemistry, electronics, etc.

The makerspace provides laboratory space, equipment access, biosafety oversight, and mentorship for high school students conducting independent research projects and science fair entries. Students from schools including The Overlake School, Roosevelt High School, Tesla STEM High School, and Mountlake Terrace High School have used SoundBio facilities for projects involving: plant genetics, bacterial quorum sensing, algal growth, antibiotic resistance, plant pigment production, etc. Several projects were conducted for competitions including the Central Sound Regional Science and Engineering Fair and the Washington State Science & Engineering Fair.

== History ==
SoundBio Lab was founded on March 11, 2016 by Michal Galdzicki, Zach Mueller, and Regina Wu. The idea for the makerspace originated in 2014, inspired by a podcast about the iGem competition. The co-founders met at the now-defunct HiveBio Community Laboratory.

=== Previous community projects ===
==== Citizen Salmon ====
Citizen Salmon was a community science project led by Galdzicki, originating from HiveBio Community Laboratory, that used DNA testing and genotyping to identify the species and origin of store-bought salmon. The project explored methods for tracing salmon to their river of origin, with applications in seafood sourcing transparency and stability; it was presented at Biohack the Planet in 2016.

Kombucha Science

Kombucha Science was a collaborative community research project led by SoundBio Lab in partnership with Counter Culture Labs and Boslab. The project studied the microbial composition of kombucha using culturing, DNA barcoding, genome sequencing, and other microbiology techniques; It included community workshops where participants analyzed samples and discussed fermentation processes.

==== OpenCovid19 ====
On March 1, 2020, SoundBio co-founder Zach Mueller and Thomas Landrain of Just One Giant Lab launched the OpenCovid19 Initiative to develop and share open-source methods for detecting COVID-19. The initiative grew rapidly to tens of thousands of participants across more than 180 countries, producing over 90 projects, while SoundBio contributed within BSL-1 constraints using non-clinical materials.

==== Bionic Leaf ====
The Bionic Leaf project, led by Mark Minie, received $100,000 through the Amazon Catalyst program to develop open-source educational kits based on earlier Bionic Leaf research. It involved SoundBio co-founders, Michal Galdzicki and Zach Mueller, as well as University of Washington Professor Herbert Sauro, and SoundBio members.

==== SoundBio Ignite Prize ====
As part of the 2026 Hollomon Health Innovation Challenge, SoundBio awarded the Ignite Prize to team TPT-Finder for creating a handheld device that helps surgeons distinguish parathyroid tissue during thyroid surgery to prevent life-threatening complications. The prize was a free 6-month membership at SoundBio.

=== iGem ===
SoundBio previously hosted high school teams that participated in the annual iGEM competition. From 2017 to 2019, SoundBio iGEM teams developed projects in environmental and biomedical synthetic biology, including engineering Escherichia coli to express PCB-degrading enzymes for pollutant breakdown, creating a synthetic biology-based alternative to the Limulus Amebocyte Lysate(LAL) endotoxin assay using Bacillus subtilis, and developing "Bacto-Basics" which explored engineered bacterial cellulose and optogenetic control of protein attachment for wound healing applications.

=== Outreach ===
In 2017, SoundBio held a booth at MiniMaker Faire Seattle.

From 2018 to 2020, SoundBio participated in a variety of STEM outreach events and workshops in the Greater Seattle Area and beyond, including collaborations with organizations and venues such as the Museum of Pop Culture(MoPOP), the Museum of History and Industry(MOHAI), Amazon's Women in Engineering Tech Expo, Juno Therapeutics & Celgene, the Pacific Science Center, and the Sammamish Library. These activities typically featured introductory biotechnology demonstrations and hands-on laboratory exercises such as pipetting and DNA extraction.

In 2019, SoundBio also engaged in broader educational and scientific outreach initiatives, including participation in the Interagency Modeling and Analysis group conference in Washington, D.C., the global community Bio Summit hosted by the MIT Media Lab, and university and youth-focused programs such as the University of Washington "Up Your Ave" orientation event and workshops for cub scouts.

In 2025, SoundBio conducted additional workshops in collaboration with UW Riverways at South Shore K-8 and with Seattle Science Lab, including introductory molecular biology activities such as DNA extraction.

== See also ==
- List of Biomakerspaces in the United States
- Hackerspace
