= List of Biomakerspaces in the United States =

Communal biological laboratory spaces

This is a list of Biomakerspaces in the United States organized by time zone. The term biomakerspace refers to a communal laboratory space specifically equipped for undertaking Biology.

== Active ==
=== Pacific ===
- Berkeley BioLabs
- Biocurious
- Biopunk Lab
- Bio, Tech, and Beyond
- Counter Culture Labs
- La Jolla Library Bio Lab
- SoundBio Lab

=== Mountain ===
- Biodidact
- HeatSync Labs
- Utah Bio Collective

=== Central ===
- ChiTownBio

=== Eastern ===
- Baltimore Under Ground Science (BUGSS)
- Boston Open Science Lab (BosLab)
- FamiLAB
- Genspace
- MIT BioMakers
- Ronin Genetics
- Triangle DIY Biology

== Inactive ==
=== Pacific ===
- HiveBio Community lab
- PortLab
- Wet Lab
- Indie Bio
- TheLab

=== Mountain ===
- Denver Biolabs

=== Central ===
- Tri Sci
- DIYbio Madison
- MN DIYbio
- Bioblaze
- Prophase Biostudios

=== Eastern ===
- Asheville DIY Bio Meetup
- Capital Area BioSpace (CABS)
- Open Bio Labs
- DIYbio South Carolina
- Cap City Biohackers
- Great Lakes Biotech Academy
- Biologik Labs
- Biotech Without Borders
- Kentucky Star Center

== See also ==
- Do-it-yourself biology
