= Open Insulin Project =

Project to develop an open source protocol for producing insulin

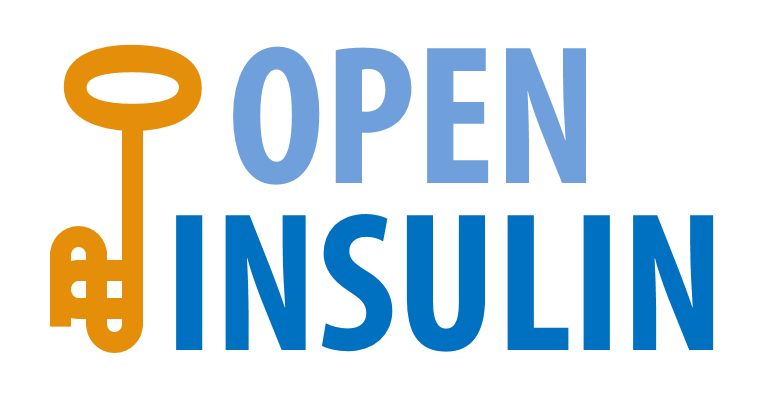
- Formation: 2015
- Founder: Anthony Di Franco
- Headquarters: Counter Culture Labs
- Location: Bay Area, California, USA
- Website: openinsulin.org

The Open Insulin Project is a community of researchers and advocates working to develop an open-source protocol for producing insulin that is affordable, has transparent pricing, and is community-owned.

== History ==
The Open Insulin Project was started in 2015 by Anthony Di Franco, himself a type 1 diabetic. He started the project in response to the unreasonably high prices of insulin in the US. The project has been housed in Counter Culture Labs, a community laboratory and makerspace in the Bay Area. Other collaborators include ReaGent, BioCurious and BioFoundry.

== Goals ==
The project aims to develop both the methodology and hardware to allow communities and individuals to produce medical-grade insulin for the treatment of diabetes. These methods will be low-cost in order to combat the high price of insulin in places like the US. There is also potential for small-scale distributed production that may allow for improved insulin access in places with poor availability infrastructure. Access to insulin remains so insufficient around the globe that "half of all people who need insulin lack the financial or logistical means to obtain adequate supplies".

== Motivation ==
Researcher Frederick Banting famously refused to put his name on the patent after discovering insulin in 1923. The original patent for insulin was later sold by his collaborators for just $1 to the University of Toronto in an effort to make it as available as possible. Despite this, for various reasons, there remains no generic version of insulin available in the US. Insulin remains controlled by a small number of large pharmaceutical companies and sold at prices unaffordable to many who rely on it to live, particularly those without insurance. This lack of availability has led to fatalities, such as Alec Smith, who died in 2017 due to lack of insulin. The Open Insulin Project is motivated by the urgent need to protect the health of those with diabetes regardless of their economic or employment status by developing low-cost methods for insulin production available for anyone to use.

== Progress and status ==
The project has genetically engineered microorganisms to produce long-acting (glargine) and short-acting (lispro) insulin analogs using standard techniques in biotechnology and according to their December 2018 release the "first major milestone ― the production of insulin at lab scale ― is almost complete".

The cost to produce insulin via Open Insulin methods is estimated by the project to be such that "roughly $10,000 should be enough to get a group started with the equipment needed to produce enough insulin for 10,000 people".

A more recent estimate (May 2020) by the Open Insulin Foundation states that it will cost $200,000 (one-time price, per patient of $7-$20) for used equipment and up to $1,000,000 (one-time price, per patient of $73) for new equipment. The average price per vial was estimated to be $7 with each patient needing two vials per month.

== See also ==
- OpenAPS, a project to create open source artificial pancreas system technology
- Nightscout
