= HiveBio Community Laboratory =

- Formation: 18 October 2013
- Founder: Katriona Guthrie-Honea, Bergen McMurray
- Headquarters: Seattle
- Location: 4000 NE 41st St, Seattle

HiveBio Community Laboratory was a biomakerspace in Seattle, Washington. Founded in 2013, it provided laboratory space, equipment, educational programs, and training for citizen scientists, students, and biotechnology enthusiasts. The organization operated as a membership-based laboratory and hosted classes, workshops, and community research projects.

== History ==
The laboratory was initially planned for Hackerbot Labs’ warehouse in Seattle’s SoDo district but was ultimately established at the Talaris Conference Center, near the University of Washington, due to higher-than-expected demand. It was funded through a Microryza crowdfunding campaign and donations from the Washington Biotechnology and Biomedical Association. Originally scheduled to open in June, it instead opened in October. The laboratory was co-founded by Katriona Guthrie-Honea and Bergen McMurray.

== Activities ==
HiveBio operated as a membership-based community laboratory. Members could access laboratory facilities, classes, and events through monthly memberships, while non-members could participate through one-time drop-in access. Membership and participation fees supported the laboratory’s operations.

Classes were scheduled up to six months in advance and covered topics such as basic biology, intellectual property, brain dissection, and discussion of the Association for Molecular Pathology v. Myriad Genetics, Inc. decision. The makerspace also hosted recurring activities, including a science-focused reading group and an edX Science and Cooking group, in which biological concepts were taught through cooking demonstrations developed by a Harvard University instructor. HiveBio additionally offered low-cost courses such as “Build Your Own Dinosaur,” a primer on bioinformatics that attracted nearly two dozen participants ranging from elementary school students to working scientists. Projects included aquaponics, DRD4 repeat studies, and ministat development.

HiveBio supported member-led research and independent projects, including the Citizen Salmon project, which aimed to use DNA sequencing to determine the river of origin of commercially purchased salmon. Participants could propose projects through the HiveBio website, with submissions reviewed by the organization’s Safety, Science, Ethics, and Education (SSEE) Committee. The committee was co-chaired by Michal Galdzicki, who also served as the makerspace’s chief science officer and later co-founded SoundBio Lab; SoundBio Lab subsequently carried forward work on the Citizen Salmon project.

== Facilities ==
The laboratory was classified as a Biosafety Level 1 (BSL-1) facility. No hazardous chemicals or pathogenic microorganisms were permitted at HiveBio, and projects were required to be approved by a safety and ethics board composed of representatives from the Institute for Systems Biology, a University of Washington bioengineering professor, and local biotechnology entrepreneurs.

Most of its equipment was acquired through donations or purchased second-hand from universities and research laboratories, as well as online marketplaces such as eBay. The 800-square-foot space contained shelves lined with pipettes, glass flasks, and other laboratory equipment, much of it salvaged from local biotechnology companies that had gone out of business. Core instrumentation included a refrigerator, freezer, microscope, and an older polymerase chain reaction (PCR) machine. Equipment not available in the laboratory was supplemented with low-cost substitutes, such as a pressure cooker used in place of an autoclave for sterilization, and additional items such as a centrifuge and DNA sequencer were listed as desired future acquisitions.

== See also ==
- List of Biomakerspaces in the United States
- Hackerspace
- DIY Biology
