= Baltimore Underground Science Space =

Citizen science project

- Formation: Summer 2012
- Founder: Dr. Tom Burkett
- Headquarters: Baltimore
- Website: https://bugssonline.org/

The Baltimore Underground Science Space (BUGSS) is a non-profit synthetic biology and biotechnology makerspace laboratory for science enthusiasts, hobbyists, and professionals to practice, share and learn about the biological sciences. BUGSS is closely aligned with do-it-yourself biology and the Maryland science community generally, and offers courses and lectures in addition to community lab space.

== History ==
BUGSS was cofounded in 2012 by Dr. Tom Burkett and Steve Stowell in response to growing public interest in science and biotechnology. It is located in the Highlandtown neighborhood of Baltimore, Maryland, in a building that also houses the Emerging Technology Center.

In 2015, BUGSS received $189,000 in funding from the Robert W. Deutsch Foundation to support hiring its first full-time laboratory and program manager. The grant expanded operating hours and enabled additional programming, including evening, weekend, and daytime sessions. The organization was also featured as part of the Maryland STEM Festival.

In 2017, BUGSS had approximately 20–25 members in 2017 and marked its fifth anniversary with an open house event during Baltimore Innovation Week, where visitors were invited to observe experiments.

In 2021, the Open Insulin Foundation and BUGSS received a $137,000 grant from Abell Foundation. BUGSS focused on reconnecting Baltimore residents with science by teaching students about bacterial insulin production in a supervised setting.

== Facilities ==
BUGSS operates a 2,700-square-foot facility with wet and dry laboratory space where members conduct independent biotechnology projects, participate in collaborative research, learn laboratory techniques, and share the cost of equipment and supplies. The volunteer-run laboratory in south Baltimore also maintains three home-built bioprinters operated by its members, including a modified 3D printer that uses hot water, agar, and plant cells to print engineered cellular structures.

=== Education ===
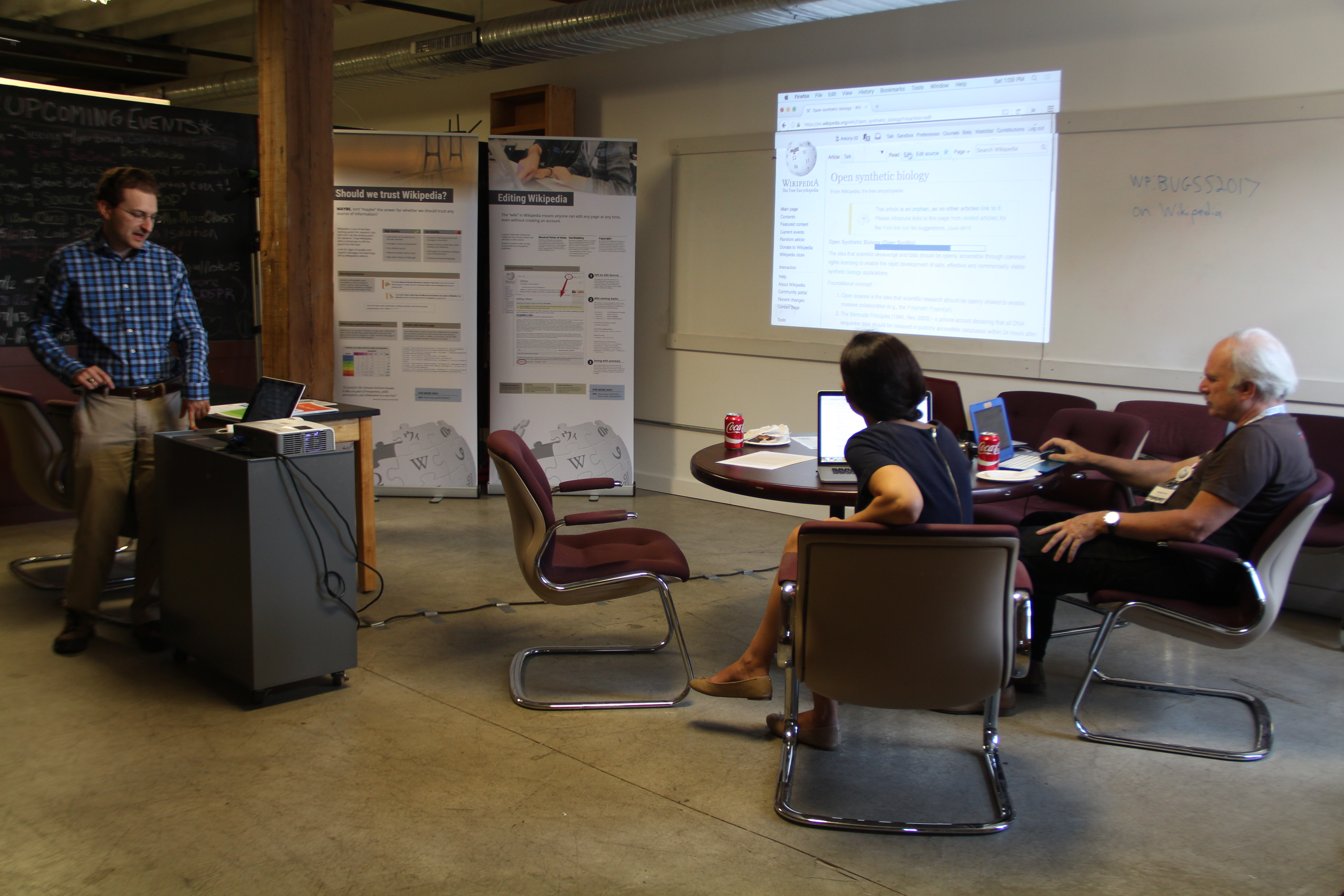
Event held within BUGSS

BUGSS offers classes, seminars, and programs for school-age students. In 2015, they had a course called "Build-A-Bug" where participants modified the behavior of a cell through DNA modification. In 2017, its programming included a class focused on the genome editing tool CRISPR, and the organization also participates in public outreach events such as Artscape in Baltimore, where it has presented “agar art” activities using microorganisms to engage visitors with biotechnology and synthetic biology concepts. BUGSS has also engaged in educational partnerships involving student training in laboratory techniques and biotechnology projects, including bacterial insulin production in supervised settings.

==== iGEM ====
BUGSS has regularly hosted teams for the annual International Genetically Engineered Machine (iGEM) competition.

In 2014, the team initially explored project directions including 3D bioprinting, engineered yeast for desalination, and biosafety “kill switch” systems, before focusing on cost-reducing and safety-focused synthetic biology projects. These included building on earlier work developing BioBricks for DNA polymerase synthesis, including Pfu DNA polymerase, to reduce the cost of PCR enzymes, as well as cultivating an engineered Escherichia coli strain designed to produce metallothionein and RFP in response to heavy metals such as lead.

In 2016, the team worked on isolating genes in the bacterium Ideonella sakaiensis that enable it to degrade polyethylene terephthalate (PET), following a 2014 discovery by Japanese researchers of PET-degrading bacteria, and introduced these genes into Escherichia coli with the broader aim of adapting the system for plastic degradation applications.

In 2025, the team developed a biosensor-based approach for detecting biomarkers associated with triple-negative breast cancer recurrence using engineered toehold switches responsive to microRNAs miRNA21 and miRNA155.

== See also ==
- List of Biomakerspaces in the United States
- Hackerspace
- DIY Biology
