= HeatSync Labs =

Hackerspace in Mesa, Arizona

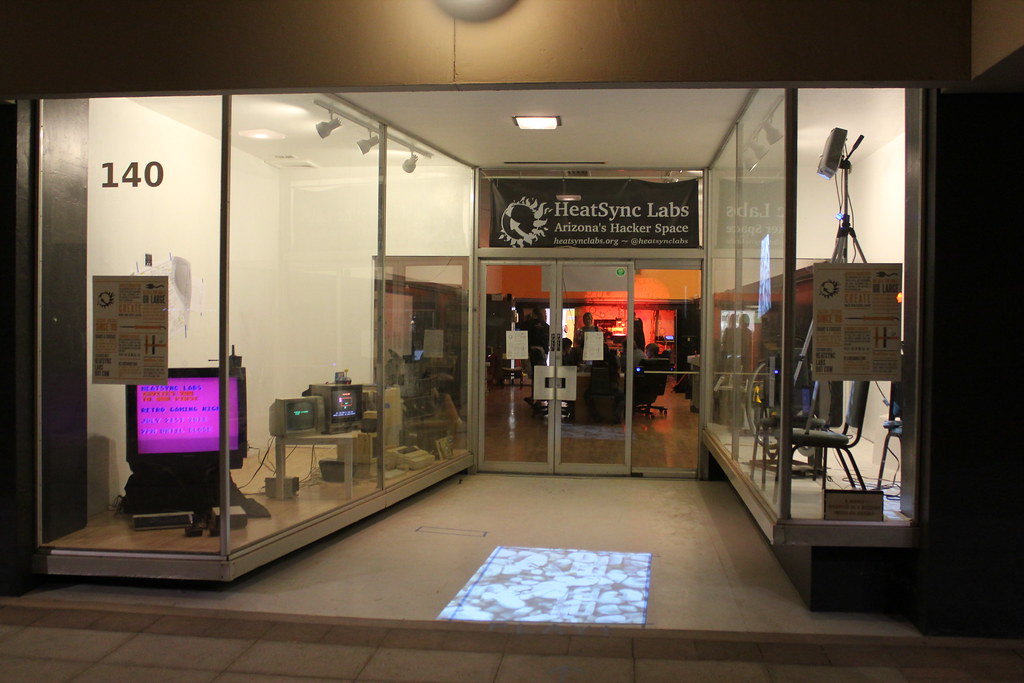
- Formation: 2009
- Headquarters: Mesa, Arizona
- Website: https://www.heatsynclabs.org/

HeatSync Labs is a hackerspace located in Mesa, Arizona that started in 2009. As Arizona's first hackerspace, it operates a 3,200 sq foot community workshop that provides a wide range of tools, equipment, and classes focused on electronics, fabrication, and other maker-related skills.

== History ==
Founded in 2009, Jacob Rosenthal and Jeremy Leung co-founded HeatSync Labs. Before moving to its current location, the hackerspace operated out of a software incubator space. Funding for the current location was raised through a community crowdfunding campaign.

On August 24, 2016, Ryan McDermott from HeatSync Labs was invited to the White House to meet with the Office of Science and Technology Policy along with 179 other representatives from other hackerspaces.

=== Startups & companies ===
The following are companies or consultancies that were either created or incubated at HeatSync Labs:

Iced Dev, Meshblu/Octoblu, LumenCanvas, Magnolia Development, and Mindblender Productions.

=== Organizations & communities ===
The following are organizations or community initiatives that either involve, were started by, or are led by HeatSync Lab members: AIot DevFest, Southwest Maker Fest, Bike Mesa, GDG Phoenix, AZ Haunters, and Women Who Code Phoenix.

== Facilities ==
The organization operates a 3,200 sq foot facility consisting of a large common meeting area, electronics workbenches, and separate workshop spaces for fabrication and machining projects. Equipment available to members includes: 3D printers, laser cutters, soldering stations, saws, welders, sewing machines, and other machine tools. In addition to providing access to equipment, the hackerspace offers classes and workshops that teach members how to use the tools and develop practical skills.

Due-paying members have 24/7 access to the facility while non-paying members have access 7 pm to 10 pm every weekday. Additionally, due-paying members have access to storage space.

== See also ==
- Hackerspace
- List of Biomakerspaces in the United States
