= DIYbio (organization) =

Organization

- Website type: Online network
- Website: www.diybio.org
- Launched: 2008; 18 years ago
- Current status: Active

DIYbio is an informal umbrella organization for individuals and local groups active in do-it-yourself biology, encompassing both a website and an email list. It serves as a network of individuals from around the globe that aims to help make biology a worthwhile pursuit for citizen scientists, biohackers, amateur biologists, and do-it-yourself biological engineers who value openness and safety. It was founded by Jason Bobe and Mackenzie Cowell in 2008.

The website provides resources for those in the do-it-yourself biology community. It maintains a directory of local groups encompassing both meetup groups and organizations maintaining community laboratory space, and a weekly blog listing events hosted by these organizations. The website also hosts safety information including ethics codes developed by the community and an "ask a biosafety professional" feature, as well as DIY instructions for making several types of laboratory equipment.

== Community ==
The blending of biology expertise gained from experimentation, and software development, quality control, awareness of open source principles, and security expertise transferred from the professional work of many DIYbio enthusiasts, has led to a unique subculture among this community, with some members referring to themselves as biopunks in reference to the cypherpunks of the turn of the century. The work 'A Biopunk Manifesto' delivered by Patterson at the UCLA conference lays down the principles of the biopunk movement, in an homage to the prior work of cypherpunk Eric Hughes.

That a significant proportion of the DIYbio mailing list membership are openly in support of outsourcing DNA synthesis and sequencing makes it difficult to determine whether this definition truly applies; in general, the two hobbies are impossible to distinguish and share a common community. Both are forms of citizen science. As DIYbio has grown, tools and materials have become available including instructions on how to build lab equipment and DIYbio stores like The ODIN that provide inexpensive materials.

Some participants call themselves ‘biohackers’, not hackers in the sense of infiltrating protected places and stealing information, but hackers in the original sense of taking things apart and putting them back together in a new, better way. These biohackers often pursue these interests outside of their jobs, companies or institutional labs.

== Activities ==
Beginning in 2009 the FBI engaged active members of the DIYbio Google Groups mailing list much like they engage scientific boards at universities and businesses. The dialogue focused on safety issues and aimed to instill a sense of self-policing in the ad-hoc online community. Because DIYbio and biohacking takes place on an international level, the FBI is limited in its ability to monitor and investigate all activity. However, in 2012 the FBI held a DIYbio conference in Walnut Creek, California where they paid to fly in biohackers from all over the world in an attempt to forge a connection to the DIYbio community.

DIYbio was featured at a table in Newcastle Maker Faire in March, 2010, with DNA extraction experiments and projects involving isolation of luminescent bacteria being demonstrated or given away. The "Dremelfuge", an open-source, 3D printed Dremel-powered centrifuge, was presented as an example of how Biotech can be made more accessible. A presentation on the potential of DIYbio and synthetic biology gathered a sizeable attendance.

Internal discussions and proposed projects for DIYbio members often include discussion of risk mitigation and public perception. An oft-discussed topic is the search for a convenient and safe "model organism" for DIYbio which would evoke less suspicion than E.coli. Suggestions include Janthinobacterium lividum, Bacillus subtilis, Acetobacteria or Gluconacetobacter spp., and baker's yeast. A list of potential biosafe organisms was drawn up by the National Center for Biotechnology Education.

== See also ==
- Synthetic biology
- Genetic engineering
