= FamiLAB =

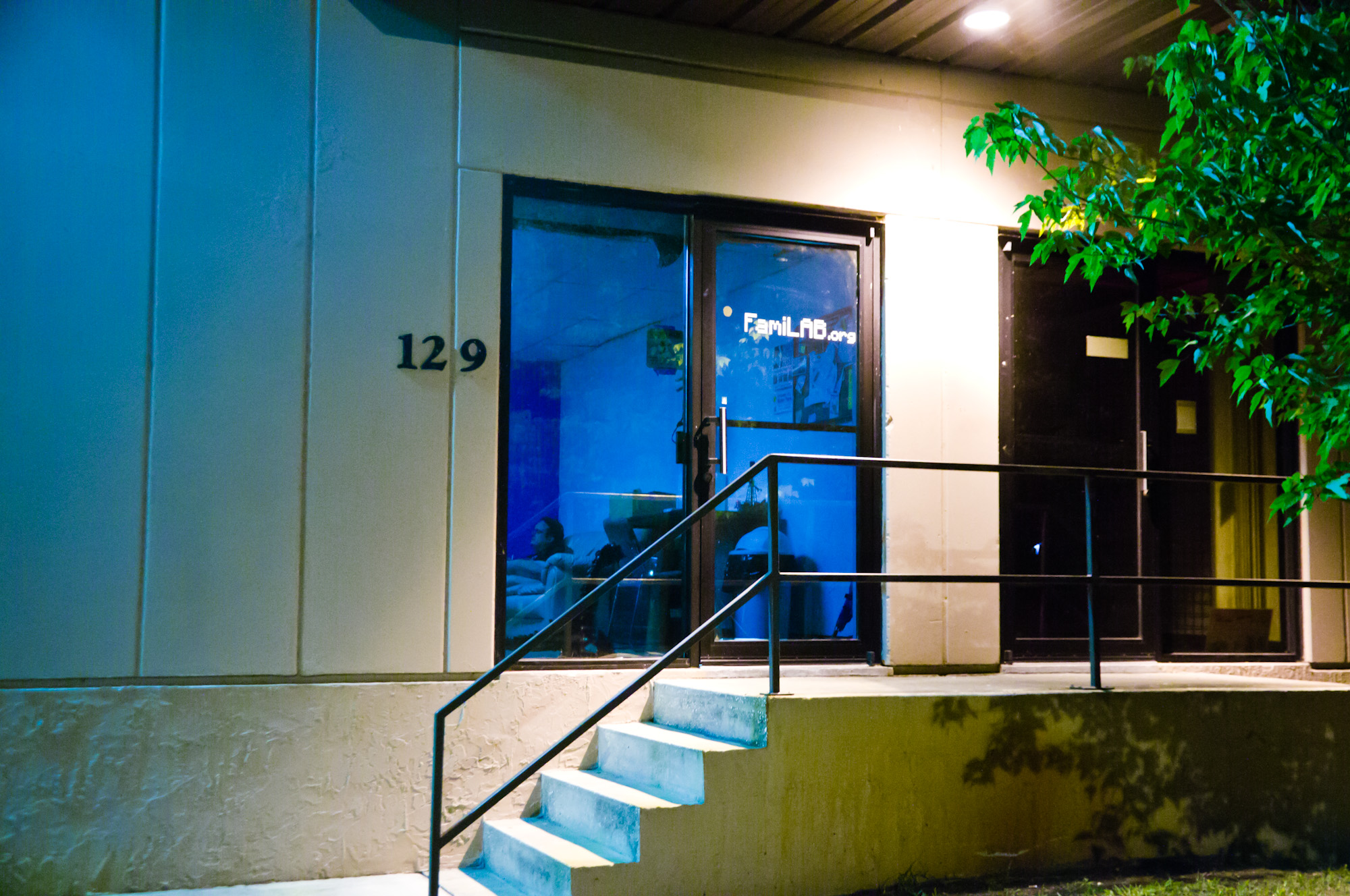
- Location: Longwood, Florida
- Website: https://www.familab.org/

FamiLAB is a makerspace in Longwood, Florida. It is a member-run organization that provides a shared workspace, tools, and equipment for individuals engaged in technical projects. The makerspace hosts workshops, classes, and community events.

As of 2023, it has over 200 members.

== Facilities ==
FamiLAB is equipped with a range of fabrication, laboratory, and creative production facilities. In 2023, the makerspace received a Neptune 4 FDM 3D Printer from Elegoo. Its facilities include a biochemistry laboratory used by a DIY biology group and equipped with a -80 C freezer and a scanning electron microscope, as well as a machine shop containing a CNC machine and manual machine tools such as mini mills and lathes. Additionally spaces support welding(MIG,TIG, and stick welding), stained glass work, and blacksmithing, along with areas for leatherworking, sewing, and other crafts. The makerspace also includes a woodshop with a CNC router and table saw, a fabrication lab with multiple 3D printers and a laser cutter, a screenprinting area with a four-color press, and a darkroom for photography.

The makerspace provides classes and workshops for members and the public.

== History ==
FamiLAB was founded in 2009; the makerspace was originally in a 400-square-foot location before relocating to a 4,000-square-foot warehouse after a member offered them a deal on the lease.

In 2017, FamiLAB members attended the Global Community Bio Summit, hosted by the MIT Media Lab.

The Orlando Maker Faire originated from Makers in FamiLAB.

== See also ==
- Hackerspace
- List of Biomakerspaces in the United States
