= Opentrons =

Bioscience liquid handler manufacturer

Opentrons Labworks Inc.
- Type: Private
- Industry: Biotechnology; Robotics; Automation
- Founded: 2014; 12 years ago
- Founder: Chiu Chau; Will Canine; Nicholas Wagner
- Headquarters: Long Island City, New York, United States
- Key people: Jon Brennan-Badal (CEO)
- Products: OT-1; OT-2; Flex
- Number of employees: 328 (2023)
- Website: opentrons.com

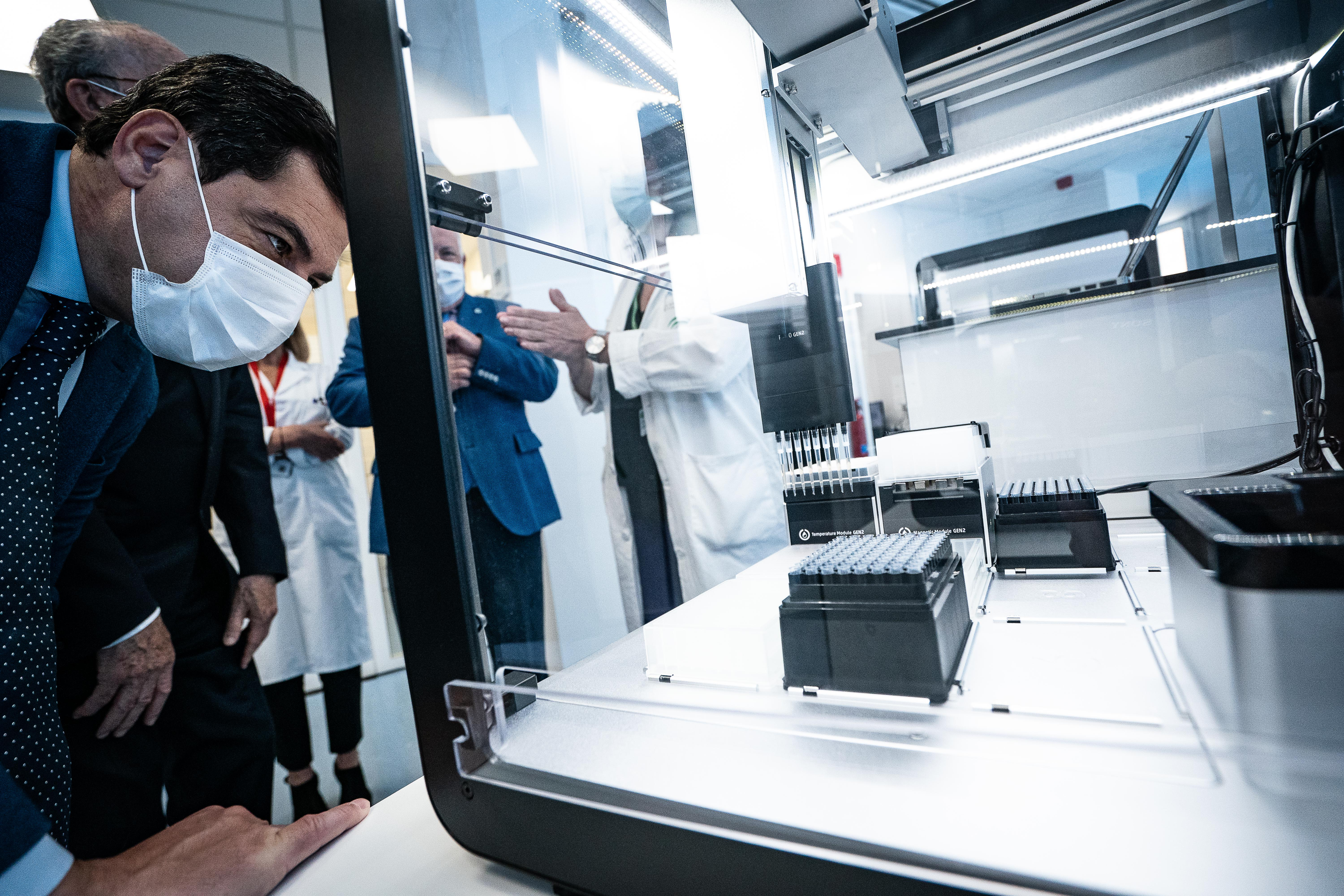
Commissioning of an Opentrons robot in the Regional Hospital of Málaga (2020)

Opentrons Labworks, Inc. (or Opentrons) is a biotechnology company that manufactures liquid handling robots that use open-source software, which at one point used open-source hardware but no longer does. Their robots can be used by scientists to manipulate small volumes of liquids for the purpose of undertaking biochemical or chemical reactions. Currently, they offer the OT-2 and Flex robots. These robots are used primarily by researchers and scientists interested in DIY biology, but they are increasingly being used by other biologists.

== Products ==
Current:

- OT-2 – The OT-2 was released in 2018 and has seen utilization as one of the tools that researchers are leveraging in the fight against COVID-19. The OT-2 and later products, including its electronic micropipettes and hardware modules, are closed source (proprietary) hardware. Only coarse CAD files for the enclosure have been released, with no details on the internals, such that it no longer complies with current open hardware standards. The software remains open source.
- Flex – Successor to the OT-2, the Flex was released in 2023, "measures two feet by two feet by two feet", and is purchased with a one-time cost rather than a robot as a service (RaaS) subscription. Its open-source and accessible API allows it to interact with potential AI tools.
- Flex Prep – Similar to the Flex, the Flex Prep was released in 2024 and provides a no-code software for setting up pipetting tasks and executing that workflow through the Flex Prep touchscreen.

Discontinued:

- OT-1 – The OpenTrons OT-1 was the result of a crowdfunding campaign on the Kickstarter platform and was released in 2015 for $2,000. This robot employed adapters to actuate handheld micropipettes. The release of the OT-1 marked the first commercial open source liquid handling robot in the life science industry. It was also the last in the series to adhere to open hardware standards, however, editable CAD files were not released. It is no longer commercially available, though at least one replication was attempted.

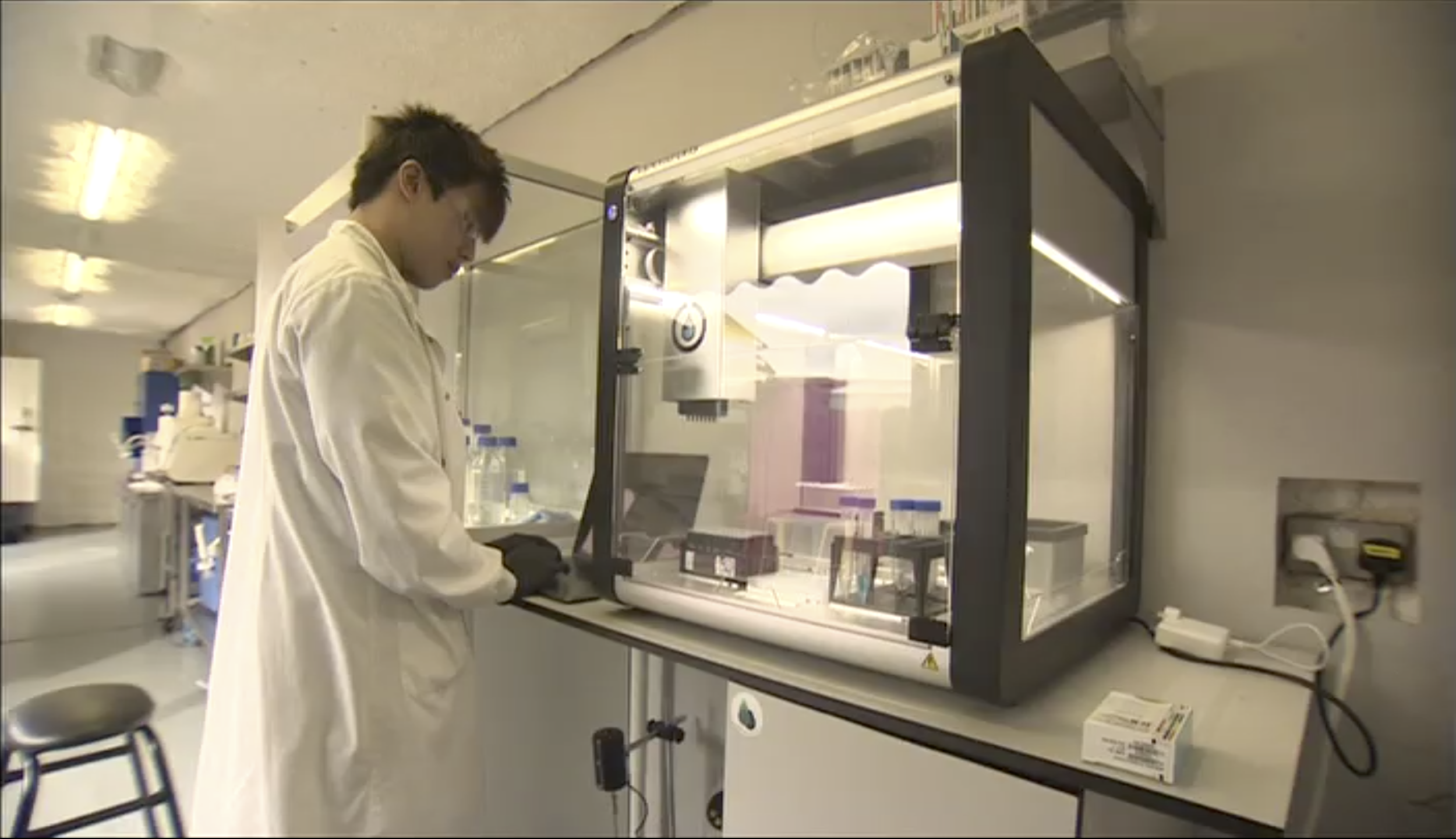
A person using Opentrons liquid handling robot inside one of the OpenCell laboratories.

== History ==
The company originated from Genspace, a community biology laboratory in Brooklyn, New York. Will Canine, a biohacker and former Occupy Wall Street organizer, partnered with Nicholas Wagner and Chiu Chau as his eventual co-founders who he found from a DIY-bio listserve.

In 2014, the startup officially launched with financial backing from HAXLR8TR, a hardware accelerator in Shenzhen, China. In late 2014, they launch a Kickstarter campaign. They show their machine inserting DNA inside E. coli after their campaign successfully gets funded. Jonathan Brennan-Badal, who was VP of strategy at ComiXology and a board member of Genspace, joined Opentrons in 2014 and is the current CEO.

In 2016, Opentrons was part of Y Combinator's Winter cohort of startups.

== Impact ==
Opentrons robots have had a variety of uses in the scientific and DIY community. Scientists at UCSD modified an existing OT-1 robot to automate adding in reagents and imaging their cell signaling experiments. Scientists at Carnegie Mellon University used the OT-2, Opentrons Python API, and OpenAI's GPT-4 to autonomously design, plan, and perform experiments.

During the COVID-19 pandemic, Opentrons helped set up the Pandemic Response Lab (PRL), a sequencing facility located in Queens, New York. Opentrons' robots at the PRL helped speed up turnaround time for COVID-19 testing, going from 7 to 14 days to 12 hours, and reducing costs from $2,000 to under $28. Institutions that made use of Opentrons' robots for COVID-19 testing include: Mayo Clinic, Harvard, Stanford, Caltech, MIT, and BioNTech.

== Subsidiaries ==
As a company, Opentrons has a number of subsidiaries.

- Opentrons Robotics – business unit for user-friendly lab automation
- Pandemic Response Lab (PRL) – in partnership with NYU Langone Health, provides diagnostic lab services to health systems across the US, and as of December 31, 2022 has shut down
- Neochromosome (Neo) – acquired in March 2021, Neo creates genome-scale cell engineering solutions for therapeutics
- Zenith AI – acquired in June 2021, Zenith AI brings no-code AI and modern machine learning to the platform

== See also ==
- Laboratory automation
- Liquid handling robot
- List of biotech and pharmaceutical companies in the New York metropolitan area
