= BioCurious =

Nonprofit biotechnology community laboratory

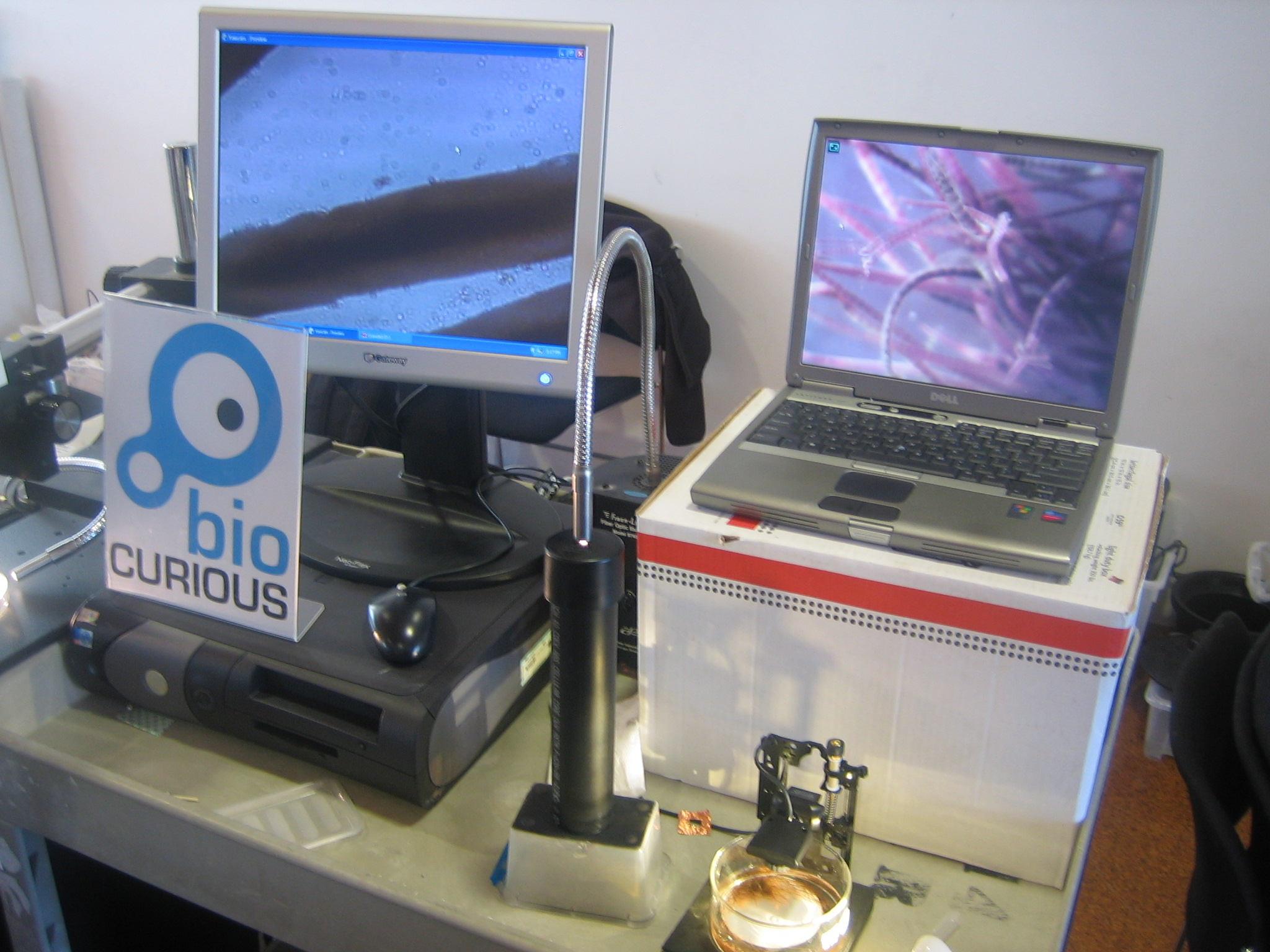
- Formation: 2010
- Purpose: Biohacking, Hacking
- Location: 3108 Patrick Henry Drive Santa Clara, California 95054 United States of America
- Coordinates: 37.3956°N 121.9837°W
- Services: Biosafety Level One lab (BSL-1, membership access
- Website: biocurious.org

BioCurious is a community biology laboratory and nonprofit organization located in Santa Clara, California, cofounded by Eri Gentry, Kristina Hathaway, Joseph Jackson, Tito Jankowski, Raymond McCauley, and Josh Perfetto. The company was originally funded through Kickstarter by 239 backers who raised $35,319.

The BioCurious website states that it is "a community biology lab" to encourage innovation and experimentation in biological sciences by increasing accessibility to professional-grade spaces. The Kickstarter campaign to fund BioCurious began in 2010, and the lab first opened October 2011 in Sunnyvale, California. Later, the lab moved to Santa Clara.

The BioCurious lab space was used by The Glowing Plant, a crowdfunded project attempting to engineer a bioluminescent tree with the goal to replace street lamps, which eventually shut down due to a lack of progress and insufficient funding. The company was praised by Rob Carlsen, director of the carbon removal company Planetary Technologies, on his personal blog as a "a good foundation to build on". In 2016, the University of California Santa Cruz cited the lab as an influential part of its alumnus Antonio Lamb's participation in synthetic biology. Lamb founded Microsynbiotix, a company specializing in oral vaccines, later acquired by the environmental consulting company Sundew.

In 2013, cofounder Kristina Hathaway quit her position, stating "I’m seeing lots of political maneuvering and divisive finger pointing at a time when we should be banding together to turn things around. It’s sad, and it’s shameful," in her public resignation letter. The Scientific American covered her departure, claiming that BioCurious could not cover its monthly expenses of US$6,000 to US$8,000. As of May 2026, the board members listed on the company's website are Joe Bamberg, Maria Chavez, Eric Espinosa, Eri Gentry, Jay Hanson, Innokenti Toulokhonov, and Ulrike Pflückhahn.

== See also ==
- List of Biomakerspaces in the United States
