= Boston Open Source Science Laboratory =

Coordinates: 42°24′7″N 71°7′7.56″W

- Type: 501(c)(3) nonprofit
- Location: Somerville, Massachusetts
- President: Dr. Wendy Pouliot
- Website: https://boslab.org/

Boston Open Science Laboratory (BOSLab) is a 501(c)(3) nonprofit BSL-1 biomakerspace in Somerville, Massachusetts. BOSLab is a community science lab designed to make molecular biology and biotech education accessible to all skill levels. The lab is considered part of the DIYbio and biohacking movement.

== History ==
BOSLab opened in 2009 in Somerville’s Davis Square before relocating to Cambridge in 2019. It originated as the Boston Open Source Science Lab operating out of a garage and occupying a small space. The organization later expanded to a 1,300-square-foot space in The Hive at Boynton Yards, an arts and creative enterprise space.

== Facilities ==
BOSLab is a biosafety level 1 laboratory, primarily working with non-pathogenic organisms such as yeast and E. coli. Its facility includes laboratory benches for experiments, refrigeration and freezer units, incubators, and equipment for genetic amplification, analysis, imaging, and sterilization. The space also contains storage for chemicals and reagents, safety equipment, and a separate room for donated equipment. Much of the lab’s equipment is sourced through donations and secondary markets, including surplus laboratory equipment acquired from institutions and commercial resale platforms such as eBay.

Members are required to complete safety training, and projects are reviewed through an internal oversight process prior to approval.

=== Education ===
The makerspace provides educational classes and runs several programs, including an artist-in-residence program, a scientist-in-training program, workforce development initiatives, and an entrepreneurship program. Classes cover topics in biotechnology and genetic engineering, often combining instruction with hands-on laboratory work.

BOSLab hosts an International Genetically Engineered Machine (iGEM) team that participates in the annual synthetic biology competition. In 2024, the team developed a synthetic biology approach to produce heparin using a transformed strain of Escherichia coli, leveraging its natural production of heparosan to reduce enzymatic processing steps and address concerns about current animal-derived production methods. In 2025, the team designed a CRISPR-SHERLOCK–based biosensor for detecting toxic algal blooms caused by Microcystis aeruginosa, targeting expression of genes in the mcy biosynthetic cluster associated with microcystin production.

== Major projects ==
- Lightbulb PCR, which aims to build an inexpensive PCR thermal cycler using PVC tubing, an incandescent light bulb and a computer fan run with an open source microcontroller.
- BlueGene - Indigo Biosynthesis In E. Coli

== See also ==
- List of Biomakerspaces in the United States
