= OpenCell =

OpenCell is a laboratory in London.

== Laboratories ==
OpenCell is primarily used for work related to biochemical and biomolecular activities such as DNA sequencing. It opened to the public in June 2018. The space uses shipping containers to house biotechnology laboratories. The laboratories contain biotechnology equipment including real-time PCR instruments, Plate reader, Opentrons liquid handling robots, flow hoods, non-ducted fume cupboards, -80, -20 and 4C storage, incubators (static/shaking), centrifuges (1ml-50ml refrigerated), and bench space

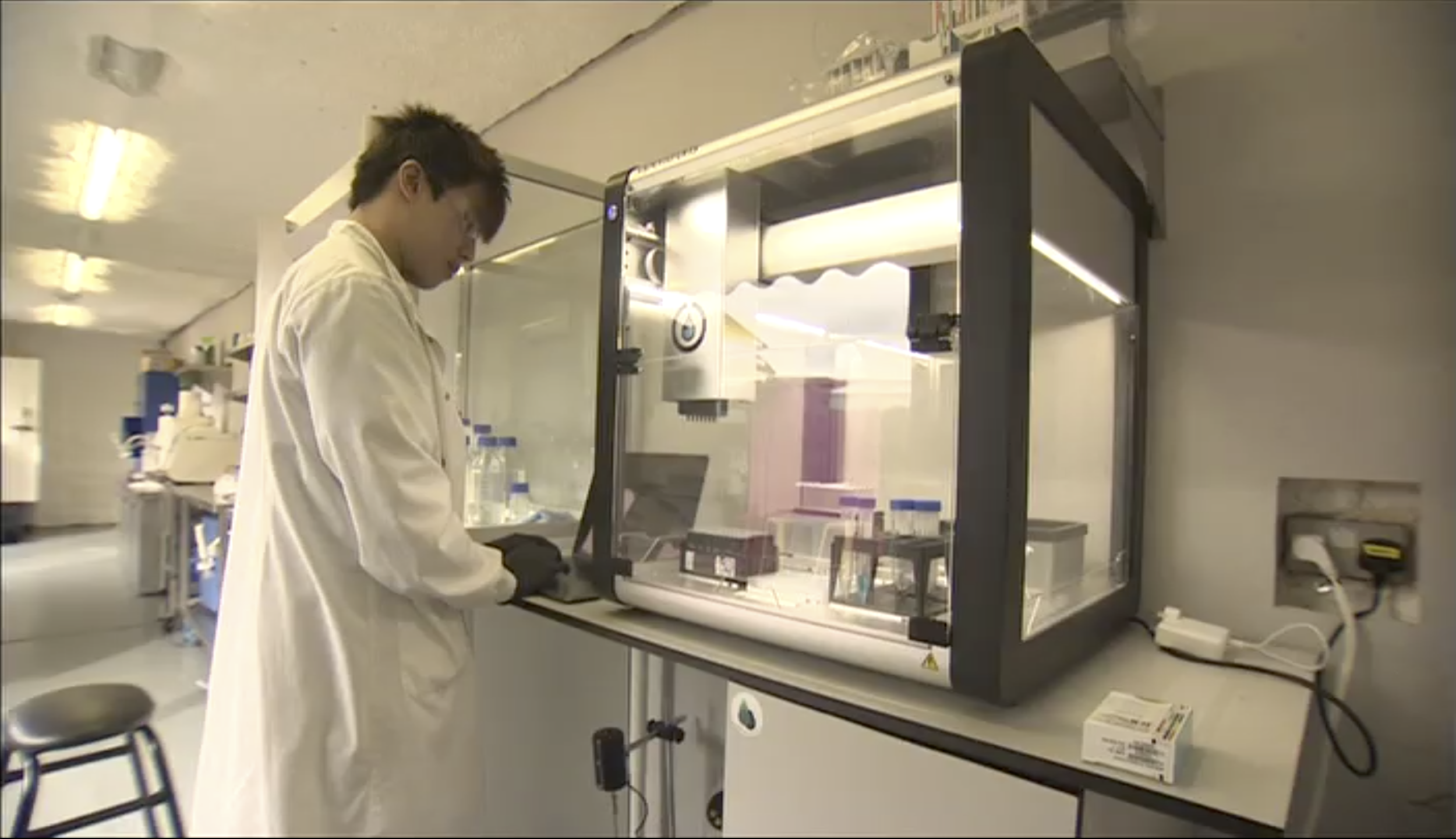
A person using Opentrons liquid handling robot inside one of the opencell laboratories.

== COVID-19 testing ==
In August 2020, a shipping container laboratory for COVID-19 diagnostics was delivered to the Bailiwick of Jersey. The laboratory began processing tests on Tuesday, September 15, with 170 samples, collected from arriving airport passengers, processed within an average of 12 hours. Deputy Medical Officer of Health Dr Ivan Muscat said: "The opening of the covid-19 laboratory is a significant milestone in managing Jersey's testing requirements."

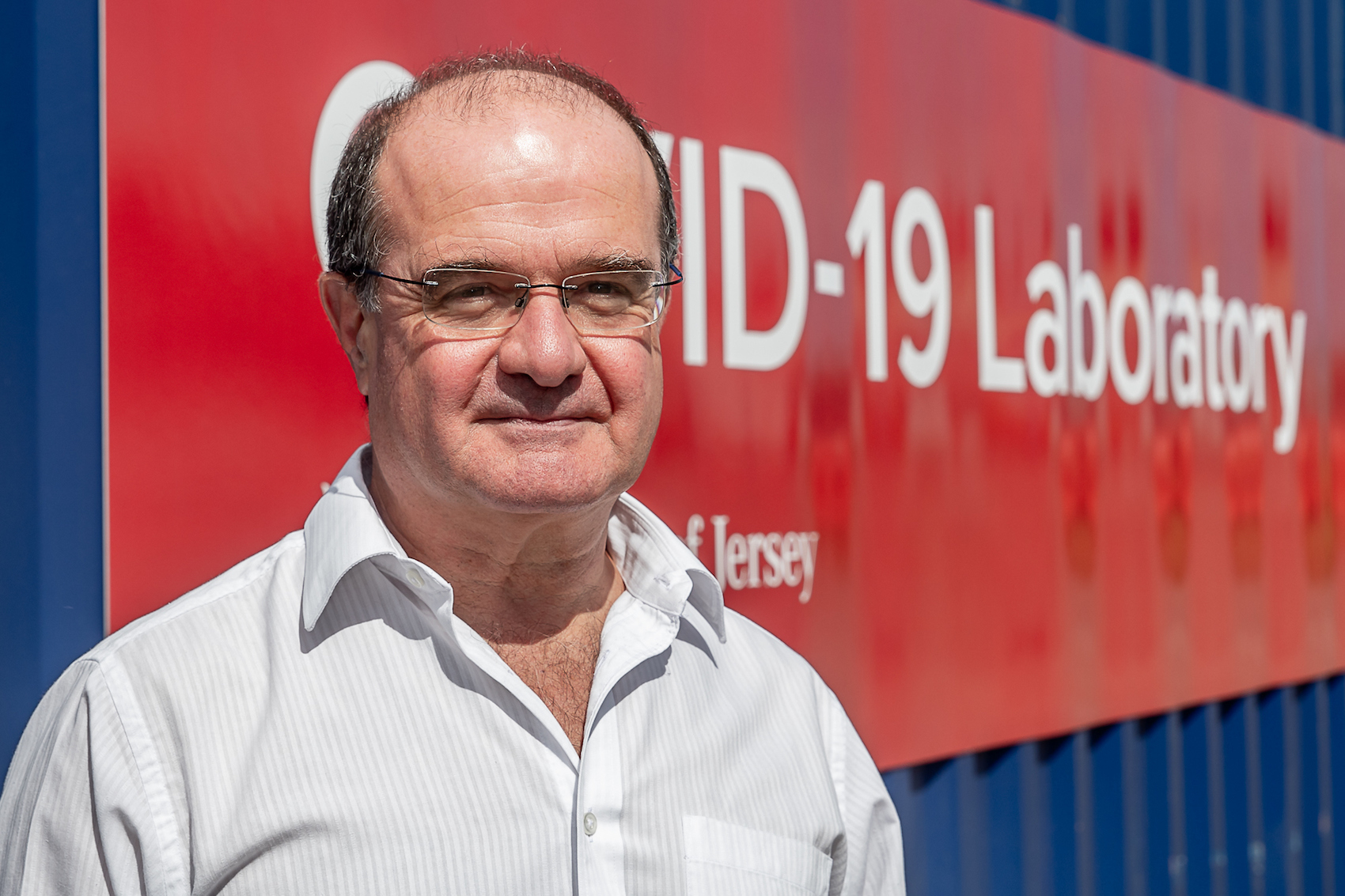
Dr Ivan Muscat at the shipping container laboratory, which is in a car park near the Airport.
