= Vilcek Institute of Graduate Biomedical Sciences =

Graduate division of New York University

- Established: 1980
- Parent institution: New York University
- Location: New York City, NY

The Vilcek Institute of Graduate Biomedical Sciences (formerly the Sackler Institute of Graduate Biomedical Sciences) at the NYU School of Medicine is a division of the New York University Graduate School of Arts and Science, leading to the Ph.D. degree and, in coordination with the Medical Scientist Training Program, combined M.D./Ph.D. degrees. The institute sets the policies for its admissions, curriculum, stipend levels, student evaluations and Ph.D. requirements.

In the Chronicle of Higher Education's 2007 Faculty Scholarly Productivity Index, the Vilcek Institute ranked as the number 8 Biomedical Sciences program, nationally. Four of the Vilcek Institute's programs also ranked in the top ten of their respective disciplines.

== Curriculum ==
Vilcek Institute's degree programs are:

- Biochemistry and Molecular Biophysics
- Biomaterials Science
- Biomedical Imaging
- Biostatistics
- Cell & Molecular Biology
- Computational Biology
- Developmental Genetics
- Epidemiology
- Immunology and Inflammation
- Parasitology
- Microbiology
- Molecular Oncology & Immunology
- Molecular Pharmacology
- Neuroscience & Physiology
- Pathobiology
- Stem Cell Biology
- Structural Biology

In their first year, all students take half of their course work in a core curriculum (biochemistry, cellular and molecular biology, cell signaling, bio-informatics and genetics) and the remainder in a wide variety of electives. First year students are also required to complete at least 3 three-month lab rotations. By the end of the first year, students must select a thesis mentor and program. Then, after becoming a member of a specific program, students must meet the academic requirements of that program. At the end of the second year, Vilcek students must also pass qualifying examinations before moving on to thesis research.

The average time to degree at the Vilcek Institute is 5.4 years.

== Facilities ==
The Vilcek Institute is housed at the Langone Medical Center, which also houses the NYU School of Medicine, Tisch Hospital, the Rusk Institute of Rehabilitation Medicine and the Skirball Institute of Biomolecular Medicine.

The Vilcek Institute's faculty consists of >180 faculty members at the Medical Center whose appointments are in basic science or clinical departments, as well as associated faculty located at the main campus (Applied Mathematics, Biology, Chemistry, Computer Sciences, Center for Neural Science and Physics).

== Name controversy ==
Following allegations of mass addiction caused by the promotion of opioids by the Sackler family and associated companies, NYU announces that "continuing to use the Sackler name as inconsistent with our institution’s values and incompatible with our mission, which is dedicated to patient care, education, and research to improve human health." The school was renamed the Vilcek Institute of Graduate Biomedical Sciences.

== Notable people ==
=== Faculty ===
- Rodolfo Llinas, Professor of Neuroscience and Physiology
- Martin J. Blaser, Professor, M.D., 1973, established the Foundation for Bacteria
- Richard W. Tsien, former Director of the NYU Neuroscience Institute, a world leader in the study of calcium channels and neurotransmission

=== Alumni ===
- Jan Vilcek, Professor of Microbiology, inventor of Remicade
- Severo Ochoa, Professor of Biochemistry, Nobel laureate for the synthesis of RNA
- Arthur Kornberg, student of Severo Ochoa, Nobel laureate for discovery of the mechanisms of DNA synthesis
- Homer Smith, kidney research and the discovery of insulin
- Ruth Sonntag Nussenzweig, C.V. Starr Professor of Medical and Molecular Parasitology, breakthroughs in Malaria vaccinations
