= Do-it-yourself biology =

Biotechnological social movement

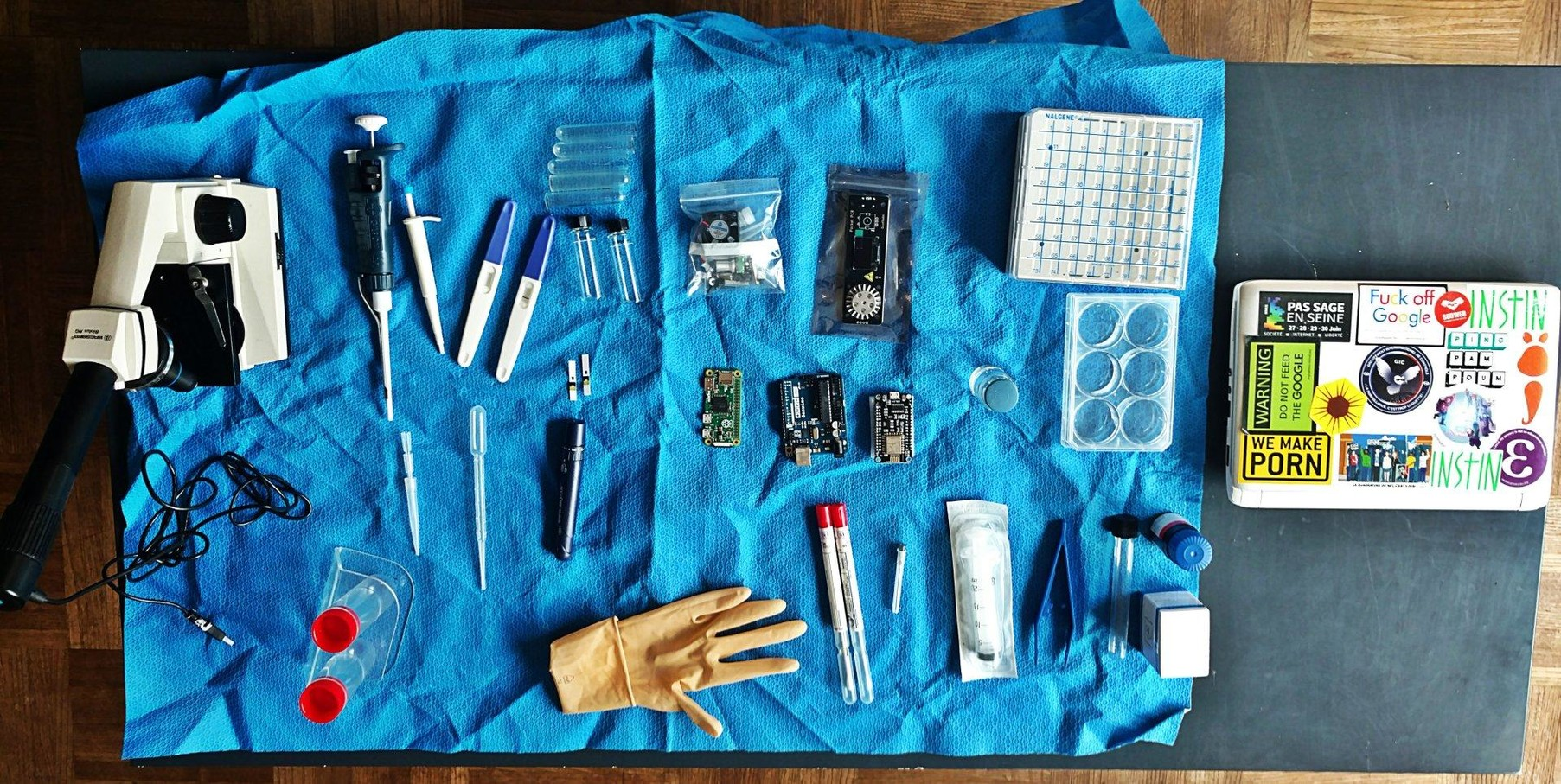
Preparation of a biohacking kit for a biology workshop in popular education in a café in Rennes in 2020

Do-it-yourself biology (DIY biology, DIY bio) is a biotechnological social movement in which individuals, communities, and small organizations study biology and life science using the same methods as traditional research institutions. DIY bio practices may be undertaken by individuals at any educational level, but is primarily done by individuals with formal post-secondary science education. This may be done as a hobby, as a not-for-profit endeavor for community learning and open-science innovation, or for profit, to start a business.

Other terms are also associated with the do-it-yourself biology community. The terms biohacking and wetware hacking emphasize the connection to hacker culture and the hacker ethic. The term hacker is used in the original sense of finding new and clever ways to do things. The term biohacking is also used by the grinder body modification community, which is considered related but distinct from the do-it-yourself biology movement. The term biopunk emphasizes the techno-progressive, political, and artistic elements of the movement.

== History ==
The term "biohacking" as well as the concept of do-it-yourself biology has been known as early as 1988.

Biohacking entered the San Francisco programmer and maker communities as early as 2005, through simple demonstrations of basic experiments. As DIYbio experiments became the focus of SuperHappyDevHouse hackers, the hobby gained additional momentum.

In 2005 Rob Carlson wrote in an article in Wired: "The era of garage biology is upon us. Want to participate? Take a moment to buy yourself a lab on eBay." He then set up a garage lab the same year, working on a project he had previously worked at the Molecular Sciences Institute in Berkeley, California.

In 2008, the DIYbio organization was founded by Jason Bobe and Mackenzie Cowell and its first meeting held.

In 2010, Genspace opened the first community biology lab, Ten months later it was followed by BioCurious, and Victoria Makerspace. Many other labs and organizations followed, including but not limited to Counter Culture Labs in Oakland, CA, Baltimore Underground Science Space in Baltimore, MD, TheLab in Los Angeles, CA, Denver Biolabs in Denver, CO, and SoundBio Lab in Seattle, WA.

It has been estimated that in 2014 there have been 50 DIY biology labs around the world.

In 2016, the first conference to focus specifically on biohacking was announced to take place in September in Oakland, CA.

DIY biology is projected to develop even more into structured systems that have built legitimacy and public trust, with a community behind it that can be scientifically credible.

== Aspects ==
The DIYbio movement seeks to revise the notion that one must be an academic with an advanced degree to make any significant contribution to the biology community. It allows large numbers of small organizations and individuals to participate in research and development, with spreading knowledge a higher priority than turning profits. The DIY Biology Movement revolves around the ideals of using non-establishment research in order to allow for the freedom of research by people who are not considered qualified by regulatory bodies. In recent years, there are various DIY ways to live healthy and many of them also focuses on different simple ways to biohack mind, body, metabolism, and sleep.

The motivations for DIY biology include (but aren't limited to) lowered costs, entertainment, medicine, biohacking, life extension, and education. Recent work combining open-source hardware of microcontrollers like the Arduino and RepRap 3D printers, very low-cost scientific instruments have been developed.

=== Community laboratory space ===
Many organizations maintain a laboratory akin to a wet-lab makerspace, providing equipment and supplies for members. Many organizations also run classes and provide training. For a fee (usually between $50 and $100), members can join some spaces and do experiments on their own. DIY biology laboratories often use online forums, social media, and websites to communicate with other laboratories and DIY Biology enthusiasts in order to share their research with other laboratory bodies and communities.

=== Open source equipment ===
The DIY biology movement attempts to make available the tools and resources necessary for anyone, including non-professionals, to conduct biological engineering. One of the first pieces of open source laboratory equipment developed was the Dremelfuge by Irish biohacker Cathal Garvey, which uses a 3D printed tube holder attached to a Dremel rotary tool to spin tubes at high speeds, replacing often expensive centrifuges. Many other devices like PCR machines have been recreated extensively. In recent times, more complex devices have been created such as the OpenDrop digital microfluidics platform and the DIY NanoDrop both developed by GaudiLabs. Opentrons makes open-source software, affordable lab robots, and got its start as a DIY biology collaboration at Genspace. Incuvers makes telemetric chambers for cellular research that are affordable and allow for complete customizability of their environments. OpenCell, a London-based biotech lab provider hosts regular biohackathons to help encourage more opensource development.

=== Advocacy ===
Most advocacy in biohacking is about the safety, accessibility and future legality of experimentation. DIY Biology findings are unregulated for the most part and therefore are deemed trustworthy by Trust Architecture, which the laboratories founded. Trust Architecture is a set of systems that make a source or laboratory credible using infrastructure. Todd Kuiken of the Woodrow Wilson Center proposes that through safety and self-governance, DIY biologists won't be in need of regulation. Jo Zayner has proposed that safety is inherent in biohacking and that accessibility should be the foremost concern as there is large underrepresentation of social and ethnic minorities in biohacking.

== Research topics ==
Many biohacking projects revolve around the modification of life and molecular and genetic engineering.

=== Genetic engineering ===
Genetic Engineers are a subculture of biohackers as one of the most accessible forms of biohacking is through engineering microorganisms or plants. Experiments can range from using plasmids to fluorescent bacteria, controlling gene expression using light in bacteria, even using CRISPR to engineer the genome of bacteria or yeast.

=== Medicine ===
Restricted access to medical care and medicine has pushed biohackers to start experimenting in medically related fields. The Open Insulin project aims to make the recombinant protein insulin more accessible by creating an open source protocol for expression and purification. Other experiments that have involved medical treatments include a whole body microbiome transplant and the creation of open source artificial pancreases for diabetics, such as OpenAPS, Loop and AndroidAPS. Many initiatives have taken place using DIY Biology to help people medically during the COVID-19 pandemic, such as the Rapid Deployment Vaccine Collaborative (RaDVaC), which is a group made up of Harvard and MIT scientists who synthesized and researched a COVID-19 vaccine using their own personal lab. Other laboratory spaces created medical-grade face shields and other COVID-19 relief mechanisms in response to the pandemic.

=== Implants ===
Grinders are a subculture of biohackers that focus on implanting technology or introducing chemicals into the body to enhance or change their bodies' functionality.

Some biohackers can now sense which direction they face using a magnetic implant that vibrates against the skin.

=== Art ===
In 2000, controversial and self-described "transgenic artist" Eduardo Kac appropriated standard laboratory work by biotechnology and genetics researchers in order to both utilize and critique such scientific techniques. In the only putative work of transgenic art by Kac, the artist claimed to have collaborated with a French laboratory (belonging to the Institut National de la Recherche Agronomique) to procure a green-fluorescent rabbit: a rabbit with a green fluorescent protein gene from a type of jellyfish (Aequorea victoria) in order for the rabbit to fluoresce green under ultraviolet light. The claimed work came to be known as the "GFP bunny", and which Kac called Alba. This claim by Kac has been disputed by the scientists at the lab who noted that they had performed exactly the same experiment (i.e., the insertion of the jellyfish GFP protein-coding gene) on numerous other animals (cats, dogs, etc.) previously and did not create Alba (known to the researchers only as "Rabbit Number 5256") under the direction of Kac. The laboratory consequently kept possession of the transgenic rabbit which it had created and funded and the "transgenic art" was never exhibited at the Digital Avignon festival [2000] as intended. Kac—claiming that his rabbit was the first GFP bunny created in the name of Art—used this dispute to popularize the issue as one of disguised censorship by launching a "Free Alba" campaign. A doctored photo of the artist holding a day-glow-green tinted rabbit appears on his website. The members of the Critical Art Ensemble have written books and staged multimedia performance interventions around this issue, including The Flesh Machine (focusing on in vitro fertilisation, surveillance of the body, and liberal eugenics) and Cult of the New Eve (In order to analyze how, in their words, "Science is the institution of authority regarding the production of knowledge, and tends to replace this particular social function of conventional Christianity in the west").

== Criticism and concerns ==
Biohacking experiences many of the same criticisms as synthetic biology and genetic engineering already receive, plus other concerns relating to the distributed and non-institutional nature of the work, involving potential hazards with a lack of oversight by professionals or governments. Concerns about biohackers creating pathogens in unmonitored garage laboratories led the Federal Bureau of Investigation (FBI) to begin sending its representatives to DIYbio conferences in 2009. The arrest and prosecution of some members for their work with harmless microbes, such as artivist Steve Kurtz, has been denounced as political repression by critics who argue the U.S. government has used post-9/11 anti-terrorism powers to intimidate artists and others who use their art to criticize society.

Existing regulations are not specific to this field, so that the possibility of pathogenic organisms being created and released unintentionally or intentionally by biohackers has become a matter of concern, for example, in the spirit of the re-creation of the 1917 flu virus by Armed Forces Institute of Pathology researchers in 2005. In the US the FBI Weapons of Mass Destruction Directorate has worked with the American Association for the Advancement of Science's National Science Advisory Board for Biosecurity to convene a series of meetings to discuss biosecurity, which have included discussions of amateur biologists and ways to manage the risks to society it poses. At the National Institutes of Health, National Science Advisory Board for Biosecurity leads efforts to educate the public on "dual use research of concern", for example with websites like "Science Safety Security". In 2011, DIYbio organized conferences to attempt to create codes of ethics for biohackers.

A 2007 ETC Group report warns that the danger of this development is not just bioterror, but "bio-error".

Further regulation into research conducted by these DIY Biology laboratories could lead them to being able to produce government-backed data. However, the movement was founded on the core ideals of unregulated biological innovations. In order to keep these laboratories accountable, Trust Architecture and regulatory bodies are implemented in the community to ensure accountability.

While detractors argue that do-it-yourself biologists need some sort of supervision, enthusiasts argue that uniform supervision is impossible and the best way to prevent accidents or malevolence is to encourage a culture of transparency, where, in essence, do-it-yourself biologists would be peer-reviewed by other biohackers. DIYbio argues that fear of potential hazards should be met with increased research and education rather than closing the door on the profound positive impacts that distributed biological technology will have on human health, the environment, and the standard of living around the world. Due to the lack of precedent regarding such a business model, the DIYbio founders see this as an opportunity to be innovators in regulatory and safety policy.

Given the ongoing controversy surrounding biosafety, one of the ways people can become more aware of how to incorporate safety is through understanding which levels of experimentation require regulation. According to the National Institute of Health guidelines for research involving recombinant DNA, experiments are categorized based on their potential risk, with higher-risk work, such as manipulating pathogenic organisms. While lower-risk activities, such as basic laboratory techniques that do not involve harmful agents, may be exempt or require minimal oversight.

== Groups and organizations ==
- Baltimore Underground Science Space (BUGSS), in Baltimore, Maryland
- Biocurious, in Sunnyvale, California
- Boston Open Science Laboratory (BOSLab), in Cambridge, Massachusetts
- Counter Culture Labs, in Oakland, California
- Four Thieves Vinegar Collective
- Genspace, in Brooklyn, New York
- the Open Insulin Project, an international collaboration
- Victoria Makerspace, in Victoria, British Columbia
- DIYbio, an online network
- Biohacking Village, a village within DEF CON, the cybersecurity conference
- SoundBio Lab, a DIY biology makerspace in Seattle, Washington

== See also ==
- Amateur chemistry
- Open science
- Body hacking
