= Genspace =

Non-profit organization in Brooklyn, NY

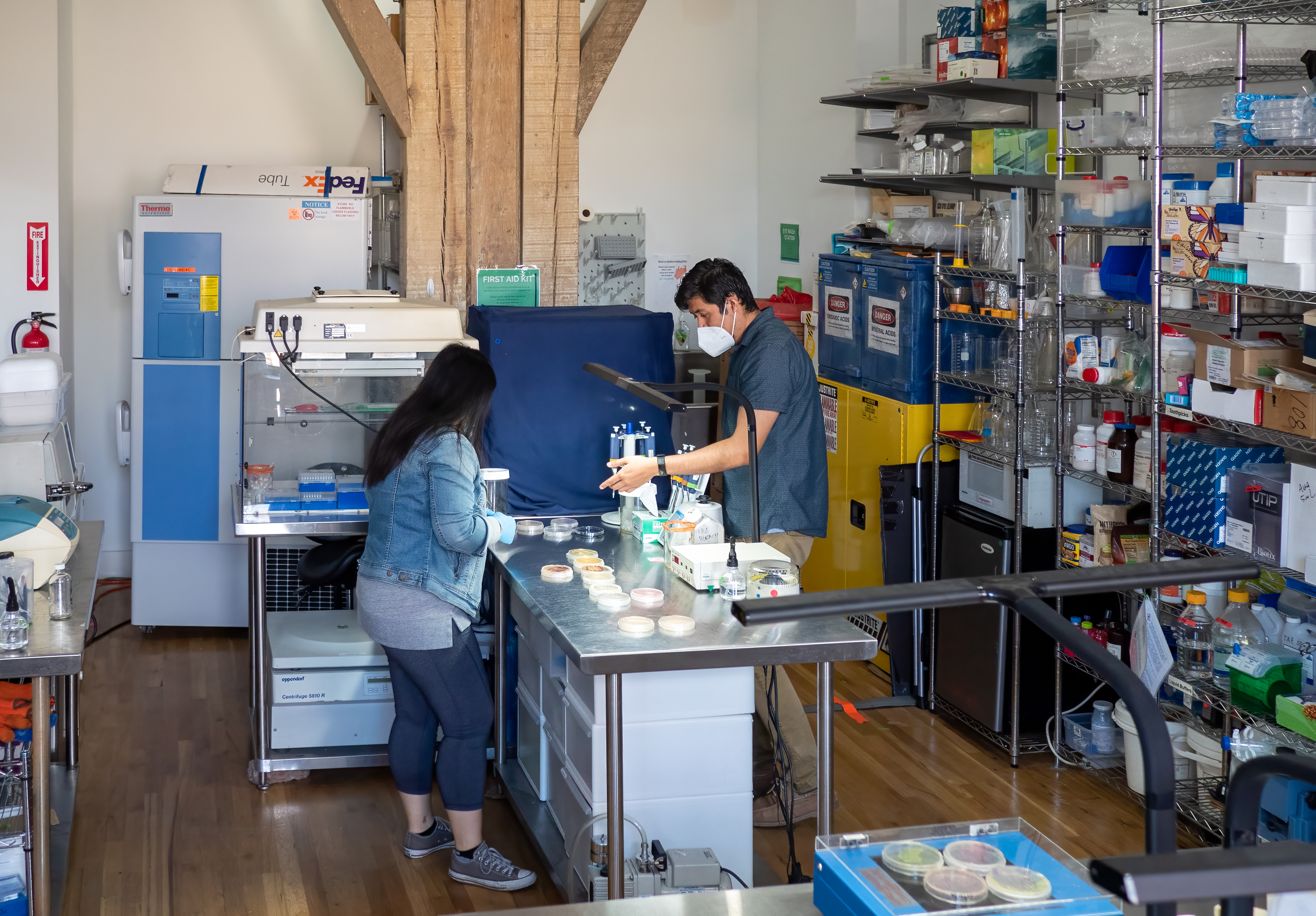
- Formation: 2009
- Purpose: Biohacking, Hacking
- Location: 140 32nd St, Suite 108, Brooklyn, NY 11232
- Coordinates: 40.6877089°N 73.9798782°W
- Services: Biosafety Level One lab, membership access, educational workshops, student programs
- Key people: Ellen Jorgensen, Daniel Grushkin, Oliver Medvedik, Nurit Bar-Shai
- Website: genspace.org

Genspace is a non-profit organization and a community biology laboratory located in Brooklyn, New York. Stemming from the hacking, biohacking, and DIYbio movements, Genspace has focused (since 2009) on supporting citizen science and public access to biotechnology. Genspace opened the first community biology lab in 2010 and a Biosafety Level One laboratory in December of that year. Since its opening, Genspace has supported projects, events, courses, art, and general community resources concerning biology, biotechnology, synthetic biology, genetic engineering, citizen science, open source software, open source hardware, and more.

A collaboration between Genspace and Cold Spring Harbor Laboratory earned a second place win from the American Society for Microbiology's 2015 AgarArt competition.

In February 2024, the New York City Economic Development Corporation (NYCEDC) announced the launch of Genspace's Break into Biotech program, a workforce development initiative designed to provide biotechnology training, mentorship, and career development opportunities for New Yorkers. NYCEDC allocated $500,000 to Genspace to operate the program, which was intended to support up to 60 participants across five cohorts.

In 2025, the New York City Economic Development Corporation (NYCEDC) announced that Genspace had joined a consortium of leading academic institutions selected to operate Gotham Foundry, the nation’s first sustainable materials innovation hub.

Gallery

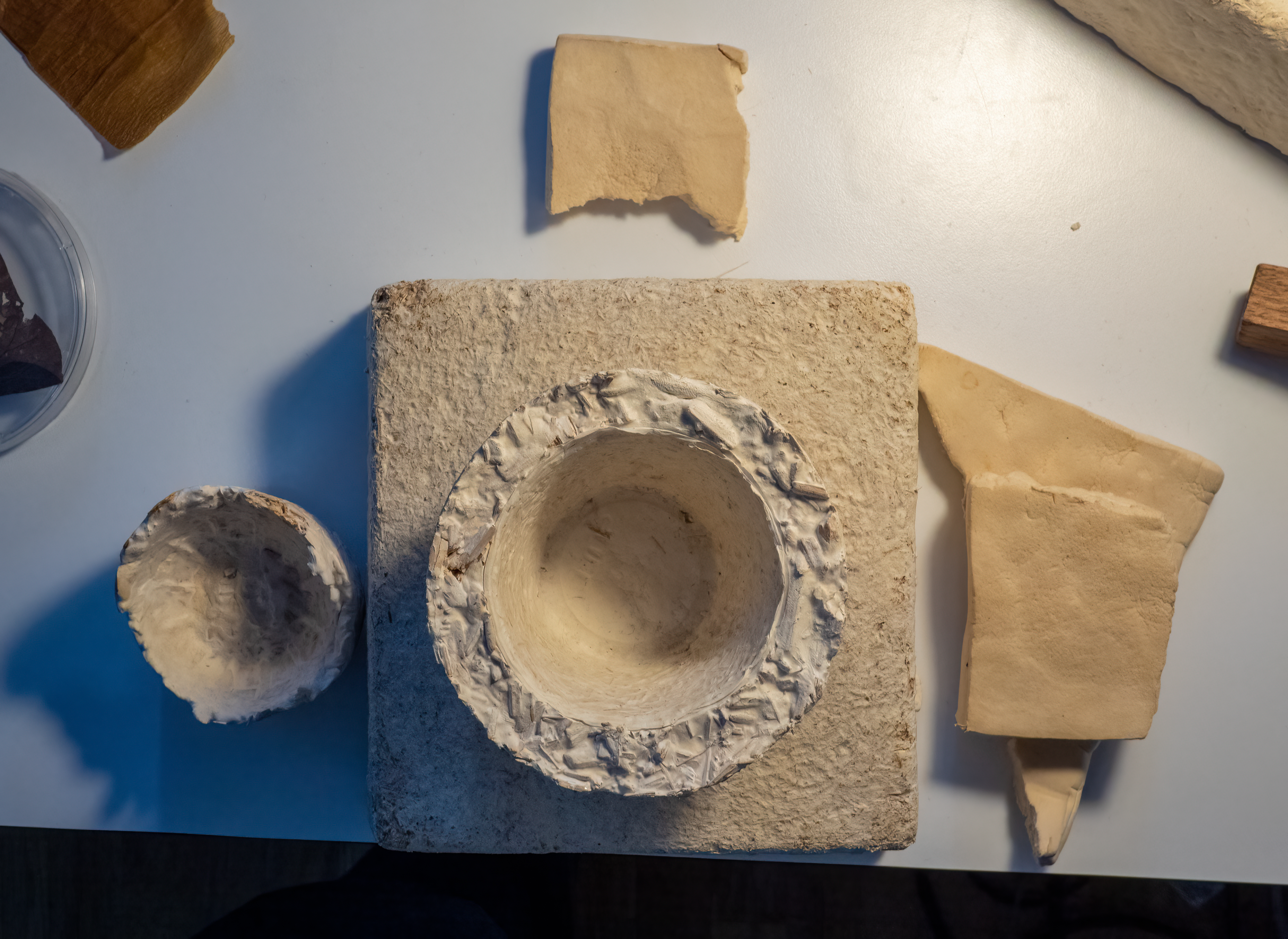
Objects made from mycelium

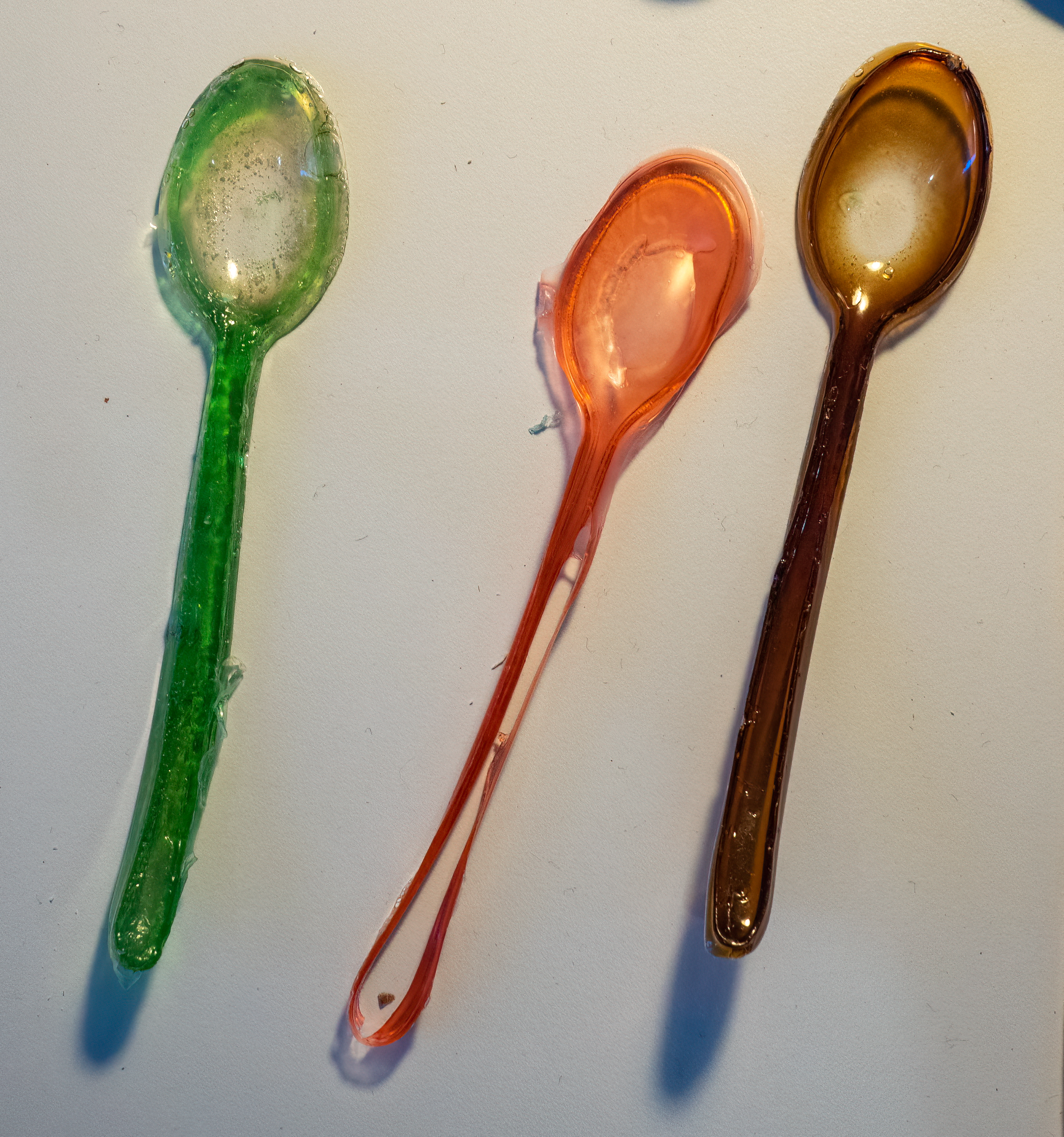
Spoons made of various organic materials, used in place of plastics

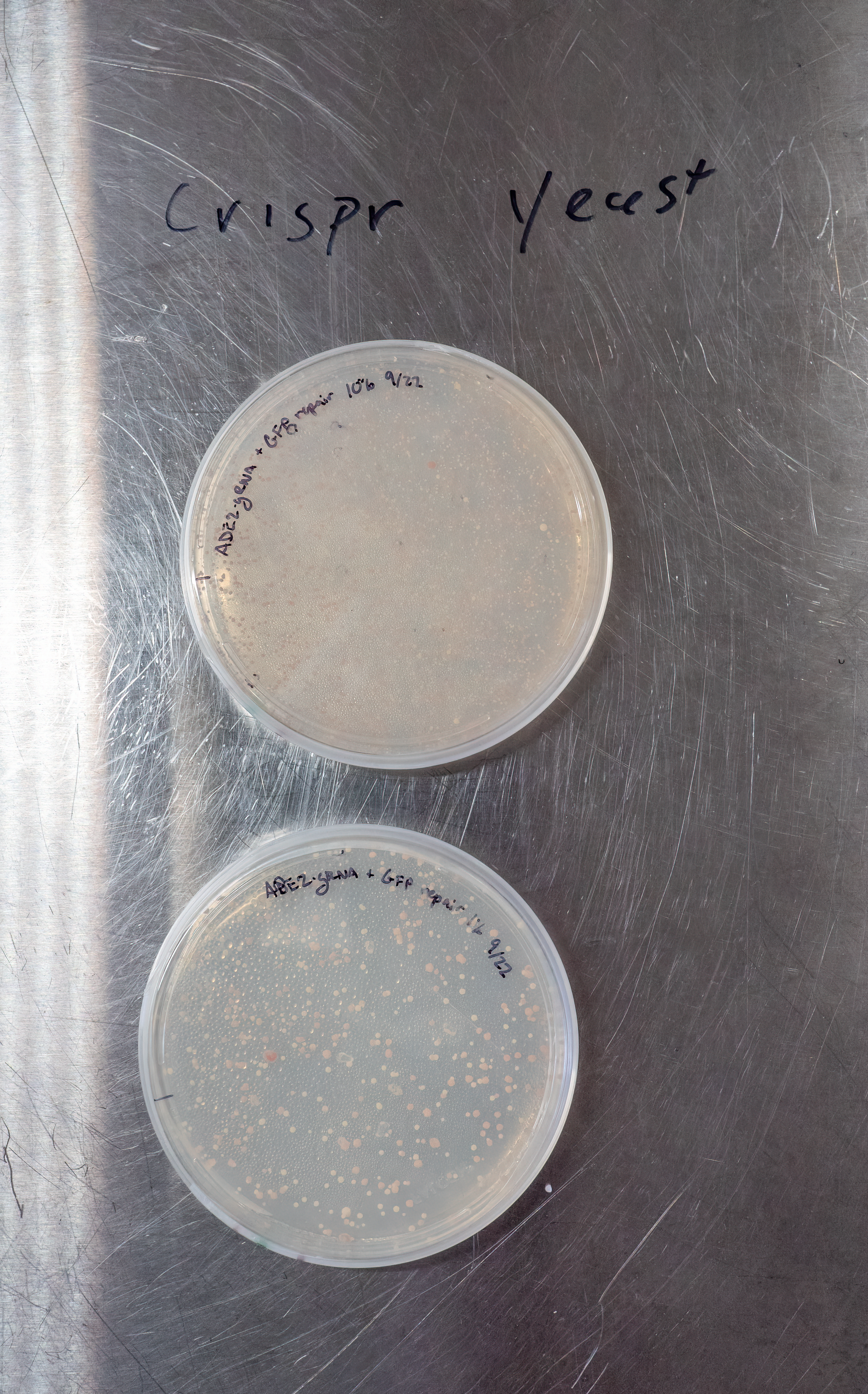
CRISPR yeast

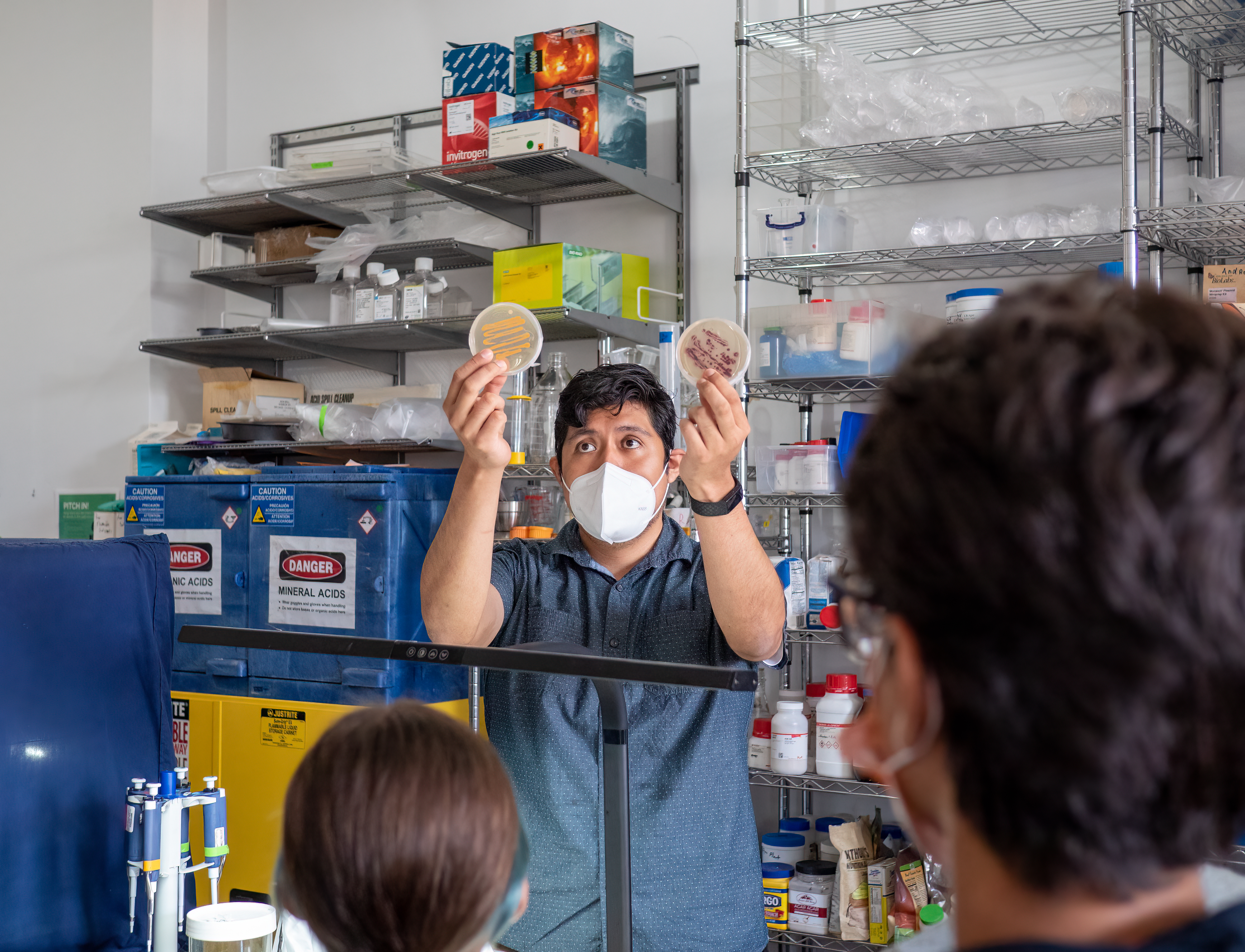
The Genspace lab manager holds up microbe dye strains for a tour group

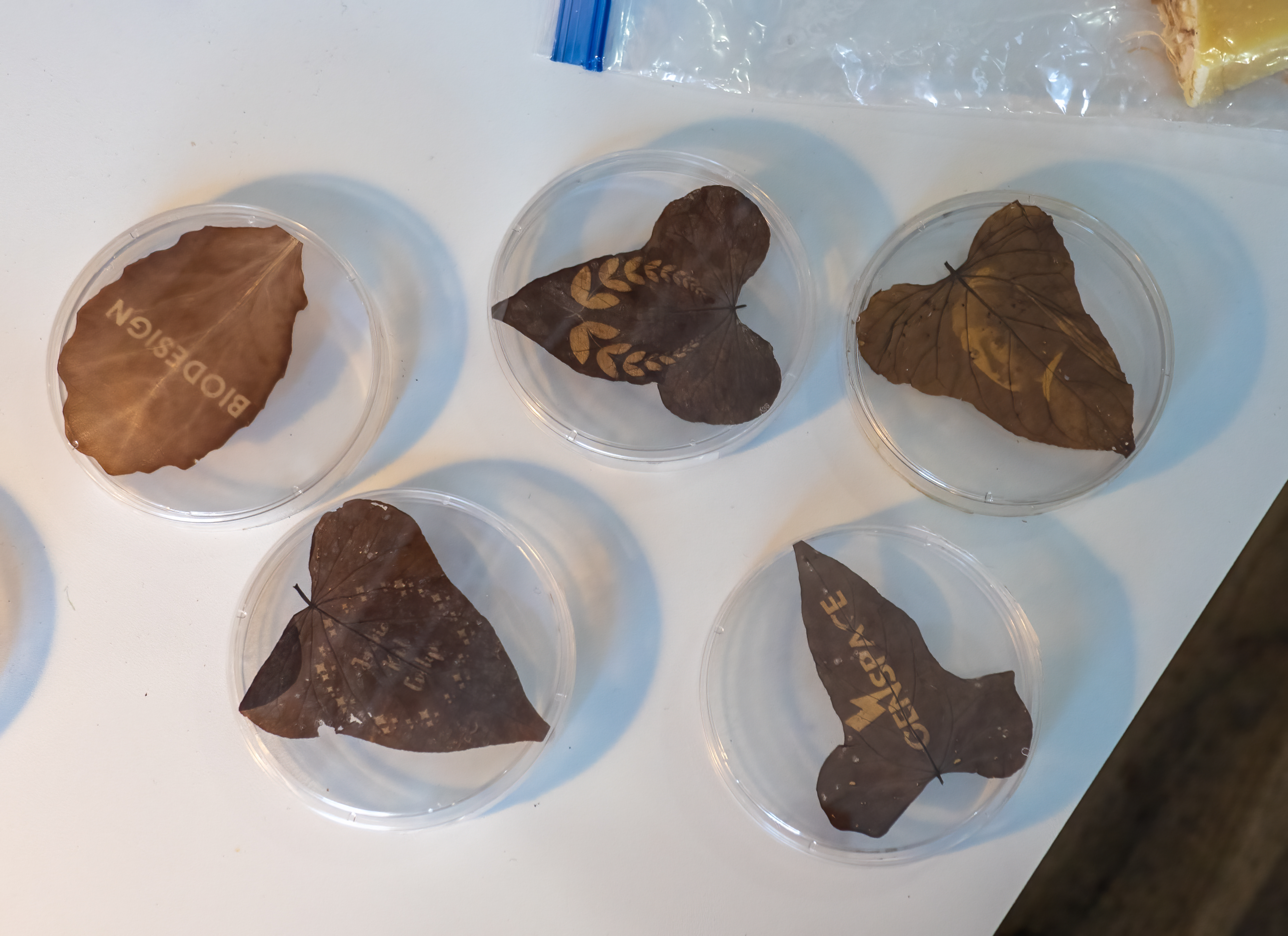
Leaves which have images printed on them

== See also ==
- List of Biomakerspaces in the United States
