= Omni Commons =

Hackerspace and community laboratory in San Francisco

Coordinates: 37.835°N 122.2642°W

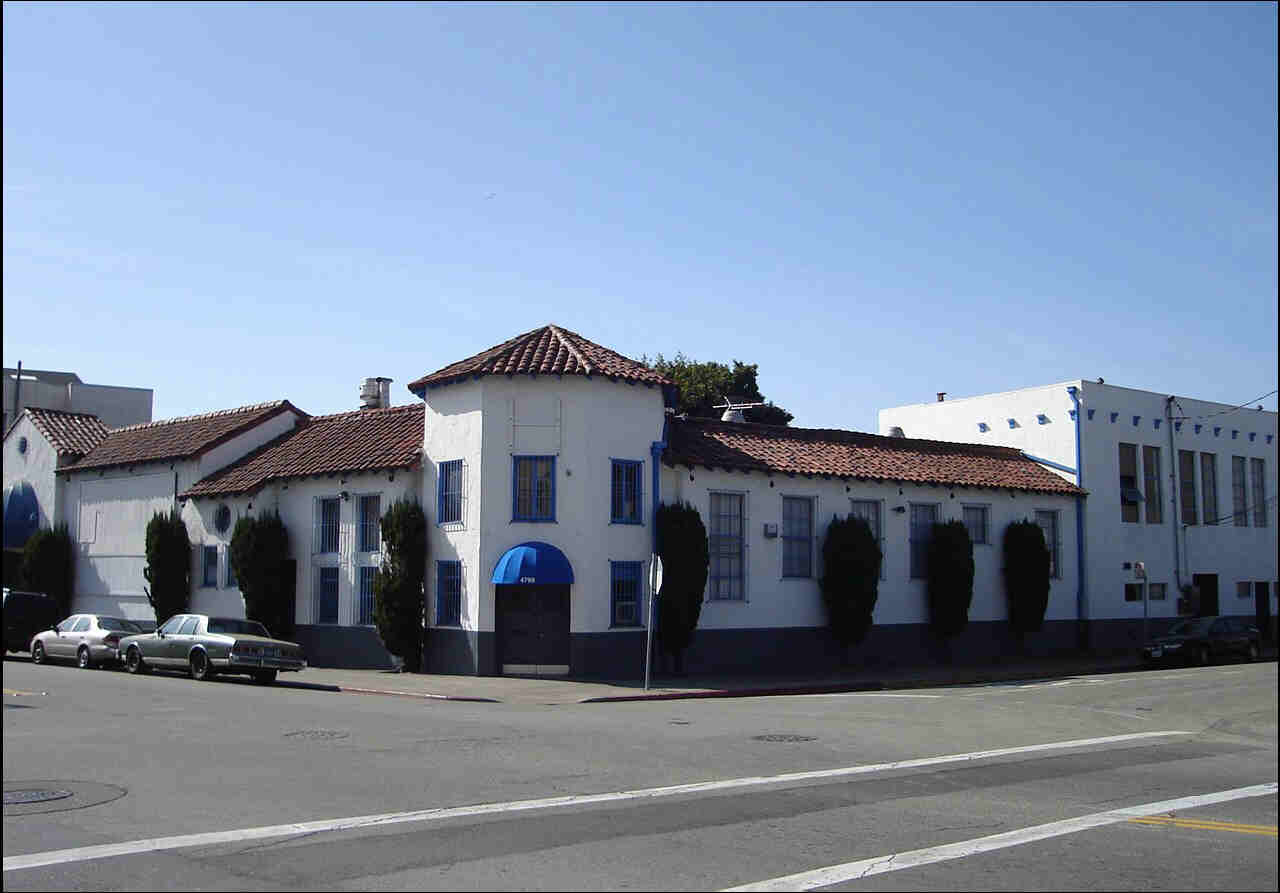
- Formation: July 1, 2014; 11 years ago
- Website: https://omnicommons.org/

The Omni Commons is a group of nine collectives in San Francisco's Bay Area devoted to DIY and community education. It traces its inception to the Occupy movement, specifically Occupy Oakland, and was founded in 2014 on the principles of "community, positive creation and radical inclusion".

== Building ==
Constructed in 1933, the building at 4799 Shattuck Ave in Oakland was conceived as the meeting hall for The Ligure Club, the Italian garbagemen's social club. The 22,000 sq. ft. building hosts a 4,000 sq. ft. ballroom, a large foyer, a Disco room with formerly-illuminated floors, a children's play room, a large industrial kitchen under renovation, and many more spaces of varying sizes.

== Collectives ==
The Commons currently consist of 9 member collectives ranging from activist groups to hackerspaces, each of which have a representative in the Omni Commons' Delegates Council, the decision-making body of the group. Collectives include:

=== Counter Culture Labs ===
A biohacker and citizen science lab in Oakland’s Temescal neighborhood, Counter Culture Labs serves as a community laboratory and hackerspace for people of any skill level.

Open Insulin is one of the projects housed at Counter Culture Labs. It was started in 2015 by Anthony Di Franco, himself a diabetic.

=== Sudo Room ===
An open-membership hackerspace in Oakland with an emphasis on community outreach and service. Active projects hosted by Sudo Room include a weekly hardware hack night, regular programming hangouts, and People's Open Network, a community wireless network being developed by Sudo Mesh, in the San Francisco Bay Area.

== See also ==
- Double Union
- Noisebridge
- List of Biomakerspaces in the United States
