= Nightscout =

Continuous glucose monitor software project

Nightscout CGM Remote Monitor
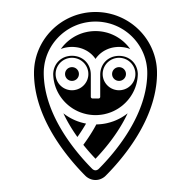
- Release: 2014; 12 years ago
- Stable release: 15.0.2 / 28 November 2024; 20 months ago
- Operating system: Linux, Unix-like
- Available in: JavaScript
- Type: Medical software
- License: Affero General Public License Version 3
- Website: www.nightscout.info
- Repository: github.com/nightscout

Nightscout is a free and open-source project, and associated social movement, that enables accessing and working with continuous glucose monitor (CGM) data. Nightscout software aims to give users access to their real time blood sugar data by putting this data in the cloud. In addition to browser-based data visualization, Nightscout can also be used to review data from a phone or smartwatch, or to remotely monitor CGM data for individuals with type 1 diabetes. Associated with Nightscout software is a broader "CGM in the Cloud" social movement, supporting individuals seeking to access and use realtime CGM data through commercial and DIY ("do it yourself") approaches.

== History ==
The Nightscout Project traces its origin to February 2013, when the parents of a 4-year-old boy newly diagnosed with type 1 diabetes began using a continuous glucose monitoring system. This data was inaccessible to the parents when the child was at school – there was no commercially available way to access the data in real time. The boy's father, John Costik, a software engineer, developed software to access and transfer CGM data to cloud computing infrastructure. Costik shared his accomplishment on Twitter and, after others expressed interest, privately shared the source code.

Costik's uploader was expanded by Lane Desborough and Ross Naylor, to develop "Nightscout": adding a blood glucose chart display that could be viewed throughout a home. Further development to make the software accessible to the general public occurred within a private community of developers, including Ben West, Ross Naylor, Kevin Lee, Jason Calabrese, Jason Adams, and Toby Canning. Because this software was, in effect, an unlicensed medical device, the community delayed releasing the code as open source to explore and address legal concerns. Once this was done, the combined code was released in 2014 as the Nightscout Project.

A website, Facebook group, and Gitter channel were also created to support new users. The primary Facebook group for the movement is "CGM in the Cloud", broadly supporting individuals seeking to use realtime CGM data, via commercial and/or DIY methods. As of February 2026, this group has over 39,000 members. In addition, the related 501(c)(3) organization Nightscout Foundation was formed in 2014 to encourage and support open source technology projects for individuals with type 1 diabetes.

The #WeAreNotWaiting hashtag used by the group was initially coined by Lane Desborough and Howard Look, in reference to a growing call for a "diabetes data exchange" hosted by Tidepool and DiabetesMine in November 2013.

A survey of the Nightscout community indicated that the software was most highly used by parents of young children with type 1 diabetes (less than 12 years of age), but is also used by adolescents and adults.

== Regulatory concerns ==
Because Nightscout software displays information relevant to medical care, there are safety concerns regarding reliability, liability, and regulation. The United States Food and Drug Administration (FDA) expressed concern that a singular entity was needed to review code, monitor safety, and respond to issues. As of 2016, no such entity had arisen, beyond the unstructured approach of community communication channels (e.g. Facebook group and Gitter channel).

As a non-commercial open source project, Nightscout software has not been regulated by the FDA. The software is released with a strong disclaimer:

Highly experimental. Not intended for therapy. Use at your own risk. Intended only as an investigational and educational tool to learn about this technology.

On November 20, 2020, Medical Data Networks LLC (Ben West, CEO) met with and formally petitioned the FDA for clearance of the service product “T1Pal.” T1Pal is a hosted Nightscout platform that runs copies of the latest Nightscout software on its servers for individual subscribers. T1Pal charges a monthly fee to do this ($12.00/mo.).

Medical Data Networks LLC has asserted with the FDA that its implementation of T1Pal meets all of the stated FDA requirements for code review, safety monitoring, and responding to issues. To support this view, a complete copy of the “Quality Management System” currently used by Medical Data Networks LLC was provided to the FDA.

The FDA generally viewed each operating instance of Nightscout as a medical device subject to labeling, hazard management, and FDA reporting requirements. Medical Data Networks LLC asserts that its product T1Pal meets all of the FDA criteria for a "Class 2" medical device, and embraced needed FDA oversight and data reporting requirements.

== Commercial alternatives ==
In 2015, subsequent to the development of the Nightscout Project, Dexcom released a CGM system that included 'Share', providing software for transferring data to cell phones via Bluetooth, and sharing CGM data with others via cell phone apps.

In 2017, the Spanish company Instead Technologies launched a continuous reading system named GlucoAngel for the FreeStyle Libre flash glucose monitor.

== Related projects ==
The OpenAPS project has extended Nightscout to create a do-it-yourself "artificial pancreas", by automating basal insulin delivery by an insulin pump to create a "closed loop" system.
