= OpenAPS =

- Original author(s): Dana Lewis, Scott Leibrand, Ben West
- Initial release: 2015; 10 years ago
- Stable release: 0.7.0 / 10 November 2019; 5 years ago
- Preview release: 0.7.1 / 13 May 2019; 6 years ago
- Repository: github.com/openaps
- Operating system: Cross platform
- Available in: JavaScript, Python
- Type: Medical software
- License: MIT License
- Website: www.openaps.org

The Open Artificial Pancreas System (OpenAPS) project is a free and open-source project that aims to make basic artificial pancreas system (APS) technology available to everyone. The OpenAPS project was designed with the idea of quickly getting the APS technology to more people using a direct approach, rather than waiting for clinical trials to be completed and regulatory approval to be granted.

== History ==
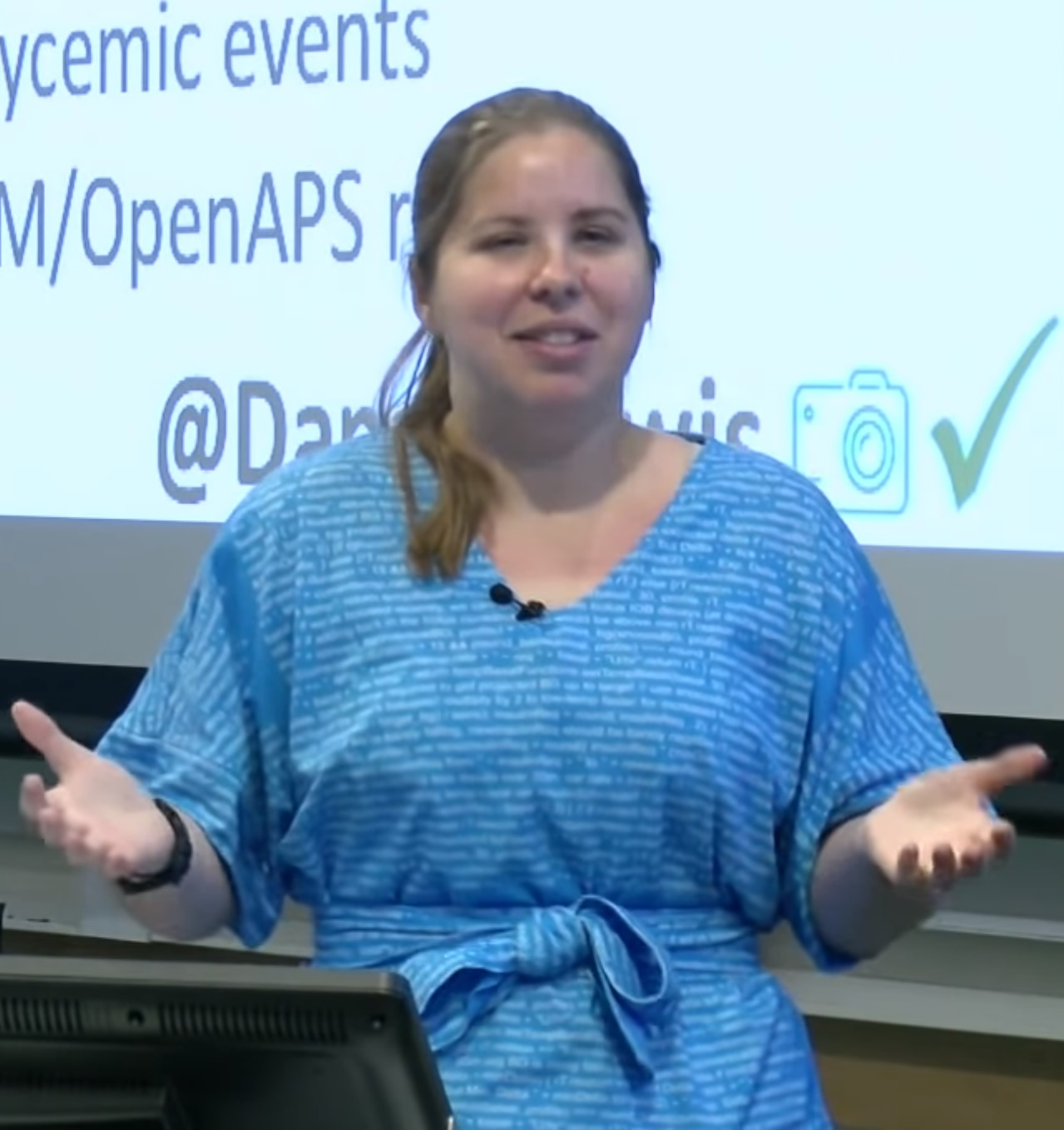
Dana Lewis at linux.conf.au in 2019

OpenAPS traces its origin to 2013, when Dana M. Lewis and Scott Leibrand became aware of privately shared software created by John Costik. This software (which also led to development of the Nightscout project) enabled access and transfer of continuous glucose monitor (CGM) data to cloud computing infrastructure. Lewis, a Type 1 Diabetes patient, was dissatisfied with her commercial device: the device's alarm for hypoglycemic status (which can be life-threatening, if untreated) was too quiet to wake Dana up while sleeping. To address this, Lewis and Leibrand extended the CGM-in-the-cloud software to create a custom high volume alarm. After this initial project, they then used the same CGM-in-the-cloud software to create the Do-It-Yourself Pancreas System (DIYPS) software, which provided a decision assist system for insulin delivery.

This decision automation was able to become a "closed loop" with the help of an open source decoding-carelink project created by Ben West to communicate with Medtronic insulin pumps, enabling data retrieval and issuance of insulin-dosing commands to pumps that support it. With this update, the DIYPS system became "OpenAPS".

Lewis has since presented the OpenAPS at conferences, and has been profiled in various news articles.

== Software ==
The OpenAPS software can run on a small computer such as a Raspberry Pi or Intel Edison and automates an insulin pump's insulin delivery to keep blood glucose in a target range. It does this by monitoring CGM data, algorithmically determining when insulin doses should occur, and issuing commands to the insulin pump to deliver these doses. OpenAPS is a subset of a broader "CGM in the Cloud" social movement; this includes the Nightscout project, which allows CGM users access to their blood sugar data in real time by putting the data in the cloud. As of July 2022 the OpenAPS project knew of over 2,720 people worldwide with various types of DIY closed loop implementations, for over 62 million real-world testing hours.

== Regulatory concerns ==
As with the Nightscout project more generally and as a non-commercial open source project, OpenAPS has not been subject to regulation; this has raised some regulatory concerns, particularly since each user builds their own implementation of the system.

This has also raised some ethical concerns by regulators and researchers. The OpenAPS project emphasizes a "use at your own risk" approach, with the following disclaimer:

[T]he ultimate answer to "is it safe" will be something each individual decides for themselves.

== Commercial alternatives ==
In September 2016, subsequent to the development of OpenAPS, the US FDA released its first approval for an automated insulin delivery device for type 1 diabetes, for Medtronic's MiniMed 670G hybrid closed-loop system.

== See also ==
- Open Insulin Project, an open source biohacking project aiming to produce medical-grade insulin
- List of open-source health software
