= Glucose meter =

Device for measuring blood glucose concentration

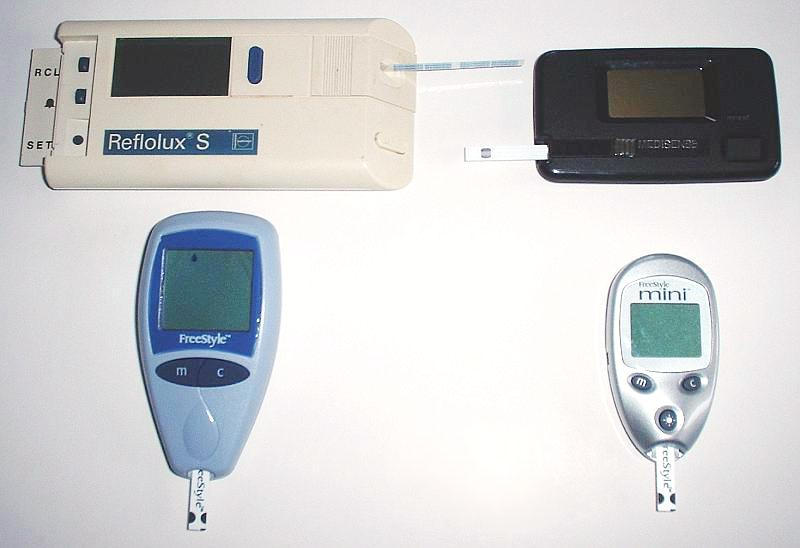
- Four generations of blood glucose meter, c. 1993–2005. Sample sizes vary from 30 to 0.3 μl. Test times vary from 5 seconds to 2 minutes (modern meters typically provide results in 5 seconds).
- Purpose: Measure concentration of glucose in the blood

A glucose meter, also referred to as a "glucometer", is a medical device for determining the approximate concentration of glucose in the blood. It can also be a strip of glucose paper dipped into a substance and measured to the glucose chart. It is a key element of glucose testing, including home blood glucose monitoring (HBGM) performed by people with diabetes mellitus or hypoglycemia. A small drop of blood, obtained from slightly piercing a fingertip with a lancet, is placed on a disposable test strip that the meter reads and uses to calculate the blood glucose level. The meter then displays the level in units of mg/dL or mmol/L.

Since approximately 1980, a primary goal of the management of type 1 diabetes and type 2 diabetes mellitus has been achieving closer-to-normal levels of glucose in the blood for as much of the time as possible, guided by HBGM several times a day. The benefits include a reduction in the occurrence rate and severity of long-term complications from hyperglycemia as well as a reduction in the short-term, potentially life-threatening complications of hypoglycemia.

== History ==
Leland Clark presented his first paper about the oxygen electrode, later named the Clark electrode, on 15 April 1956, at a meeting of the American Society for Artificial Organs during the annual meetings of the Federated Societies for Experimental Biology. In 1962, Clark and Ann Lyons from the Cincinnati Children's Hospital developed the first glucose enzyme electrode. This biosensor was based on a thin layer of glucose oxidase (GOx) on an oxygen electrode. Thus, the readout was the amount of oxygen consumed by GOx during the enzymatic reaction with the substrate glucose. This publication became one of the most often cited papers in life sciences. Due to this work he is considered the “father of biosensors,” especially with respect to the glucose sensing for diabetes patients.

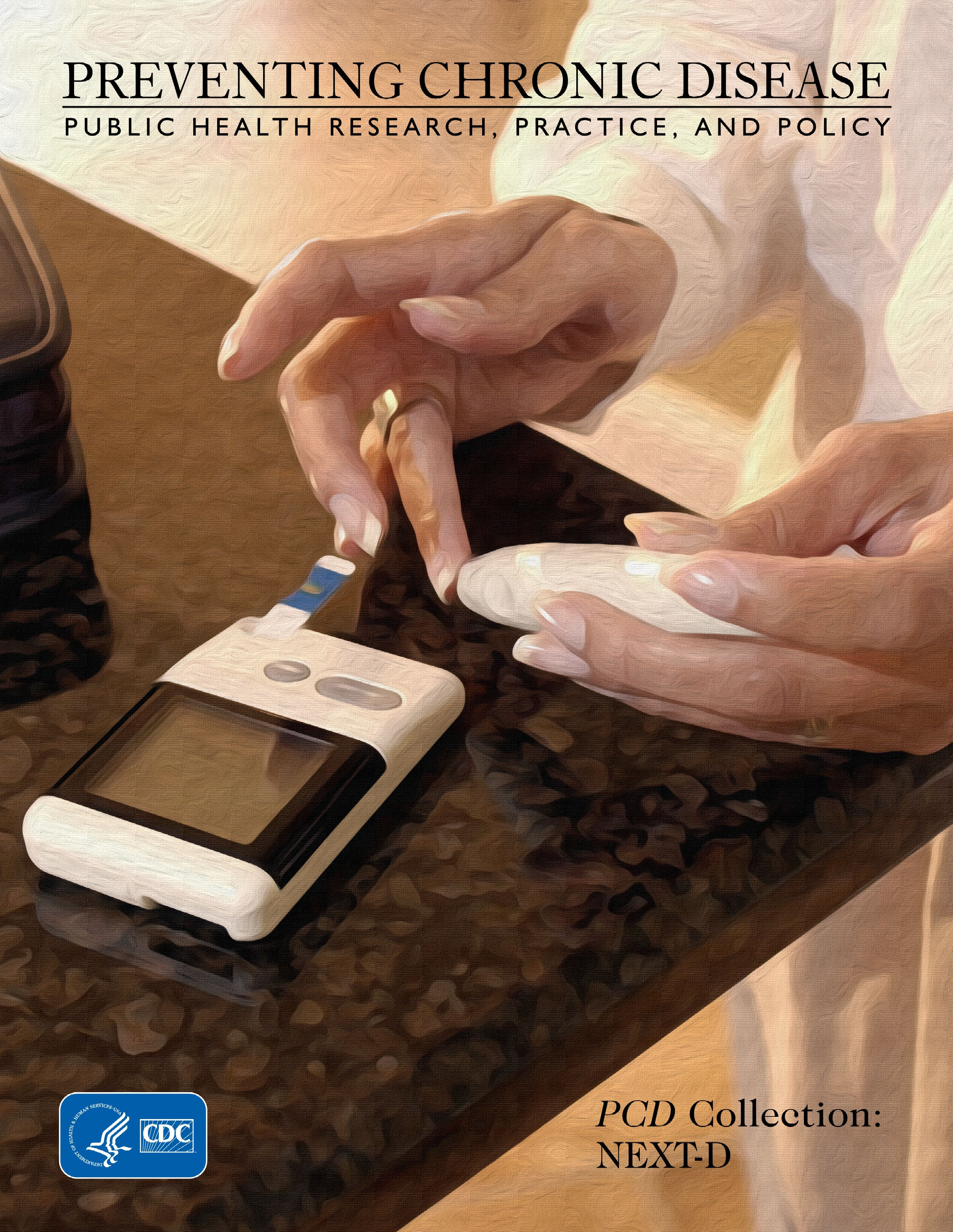
CDC image showing the usage of a lancet and a blood glucose meter

Another early glucose meter was the Ames Reflectance Meter by Anton H. Clemens. It was used in American hospitals in the 1970s. A moving needle indicated the blood glucose after about a minute.

Home glucose monitoring was demonstrated to improve glycemic control of type 1 diabetes in the late 1970s, and the first meters were marketed for home use around 1981. The two models initially dominant in North America in the 1980s were the Glucometer, introduced in November 1981, whose trademark is owned by Ascensia Diabetes Care Holdings AG (part of Panasonic Holdings Corporation, now PHC Holdings Corporation), and the Accu-Chek meter (by Roche). Consequently, these brand names have become synonymous with the generic product to many health care professionals. In Britain, a health care professional or a patient may refer to "taking a BM": "Mrs X's BM is 5", etc. BM stands for Boehringer Mannheim, now part of Roche, who produce test strips called 'BM-test' for use in a meter.

In North America, hospitals resisted adoption of meter glucose measurements for inpatient diabetes care for over a decade. Managers of laboratories argued that the superior accuracy of a laboratory glucose measurement outweighed the advantage of immediate availability and made meter glucose measurements unacceptable for inpatient diabetes management. Patients with diabetes and their endocrinologists eventually persuaded acceptance. Prior to its discontinuation in July 2021, the YSI 2300 STAT PLUS Glucose and Lactate Analyzer was widely accepted as the de facto standard for reference measurements and system calibration by most manufacturers of glucometers for the past 30 years, despite there being no such regulatory requirement.

Home glucose testing was adopted for type 2 diabetes more slowly than for type 1, and a large proportion of people with type 2 diabetes have never been instructed in home glucose testing. This has mainly come about because health authorities are reluctant to bear the cost of the test strips and lancets.

=== Non-meter test strips ===
Test strips that changed color and could be read visually, without a meter, have been widely used since the 1980s. They had the added advantage that they could be cut longitudinally to save money. Critics argued that test strips read by eye are not as accurate or convenient as meter testing. The manufacturer cited studies that show the product is just as effective despite not giving an answer to one decimal place, something they argue is unnecessary for control of blood sugar. This debate also happened in Germany where "Glucoflex-R" was an established strip for type 2 diabetes. As meter accuracy and insurance coverage improved, they lost popularity.

"Glucoflex-R" is Australia manufacturer National Diagnostic Products alternative to the BM test strip. It has versions that can be used either in a meter or read visually. It is also marketed under the brand name Betachek. On May 1, 2009, the UK distributor Ambe Medical Group reduced the price of their "Glucoflex-R" test strip to the NHS, by approximately 50%.

== Types of meters ==
=== Hospital glucose meters ===
Special glucose meters for multi-patient hospital use are now used. These provide more elaborate quality control records. Their data handling capabilities are designed to transfer glucose results into electronic medical records and the laboratory computer systems for billing purposes.

=== Test strip meters ===
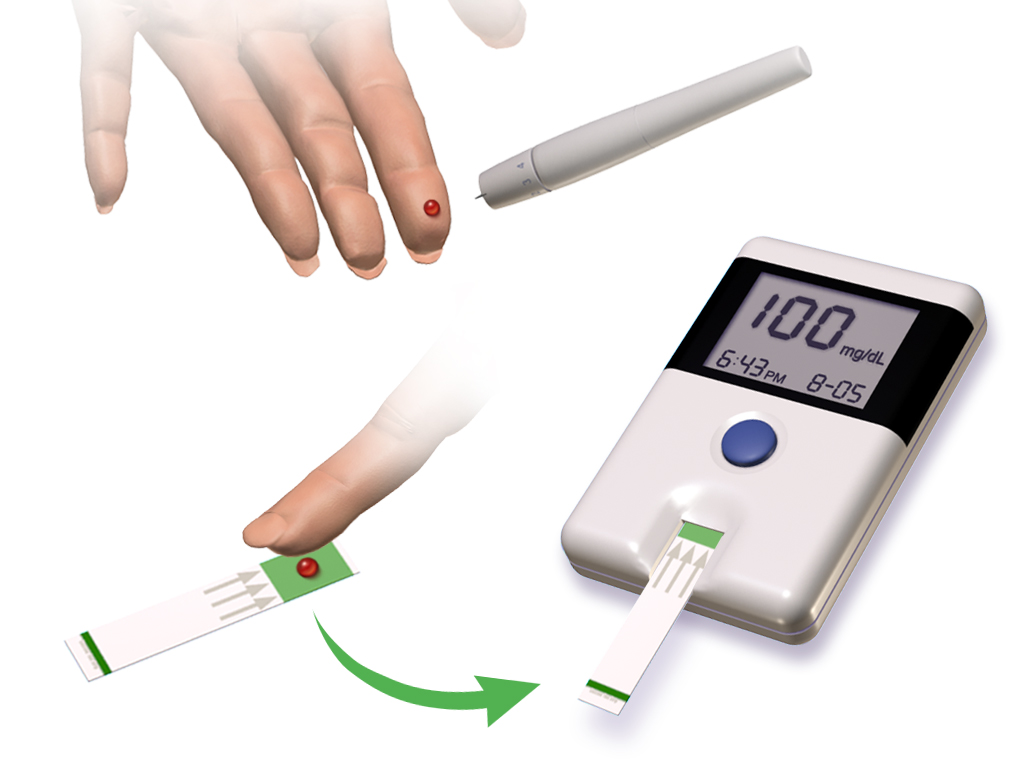
Glucose monitoring with glucometer

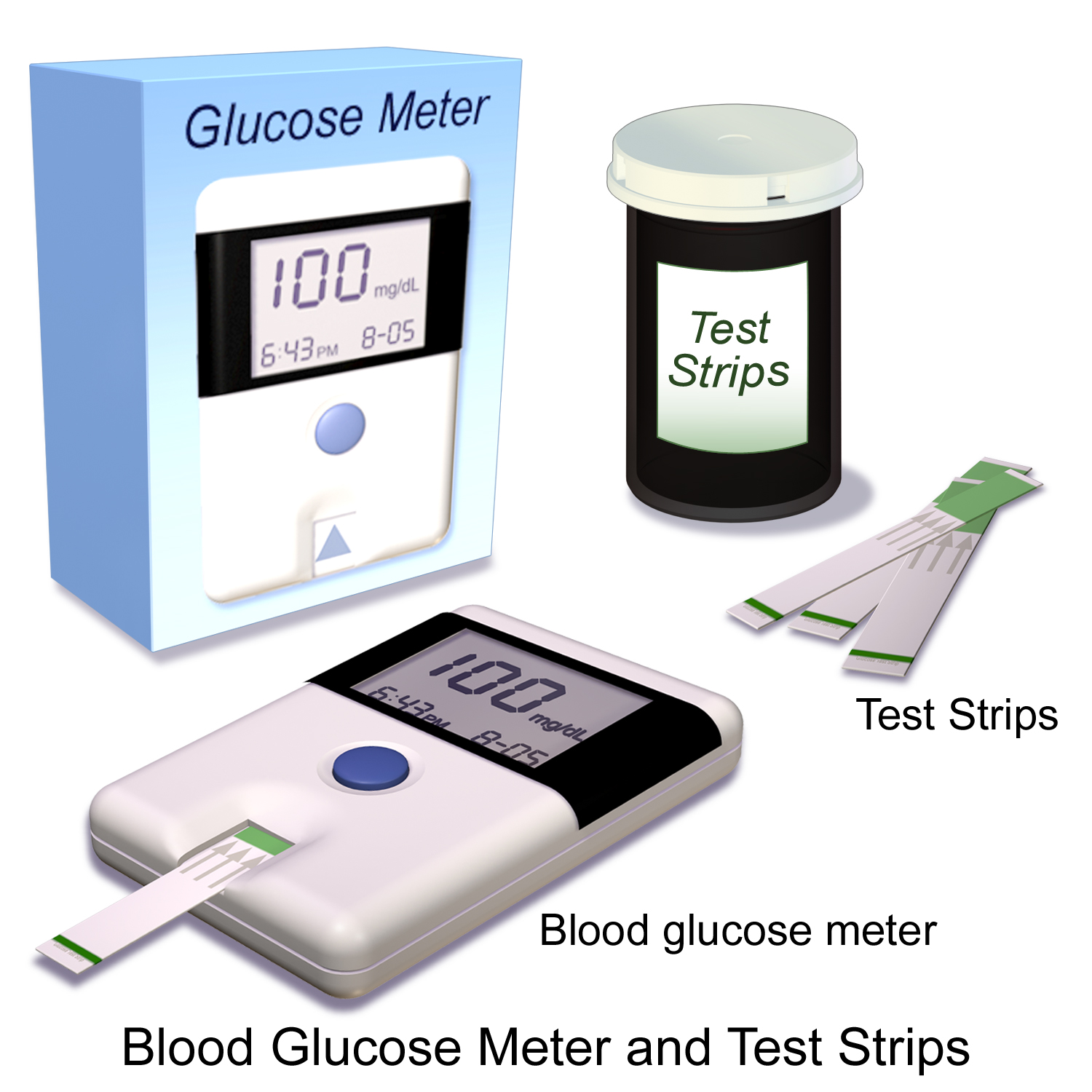
Glucose meter and test strips

There are several key characteristics of glucose meters which may differ from model to model:

- Size: The typical size is smaller than the palm of the hand. They are battery-powered.
- Test strips: A consumable element, different for each meter, containing spots impregnated with glucose oxidase, which reacts with glucose, and other components. A drop of blood is absorbed by a spot for each measurement. Some models use single-use plastic test strips with a spot; other models use discs, drums, or cartridges with multiple spots to make several readings.

- Coding: Since test strips may vary from batch to batch, some models require a code to be provided, either by the user or on a plug-in chip supplied with each batch of test strips, to calibrate the meter to the strips of the batch. An incorrect code can cause errors of up to 4 mmol/L (72 mg/dL), with possibly serious consequences, including risk of hypoglycemia. Some test media contain the code information in the strip.

- Volume of blood sample: The size of the drop of blood needed by different models varies from 0.3 to 1 μl. Older models required larger blood samples, usually defined as a "hanging drop" from the fingertip. Smaller volume requirements reduce the frequency of pricks that do not produce enough blood.
- Alternate site testing: Smaller drop volumes have enabled "alternate site testing" – pricking the forearms or other less sensitive areas instead of the fingertips. Manufacturers recommend that this type of testing should only be used when blood glucose levels are stable, such as before meals, when fasting, or just before going to sleep.
- Duration of test: The time it takes for a reading to be displayed may range from 3 to 60 seconds from application of blood for different models.
- Display: The glucose value in mg/dL or mmol/L (1 mmol/L = 18.0 mg/dL) is displayed on a digital display. Different countries use different measurement units: for example mg/dL are used in the US, France, Japan, Iran, Israel, and India; mmol/L are used in Australia, Canada, China, and the UK. In Germany both units are used. Many meters can display either unit of measure. Instances have been published in which a patient has interpreted a reading in mmol/L as a very low reading in mg/dL or vice versa. Usually mmol/L readings have a decimal point and mg/dL readings do not.
  Countries that use mmol/L include Australia, Canada, China, Croatia, Czech Republic, Denmark, Finland, Hong Kong, Hungary, Iceland, Ireland, Jamaica, Kazakhstan, Latvia, Lithuania, Malaysia, Malta, Netherlands, New Zealand, Norway, Russia, Slovakia, Slovenia, South Africa, Sweden, Switzerland, and United Kingdom.
  Countries that use mg/dL include Algeria, Argentina, Austria, Bangladesh, Belgium, Brazil, Chile, Columbia, Cyprus, Ecuador, Egypt, France, Georgia, Germany, Greece, India, Indonesia, Iran, Israel, Italy, Japan, Jordan, Korea, Lebanon, Mexico, Peru, Poland, Portugal, South Korea, Spain, Syria, Taiwan, Thailand, Tunisia, Turkey, United Arab Emirates, United States, Uruguay, Venezuela, and Yemen.

- Glucose vs. plasma glucose: Glucose levels in plasma (one of the components of blood) are higher than glucose measurements in whole blood; the difference is about 11% when the hematocrit is normal. This is important because home blood glucose meters measure the glucose in whole blood while most lab tests measure the glucose in plasma. Currently, there are many meters on the market that give results as "plasma equivalent," even though they are measuring whole blood glucose. The plasma equivalent is calculated from the whole blood glucose reading using an equation built into the glucose meter. This allows patients to easily compare their glucose measurements in a lab test and at home. It is important for patients and their health care providers to know whether the meter gives its results as "whole blood equivalent" or "plasma equivalent." One model measures beta-hydroxybutyrate in the blood to detect ketosis for measuring both unhealthy ketoacidosis and healthy nutritional ketosis.

- Memory and timestamping: Most meters include a memory to store test results, timestamped by a clock set by the user, and many can display an average of recent readings. Stored data will only reflect trends accurately if the clock is set to approximately the right time.

- Data transfer: Some meters can transfer stored data, typically to a computer or mobile phone running diabetes management software. Meters have been combined with devices such as insulin injection devices, PDAs, and cellular transmitters.

==== Cost ====
The cost of home blood glucose monitoring can be substantial due to the cost of the test strips. In 2006, the US cost to consumers of each glucose strip ranged from about US$0.35 to $1.00. Manufacturers often provide meters at no cost to encourage use of the profitable test strips. Type 1 diabetics may test as often as 4 to 10 times a day due to the dynamics of insulin adjustment, whereas type 2 typically test less frequently, especially when insulin is not part of treatment. In the UK, where the National Health Service (NHS) rather than patients pay for medications including test strips, a 2015 study on the comparative cost-effectiveness of all options for the self-monitoring of blood glucose funded by the NHS uncovered considerable variation in the price charged, which could not be explained by the availability of advanced meter features. It estimated that a total of £12m was invested in providing 42 million self-monitoring blood glucose tests with systems that failed to meet acceptable accuracy standards, and efficiency savings of £23.2m per annum were achievable if the NHS were to disinvest from technologies providing less functionality than available alternatives, but at a much higher price.

Batches of counterfeit test strips for some meters were found in the United States, producing erratic test results that do not meet the legitimate manufacturer's performance specifications.

=== Noninvasive meters ===
The search for a successful technique began about 1975 and has continued to the present without a clinically or commercially viable product. As of 1999, only one such product had ever been approved for sale by the FDA, based on a technique for electrically pulling glucose through intact skin, and it was withdrawn after a short time owing to poor performance and occasional damage to the skin of users.

=== Continuous glucose monitors ===
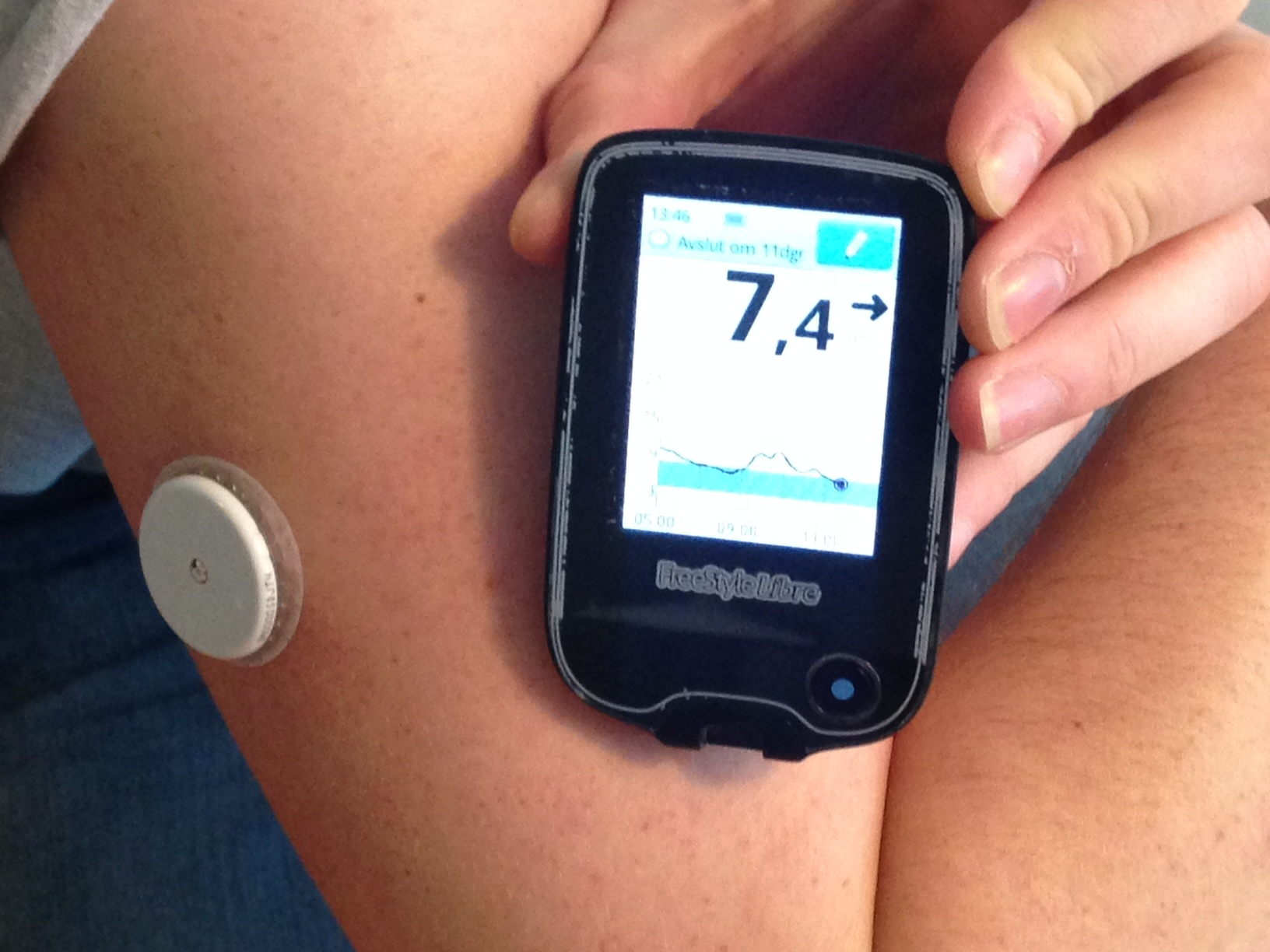
Continuous glucose monitor. The sensor and transmitter are fixed to the upper arm. The reader shows days to replacement of sensor, current blood glucose level and a diagram of the latest blood glucose levels.

Continuous glucose monitor systems can consist of a disposable sensor placed under the skin, a transmitter connected to the sensor and a reader that receives and displays the measurements. The sensor can be used for several days before it needs to be replaced. The devices provide real-time measurements, and reduce the need for fingerprick testing of glucose levels. A drawback is that the meters are not as accurate because they read the glucose levels in the interstitial fluid which lags behind the levels in the blood. Continuous blood glucose monitoring systems are also relatively expensive.

== Accuracy ==
Accuracy of glucose meters is a common topic of clinical concern. Blood glucose meters must meet accuracy standards set by the International Organization for Standardization (ISO). According to ISO 15197 Blood glucose meters must provide results that are within ±15% of a laboratory standard for concentrations above 100 mg/dL or within ±15 mg/dL for concentrations below 100 mg/dL at least 95% of the time. However, a variety of factors can affect the accuracy of a test. Factors affecting accuracy of various meters include calibration of meter, ambient temperature, pressure use to wipe off strip (if applicable), size and quality of blood sample, high levels of certain substances (such as ascorbic acid) in blood, hematocrit, dirt on meter, humidity, and aging of test strips. Models vary in their susceptibility to these factors and in their ability to prevent or warn of inaccurate results with error messages. The Clarke Error Grid has been a common way of analyzing and displaying accuracy of readings related to management consequences. More recently an improved version of the Clarke Error Grid has come into use: It is known as the Consensus Error Grid. Older blood glucose meters often need to be "coded" with the lot of test strips used, otherwise, the accuracy of the blood glucose meter may be compromised due to lack of calibration.

== Future ==
One noninvasive glucose meter has been approved by the U.S. FDA: The GlucoWatch G2 Biographer made by Cygnus Inc. The device was designed to be worn on the wrist and used electric fields to draw out body fluid for testing. The device did not replace conventional blood glucose monitoring. One limitation was that the GlucoWatch was not able to cope with perspiration at the measurement site. Sweat must be allowed to dry before measurement can resume. Due to this limitation and others, the product is no longer on the market.

The market introduction of noninvasive blood glucose measurement by spectroscopic measurement methods, in the field of near-infrared (NIR), by extracorporal measuring devices, has not been successful because the devices measure tissue sugar in body tissues and not the blood sugar in blood fluid. To determine blood glucose, the measuring beam of infrared light, for example, has to penetrate the tissue for measurement of blood glucose.

There are currently three CGMS (continuous glucose monitoring system) available. The first is Medtronic's Minimed Paradigm RTS with a sub-cutaneous probe attached to a small transmitter (roughly the size of a quarter) that sends interstitial glucose levels to a small pager sized receiver every five minutes. The Dexcom System is another system, available in two different generations in the US, the G4 and the G5. (1Q 2016). It is a hypodermic probe with a small transmitter. The receiver is about the size of a cell phone and can operate up to twenty feet from the transmitter. The Dexcom G4 transmits via radio frequency and requires a dedicated receiver. The G5 version utilizes Bluetooth low energy for data transmission, and can transmit data directly to a compatible cellular telephone. Currently, Apple's iPhone and Android devices can be used as a receiver. Aside from a two-hour calibration period, monitoring is logged at five-minute intervals for up to 1 week. The user can set the high and low glucose alarms. The third CGMS available is the FreeStyle Navigator from Abbott Laboratories.

There is currently an effort to develop an integrated treatment system with a glucose meter, insulin pump, and wristop controller, as well as an effort to integrate the glucose meter and a cell phone. Testing strips are proprietary and available only through the manufacturer (no insurance availability). These "Glugophones" are currently offered in three forms: as a dongle for the iPhone, an add-on pack for LG model UX5000, VX5200, and LX350 cell phones, as well as an add-on pack for the Motorola Razr cell phone. In US, this limits providers to AT&T and Verizon. Similar systems have been tested for a longer time in Finland.

Recent advances in cellular data communications technology have enabled the development of glucose meters that directly integrate cellular data transmission capability, enabling the user to both transmit glucose data to the medical caregiver and receive direct guidance from the caregiver on the screen of the glucose meter. The first such device, from Telcare, Inc., was exhibited at the 2010 CTIA International Wireless Expo, where it won an E-Tech award. This device then underwent clinical testing in the US and internationally.

In early 2014 Google reported testing prototypes of contact lenses that monitor glucose levels and alert users when glucose levels cross certain thresholds. Apple has patented methods for determining blood sugar levels by absorption spectroscopy, as well as by analyzing exhaled air in its electronic devices.

== Technology ==
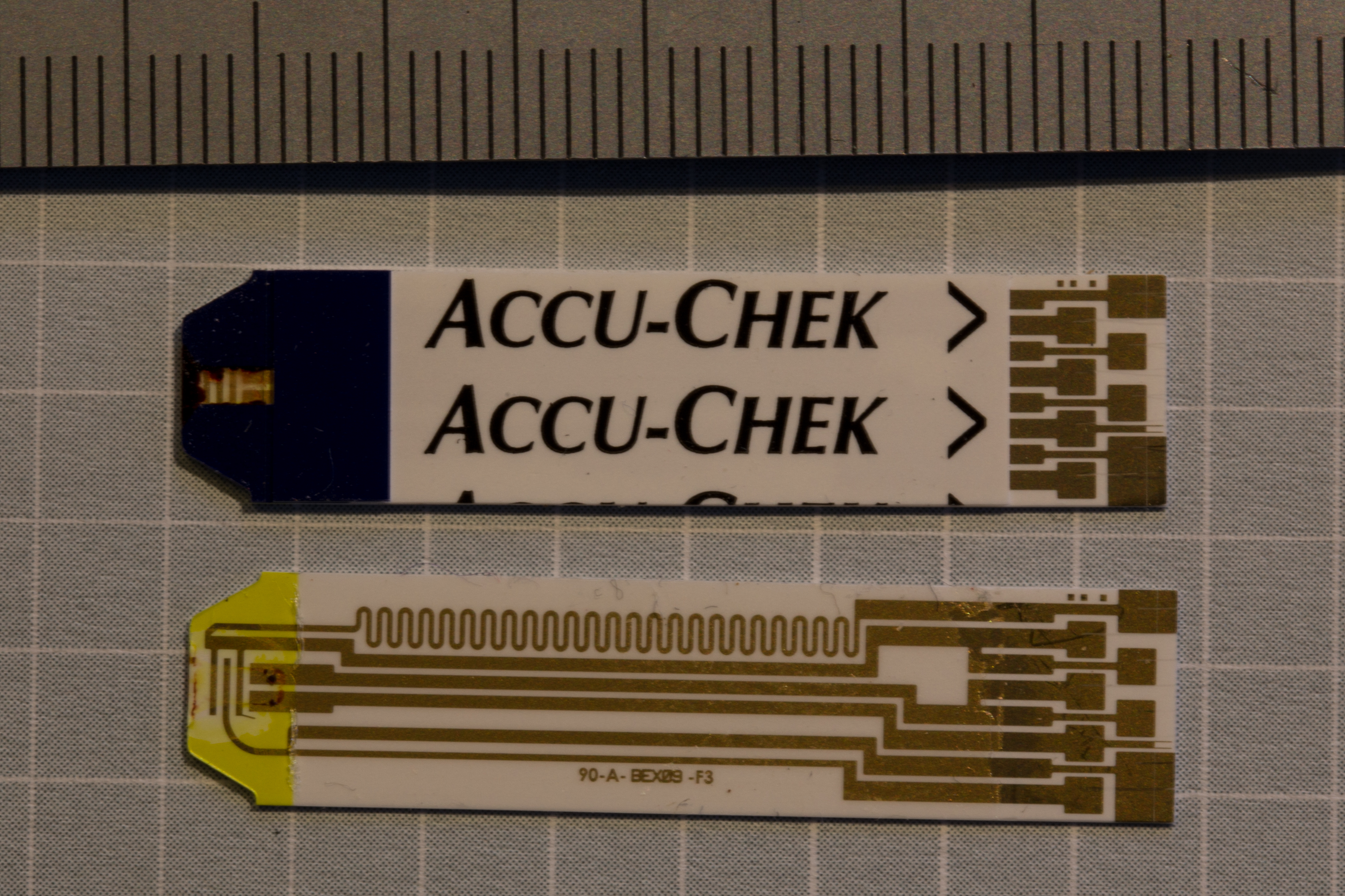
Two used Accu-Chek test strips. The lower one has had the cover peeled off to show the circuit.

Many glucose meters employ the oxidation of glucose to gluconolactone catalyzed by glucose oxidase (sometimes known as GOx), producing hydrogen peroxide as seen in the following reaction:

$Glucose + O_2 \xrightarrow {Glucose Oxidase} Gluconic Acid + H_2O_2$

Others use a similar reaction catalysed instead by another enzyme, glucose dehydrogenase (GDH). This has the advantage of sensitivity over glucose oxidase but is more susceptible to interfering reactions with other substances.

The first-generation devices relied on the same colorimetric reaction that is still used nowadays in glucose test strips for urine. Besides glucose oxidase, the test kit contains a benzidine derivative, which is oxidized to a blue polymer by the hydrogen peroxide formed in the oxidation reaction. The disadvantage of this method was that the test strip had to be developed after a precise interval (the blood had to be washed away), and the meter needed to be calibrated frequently.

Most glucometers today use an electrochemical method. Test strips contain a capillary that sucks up a reproducible amount of blood. The glucose in the blood reacts with an enzyme electrode containing glucose oxidase (or dehydrogenase). The enzyme is reoxidized with an excess of a mediator reagent, such as a ferricyanide ion, a ferrocene derivative or osmium bipyridyl complex. The mediator in turn is reoxidized by reaction at the electrode, which generates an electric current. In order for the mediator to operate over long timeframes, it needs to be stable in both oxidised and reduced states. This is to allow for continuous regeneration of the oxidised form of the mediator for shuttling of electrons from enzyme to active site. Osmium-based polypyridyl redox complexes and polymers are attractive candidates as mediators due to their stability in oxidised and reduced forms, tunable redox potential, ease of co-immobilisation and ability to operate at low potentials.

The total charge passing through the electrode is proportional to the amount of glucose in the blood that has reacted with the enzyme. The coulometric method is a technique where the total amount of charge generated by the glucose oxidation reaction is measured over a period of time. The amperometric method is used by some meters and measures the electric current generated at a specific point in time by the glucose reaction. This is analogous to throwing a ball and using the speed at which it is travelling at a point in time to estimate how hard it was thrown. The coulometric method can allow for variable test times, whereas the test time on a meter using the amperometric method is always fixed. Both methods give an estimation of the concentration of glucose in the initial blood sample.

The same principle is used in test strips that have been commercialized for the detection of diabetic ketoacidosis (DKA). These test strips use a beta-hydroxybutyrate-dehydrogenase enzyme instead of a glucose oxidizing enzyme and have been used to detect and help treat some of the complications that can result from prolonged hyperglycemia.

Blood alcohol sensors using the same approach, but with alcohol dehydrogenase enzymes, have been tried and patented but have not yet been successfully commercially developed.

== Meter use for hypoglycemia ==
Although the apparent value of immediate measurement of blood glucose might seem to be higher for hypoglycemia (low sugar) than hyperglycemia (high sugar), meters have been less useful. The primary problems are precision and ratio of false positive and negative results. An imprecision of ±15% is less of a problem for high glucose levels than low. There is little difference in the management of a glucose of 200 mg/dL compared with 260 (i.e., a "true" glucose of 230±15%), but a ±15% error margin at a low glucose concentration brings greater ambiguity with regards to glucose management.

The imprecision is compounded by the relative likelihoods of false positives and negatives in populations with diabetes and those without. People with type 1 diabetes usually have a wider range of glucose levels, and glucose peaks above normal, often ranging from 40 to 500 mg/dL (2.2 to 28 mmol/L), and when a meter reading of 50 or 70 (2.8 or 3.9 mmol/L) is accompanied by their usual hypoglycemic symptoms, there is little uncertainty about the reading representing a "true positive" and little harm done if it is a "false positive." However, the incidence of hypoglycemia unawareness, hypoglycemia-associated autonomic failure (HAAF) and faulty counterregulatory response to hypoglycemia make the need for greater reliability at low levels particularly urgent in patients with type 1 diabetes mellitus, while this is seldom an issue in the more common form of the disease, type 2 diabetes mellitus.

In contrast, people who do not have diabetes may periodically have hypoglycemic symptoms but may also have a much higher rate of false positives to true, and a meter is not accurate enough to base a diagnosis of hypoglycemia upon. A meter can occasionally be useful in the monitoring of severe types of hypoglycemia (e.g., congenital hyperinsulinism) to ensure that the average glucose when fasting remains above 70 mg/dL (3.9 mmol/L).

== See also ==
- ISO/IEEE 11073
