= Glucose 1-dehydrogenase (disambiguation) =

Glucose 1-dehydrogenase is a type of enzyme.

Glucose 1-dehydrogenase may specifically refer to:

- Glucose 1-dehydrogenase (FAD, quinone)
- Glucose 1-dehydrogenase (NAD+)
- Glucose 1-dehydrogenase (NADP+)
