= Soluble quinoprotein glucose dehydrogenase =

Identifiers
- EC no.: 1.1.99.35

Databases
- IntEnz: IntEnz view
- BRENDA: BRENDA entry
- ExPASy: NiceZyme view
- KEGG: KEGG entry
- MetaCyc: metabolic pathway
- PRIAM: profile
- PDB structures: RCSB PDB PDBe PDBsum
Search
- PMC: articles
- PubMed: articles
- NCBI: proteins

Soluble quinoprotein glucose dehydrogenase (EC 1.1.99.35, soluble glucose dehydrogenase, sGDH, glucose dehydrogenase (PQQ-dependent)) is an enzyme with systematic name D-glucose:acceptor oxidoreductase. This enzyme catalyses the following chemical reaction

D-glucose
+ electron acceptor
glucono-δ-lactone
+ reduced acceptor

This soluble periplasmic enzyme contains PQQ as prosthetic group, and is bound to a calcium ion. The electron acceptor is not known.
