= Penicillium resticulosum =

Scientific classification
- Domain: Eukaryota
- Kingdom: Fungi
- Division: Ascomycota
- Class: Eurotiomycetes
- Order: Eurotiales
- Family: Aspergillaceae
- Genus: Penicillium
- Species: P. resticulosum

Binomial name
- Penicillium resticulosum Birkinshaw, Raistrick & G. Smith 1942

Type strain
- ATCC 10489, CBS 150.45, CBS 609.94, FRR 2021, IFO 7734, IMI 040227, IMI 140227, LSHB P47, MUCL 38789, NBRC 7734, NRRL 2021, P47

Species of fungus

Penicillium resticulosum is an anamorph species of fungus in the genus Penicillium which produces notatin.
