= Ole Kæseler Andersen =

Danish professor

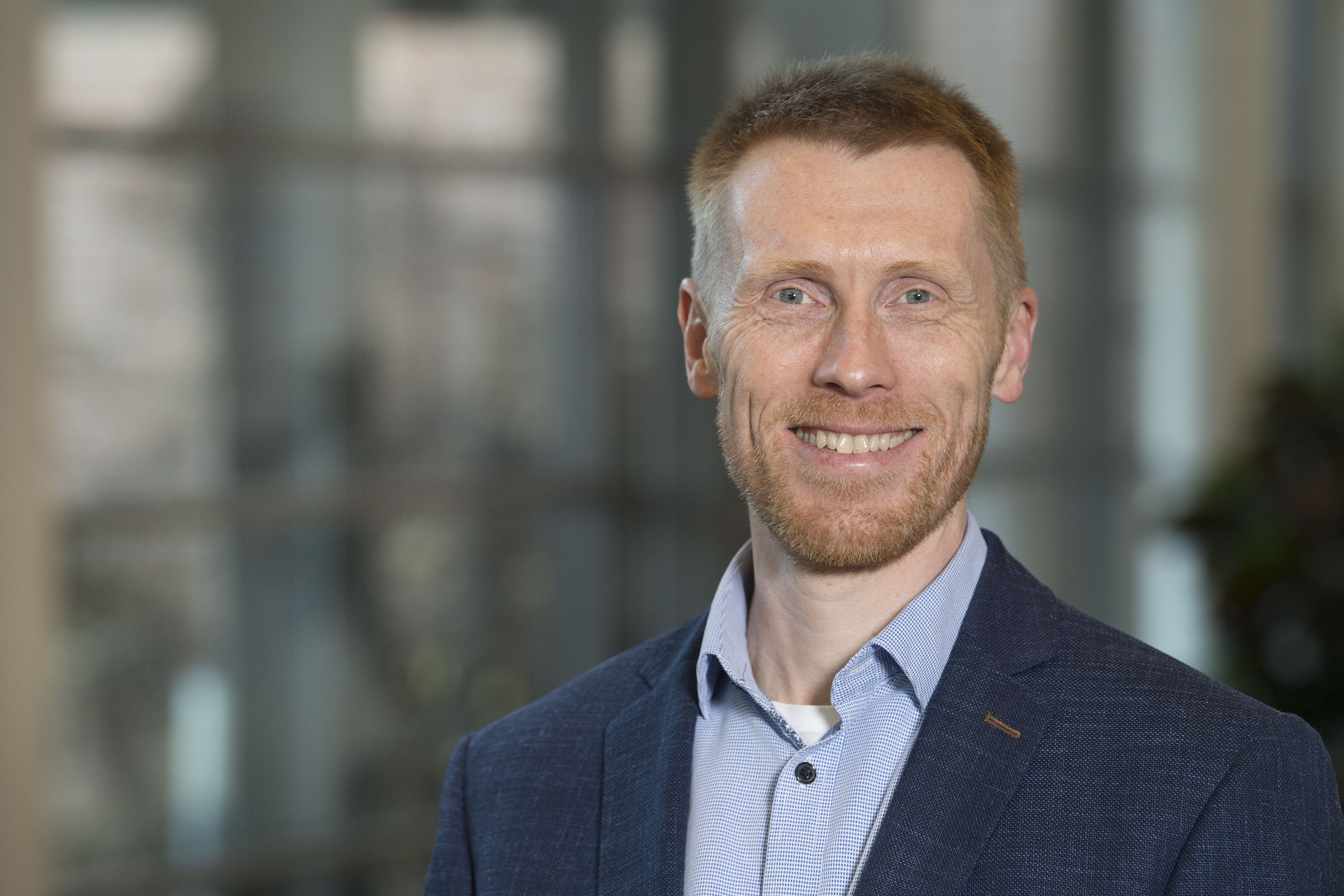
Ole Kæseler Andersen

Ole Kæseler Andersen is a Danish professor at Aalborg University, who conducts research in health technology. In 2010 Andersen, Erika G. Spaich and Jonas Emborg won the Danish Scientific Result of the Year. The prize was awarded for the breakthrough in using electroshocks in order to make it possible for paralysed patients to regain their normal walking capacity.

Andersen was awarded amaster's degree in medical technology from Aalborg University in 1992. In 1996, he was awarded the PhD degree in Biomedical Science and Engineering from Aalborg. On 1 June 2007, Andersen was awarded the Danish higher doctoral degree on the basis of his thesis on the spinal withdrawal reflex.

As a lecturer and as a professor since 2008, Andersen has concentrated his research on the neurobiology of pain, rehabilitation technology, motor control, electro-physiological measurement from the muscles, nerves and brain, and bio-instrumentation.
