= Bioinstrumentation =

Application of biomedical engineering to measurement of biological systems

Bioinstrumentation or biomedical instrumentation is an application of biomedical engineering which focuses on development of devices and mechanics used to measure, evaluate, and treat biological systems. The goal of biomedical instrumentation focuses on the use of multiple sensors to monitor physiological characteristics of a human or animal for diagnostic and disease treatment purposes. Such instrumentation originated as a necessity to constantly monitor vital signs of Astronauts during NASA's Mercury, Gemini, and Apollo missions.

Bioinstrumentation is a new and upcoming field, concentrating on treating diseases and bridging together the engineering and medical worlds. The majority of innovations within the field have occurred in the past 15–20 years, as of 2022. Bioinstrumentation has revolutionized the medical field, and has made treating patients much easier. The instruments/sensors produced by the bioinstrumentation field can convert signals found within the body into electrical signals that can be processed into some form of output. There are many subfields within bioinstrumentation, they include: biomedical options, creation of sensor, genetic testing, and drug delivery. Fields of engineering such as electrical engineering, biomedical engineering, and computer science, are the related sciences to bioinstrumentation.

Bioinstrumentation has since been incorporated into the everyday lives of many individuals, with sensor-augmented smartphones capable of measuring heart rate and oxygen saturation, and the widespread availability of fitness apps, with over 40,000 health tracking apps on iTunes alone. Wrist-worn fitness tracking devices have also gained popularity, with a suite of on-board sensors capable of measuring the user's biometrics, and relaying them to an app that logs and tracks information for improvements.

The model of a generalized instrumentation system necessitates only four parts: a measurand, a sensor, a signal processor, and an output display. More complicated instrumentation devices may also designate function for data storage and transmission, calibration, or control and feedback. However, at its core, an instrumentation systems converts energy or information from a physical property not otherwise perceivable, into an output display that users can easily interpret.

Common examples include:

- Heart rate monitor
- Automated external defibrillator
- Blood oxygen monitor
- Electrocardiography
- Electroencephalography
- Pedometer
- Glucometer
- Sphygmomanometer

The measurand can be classified as any physical property, quantity, or condition that a system might want to measure. There are many types of measurands including biopotential, pressure, flow, impedance, temperature and chemical concentrations. In electrical circuitry, the measurand can be the potential difference across a resistor. In Physics, a common measurand might be velocity. In the medical field, measurands vary from biopotentials and temperature to pressure and chemical concentrations. This is why instrumentation systems make up such a large portion of modern medical devices. They allow physicians up-to-date, accurate information on various bodily processes.

But the measurand is of no use without the correct sensor to recognize that energy and project it. The majority of measurements mentioned above are physical (forces, pressure, etc.), so the goal of a sensor is to take a physical input and create an electrical output. These sensors do not differ, greatly, in concept from sensors we use to track the weather, atmospheric pressure, pH, etc.

Normally, the signals collected by the sensor are too small or muddled by noise to make any sense of. Signal processing simply describes the overarching tools and methods utilized to amplify, filter, average, or convert that electrical signal into something meaningful.

Lastly, the output display shows the results of the measurement process. The display must be legible to human operator. Output displays can be visual, auditory, numerical, or graphical. They can take discrete measurements, or continuously monitor the measurand over a period of time.

Biomedical instrumentation however is not to be confused with medical devices. Medical devices are apparati used for diagnostics, treatment, or prevention of disease and injury. Most of the time these devices affect the structure or function of the body. The easiest way to tell the difference is that biomedical instruments measure, sense, and output data while medical devices do not.

Examples of medical devices:

1. IV tubing
2. Catheters
3. Prosthetics
4. Oxygen masks
5. Bandages

== History ==
Biomedical engineering and bioinstrumentation are new terms, but the practice behind them has existed for many generations. Since the beginning of mankind, humans have used what was available to them to treat the medical mishaps they encountered. Biomedical engineering was most developed in the nineteenth century. In the recent years, biomedical engineering has gained popularity and focused on creating solutions for issues in human physiology. Since then, inventions such as X-rays and stethoscopes have progressed and revolutionized the medical field.

The concept of biomedical engineering was developed after World War II and they even considered it as they make humans work easier as they give exact and Clear detailed reports.The invention of the first artificial heart valve was successfully implanted in 1952, the first artificial kidney was created in the 1940s, and a heart-lung machine was successfully used in a human heart surgery in 1953. These advancements are major milestones within the medical field as it provides life changing procedures. The development of the Positron Emission Tomography (PET) scan was a significant advancement within the biomedical field. the PET scan was invented by Edward Hoffman and Michael E. Phelps in 1974. the machine provides an effective imaging test for understanding the metabolic activity within the tissues and organs of the patient.

=== Space flight ===
Bioinstrumentation was first developed in earnest by NASA during their early space missions, to gain a better understanding of how humans were affected by space travel. These early bioinstrumentation sensor arrays built by NASA constantly monitored astronauts ECG, respiration, and body temperature; and later measured blood pressure. This allowed physicians to monitor the astronauts vital-signs for potential problems. Data taken from Apollo 15 ECG bioinstrumentation showed periods of cardiac arrhythmia, which physicians and planners used to alter expected workload, diet, and the drugs in the on-board medical kits.

== Development Instrumentation Devices ==
A generalized structure for how medical devices should be developed follows from determining a clinical condition of a patient such as diabetes. Then the relevant physiological parameter to be measured would in this case be blood sugar concentrations, but for other situations could be blood pressure, heart rate, white blood cell count, or other signals and amounts in the body. Next, the method in which this physiological parameter is taken must be determined. For someone with type one diabetes, these could be a glucose monitoring system with a sensor placed just below the skin in the interstitial fluid that can measure the concentration of glucose. The next parameter that is chosen for the development of a biomedical instrumentation device would be the transducer design, which for this example would be changing glucose concentration to a measurable value such as voltage via the reaction from glucose and glucose oxidase's products with a reduction reaction causing a current to flow being transformed to a voltage change to be measured. The final step to the development of the device before signal digitization, processing, and display is filter and amplifier design which will clean up and increase the size of the physiological signal so that it is able to be detected and read out on the device.

== Classes ==
Medical devices are divided into three main classes. The first class is the lowest risk group and are medical devices that do not sustain life at all. These include for example bandages, wheelchairs, and tooth brushes. About thirty percent of medical devices fall under this category. Next, is class two with about sixty percent of all medical devices where the medical devices now include moderate risk. These include catheters, X-rays, and blood pressure cuffs. Finally, class three includes the medical devices with the most risk associated with its intended use. Only about ten percent of medical devices fall under this category since special parameters of safety must be shown to the FDA prior to its approval which is much more strict than the previous classes. Class three devices include pacemakers, cochlear implants, and heart valves. Overall, the FDA developed this system of medical devices classes in order to expedite the process of approval. When a medical device is organized into a lower class, and therefore a lower risk, it will be reviewed less stringent and be able to move into the medical field and market much quicker than devices that have high risk and must prove safety to risk benefits.

Classes of biomedical instruments include:

1. Quantity Sensed: pressure, flow, temperature
2. Transduction: resistance, induction, capacitance

=== Electrical Safety and Risk Classification ===
Medical devices are also divided into different electrical safety and risk classifications:

1. Class 1
2. Class 2
3. Class 3
4. Type B applied part
5. Type BF applied part
6. Type CF applied part
7. Defibrillation-proof type CF applied part
8. Conformité Europeénne

Class 1, class 2, and class 3 appliance classifications are defined by the IEC and are used to define how the device is protected against electric shock. Class 1 medical devices include all devices where protection from electric shock is achieved through wire insulation and a protected earth. Class 2 medical devices are classified by the presence of at least two layers of wire insulation - one basic layer insulation and a supplemental insulating layer or one layer of reinforced insulation. For example, cardiac monitors typically are IEC class 2 devices. Class 3 medical devices rely on limiting voltages to no higher than the SELV. This class of device does not require any protection from the input voltage for the user. SELV components must be insulated by two layers of protection from components operating about the SELV. Some examples of IEC class 3 devices are pacemakers and AEDs.

As the device class designation designates the method of electric protection, the type designation of the device denotes the degree of protection against electric shock. This is quantified by the maximum permitted leakage current from the device. Type designations are defined by the IEC 60601 standard. Type B applied parts have a maximum leakage current of 100μA and cannot be directly connected to the heart. Type BF applied parts have the same requirement for maximum leakage current, but differ in the fact that they are an isolated or floating device with conductive contact with the user. These would include a device such as a blood pressure monitor. Type CF applied parts have the most strict requirements and is used for devices that come in direct contact with the heart. The maximum leakage current is 10μA. An example of type CF applied parts is are dialysis machines.

== Components ==
The basic fundamental parts for any biomedical instrument are as following below:

1. Measurand: A physical quantity where the instrumentation systems would measure it. The human body would act as the source for measurand that would generate bio-signals. This would include the body surface or blood pressure in the heart.
2. Sensor/Transducer: This would be where the transducer would convert one form of energy to another form, and this would be usually electrical energy. An example would be the piezoelectric signal that would convert mechanical vibrations into the electrical signal. A usable output depending on the measurand would be produced by the transducer. The source would be used to interface the signal with the human as the sensor would be used to sense the signal from the source.
3. Signal Conditioner: Signal conditioning circuits would be used to convert the output of the transducer into an electrical value. The instrument system would send the quantity to the display or the recording system. The signal conditioning process would include amplification, filtering, analogue to digital and digital to analogue.
4. Display: A visual representation of measured parameter or quantity such as chart recorder and cathode ray oscilloscope (CRO). Alarms could also be used to hear the audio signals such as signals made in Doppler Ultrasound Scanner.
5. Data Storage and Data Transmission: Data storage is meant to record data for future reference and use. An example would be in telemetric systems where data transmission would occurs such that data can be transmitted from one place to another on-demand through the Internet.

== Circuits/creation of sensors ==
Sensors are the most well known aspect of bioinstrumentation. They include thermometers, brain scans, and electrocardiograms. Sensors take in signals from the body, and amplify them so engineers and doctors can study them. Signals from sensors are amplified using circuits, by taking in a voltage source, and modifying them using circuit components such as resistors, capacitors, and inductors. They then let out a certain amount of voltage, which is used for analysis based on some relationship between the voltage being output and the measurand of interest. The data collected using sensors is often displayed on computer programs. This field of bioinstrumentation is closely related to electrical engineering.

Circuits used to measure biological signals such as electrical activity of the heart and brain generally incorporate op-amps as a means of amplifying the relatively minuscule signals for signal processing and data analysis. A commonly used amplifier is the instrumentation amplifier. Instrumentation amplifiers such as the integrated circuit (IC) AD620 amplifier are able to amplify the difference between two different voltage inputs while maintaining little offset voltage and a high CMRR, allowing it to amplify low frequency signals while rejecting noise.

These circuits may also incorporate filters to better account for unwanted noise, as the small scale for biological signals requires a wide range of filtering to account for noise generated by factors such as dc offset, interference from other biological signals, or electrical noise from the equipment being used.

== Current use ==
=== Pacemakers ===
A pacemaker is implanted to monitor the patient's heartbeat and send electrical pulses to regulate it when it is too slow. Electrodes send electrical pulses to the chambers of the heart which allow the heart to contract and pump blood. Pacemakers are for those who have damaged hearts or hearts that are not working properly. The normal electrical conduction of the heart allows impulses that are generated by the SA node to stimulate the cardiac muscle which then contracts. It is the ordered stimulation of the muscle that allows efficient contraction of the heart, pumping blood throughout our body. If the natural pacemaker malfunctions, abnormal heartbeats occur which can be very serious and even lead to death.

=== Blood sugar monitoring ===
A continuous blood sugar monitor is used by nearly all Type 1 Diabetics and select Type 2 Diabetics The monitor is applied on the skin of the patient and inserts a thin metal wire into the bloodstream. At the end, this wire contains enzymes to take a small blood sample which uses NAD+ to oxidize glucose into gluconolactone and NAD+ into NADH. This NADH then breaks down in the blood into NAD+, a H+ ion, and two floating electrons which create a small signal, approximately 1 mV, sensed by the wire and displayed by the device the transmitter is connected to. One of the largest issues in developing these blood sugar monitors is filtering and amplifying the minuscule signal from these reactions, as only a small volume of blood can is sampled at once. This means only a small amount of voltage is produced, and throughout the body, there are many more electrical signals being tossed around. To filter this signal, the circuitry utilizes protection diodes, which are filters using resistors and capacitors to rid the system of large signals using zener diodes. Once the large signals are filtered, various operational amplifiers are used to strengthen the signal so digital temperature, analog temperature, and comparator sensors can be used to report the actual blood sugar of the patient.

=== Infrared Thermometers ===
Infrared Thermometers are used to collect temperature data from patients similar to a regular Medical thermometer. However, infrared thermometers are uniquely designed to be used at a distance allowing for contactless readings. The temperature of the patient is determined by capturing the infrared radiation that is constantly emitted from the patients body. This can be done by aiming the device at several parts of the body, most reliably the end of the person's right eyebrow or their wrist. This can result in accurate and reliable readings of patient's temperatures. This device works by collecting the infrared radiation sample through a sensor which converts it into electrical signals. The use of optics and a Thermopile allows for a smooth conversion of signal into a temperature reading. The thermopile absorbs and converts the radiation into heat resulting in a usable voltage that is proportional to the temperature. This newly collected data then gets displayed onto a screen.

=== Mechanical ventilators ===
A mechanical ventilator is a form of life support. It helps the patient breathe or ventilate during surgery or when patient cannot breathe on their own. The patient is connected to the ventilator through a hollow tube called an artificial airway that goes in their month and down their trachea. They remain on the ventilator until they can breathe on their own. We use mechanical ventilators to decrease the work of breathing until the patient improves enough to no longer need it. The machine makes sure the patient receives enough oxygen and removes the carbon dioxide from the body. This is necessary for patients in surgery or with critical illnesses that prevent normal breathing. The benefits of mechanical ventilation are the patient does not have to work hard to breathe, so the patient's respiratory muscles can rest. The patient has time to recover and regain normal breathing. It helps the patient get enough oxygen and clear carbon dioxide, and it preserves a stable airway preventing injury from aspiration.

=== Fitness trackers ===
Bioinstrumentation in the commercial market has seen a large amount of growth in the field of wearables, with wrist-worn activity tracking devices surging from a market value of 0.75 billion U.S. dollars in 2012, to 5.8 billion U.S. dollars in 2018. Bioinstrumentation has also been added to smartphone designs, with smartphones now capable of measuring heart rate, blood-oxygen levels, number of steps taken, and more depending on the device.

=== Biomedical optics ===
Biomedical Optics is the field of performing noninvasive operations and procedures to patients. This has been a growing field, as it is easier and does not require the patient to be opened. Biomedical Optics is made possible through imaging such as CAT (computerized axial tomography) scans. One example of biomedical optics is LASIK eye surgery, which is a laser microsurgery done on the eyes. It helps correcting multiple eye problems, and is much easier than option than other surgeries. Other important aspects of biomedical optics include microscopy and spectroscopy.

=== Genetic testing ===
Bioinstrumentation can be used for genetic testing. This is done with the help of chemistry and medical instruments. Professionals in the field have created tissue analysis instruments, which can compare the DNA of different people. Another example of genetic testing is gel electrophoresis. Gel electrophoresis uses DNA samples, along with biosensors to compare the DNA sequence of individuals. Two other important instruments involved in genomic advances are microarray technology and DNA sequencing. Microarrays reveal the activated and repressed genes of an individual. DNA sequencing uses lasers with different wavelength, to determine the nucleotides present in different DNA strands. Bioinstrumentation has changed the world of genetic testing, and helps scientists understand DNA and the human genome better than ever before.

=== Drug delivery ===
Drug delivery and aiding machines have been improved greatly by bioinstrumentation. Pumps have been created to deliver drugs such as anesthesia and insulin. Before, patients would have to visit doctors more regularly, but with these pumps, they can treat themselves in a faster and cheaper way. Aiding machines include hearing aids and pace makers. Both of these use sensors and circuits, to amplify signals and reveal when there is an issue to the patient.

=== Agriculture ===
Bioinstruments are used immensely in the field of agriculture for monitoring and sampling the soil as well as measure plant growth. Biotechnology in agriculture requires handling compound plant genomes that is done using complex instrumentation. Devices such as tensiometers are used to measure the moisture content of the soil that helps to maintain the most favorable conditions for crop growth. Attaching an electrical transducer to it allows the crop data to be monitored at regular intervals in terms of soil moisture and water profile.

=== Botany ===
In the field of Botany, bioinstruments are widely utilized to gauge plant digestion. The PTM-48A Photosynthesis Monitor is used to register a plant's physiological qualities like carbon dioxide trade, leaf wetness, net photosynthesis and stomatal conductance. PTM-48A is used to analyze the CO_{2} exchange and the transpiration of the leaves through an automatic open system with four-channels. This device's capabilities include the measurement of the CO_{2} exchange of the leaves, CO_{2} concentration in the air, photosynthetically active radiation, Air vapor deficit, etc. The package for the device includes PTM-48A SYSTEM CONSOLE, LC-4B LEAF CHAMBER (4 pcs.), RTH-48 METER, 12 VDC POWER ADAPTER, HOLDER FOR LEAF CHAMBER (4 pcs.), 4-m PVC TWIN HOSE (4 pcs.), STAINLESS STEEL TRIPOD, RS232 COMMUNICATION CABLE FOR PC, DOCUMENTATION and SOFTWARE SETUP CD, CO_{2} ABSORBER, SPARE AIR FILTER, and USER'S GUIDE.

=== Imaging systems ===
An imaging system is a system that creates images of various parts of the body depending on what is needed to be analyzed. the system is used to diagnose conditions before they become too serious. Some examples of imaging systems include x-rays, computed tomography (CT scan), magnetic resonance imaging (MRI), and ultrasound. An x-ray is a non-invasive procedure that analyzes the bones and tumors. A disadvantage of getting an x-ray is the exposure to radiation that may lead to other conditions. A CT scan is a combination of various x-rays that provides a detailed image of organs and layers of tissue in the body. A disadvantage is the slight increased risk of cancer since this non-invasive procedure exposes the patient to radiation

Bioinstruments such as the ChemiDoc Touch framework is an imaging system for electrophoresis and Western blot imaging integrated with a touchscreen on a supercomputer. It utilizes application particular trays for chemiluminescence and UV identification to offer high sensitivity and picture quality.

=== Arterial blood pressure ===
A blood pressure (BP) measurement system specifically a writ-bound BP monitor works through an applanation tonometry with a hemispheric plunger set on the radial artery. Devices such as an ambulatory blood pressure improved the management of hypertension, but remain not being widely used and inconvenient. Uprising innovations such as the HealthSTATS International in Singapore created a wrist-bound BP measurement device (BPro) that would measure BP using arterial tonometry.

Prior to wrist blood pressure cuffs, blood pressures had to be measured invasively by inserting a catheter into one's artery. The catheter is connected to a fluid bag and to a monitor, which picks up the arterial pressure over time. As this is a very invasive procedure, it had to be done inside a medical facility, whereas the new technology of blood pressure cuffs allows monitoring of blood pressure from a person's home. In comparison to write blood pressure measurements, invasive blood pressure monitoring has been shown to result in a more accurate reading, although it does come with drawbacks such as risk of infection.

=== Space ===
The importance of astronaut health monitoring systems have been increasing as the duration of space missions have been consistently growing. With existing space suit bioinstrumentation system, the development of next generation of bioinstrumentation systems made it possible to provide improved health monitoring during extra-vehicular activity. This would especially be resourceful in the most physically demanding phases in space flight.^{[1]} The National Aeronautics and Space Administration (NASA) have developed telemetric sensors in order to monitor physiological changes in animal models in space in their Sensors 2000! program. These sensors measure physiological measurands, including temperature, biopotentials, pressure, flow and acceleration, chemical levels, and transmit these signals from the animals to a receiver through a link connection.

=== Surgery ===
Biomedical instrumentation has been used in the medical world of surgery since the beginning of time and continues to evolve to improve patient care. The continuous integration of imaging and assistive robotics has allowed for surgeries to be more precise as well as less invasive. Imaging systems devices such as cameras, ultrasounds, X-rays, MRIs, PET and CT scans have been used to pinpoint disorders within the body. During surgery ultrasounds and device attached cameras may be used throughout to allow for sight of the treatment area.

Robotics assistive devices are medical instruments that allow for doctors to complete a surgery with a minimal size incision. The use of the assistive device can allow for complicated surgeries to be completed in less time. The robot mimics the doctors movements within the body precisely, which ensures the safety of the procedure. Robotic assistive technology usually includes a camera, mechanical arm, and a console of some sort to allow for controlling. When using assistive devices for minimally invasive procedures many find that another result is shorter recovery times. Although assistive robotics is used in surgery and there are several pros to their use there are some major considerations. If there happens to be a major complication with surgery the robotic system will be removed and previous methods will have to be used. Along with that robotic assistive technology is still rather expensive, thus more research and improvements are constantly being made.

Advancements in anesthetics have also occurred due to innovations in devices. During surgery an anesthesiologist must monitor and evaluate the patients heart rate, breathing, pain, body temperature, fluid balance, blood pressure and many other vital signs. For this reason, an anesthesiologist station is full of medical devices. One major device being the anesthesia machine, which focuses on administration of vaporous anesthesia medication, oxygenation and ventilation.

=== Electrocardiogram ===
Electrocardiograms, or ECGs, are medical instruments used to track the heart's electrical activity. The brain sends signals out via nerves in the brain and/or spinal cord which are then generated and propagated in the heart through the cardiac conduction system (CCS). The impulses begin in the nodal tissue, travel to the sinus node then rapidly through the atrial myocardium, contracting the atria simultaneously, then finally begins to slow down as it reaches the atrioventricular node where it allows the ventricles time to fill. The impulse gains speed again as it enters the bundle of his and then is split into the left and right at the Purkinje fibers and finally reaches the ventricular working cardiomyocytes which depolarize causing a contraction and pumping of blood to the aorta and pulmonary artery. This electrical activity can all be measured and recorded by an ECG.

Electrocardiograms use electrodes and lead wires to read the electrical activity of the heart and display it on a monitor. To monitor these electrical signals we can place electrodes on the skin that are able to detect these electrical fluctuations where electrical activity towards a lead causes an upward deflection while electrical activity away from a lead causes a downward deflection and we can analyze the graph created by these electrical impulses and see what is happening in the heart. This is known as an electrocardiogram or ECG and it measures the electrical activity in the heart by recording the electrical impulses and movement of the heart.

The basic wave pattern consists of the P wave, QRS Complex and the T wave; where the P wave represents atrial depolarization, the QRS complex is three waves of ventricular depolarization at different areas of the ventricles (masking the atrial repolarization), and the T wave shows ventricular repolarization. This visual representation is important to understand because even slight abnormalities can cause fatal consequences if not detected and treated early enough.

Electrocardiograms are used to diagnose a variety of heart conditions such as arrhythmia and hypertrophic cardiomyopathy. Some of the common heart problems an ECG can detect include diagnosis of arrhythmias in the heart and prolonged wave intervals, including the prolonged QT interval (which is a risk factor for ventricular arrhythmias) and both of these conditions are solely diagnosed via ECG. Wave elevation and alteration are also indicators of underlying health issues including coronary artery disease and myocardial infarction. Other cardiovascular diseases including myocarditis, pericarditis, myocardial fibrosis, amyloidosis and others can be represented as curve alterations as well. These changes are more important than ever to catch early on because cardiovascular diseases are the number one cause of death around the world with approximately 17.9 million deaths a year. The use of ECG can not only help diagnose cardiac problems but curve alterations can alert to electrolyte imbalances, hyper- and hypothyroidism, and varying central nervous system disorders.

Existing technology includes the traditional ECG machine that's primarily used within a clinical setting and portable monitors that can be worn for extended periods of time in order to monitor the heart for longer. Traditional ECGs are much more accurate given they consist of 12 leads however it comes with the trade off of patient comfort and function. The 12 leads of the traditional ECG are 3 bipolar limb leads, three unipolar limb leads, and 6 unipolar chest leads and gives a better spatial accuracy and is most often used in ambulatory care and for the exercise stress test monitoring the heart's activity. As ECG technology development has progressed, it has led to the innovation of patch sensors, chest harnesses and more to limit restrictions using a varying number of electrodes and attached leads. Requirements of ECG involve meeting many standards including guidelines for safe use, electrode placement, protection against electrical shock, and requirements for basic safety.

The main goal of the electrocardiogram circuit is to amplify the signal that is coming from the heart, which is relatively small. Electrocardiograms are considered a Class II medical device.

==== Research ====
Bioinstrumentation in research has a variety of applications from standard data collection to prototype testing. One unique example is the use of bioinstrumentation to characterize bone phenotypes of various animal models through strain gauging and tibial loading. Strain gauges translate deformation into an electrical resistance, and when paired with analytical software it can be utilized to determine a bone's response to mechanical load. Different animals or breeds can have different physical responses to mechanical load, thus experiments involving loading normalize to strain rather than load. Strain gauges allow researchers to apply different loads across a variety of subjects to induce the same strain, which is directly correlated with new bone formation. Bioinstrumentation has many more applications in research from development of new bioinstruments to novel incorporation into new medical devices.

==== Real-time measurement ====
Bioinstrumentation has been incorporated into diagnostic tools that are utilized for a variety of patients. The development of 3D-printed ion selective field effect transistors, or ISFETs, to sense and monitor ion levels in patients is a prime example.

Another example of a real-time measurement system is the smart bioelectric pacifier, which was developed to monitor the electrolyte level in vulnerable newborns in hospital care. The pacifier functions through the intake of saliva through a microfluidic channel, which guides saliva to a reservoir filled with sensory nodes within the soft plastic pacifier. Small circuits integrated with ISFETS provide active measurements of any voltage change within the saliva, which can be directly correlated with the concentration of ions within the newborn's saliva and, due to known correlations between ion concentrations in saliva and blood, the bloodstream.

Novel developments in bioinstrumentation continue to lend itself to the development of real-time measurement systems that can provide flexibility, compactness, and efficiency to better monitor patients.

=== Blood Oxygen Saturation ===
Another significant medical device whose use prominently increased during the pandemic is the oximeter. An oximeter is a device that measures the oxygen saturation of the blood in the peripheral circulation. These oximeters have seen significant development over the years such that these devices have been compacted into the size of a small box which can non-invasively measure the blood oxygen level of the person and can be used by the patients themselves at their homes. Oximeter works on the principle of photoplethysmography. Specifically, the working of the oximeter is based on the difference in the light absorption spectrum of oxyhemoglobin and deoxyhemoglobin. Oxyhemoglobin absorbs more infrared light (wavelength of 940 nm) while deoxyhemoglobin absorbs more red light (wavelength of 660 nm). These lights are allowed to illuminate the fingertip one after the other consecutively. The photodiode present in the oximeter detects the light that is able to pass through the bloodstream, and this helps in creating the absorption curve for both lights.

As per Beer Lambert's Law which relates light absorption to the properties of the material through which it passes, these results are capable of indicating the oxygen saturation level of the blood. The signals generated as a result of light detected by the photodiode are then filtered using several operational amplifiers to remove the irregularities in the measurement that might have been generated because of light from the environment reaching the sensor. The signals are then amplified and converted into digital signals using an ADC (Analog to Digital Converter) circuit. These signals are processed using a MATLAB processor to display the SpO_{2} value.

=== Implanted Pressure Sensors ===
Glaucoma causes a gradual decrease in the visual field of those who have it, and it account for around eight percent of blindness globally. Testing for glaucoma generally involves taking measurements of the intraocular pressure (IOP) which can be done at a hospital; However it takes a while for measurements to come back, and a patient's IOP can change throughout the day which has caused a long overdue change in how IOP is measured. The currently proposed solution is continuous pressure sensors that would be implanted within the eye to measure IOP throughout the day. This would allow providers to diagnose glaucomas early and begin preventative treatment sooner, and it provides a way to monitor how well the treatment is working. The implant would work by having pressure sensitive capacitors that would be able to detect a change in IOP. These pressure sensitive capacitors would then alter the resonant frequency of an ASIC. The ASIC's resonant frequency depends on the capacitance, so the IOP can be derived based on the resonant frequency. Most devices are not yet on the market, but are being tested with promising results in patients.

==== Defibrillators ====
A defibrillator is a life-saving medical device that administers an electric charge to correct abnormal heart rhythms, specifically ventricular fibrillation and ventricular tachycardia. These arrhythmias can lead to sudden cardiac arrest, where the heart loses its effective pumping rhythm. There are two main types of defibrillators: Automated External Defibrillators (AEDs) and Implantable Cardioverter-Defibrillators (ICDs). AEDs, often found in public spaces, are portable and user-friendly devices designed for prompt use by bystanders. They provide voice instructions to guide users through the process. ICDs, on the other hand, are surgically implanted devices that automatically monitor heart rhythm and deliver precisely timed electrical signals to prevent further heart damage or death in individuals at high risk of life-threatening arrhythmias.

== Training and certification ==
=== Education ===
A considerable amount of knowledge and training is required to work with Bioinstruments. Biomedical engineering is the main stem of Engineering, under this is a branch called Biomedical instrumentation in which training in equipment use, circuitry, and safety can be found. To work in this area, a considerable amount of knowledge is required in engineering principles as well as biology, in addition to this typically a Bachelor's (B.Sc., B.S., B.Eng. or B.S.E.) or Master's (M.S., M.Sc., M.S.E., or M.Eng.) or a doctoral (Ph.D., or MD-PhD) degree in Biomedical Engineering is required.

=== Licensure/certification ===
As with most professions, there are certain requirements to become a licensed Professional engineer (PE), however in the United States a license is not required to be an employee as an engineer in most situations due to an exception known as the industrial exemption. The current model requires only the practicing engineers offering services that impact the public welfare, safety, health, or property to be licensed while engineering working in the private industry without a direct offering of engineering services to the public or businesses need not be licensed

Biomedical engineering is regulated in some countries, such as Australia, but registration is typically only recommended and not required.

== Constraints and future development ==
Biomedical Instrumentation development comes with constraints as well. Many measurands currently are inaccessible without damaging the measurand. As a result, most have to be measured indirectly. No two physiological systems are the same, but because of these limitations, measurement variation must be compared with "norms" which can vary too. Patient safety also is a key aspect and limitation of Biomedical Instrumentation. Determining the right amount of energy required to obtain data while avoiding damages to biological tissue (which can alter results) can be difficult, especially since no two persons are alike. As a result, equipment reliability and difficulty of operation are held to high standards.

Even with these limitations, the fields of Biomedical Engineering and medicine is growing rapidly, and bioinstrumentation will continue to progress. Since the main focus of the field is to make the medical world faster and more efficient, major improvements in these aspects, as well as in technology and how scientists understand the human body, the field will continue to grow. The main focuses for the future of the field include cellular scanning devices and robots.

=== Cellular scanning devices ===
Olympus introduced two new microscopes, the Fluoview FV1200 biological confocal laser scanning microscope and the Fluview FV1200MPE multiphoton laser scanning microscope, for the focus of life science research in universities and research institutions. These microscopes record high-contrast 3D images by scanning a specimen with a laser beam and detecting the fluorescence. They are readily easy to use and offer more rigidity, higher sensitivity, and lower noise. The FV1200MPE uses an IR laser that would yield higher tissue transparency. This would be resourceful especially with imaging thick cells and tissues that would be difficult with the FV1200.

=== Robots ===
Technology has only been rapidly becoming a part of people's daily life in the modern world that industrial robots such as assembly and conveyance became a part of the work in manufacturing factories. These are one of the personal robots that are expected to become popular in the future, and would operate in joint work and community life with humans. Several examples of humanoid robots in the work include the entertainment humanoid QRIO developed by Sony Corporation. The study of integrating the emotions, behaviors, and personality in a human-like manner in robots is still being understood and researched.

== See also ==
- heart rate Monitor
- Blood oxygen monitor
- Electrocardiography
- Electroencephalography
- Pedometer
- Glucometer
- Sphygmomanometer
