= Richard K. Bernstein =

American endocrinologist and author (1934–2025)

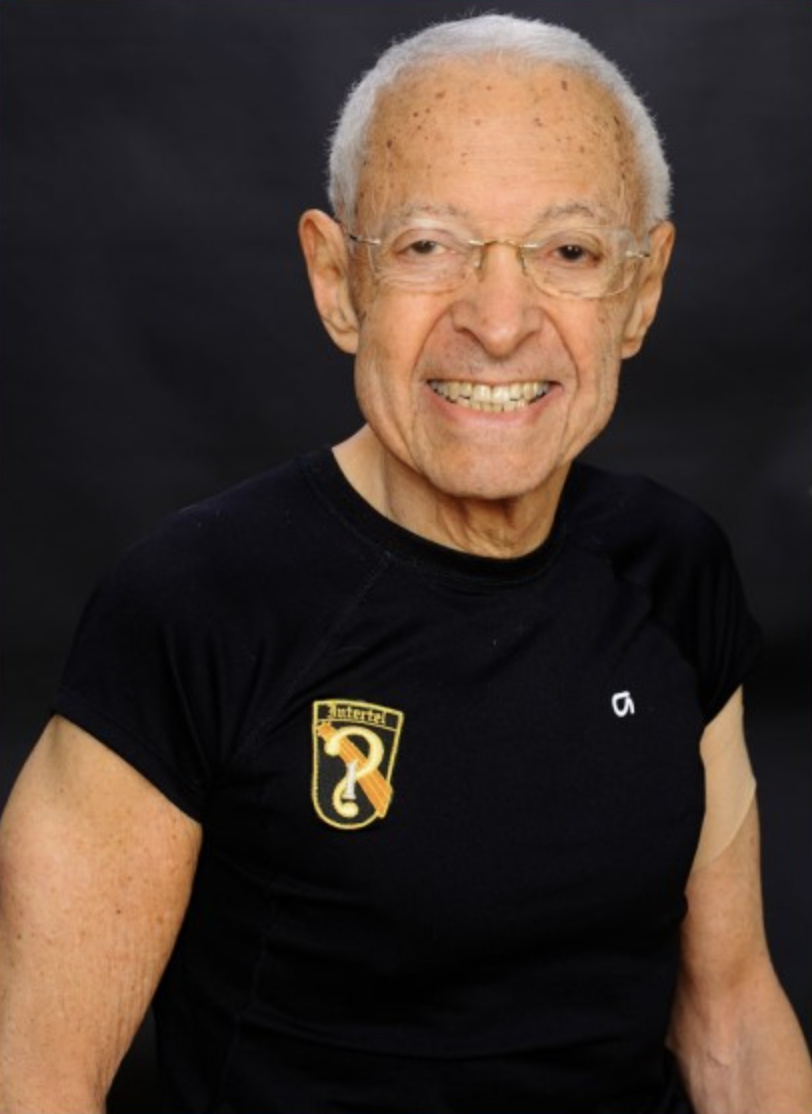
- Richard Bernstein, MD (age 84)
- Born: June 17, 1934; New York City, U.S.
- Died: April 15, 2025 (aged 90)
- Education: The Franklin School; Columbia University (BA, BS); Albert Einstein College of Medicine (MD)
- Known for: Advocacy for a low-carbohydrate diet pioneering self-testing of blood sugar
- Medical career
- Profession: Family physician
- Field: Diabetology

Richard K. Bernstein (June 17, 1934 – April 15, 2025) was an American physician and an advocate for a low-carbohydrate diet and self-testing of blood glucose to help achieve normal blood sugars for diabetics. Bernstein had type 1 diabetes. His private medical practice in Mamaroneck, New York was devoted solely to treating diabetes and prediabetes.

== Life and career ==
Bernstein attended The Franklin School, a college prep school on Upper West Side of Manhattan, graduating in 1950. He then attended Columbia College, initially majoring in physics, then changing his major to mathematics. He graduated with his B.A. in 1954; and then he received a B.S. in engineering in 1955.

After graduating, Bernstein worked as an industrial-management engineer and director of research, development and marketing for Clay Adams, a manufacturer and supplier of medical laboratory equipment. He then became director of corporate planning at National Silver Industries, an importer and manufacturer of housewares.

Bernstein was diagnosed with Type 1 diabetes at age 12 in 1946. In 1969, he sought to acquire a blood glucose testing kit, which at the time were only sold to doctors. At the time, he was a systems engineer. He bought a blood glucose meter manufactured by Miles Laboratories. Because he was not a doctor the meter was issued to his wife, who was a psychiatrist. He adapted the meter to make it portable. He became the first diabetic patient to monitor his own blood sugar.

Bernstein's efforts to publish articles on his experience in medical journals were rejected because he was not a doctor. He applied to and was accepted at the Albert Einstein College of Medicine at age 45, becoming the oldest person to be accepted to the medical school. During his first year in medical school, he wrote a book detailing his self-testing method, Diabetes: The Glucograph Method for Normalizing Blood Sugar.. He completed medical school in 1982, then completed his internal medicine internship through New York Medical College, and specialized in endocrinology. (Note: Bernstein was a Fellow of the American College of Endocrinology (F.A.C.E), which recognizes achievement in Endocrinology.)

After his internship, he established a private clinical practice in Mamaroneck, New York, where he taught his patients the treatment methods for diabetes based on his own experience. Bernstein died on April 15, 2025, at the age of 90. He was preceded in death by his wife, Anne E. Bernstein, MD, in 2016.

== Bibliography ==
- Bernstein, Richard K. (November 1, 2011), Dr. Bernstein's Diabetes Solution: The Complete Guide to Achieving Normal Blood Sugars (Hardcover 4th ed.), Little, Brown & Company, ISBN 978-0-316-18269-0
- Bernstein, Richard K. (January 3, 2005), The Diabetes Diet: Dr. Bernstein's Low-Carbohydrate Solution, Little, Brown & Company, ISBN 978-0-316-73784-5
- Bernstein, Richard K. (November 1990), Diabetes Type II: Living a Long, Healthy Life Through Blood Sugar Normalization (1st ed.), Prentice Hall Trade
- Bernstein, Richard K. (February 1, 1981), Diabetes: The GlucograF Method for Normalizing Blood Sugar, Crown
