= Ames Reflectance Meter =

- Purpose: patients with diabetes to self-monitor

The Ames Reflectance Meter was the first blood glucose meter. It allowed patients with diabetes to self-monitor their blood glucose levels.

The Ames Reflectance Meter was developed in 1970 by Anton H. Clemens. It had a needle that indicated the intensity of blue light reflected from a paper strip, called Dextrostix. The meter gave a quantitative number that was correlated with glucose levels in blood that the Dextrostix was exposed to.

The Dextrostix was developed about a decade earlier. It was a paper strip with chemistry immobilized onto it. When the paper strip was dipped into blood, it changed color to a shade of blue. The exact shade of blue was dependent on the level of glucose in the blood.

The meter weighed about 3 pounds and sold for $650. It was initially marketed to physician's offices, not patients. One man with diabetes, Richard K. Bernstein, managed to buy one because his wife was a physician. He used the machine to map out the daily fluctuations in his blood glucose levels. This knowledge allowed him to manage his diet and insulin injections better to maintain steady, normal blood glucose levels.
