= Penicillium amagasakiense =

Scientific classification
- Kingdom: Fungi
- Division: Ascomycota
- Class: Eurotiomycetes
- Order: Eurotiales
- Family: Aspergillaceae
- Genus: Penicillium
- Species: P. amagasakiense

Binomial name
- Penicillium amagasakiense Kusai 1960

Species of fungus

Penicillium amagasakiense is an anamorph fungus species of the genus of Penicillium. The Glucose oxidase of Penicillium amagasakiense has been studied in detail because of the use of Glucose oxidase in biosensors and fermentation fluids.

== See also ==
- List of Penicillium species
