= Glucose 1-dehydrogenase (NADP+) =

glucose 1-dehydrogenase (NADP^{+})

Identifiers
- EC no.: 1.1.1.119
- CAS no.: 37250-50-3

Databases
- IntEnz: IntEnz view
- BRENDA: BRENDA entry
- ExPASy: NiceZyme view
- KEGG: KEGG entry
- MetaCyc: metabolic pathway
- PRIAM: profile
- PDB structures: RCSB PDB PDBe PDBsum
- Gene Ontology: AmiGO / QuickGO
Search
- PMC: articles
- PubMed: articles
- NCBI: proteins

In enzymology, glucose 1-dehydrogenase (NADP^{+}) (EC 1.1.1.119) is an enzyme that catalyzes the chemical reaction

D-glucose
+ NADP^{+}
H^{+}
H^{+}
glucono-δ-lactone
+ NADPH

The two substrates of this enzyme are D-glucose and oxidised nicotinamide adenine dinucleotide phosphate (NADP^{+}). Its products are glucono-δ-lactone, reduced NADPH, and a proton.

This enzyme belongs to the family of oxidoreductases, specifically those acting on the CH-OH group of donor with NAD^{+} or NADP^{+} as acceptor. The systematic name of this enzyme class is D-glucose:NADP^{+} 1-oxidoreductase. Other names in common use include nicotinamide adenine dinucleotide phosphate-linked aldohexose, dehydrogenase, NADP^{+}-linked aldohexose dehydrogenase, NADP^{+}-dependent glucose dehydrogenase, and glucose 1-dehydrogenase (NADP^{+}).

== See also ==
- Glucose 1-dehydrogenase (NAD+) which catalyses the same reaction but uses an alternative cofactor.
