= Consensus error grid =

Tool for evaluating blood glucose meter accuracy

The consensus error grid (also known as the Parkes error grid) was developed as a new tool for evaluating the accuracy of a blood glucose meter. In recent times, the consensus error grid has been used increasingly by blood glucose meter manufacturers in their clinical studies. It was published in August 2000 by Joan L. Parkes, Stephen L. Slatin, Scott Pardo, and Barry H. Ginsberg. The guidelines for ISO15197:2013 specify the usage of the consensus error grid for evaluation of blood glucose monitoring systems.

== See also ==
- Clarke error grid

== Sources ==
- http://care.diabetesjournals.org/cgi/reprint/23/8/1143
