= Detlev Müller =

Danish academic and researcher

- Born: 1899
- Died: 1993 (aged 93–94)
- Occupation: Botanist

Detlev Müller was a Professor of Botany at the University of Copenhagen. He is best known for discovering the enzyme, glucose oxidase, in 1925, and the alcohol-metabolizing enzyme alcohol dehydrogenase in 1933.

In 1928, he was experimenting with the common fungus, Aspergillus niger. Müller noted that this fungus prevented some bacteria colonies from growing. He eventually found that these bacteria could only thrive adjacent to Aspergillus niger if glucose was not present. He eventually isolated the factor that caused the curious effect. The factor was glucose oxidase. In the presence of glucose, the glucose oxidase produced hydrogen peroxide, which killed off the bacteria. He discovered the enzyme’s selectivity for glucose in 1929 and published it in the journal Biochem. Z.
