= Glucose 1-dehydrogenase (NAD+) =

Catalyzing enzyme

glucose 1-dehydrogenase (NAD^{+})

Identifiers
- EC no.: 1.1.1.118
- CAS no.: 37250-49-0

Databases
- IntEnz: IntEnz view
- BRENDA: BRENDA entry
- ExPASy: NiceZyme view
- KEGG: KEGG entry
- MetaCyc: metabolic pathway
- PRIAM: profile
- PDB structures: RCSB PDB PDBe PDBsum
- Gene Ontology: AmiGO / QuickGO
Search
- PMC: articles
- PubMed: articles
- NCBI: proteins

In enzymology, glucose 1-dehydrogenase (NAD^{+}) (EC 1.1.1.118) is an enzyme that catalyzes the chemical reaction

D-glucose
+ NAD^{+}
H^{+}
H^{+}
glucono-δ-lactone
+ NADH

The two substrates of this enzyme are D-glucose and oxidised nicotinamide adenine dinucleotide (NAD^{+}). Its products are glucono-δ-lactone, reduced NADH, and a proton.

This enzyme belongs to the family of oxidoreductases, specifically those acting on the CH-OH group of donor with NAD^{+} or NADP^{+} as acceptor. The systematic name of this enzyme class is D-glucose:NAD^{+} 1-oxidoreductase. Other names in common use include D-glucose:NAD^{+} oxidoreductase, D-aldohexose dehydrogenase, and glucose 1-dehydrogenase (NAD^{+}).

== Structural studies ==
As of late 2007, 3 structures have been solved for this class of enzymes, with PDB accession codes 2DTD, 2DTE, and 2DTX.

== See also ==
- Glucose 1-dehydrogenase (NADP+) which catalyses the same reaction but uses an alternative cofactor.
