= Glucose 1-dehydrogenase =

glucose 1-dehydrogenase
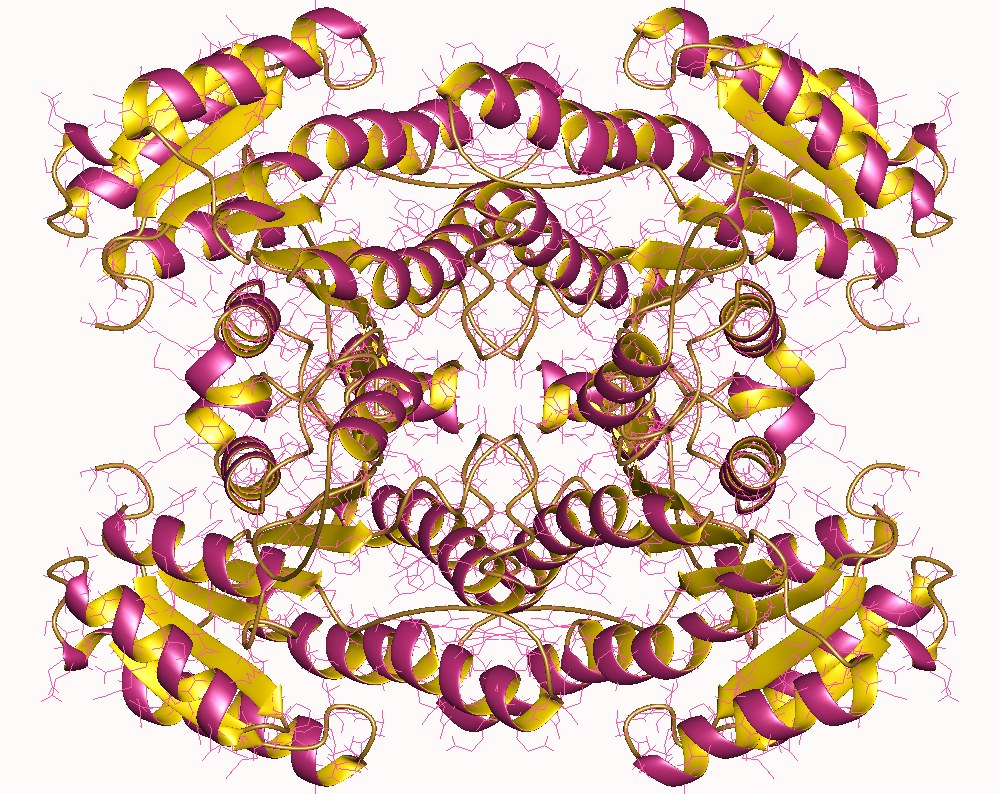
- Glucose dehydrogenase tetramer, Caenorhabditis Elegans

Identifiers
- EC no.: 1.1.1.47
- CAS no.: 9028-53-9

Databases
- IntEnz: IntEnz view
- BRENDA: BRENDA entry
- ExPASy: NiceZyme view
- KEGG: KEGG entry
- MetaCyc: metabolic pathway
- PRIAM: profile
- PDB structures: RCSB PDB PDBe PDBsum
- Gene Ontology: AmiGO / QuickGO
Search
- PMC: articles
- PubMed: articles
- NCBI: proteins

In enzymology, glucose 1-dehydrogenase (EC 1.1.1.47) is an enzyme that catalyzes the chemical reaction

β-D-Glucopyranose
+ NAD^{+}
H^{+}
H^{+}
Glucono-δ-lactone
+ NADH

The two substrates of this enzyme are β-D-glucose and oxidised nicotinamide adenine dinucleotide (NAD^{+}). Its products are D-glucono-1,5-lactone, reduced NADH, and a proton. The enzyme can alternatively use nicotinamide adenine dinucleotide phosphate (NADP^{+}) for oxidation and in that case produces NADPH.

This enzyme belongs to the family of oxidoreductases, specifically those acting on the CH-OH group of donor with NAD^{+} or NADP^{+} as acceptor. The systematic name of this enzyme class is beta-D-glucose:NAD(P)^{+} 1-oxidoreductase. Another name in common use is D-glucose dehydrogenase (NAD(P)^{+}).

== Structural studies ==
As of late 2007, 9 structures have been solved for this class of enzymes, with PDB accession codes 1G6K, 1GCO, 1GEE, 1RWB, 1SPX, 2B5V, 2B5W, 2CD9, and 2CDA.
