= Perfluoro tert-butylcyclohexane =

Chemical compound

Clinical data
- Trade names: Oxycyte

Identifiers
- CAS Number: 84808-64-0
- PubChem CID: 15710945
- DrugBank: DB12477
- UNII: 3ZX1Z33VUU
- CompTox Dashboard (EPA): DTXSID70233868
- ECHA InfoCard: 100.245.872

Chemical and physical data
- Formula: C_{10}F_{20}
- Molar mass: 500.078 g·mol^{−1}
- 3D model (JSmol): Interactive image
- SMILES: C(C(F)(F)F)(C(F)(F)F)(C(F)(F)F)C1(F)C(F)(F)C(F)(F)C(F)(F)C(F)(F)C1(F)F
- InChI: InChI=1S/C10F20/c11-2(1(8(22,23)24,9(25,26)27)10(28,29)30)3(12,13)5(16,17)7(20,21)6(18,19)4(2,14)15; Key:VLTXBOGHSBHSAC-UHFFFAOYSA-N

Perfluoro tert-butylcyclohexane is a perfluorinated chemical compound (or perfluorocarbon, PFC). It is a component of the empirical therapeutic oxygen carrier called Oxycyte.

== Chemical properties ==
Perfluoro tert-butyl-cyclo-hexane is a saturated alicyclic perfluorocarbon with the molecular formula C_{10}F_{20}. Fluorocarbons are known for their strong gas-dissolving properties which, when used with oxygen, serve a dual role of healing the tissue as well as imaging. It fits the imaging role promisingly due to its biocompatibility and half-life. A similar compound, perfluoro-butane, is already used for ultrasound imaging. Healing decompression sickness with oxygen has a similar mechanism of action to healing brain anemia, and so Oxycyte can be used for this.

== Oxycyte ==
Oxycyte is a perfluorocarbon (PFC) product composed of submicron particles of perfluoro(t-butylcyclohexane) in a 60% w/v concentration with an egg phospholipid emulsifier.

Oxycyte was invented by Leland Clark and developed by Tenex Therapeutics, formerly Oxygen Biotherapeutics, Inc. and Synthetic Blood International. It is designed to enhance oxygen delivery to damaged tissues. Through a collaborative agreement, Oxycyte (under the development code name of ABL-101) was being developed by Aurum Biosciences Ltd, with an initial indication in acute ischemic stroke.

Tenex claims that Oxycyte can carry oxygen with up to 5 times the efficiency of hemoglobin when used as an intravenous emulsion, making it an effective means of transporting oxygen to tissues and carrying carbon dioxide to the lungs for disposal. However, because Oxycyte is a PFC and not based on hemoglobin, it does not have the safety issues associated with hemoglobin-based products. There have been no adverse events in company clinical trials related to Oxycyte. Tenex believed Oxycyte has a very favorable risk-benefit profile for its potential indications.

Aurum Biosciences promoted Oxycyte as having potential use in multiple indications, including cardiology, oncology, and treating epilepsy and neurodegenerative diseases. These claims raised Tenex's stock price to its peak. Since then, the stock price has plummeted with no signs of recovery.

Around September 2004, Oxycyte completed Phase I trials with few mild side effects. Clinical interest in Oxycyte began to grow during this period, culminating in 2013.

Aurum Biosciences received a Wellcome Trust HICF funding to conduct a Phase I clinical trial with Oxycyte in stroke patients. This study investigated both therapeutic potential and its ability to enhance the diagnostic potential of an MRI in suspected stroke patients.

In September 2014, Oxygen Biotherapeutics announced the discontinuation of a Phase IIB trial for its Oxycyte drug candidate, citing "difficulties enrolling patients". Clinical interest in Oxycyte has since tapered off.

Oxycyte has been linked to potentially dangerous variations in blood viscosity.
