= Clarke Error Grid =

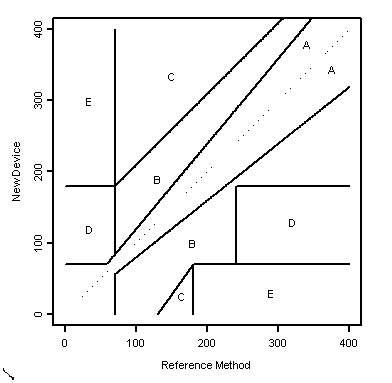
The Clarke Error Grid

The Clarke Error Grid Analysis (EGA) was developed in 1987 to quantify the clinical accuracy of patient estimates of their current blood glucose as provided by a blood glucose meter. This technique was then applied to quantify the clinical accuracy of blood glucose estimates generated by personal meters as compared to values from a laboratory reference test. A description of the EGA appeared in Diabetes Care in 1987. Eventually, the EGA became accepted as one of the “gold standard” techniques for determining the accuracy of blood glucose meters.

To perform the analysis, blood glucose samples are obtained and each sample is divided and measured by two meters: a "reference method" (a meter or laboratory test known to produce accurate results); and a new meter being evaluated. A scatterplot is generated, plotting values from the reference glucose meter (x-axis) against values from the new device (y-axis); thus, each point represents measurement of a single sample by two methods.

Grid lines are then drawn to indicate 5 different classifications (Regions A-E) based on clinical relevance:

- Region A: the new meter's values differ from the reference meter's values by no more than 20% (suggesting the new meter produces accurate values);
- Region B: the new meter's values differ from the reference meter's values by greater than 20%, but treatment to regulate a patient's blood glucose based on values from the new meter would not be inappropriate;
- Region C: the new meter's values suggest treatment to regulate a patient's blood glucose is necessary, however, the reference meter suggests treatment is unnecessary;
- Region D: the new meter's values are so inaccurate that it would fail to detect potentially dangerous hypoglycemia or hyperglycemia; and
- Region E: the new meter not only fails to detect potentially dangerous hypoglycemia or hyperglycemia (as in Region D), but it also mistakes one condition for the other (for example, reporting a hyperglycemic value when the sample is actually hypoglycemic, or vice versa).

== See also ==
- Consensus error grid
