= Glucose 1-dehydrogenase (FAD, quinone) =

glucose 1-dehydrogenase (FAD, quinone)

Identifiers
- EC no.: 1.1.5.9
- CAS no.: 37250-84-3

Databases
- BRENDA: enzyme data
- ExPASy: NiceZyme view
- KEGG: enzyme entry
- MetaCyc: metabolic pathway
- Rhea: reactions
- PDB structures: RCSB PDB PDBe PDBsum
- Gene Ontology: AmiGO / QuickGO
Search
- PMC: articles
- PubMed: articles
- NCBI: proteins

In enzymology, a glucose 1-dehydrogenase (FAD, quinone) (EC 1.1.5.9) is an enzyme that catalyzes the chemical reaction

D-glucose + a quinone $\rightleftharpoons$ D-glucono-1,5-lactone + a quinol

Thus, the two substrates of this enzyme are D-glucose and a quinone, whereas its two products are D-glucono-1,5-lactone and a quinol.

This enzyme belongs to the family of oxidoreductases, specifically those acting on the CH-OH group of donor with other acceptors. The systematic name of this enzyme class is D-glucose:acceptor 1-oxidoreductase. Other names in common use include glucose dehydrogenase (Aspergillus), glucose dehydrogenase (decarboxylating), and D-glucose:(acceptor) 1-oxidoreductase. This enzyme participates in pentose phosphate pathway. It employs one cofactor, FAD.
