= Cygnus Inc =

Biotechnology company

Cygnus, Inc. was a biotechnology company that dissolved in 2007. At its inception in 1985, Cygnus was engaged in development and manufacturing of transdermal drug delivery systems, including products for contraception, hormone therapy and smoking cessation. The company also developed the GlucoWatch, a non-invasive glucose monitoring devices for manufacture and commercialization. When GlucoWatch was launched in early 2002, the product sales of GlucoWatch were much lower than expected. According to the Company, the reasons for failure included adoption barriers for new technology, need for a paradigm shift in the management of diabetes, lack of widespread medical reimbursement, and performance characteristics of the device.

== History ==
First, the GlucoWatch faced difficulties in its clinical efficacy and reproducibility of measurements. Cygnus did not resolve these technical feasibility issues and was unable to replace the standard glucose monitoring device that was on the market.

Second, Cygnus lacked an effective managed care resources group. Without a substantial reimbursement level, it is very difficult for healthcare organizations to approve the GlucoWatch for its beneficiaries at the price that Cygnus was selling it. Furthermore, Cygnus failed to show the cost benefits of the device.

Third, Cygnus entered into a problematic co-promotion agreement with Sankyo Pharmaceuticals in 2000 that ended unexpectedly. Glucose monitoring products that are new to the market require a sizeable sales force to educate healthcare professionals and end user, and to create product awareness in various marketing channels. After Sankyo left the agreement, Cygnus was very low on cash and reduced the work force by 60%. Cygnus did not have enough resources or infrastructure to perform sales and marketing activities on its own.

In October 2002, the Company failed to meet the minimum price per share and minimum market capitalization listing requirements of the Nasdaq National Market and National Small Cap Market. As a result, its stock was delisted from NASDAQ and transferred to OTC bulletin board. Manufacturing activities and R&D efforts for future products were suspended. Due to Cygnus’ weak financial condition, operating losses, and lack of a marketing partner, the company's board of directors decided to sell off substantial operating assets, wind-up operations and subsequently dissolve and liquidate.

In December 2004, Cygnus Inc. entered into an asset purchase agreement with Animas Corporation and Animas Technologies LLC in exchange for $10 million USD in cash. The asset sale was completed in March 2005. The Company retained some cash and equivalents, and accounts receivables but no operating assets and no means to generate revenue, other than pending arbitration with Ortho-McNeil Pharmaceutical Inc. The headquarters lease terminated and Cygnus moved to a single office in San Francisco. The arbitration with Ortho-McNeil was settled in September 2005. Ortho-McNeil paid $4 million USD in cash to Cygnus. The company had planned to wait till this settlement to file its certificate of dissolution.

In November 2005, the Company filed 10Q indicating intention to file Certification of Dissolution. As a result, trading of Company’s common stock on OTC Bulletin Board stopped. The close of business was on November 21, 2005. Cygnus had never been profitable in its 17 years of history.
