= Leland Clark =

American biochemist

Leland C. Clark Jr.
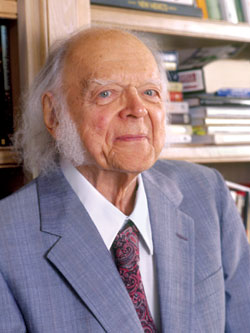
- Dr. Clark, c. 2005
- Born: December 4, 1918; Rochester, New York, United States
- Died: September 25, 2005 (aged 86)
- Education: Antioch College; University of Rochester
- Known for: Inventor of the Clark oxygen electrode

Leland C. Clark Jr. (December 4, 1918 – September 25, 2005) was an American biochemist born in Rochester, New York. He is most well known as the inventor of the Clark electrode, a device used for measuring oxygen in blood, water and other liquids. Clark is considered the "father of biosensors", and the modern-day glucose sensor used daily by millions of diabetics is based on his research. He conducted pioneering research on heart-lung machines in the 1940s and '50s and was holder of more than 25 patents. Although he developed a fluorocarbon-based liquid that could be breathed successfully by mice in place of air, his lifelong goal of developing artificial blood remained unfulfilled at the time of his death. He is the inventor of Oxycyte, a third-generation perfluorocarbon (PFC) therapeutic oxygen carrier designed to enhance oxygen delivery to damaged tissues.

== Professional life ==
Clark received his B.S. degree in chemistry from Antioch College in 1941 and his Ph.D. in biochemistry and physiology from the University of Rochester in 1944. Clark began his professional career as an assistant professor of biochemistry at his alma mater, Antioch College, in Yellow Springs, Ohio. When he left Antioch in 1958, he was head of the department. From 1955 to 1958, he held a simultaneous appointment the University of Cincinnati College of Medicine as a Senior Research Associate in Pediatrics and Surgery. In 1958, Clark moved to Alabama to join the Department of Surgery, University of Alabama Medical College as an associate professor of biochemistry. He later became professor of biochemistry in the same department.

In 1962, he invented the first biosensor with Champ Lyons. Clark later became professor of research pediatrics at the Cincinnati Children’s Hospital Research Foundation in 1968 and remained there until he retired in 1991. Afterwards, he helped to found the company Synthetic Blood International, now known as Oxygen Biotherapeutics, Inc., which markets his invention Oxycyte.

Other Clark inventions were put into production and marketed by Yellow Springs Instrument Company.

He was a founding member of the Editorial Board of the scientific journal Biosensors & Bioelectronics in 1985.

== Personal life ==
Clark was known as "Lee" to his friends. He met Eleanor Wyckoff while an undergraduate student at Antioch and they were married in 1939. She assisted him in his research throughout his career. They had four daughters.

== Honors and awards ==
Dr. Clark received the following recognition for his work: National Research Council Fellowship (1941). NIH Research Career Award (1962). Distinguished Lecturer Award, American College of Chest Physicians (1975). Honorary Doctor of Science, University of Rochester School of Medicine and Dentistry (1984). Horace Mann Award for Service to Humanity, Antioch College (1984). Heyrovsky Award in Recognition of the Invention of the Membrane-Covered Polarographic Oxygen Electrode (1985). American Association for Clinical Chemistry Award for Outstanding Contributions to Clinical Chemistry (1989). American Heart Association Samuel Kaplan Visionary Award (1991). Enshrinement into the Engineering and Science Hall of Fame (1991). Pharmacia Biosensor’s Sensational Contributions to the Advancement of Biosensor Technology Award (1992). Daniel Drake Award for Outstanding Achievements in Research, University of Cincinnati College of Medicine (1993). Elected to the National Academy of Engineering (1995). National Academy of Engineering Fritz J. and Dolores H. Russ Prize (2005).

== Selected publications ==
- Clark, L.C., Wolf, R., Granger, D., Taylor, Z. (1953). Continuous recording of blood oxygen tensions by polarography. Journal of Applied Physiology, 6: 189-193.
- Clark, L.C., Gollan, F. (1966). Survival of mammals breathing organic liquids equilibrated with oxygen at atmospheric pressure. Science, 152:1755–1756.
