= Glucose oxidase =

Class of enzymes

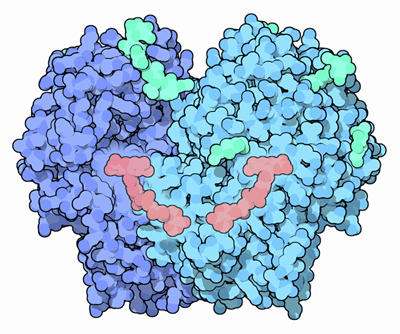
- Structure of glucose oxidase dimer (dark and light blue) complexed with FAD (salmon) and glycans (aquamarine) from Penicillium amagasakiense.

Identifiers
- EC no.: 1.1.3.4
- CAS no.: 9001-37-0

Databases
- IntEnz: IntEnz view
- BRENDA: BRENDA entry
- ExPASy: NiceZyme view
- KEGG: KEGG entry
- MetaCyc: metabolic pathway
- PRIAM: profile
- PDB structures: RCSB PDB PDBe PDBsum
- Gene Ontology: AmiGO / QuickGO
Search
- PMC: articles
- PubMed: articles
- NCBI: proteins

Glucose oxidase

Names
- Other names Oxidase, glucose

Identifiers
CAS Number	9001-37-0
ChemSpider	none
ECHA InfoCard	100.029.625
EC Number	232-601-0
E number	E1102 (additional chemicals)
KEGG	1.1.3.4
UNII	0T8392U5N1
CompTox Dashboard (EPA)	DTXSID201010878

Properties
Chemical formula	(C_{6}H_{10}O_{5})_{n}
Molar mass	variable
Appearance	white or yellow powder
- Except where otherwise noted, data are given for materials in their standard state (at 25 °C [77 °F], 100 kPa). verify (what is ?) Infobox references

The glucose oxidase enzyme (GOx or GOD) also known as notatin (EC number 1.1.3.4) is an oxidoreductase that catalyses the oxidation of glucose to hydrogen peroxide and D-glucono-δ-lactone. This enzyme is produced by certain species of fungi and insects and displays antibacterial activity when oxygen and glucose are present.

Reaction catalyzed by glucose oxidase

Glucose oxidase is widely used for the determination of free glucose in body fluids (medical testing), in vegetal raw material, and in the food industry. It also has many applications in biotechnologies, typically enzyme assays for biochemistry including biosensors in nanotechnologies.

It was first isolated by Detlev Müller in 1928 during his work with the common fungus Aspergillus niger. Müller noted that this fungus prevented some bacteria colonies from growing. He eventually found that these bacteria could only thrive adjacent to Aspergillus niger if glucose was not present. He eventually isolated the factor that caused the curious effect. The factor was glucose oxidase. In the presence of glucose, the glucose oxidase produced hydrogen peroxide, which killed off the bacteria. He discovered the enzyme’s selectivity for glucose in 1929 and published it in the journal Biochem. Z. .

== Function ==
Several species of fungi and insects synthesize glucose oxidase, which produces hydrogen peroxide, which kills bacteria.

Notatin, extracted from antibacterial cultures of Penicillium notatum, was originally named Penicillin A, but was renamed to avoid confusion with penicillin. Notatin was shown to be identical to Penicillin B and glucose oxidase, enzymes extracted from other molds besides P. notatum; it is now generally known as glucose oxidase.

Early experiments showed that notatin exhibits in vitro antibacterial activity (in the presence of glucose) due to hydrogen peroxide formation. In vivo tests showed that notatin was not effective in protecting rodents from Streptococcus haemolyticus, Staphylococcus aureus, or salmonella, and caused severe tissue damage at some doses.

Glucose oxidase is also produced by the hypopharyngeal glands of honeybee workers and deposited into honey where it acts as a natural preservative. GOx at the surface of the honey reduces atmospheric O_{2} to hydrogen peroxide (H_{2}O_{2}), which acts as an antimicrobial barrier.

== Structure ==
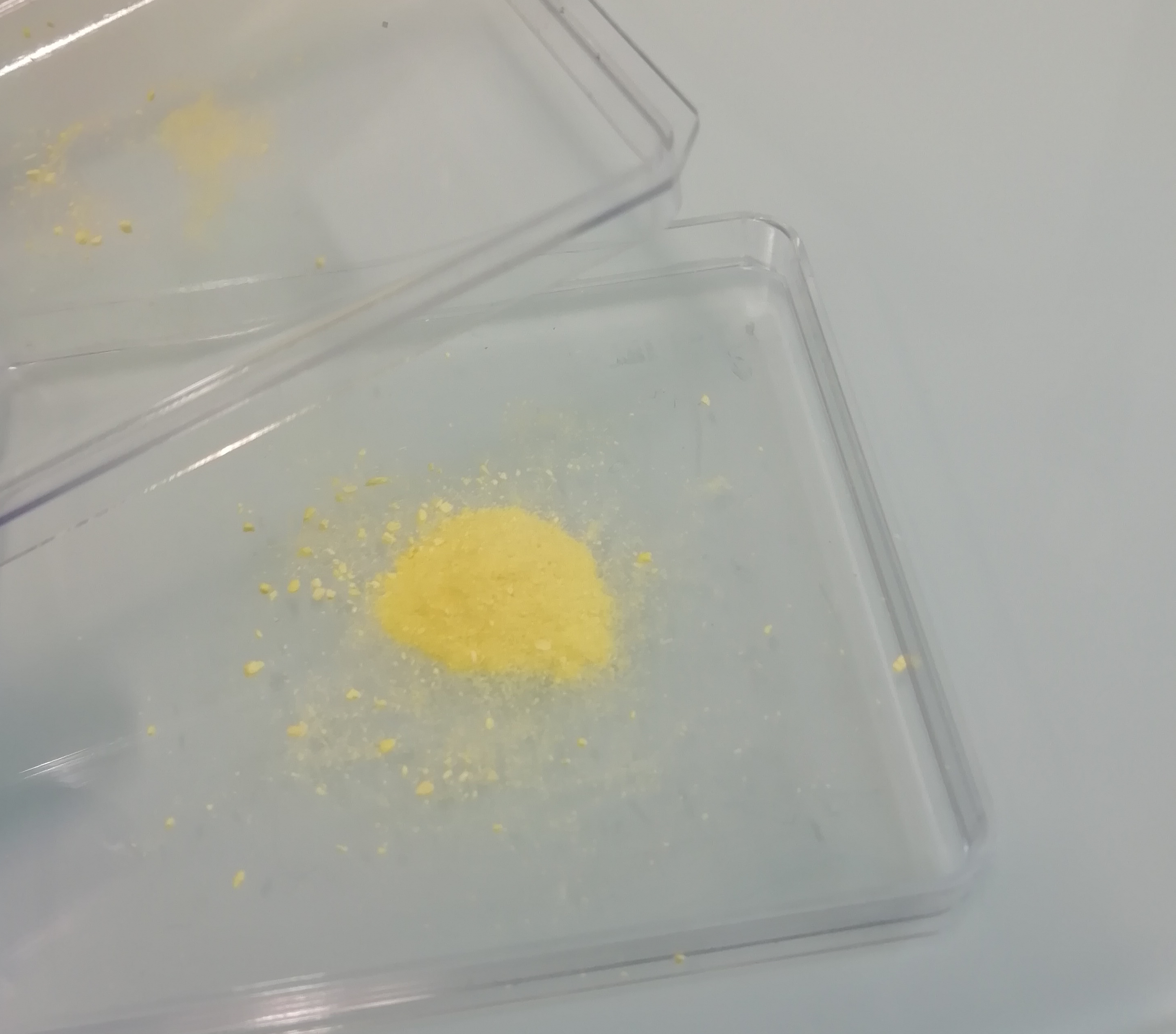
Glucose oxidase enzyme powder from Aspergillus niger.

GOx is a dimeric protein, the 3D structure of which has been elucidated. The active site where glucose binds is in a deep pocket. The enzyme, like many proteins that act outside of cells, is covered with carbohydrate chains. GOx is a glucose oxidising enzyme with a molecular weight of 160 kDa. It is a dimeric glycoprotein consisting of two subunits each weighing 80 kDa. Flavinadenine dinucleotide (FAD) in the active site is buried approximately 1.5 nm inside the protein shell and acts as the initial electron acceptor.

== Mechanism ==
At pH 7, glucose exists in solution in cyclic hemiacetal form as 63.6% β-D-glucopyranose and 36.4% α-D-glucopyranose, the proportion of linear and furanose form being negligible. The glucose oxidase binds specifically to β-D-glucopyranose and does not act on α-D-glucose. It oxidises all of the glucose in solution because the equilibrium between the α and β anomers is driven towards the β side as it is consumed in the reaction.

Glucose oxidase catalyzes the oxidation of β-D-glucose into D-glucono-1,5-lactone, which then hydrolyzes into gluconic acid.

In order to work as a catalyst, GOx requires a coenzyme, flavin adenine dinucleotide (FAD). FAD is a common component in biological oxidation-reduction (redox) reactions. Redox reactions involve a gain or loss of electrons from a molecule. In the GOx-catalyzed redox reaction, FAD works as the initial electron acceptor and is reduced to FADH^{−}. Then FADH^{−} is oxidized by the final electron acceptor, molecular oxygen (O_{2}), which can do so because it has a higher reduction potential. O_{2} is then reduced to hydrogen peroxide (H_{2}O_{2}).

== Applications ==
=== Glucose monitoring ===
Glucose oxidase is widely used coupled to peroxidase reaction that visualizes colorimetrically the formed H_{2}O_{2}, for the determination of free glucose in sera or blood plasma for diagnostics, using spectrometric assays manually or with automated procedures, and even point-of-use rapid assays.

Similar assays allows the monitoring of glucose levels in fermentation, bioreactors, and to control glucose in vegetal raw material and food products. In the glucose oxidase assay, the glucose is first oxidized, catalyzed by glucose oxidase, to produce gluconate and hydrogen peroxide. The hydrogen peroxide is then oxidatively coupled with a chromogen to produce a colored compound which may be measured spectroscopically. For example, hydrogen peroxide together with 4 amino-antipyrene (4-AAP) and phenol in the presence of peroxidase yield a red quinoeimine dye that can be measured at 505 nm. The absorbance at 505 nm is proportional to concentration of glucose in the sample.

Enzymatic glucose biosensors use an electrode instead of O_{2} to take up the electrons needed to oxidize glucose and produce an electronic current in proportion to glucose concentration. This is the technology behind the disposable glucose sensor strips used by diabetics to monitor serum glucose levels.

=== Food preservation ===
In manufacturing, GOx is used as an additive thanks to its oxidizing effects: it prompts for stronger dough in baking, replacing oxidants such as bromate. It is also used as a food preservative to help remove oxygen and glucose from food when packaged such as dry egg powder to prevent unwanted browning and undesired taste.

=== Wound treatment ===
Wound care products, such as "Flaminal Hydro" make use of an alginate hydrogel containing glucose oxidase and other components as an oxidation agent.

== Clinical trials ==
A nasal spray from a bag-on-valve device that mixes glucose oxidase with glucose has undergone clinical trials in 2016 for the prevention and treatment of the common cold.

== See also ==
- Oxidoreductase
- Glucose meter
