= Glucono-δ-lactone =

D-Gluconic acid δ-lactone

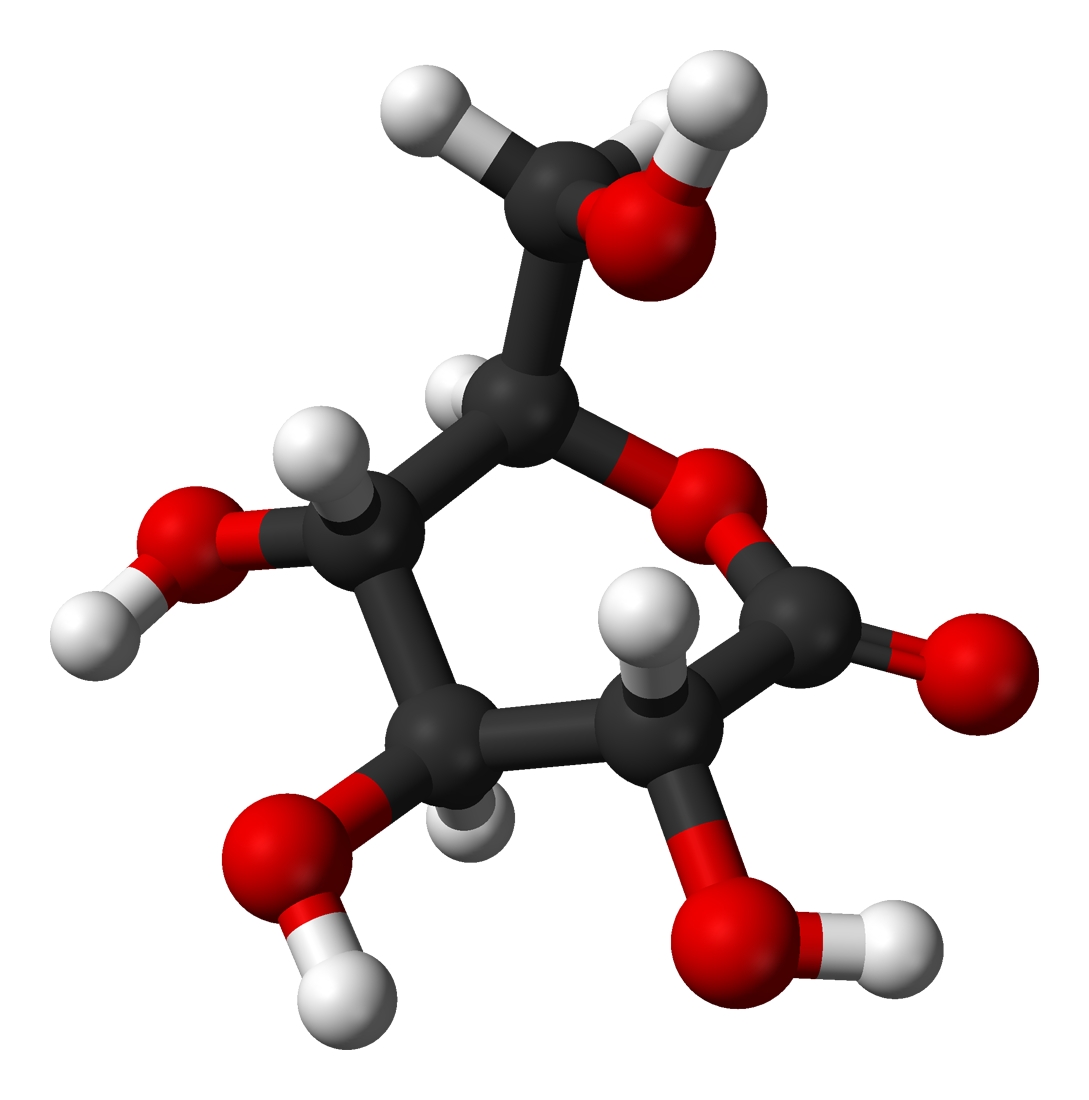

Names
- IUPAC name D-Glucono-1,5-lactone
- Systematic IUPAC name (3R,4S,5S,6R)-3,4,5-Trihydroxy-6-(hydroxymethyl)oxan-2-one

Identifiers
CAS Number	90-80-2
3D model (JSmol)	Interactive image
ChEBI	CHEBI:16217
ChEMBL	ChEMBL1200829
ChemSpider	6760
DrugBank	DB04564
ECHA InfoCard	100.001.833
EC Number	202-016-5
E number	E575 (acidity regulators, ...)
KEGG	D04332
PubChem CID	736
UNII	WQ29KQ9POT
CompTox Dashboard (EPA)	DTXSID0026549
- InChI: InChI=1S/C6H10O6/c7-1-2-3(8)4(9)5(10)6(11)12-2/h2-5,7-10H,1H2/t2-,3-,4+,5-/m1/s1 Key: PHOQVHQSTUBQQK-SQOUGZDYSA-N; InChI=1/C6H10O6/c7-1-2-3(8)4(9)5(10)6(11)12-2/h2-5,7-10H,1H2/t2-,3-,4+,5-/m1/s1 Key: PHOQVHQSTUBQQK-SQOUGZDYBO
- SMILES: C([C@@H]1[C@H]([C@@H]([C@H](C(=O)O1)O)O)O)O

Properties
Chemical formula	C_{6}H_{10}O_{6}
Molar mass	178.140 g·mol^{−1}
Melting point	150–153 °C (302–307 °F; 423–426 K)
- Except where otherwise noted, data are given for materials in their standard state (at 25 °C [77 °F], 100 kPa). verify (what is ?) Infobox references

Glucono-δ-lactone (GDL), also known as gluconolactone, is an organic compound with the formula −CH(CH_{2}OH)(CHOH)_{3}C(O)O−. A colorless solid, it is an oxidized derivative of glucose.

It is typically produced by the aerobic oxidation of glucose in the presence of the enzyme glucose oxidase. The conversion cogenerates hydrogen peroxide, which is often the key product of the enzyme:

C_{6}H_{12}O_{6} + O_{2} → C_{6}H_{10}O_{6} + H_{2}O_{2}

Gluconolactone spontaneously hydrolyzes to gluconic acid:

C_{6}H_{10}O_{6} + H_{2}O → C_{6}H_{12}O_{7}

== Applications ==
Gluconolactone is a food additive with the E-number E575 used as a sequestrant, an acidifier, or a curing, pickling, or leavening agent. It is a lactone of D-gluconic acid. Pure GDL is a white odorless crystalline powder.

GDL has been marketed for use in feta cheese. GDL is pH-neutral, but hydrolyses in water to gluconic acid which is acidic, adding a tangy taste to foods, though it has roughly a third of the sourness of citric acid. It is metabolized to 6-phospho-D-gluconate; one gram of GDL yields roughly the same amount of metabolic energy as one gram of sugar.

Upon addition to water, GDL is partially hydrolysed to gluconic acid, with the balance between the lactone form and the acid form established as a chemical equilibrium. The rate of hydrolysis of GDL is increased by heat and high pH.

The yeast Maudiozyma bulderi can be used to ferment gluconolactone to ethanol and carbon dioxide. The pH value greatly affects culture growth. Gluconolactone at 1 or 2% in a mineral media solution causes the pH to drop below 3.

== See also ==
- Glucuronolactone
