= Minimed Paradigm =

Insulin pumps

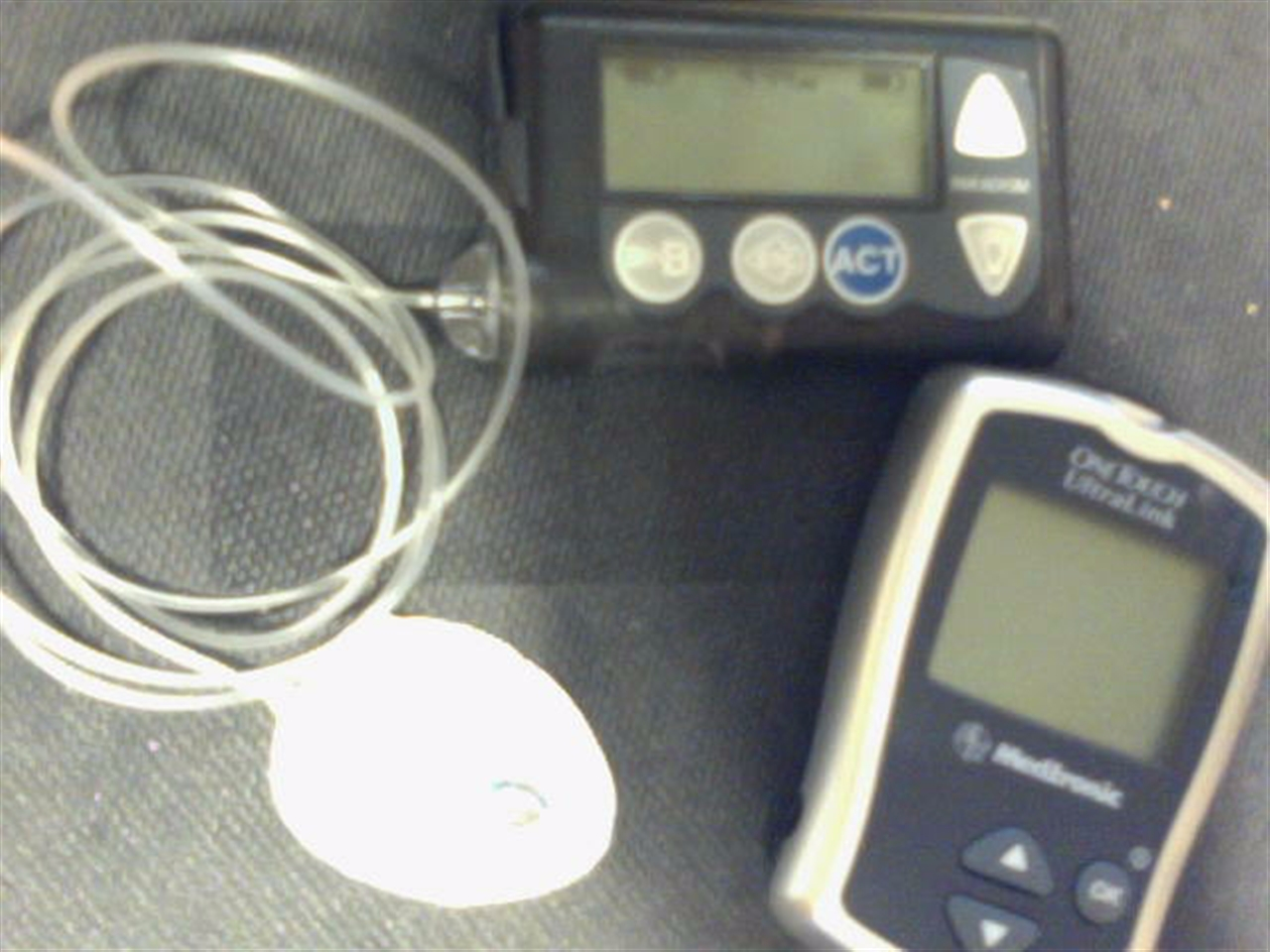
The Medtronic Minimed Paradigm 515 pump (RF receiver), Silhouette infusion set, and UltraLink blood sugar meter (RF transmitter)

MiniMed Paradigm is a series of insulin pumps manufactured by Medtronic for patients with diabetes mellitus. The pump operates with a single AAA battery and uses a piston-plunger pump to infuse a programmed amount of insulin into the patient through a length of tubing. The Paradigm uses a one-way wireless radio frequency link to receive blood sugar measurements from select glucose meters. The Paradigm RT (Real Time) series adds the ability to receive data from a mated continuous blood-glucose monitor. Although the pump can use these measurements to assist in calculating a dose of insulin, no actual change in insulin delivery occurs without manual user-intervention.

In the United States, the device is regulated by a branch of the Food and Drug Administration.

Medtronic's successor to the Paradigm, the 670G, was released in 2015. On the same platform, Medtronic released the 780G in 2020 and in the United States in 2023.

== Description ==
Pump and infusion set (catheter) placement

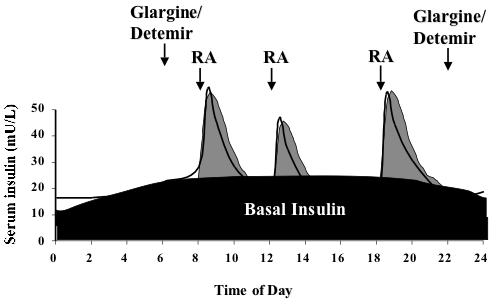
Insulin basal bolus profile

Insulin pumps are drug delivery devices used to treat patients with type 1 and type 2 diabetes. The Minimed Paradigm REAL-Time and Continuous Glucose Monitoring (CGM) system, which received FDA clearance in 2006, uses tubing and a reservoir with rapid-acting insulin. This "infusion set" is patient-connected via a catheter to the abdomen region. The infusion set can remain in the place for three days while the pump is clip-belt worn. There is a quick-disconnect feature for the tubing. The pump delivers insulin in two modes. In basal rate mode, the delivery is continuous in small doses similar to a pancreas, for example 0.15 units per hour throughout the day. Basal rates are set to meet individual metabolic rates. In bolus mode, the delivery is programmed to be a one-time delivery prior to eating or after an unexpected high, for example 18 units spread out to several hours. This type of continuous treatment is in contrast to traditional multiple daily injections (MDI) that use slower-acting insulin. Continuous treatment reduces glucose variability.

The Paradigm system consists of two basic parts: an insulin pump and an optional glucose sensor CGM worn for up to three days. The disposable sensor is subcutaneously-placed to make glucose measurements in interstitial fluid every five minutes and transmit the reading via low power radio frequency (ISM band) to the pump for realtime display. However, insulin therapy may be conducted without CGM and although there is not yet an automated insulin-regulation feedback mechanism between measure and infusion to control the amount and timing of insulin, this is clearly a future objective. Any change in basal or bolus is patient-driven by programming the pump using the Bolus Wizard. The latest model pumps are the MiniMed Paradigm 522 and 722, which differ in reservoir size, 176 versus 300 units, respectively. In 2007 the FDA approved a pediatric model for patients 7 to 17 years old.

== History ==
The development history of the Minimed pump goes back to the 1980s.

- 1983 – 1st Pump MiniMed 502 (Eli Lilly makes synthetic insulin)
- 1985 – MiniMed 504 Insulin Pump
- 1992 – Launch Of MiniMed 506 Insulin Pump
- 1996 – Introduction of MiniMed 507 Pump
- 1999 – Launch of the Model 507C
- 1999 – Introduction of MiniMed 508 Insulin Pump
- 2002 – Inauguration of the MiniMed Paradigm 511
- 2003 – 1st Wireless MiniMed Paradigm 512/712 (followed by 515/715)
- 2006 – MiniMed Paradigm REAL-Time 522/722
- 2010 – MiniMed Paradigm REAL-Time Revel 523/723

== FDA classification ==
The Food and Drug Administration has at least six classifications for the various parts of the Minimed Paradigm System.

Product code	Generic part name	Regulation number	Device classification code	Description
MDS	CGM	null	Premarket approval	Invasive glucose sensor
FMF	Drug reservoir	21CFR888.5860	standards	Piston syringe
NBW	Glucose meter	21CFR862.1345	standards	Glucose test system
LZG/FRN	Infusion/insulin pump	21CFR888.5725	standards	Infusion pump
FPA	Infusion set	21CFR888.5440	standards	Intravascular administration set
KZH	Infusion set insertion system	21CFR880.6920	standards	Syringer needle introducer

== Competitive devices ==
Competitive devices include Deltec Cozmo, Animas Ping, Tandem Diabetes Care, Inc., Insulet OmniPod, Accu-chek Spirit Combo, and Sooil DiabecareIIS.

== Future devices ==
Currently, Medtronic has the following research and development projects in its pipeline: Next Generation REAL-Time Continuous Glucose Monitoring System; Next Generation Insulin Pump; Pre-filled Insulin Reservoirs; Implantable Insulin Pump; and Artificial pancreas (Semi-Automated System & Closed-Loop System). The industry trend in portable devices has piggybacked on the success of wireless technology but not on the success of other disciplines, such as dynamical system, Cybernetics and adaptive systems, for root cause solutions

to close the "true" loop. While the slow-responding dynamics in the physiology of glucose regulation is not beyond the mathematics of PID controllers, 50 years of patient-perspective "advancement" says it is beyond the corporate, congressional, and lobbying leaders. Also, the accuracy of existing continuous glucose monitoring systems poses a problem for an artificial pancreas.
