= Dexcom G7 =

Medical device for Type 1 and Type 2 diabetes

- Dexcom G7 Applicator
- Type: Continuous glucose monitor
- Inventor: Dexcom, Inc
- Manufacturer: Dexcom, Inc
- Available: October 2022, United Kingdom, Ireland, Germany, Austria, and Hong Kong; February 17, 2023, United States; September 2024, Australia; 1 October 2024, New Zealand
- Current supplier: Dexcom, Inc
- Slogan: Powerful. Simple. Diabetes Management.; It's not magic, it just feels that way.

The Dexcom G7 is a series of Continuous glucose monitoring devices developed by Dexcom, Inc under the Dexcom CGM line. It replaces the previous Continuous glucose monitoring system known as the Dexcom G6. It was released on February 17, 2023 in the United States. The Dexcom G7 was released on September 2024 and was then subsidised through the National Diabetes Services Scheme on 1 March 2025 in Australia.

The device reads blood sugar and can be paired with the Omnipod 5.

Although it's claims that is has "accurate readings", the Dexcom G7 has had several FDA recalls, Complaints and other problems such as accuracy issues which is unknown why it happens.

== Description ==
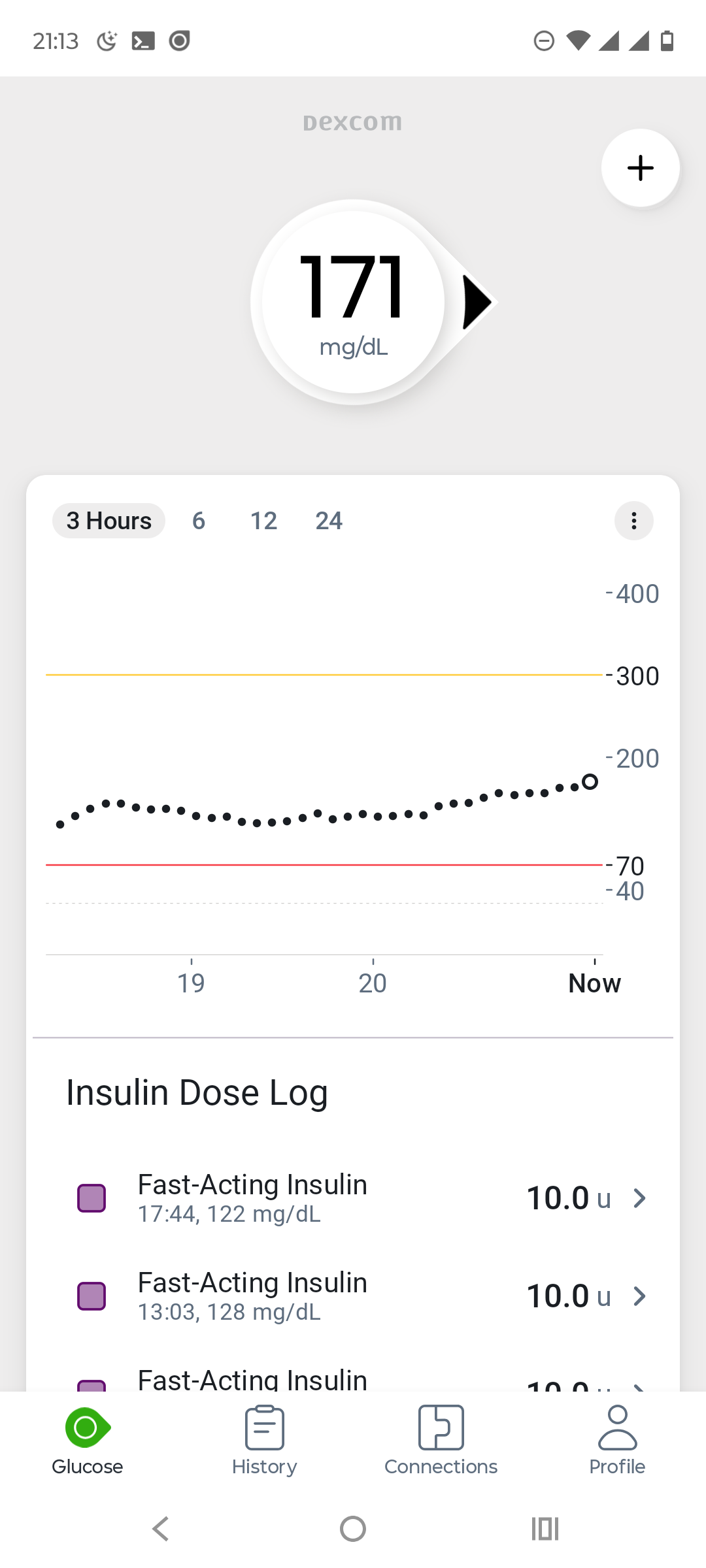
The Dexcom G7 App

The Dexcom G7 comes in a box with a applicator with the sensor device in it and with a lime green patch for the sensor. The applicator has a button on the side of it and with clear like barriers in the inside which if pushed on a surface, it allows the sensor device to be released when pressing the button. Each applicator will have a code on it to pair with the app. The App has graphs, important needs on the app, when the user is having low blood surger, the app will alarm to let the user know that they are having a low blood sugar problem.

== Release ==
The Dexcom G7 was first released in the United Kingdom, Ireland, Germany, Austria, and Hong Kong in October 2022. With availability in the United States beginning in February 2023. The Dexcom G7 was promoted through a Super Bowl advertisement in February 2023 for the release featuring Nick Jonas, a singer with type one diabetes who is a G7 user.

The Dexcom G7 was released on September 2024 in Australia and then was subsidised through the National Diabetes Services Scheme on 1 March 2025.

== Approval ==
In December 2022, the G7 received FDA approval.

On March 5, 2024, the Dexcom G7 15-Day Continuous Glucose Monitoring System was approved by the U.S. Food and Drug Administration for individuals aged 18 years and older with diabetes.

== Reception ==
The Dexcom G7 has a positive reception and reviews online on Type 1 and 2 Diabetes Facebook groups and on various websites talking about Type 1 diabetes and Type 2 diabetes. On Type Strong, Marck Lexter Chico says that 'One of the most notable improvements of the Dexcom G7 is its dramatically faster warm-up time. The G6 required a two-hour wait before it could provide accurate readings, but the Dexcom G7 only takes about 30 minutes to calibrate and begin providing glucose data. This means you can start using your CGM and receiving real-time insights much quicker—perfect for those who want to monitor their glucose levels sooner after applying the sensor'.
