= Dexcom CGM =

Line of continuous glucose monitors

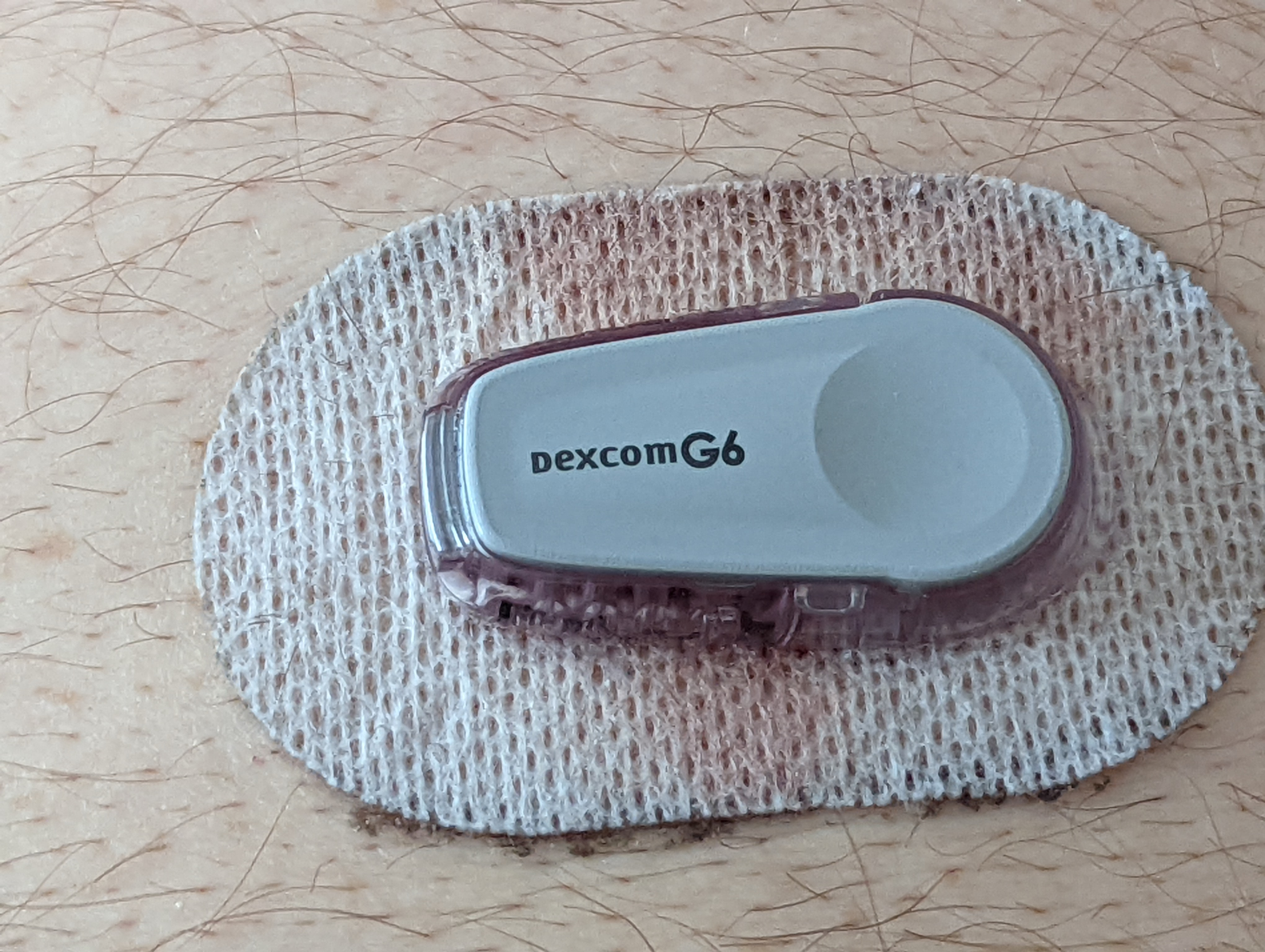
Dexcom G6

The Dexcom CGM is a continuous glucose monitoring system developed by Dexcom, Inc., a company specializing in glucose monitoring technology for individuals with diabetes. Several iterations of the Dexcom CGM wearable device have been released, beginning with the Dexcom Short-Term Sensor (STS), followed by the Dexcom Seven and Dexcom Seven Plus. Later models include the Dexcom G4, Dexcom G5, Dexcom G6, and Dexcom G7. The most recently released model, Stelo by Dexcom, is a more affordable option designed for individuals with type 2 diabetes.

Dexcom was founded in 1999 by John Burd and released its first CGM, the Dexcom STS, in 2006 following U.S. Food and Drug Administration (FDA) approval. As of 2025, only the Dexcom G6, Dexcom G7, and Stelo remain available.

== Devices ==
=== Early Dexcom CGMs ===
The Dexcom Short-Term Sensor, commonly abbreviated as STS, was a three-day continuous glucose monitor designed to provide real-time glucose readings to assist individuals with type 1 (insulin-dependent) diabetes in managing their blood sugar levels. The STS received approval from the FDA in March 2006.

The STS was considered valuable for trend information, but not sufficiently accurate for insulin dosage decisions. The original STS was discontinued in 2007 and 2008 following the release of an improved device, the Dexcom Seven.

The STS-7, better known as the Dexcom Seven, that was introduced to the market in 2007, was the first CGM system to provide a full seven-day wear time, reducing the frequency of sensor changes. Before the introduction of the Dexcom Seven, the company's primary research and development efforts had been focused on creating a fully implantable glucose sensor that could function continuously for periods ranging from one month to an entire year.

The Dexcom Seven Plus, the successor to the original Dexcom Seven, was released in 2010 after obtaining FDA approval earlier that year. The Seven Plus featured improvements in accuracy, and introduced low and high blood sugar alarms, enhancing the system's ability to alert users to potential hypoglycemia and hyperglycemia. Dexcom marketed the Seven Plus as the "GPS of the CGM world." Both the Dexcom Seven and the Dexcom Seven Plus were eventually rendered obsolete and had their FDA approvals withdrawn in 2015 as newer and more advanced Dexcom fCGM systems became available.

=== "New generation" Dexcom CGMs ===
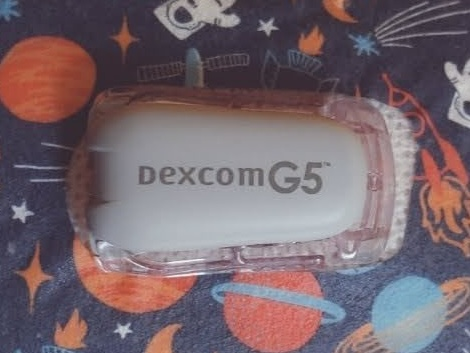
Dexcom G5

In 2012, Dexcom received regulatory approval for the Dexcom G4 Platinum, commonly referred to as the Dexcom G4. This device introduced several aesthetic customization options, including various color choices for the G4 receiver; featured an expanded wireless transmission range of up to twenty feet without obstruction—an improvement over previous continuous glucose monitors; and had improved accuracy, especially during hypoglycemic episodes. In 2014, the G4 was approved for pediatric use, thereby extending its applicability to younger patients.

In 2015, the Dexcom G5 was introduced. The G5 provided blood glucose readings at five‐minute intervals and was the first device in the Dexcom CGM series to offer direct compatibility with a mobile application. This advancement allowed users to view glucose data on their smartphones, share information via the Dexcom Share app, and track long‐term trends using the Dexcom Clarity app. Both the Dexcom G4 Platinum and the Dexcom G5 were discontinued at the end of 2020.

=== Modern CGMs ===
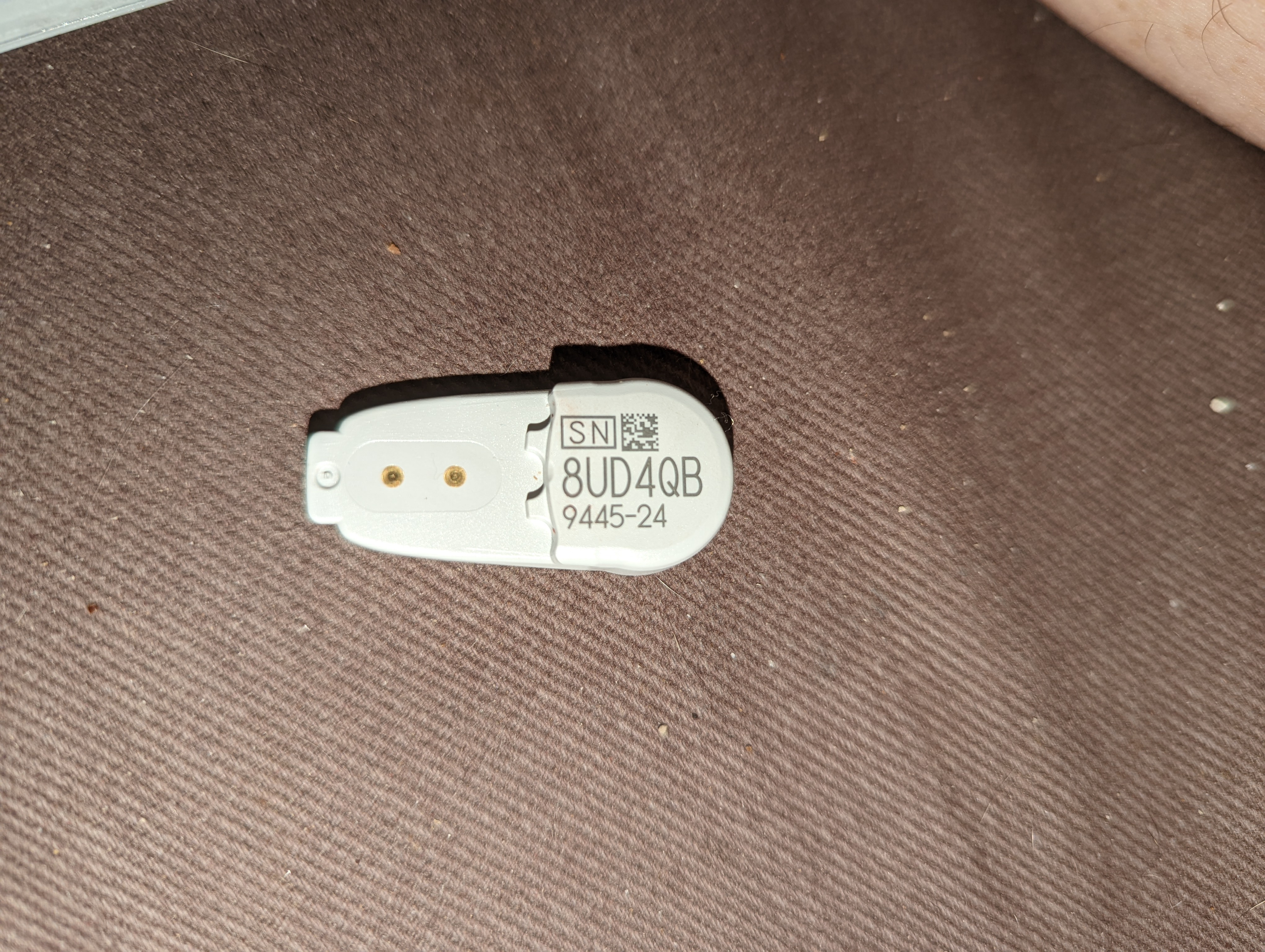
Dexcom G6 transmitter

In 2018, the FDA approved the Dexcom G6 for use as a stand-alone CGM, and for integration with compatible insulin pumps, making it the first continuous glucose monitor capable of direct integration with insulin pumps. (Note: With the release of the G6, the FDA created a new category of devices, "Integrated Continuous Glucose Monitors" (iCGM). This simplified the approval process for devices that could integrated with the G6.) The G6 was also the first CGM to operate without the need for calibrations, removing the requirement for routine fingerstick blood tests. However, actual blood glucose levels can differ from the levels reported by the CGM. The difference is primarily due to the location of the Dexcom sensor in the subcutaneous space. The sugar level there lags behind the actual changes in the bloodstream. The device retained compatibility with Dexcom's existing mobile applications, including Dexcom Share, which allows users to share glucose data with others, and Dexcom Clarity, which provides long-term trend analysis and reports. As of 2025, the Dexcom G6 remains available. In addition, while previous Dexcom CGMs were compatible only with Tandem insulin pumps, the G6 expanded its integration to the Omnipod 5 system.

=== Dexcom G7 and Stelo ===
The Dexcom G7 brought several design and functionality changes, receiving multiple design awards for its updated form factor and features. The G7 introduced direct smartwatch connectivity, making it the first Dexcom CGM compatible with the Apple Watch without requiring an intermediary smartphone connection. Like the previous G6 the G7 continues its integration with the Omnipod 5 system.

The G7 was first released in the United Kingdom, Ireland, Germany, Austria, and Hong Kong in October 2022. In December 2022, the G7 received FDA approval, with availability in the United States beginning in February 2023. The G7's launch was promoted through a Super Bowl advertisement featuring Nick Jonas, a singer with type one diabetes who is a G7 user.

On March 5, 2024, the Dexcom G7 15-Day Continuous Glucose Monitoring System was approved by the U.S. Food and Drug Administration for individuals aged 18 years and older with diabetes. This version of the G7 extends the sensor wear time from 10.5 to 15.5 days and features a slightly improved mean absolute relative difference of 8.0%, compared to the original G7’s 8.2%. The system provides real-time glucose readings every five minutes via the Dexcom G7 app and includes a 12-hour grace period for sensor replacement.

In the summer of 2024, Dexcom introduced Stelo by Dexcom, a CGM similar to the G7 but with modified features and alarm settings. Stelo is intended for adult individuals who do not require insulin therapy or frequent low blood sugar alerts, differentiating it from other Dexcom CGMs designed for insulin-dependent users. Unlike other Dexcom models, Stelo is available over the counter and does not require a prescription. As of December 1, 2025, both the Dexcom G7 15-Day; G7 and Stelo are available in the U.S. market, only the G7 and Stelo are available internationally.

== Components ==
Each generation of the Dexcom CGM system has consisted of two primary components: the sensor and the transmitter. The sensor is a thin wire that is inserted into the subcutaneous tissue, where it measures interstitial glucose levels. The transmitter is a small electronic device that attaches to the sensor and wirelessly transmits the glucose data to a compatible receiver, smartphone, or other monitoring device, allowing users to view their glucose readings in real time. The Dexcom G7 was the first Dexcom CGM to have an all-in-one sensor and transmitter. In addition to the sensor and transmitter, Dexcom CGM systems also include an applicator, which is the device used to insert the sensor into the tissue. Blood glucose readings are viewed on a device-specific receiver or modern systems via a smartphone application.

=== Sensor ===
The Dexcom sensor operates as an implantable electrochemical device that continuously measures glucose levels in the interstitial fluid beneath the skin. It consists of a non-conductive body housing three electrodes: a working electrode that reacts with glucose, a reference electrode that maintains a constant voltage, and a counter electrode that completes the electrical circuit. The counter electrode is designed with a larger reactive surface area to enhance measurement accuracy. These components are inserted into the subcutaneous tissue using an applicator. A multi-layer membrane covers the electrodes, regulating the diffusion of substances to the sensor and promoting stable, reliable readings. The resulting electrical signal is transmitted by the Dexcom transmitter to a compatible receiver or smart device for real-time glucose monitoring.

Until the release of the Dexcom G7 and Stelo, the sensor and transmitter were separate components, with the transmitter snapping into the sensor. However, the G7 and Stelo models integrate both the sensor and transmitter into a single, disposable system.

=== Transmitter ===
The transmitter is the component of the Dexcom CGM system that is responsible for sending glucose data from the sensor to a compatible receiver, smartphone, or other monitoring device via Bluetooth, allowing users to view real-time glucose readings. Throughout previous iterations of the Dexcom CGM, the transmitter has typically been shaped like a pear. The Dexcom G7 and Stelo models feature a smaller, rounder design and integrate the sensor and transmitter into a single, disposable system.

=== Applicator ===
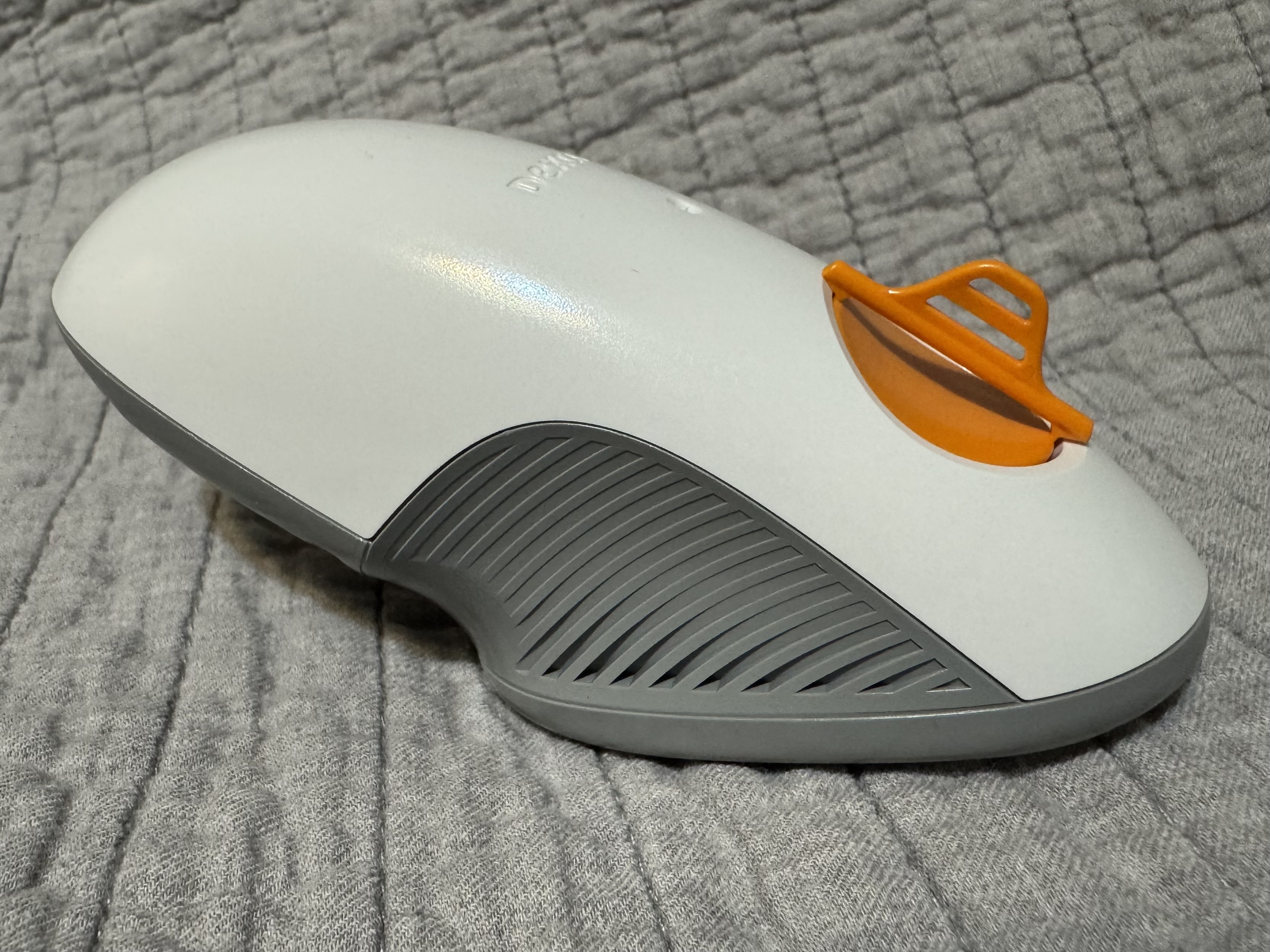
Dexcom G6 applicator

Before the release of the Dexcom G6, users of the Dexcom CGM system had to manually insert the sensor using a syringe-like applicator. This process was often painful, error-prone, and involved multiple steps, requiring up to 11 actions to complete the sensor insertion. As a result, the process was cumbersome and uncomfortable for many users.

With the release of the G6 auto-applicator, the design was significantly improved. The updated applicator features a one-touch, one-hand operation, simplifying the process and reducing the steps from eleven to four. It also utilizes a fast needle mechanism that quickly moves in and out of the skin, minimizing discomfort and making the insertion nearly painless. This redesign made the process easier and more accessible, particularly for parents using the system with young children.

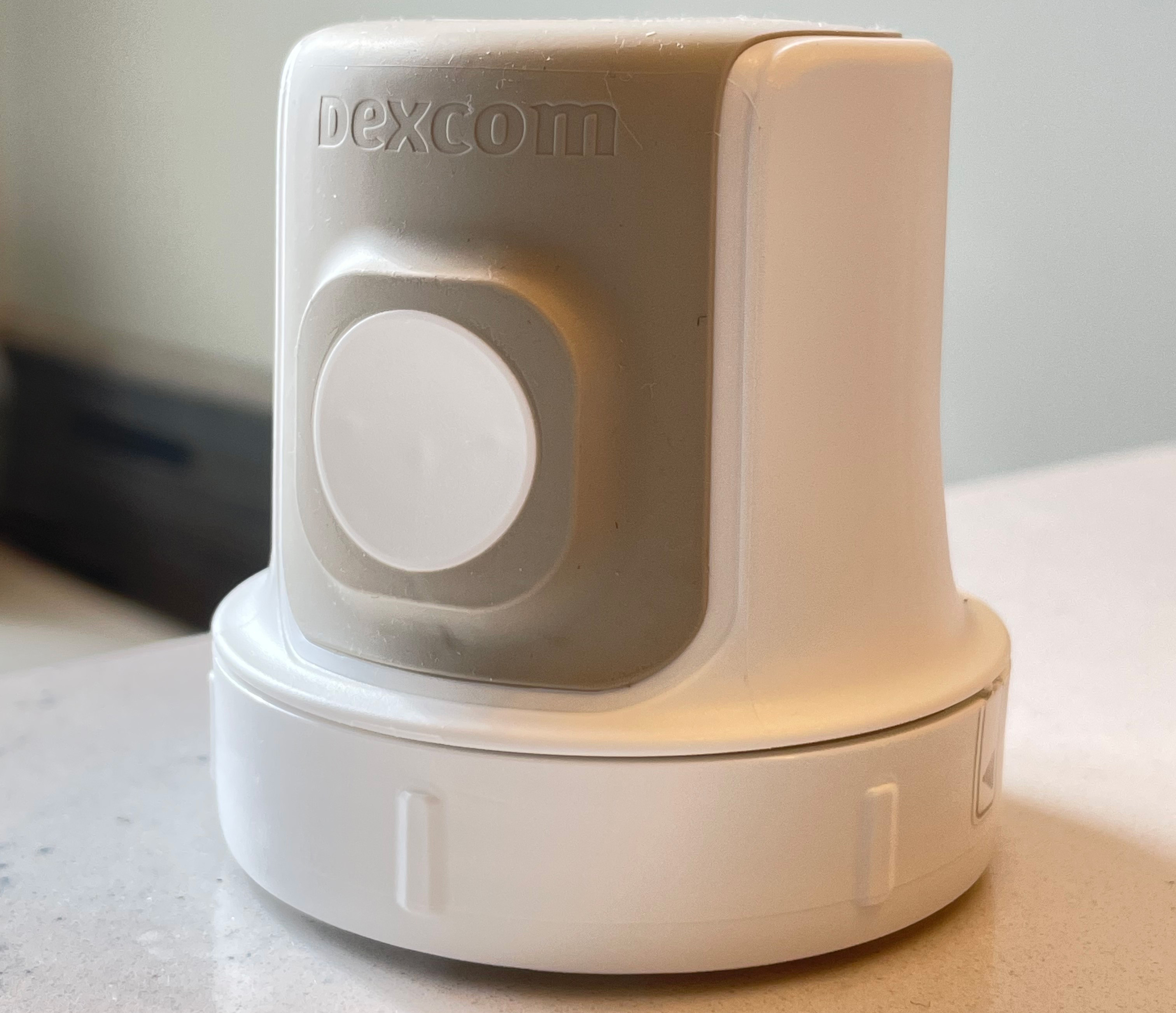
Dexcom G7 applicator

The Dexcom G7 also has an auto-injecting applicator that can be operated with one hand. The G7 applicator applies the sensor-transmitter as a single wearable unit, unlike the G6, which required the transmitter be snapped in after the sensor was inserted. The G7 applicator is smaller and utilizes a magnet sensor to initiate the sensor initiation period before starting the sensor with the phone or receiver. Some G7 users report re-purposing the magnets inside the applicator rather than throwing them away.

=== Receiver ===
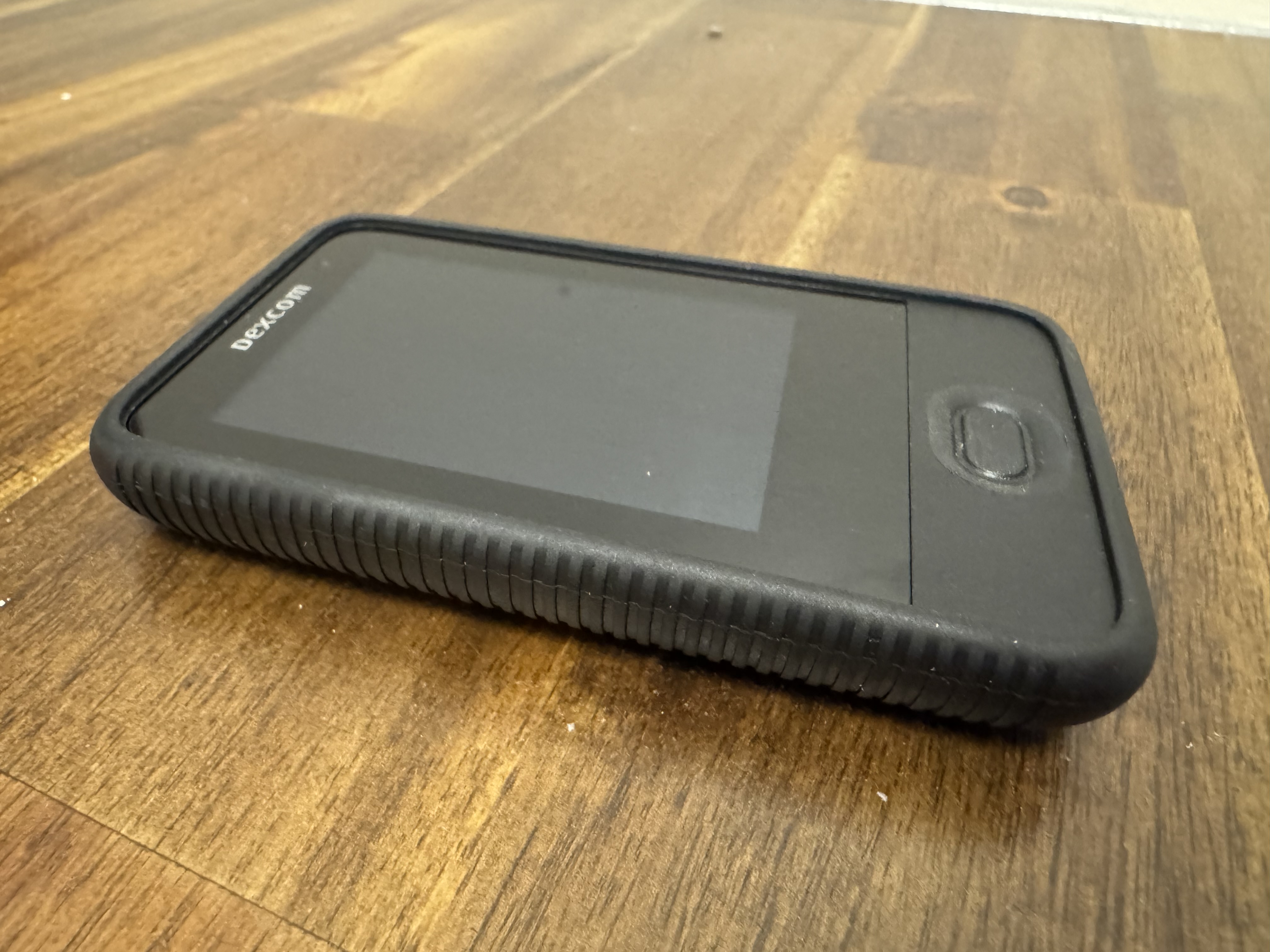
Dexcom G6 receiver

The Dexcom receiver is a compatible display device used to view automatic glucose readings from Dexcom continuous glucose monitoring systems. It may be used as an alternative to, or in conjunction with, a compatible smartphone. Over the years, multiple versions of Dexcom receivers have been released, varying in design and functionality. Earlier models were powered by replaceable batteries, while more recent versions, including the Dexcom G7 receiver, feature rechargeable batteries.

== Apps ==
=== Dexcom ===
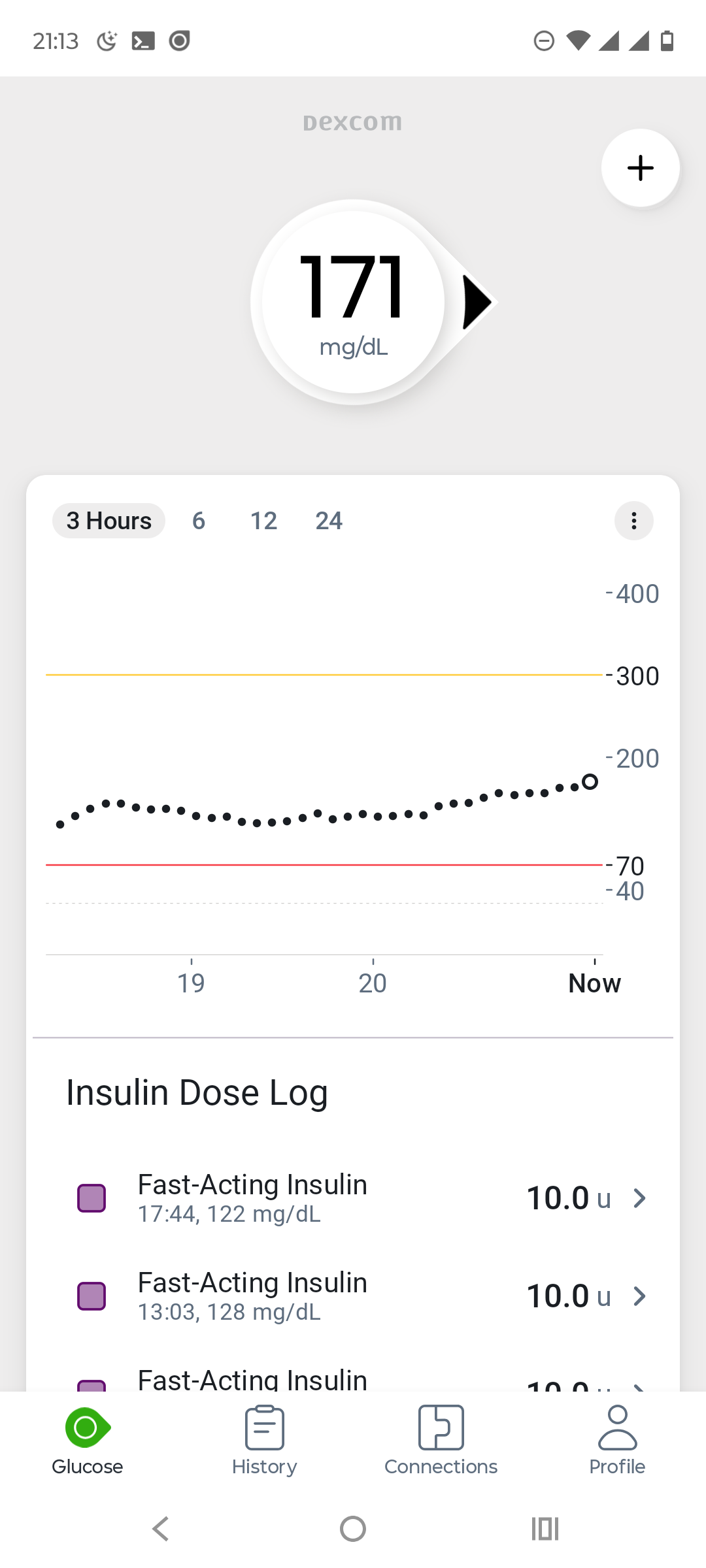
Screenshot of Dexcom G7 App running on an Android smartphone

The Dexcom G5 was the first Dexcom continuous glucose monitor to be compatible with a mobile application. The accompanying app, named "Dexcom G5," allowed users to view their blood glucose readings on a smartphone and, with an intermediary iPhone, on an Apple Watch. The app remained available until the discontinuation of the Dexcom G5, at which point it was removed from app stores.

The Dexcom G6 continued this functionality with its own dedicated application, "Dexcom G6," which provided real-time glucose readings and data-sharing capabilities.

Upon the release of the Dexcom G7, a new application, "Dexcom G7," was introduced to support the updated system. The Dexcom G7 app is also available as the first system that connects directly to a smart watch.

The Stelo by Dexcom also has an app which is similar to that of the G7, but has slightly different options.

=== Follow ===
The Dexcom Follow app is a mobile application that enables up to ten individuals to remotely monitor a user's blood glucose levels through a feature known as "Share." This app was released alongside the Dexcom G5 in 2015. The Dexcom Follow app is compatible with the Dexcom G6 and G7 systems.

=== Clarity ===
Dexcom Clarity is a diabetes management software and mobile application that allows users to view, analyze, and share their Dexcom CGM data. It displays glucose data through various visual reports and graphs, helping users recognize key trends and patterns, such as nighttime highs or lows, that are important for optimizing diabetes care.

In addition to mobile and desktop access, Dexcom Clarity offers a clinic portal for healthcare providers, allowing them to remotely access and review patient data. The software generates several types of reports, including summaries of key statistics, analyses of glucose patterns, and trend graphs that can be customized and filtered for detailed examination.

== Accuracy ==
CGMs do not always produce readings identical to fingerstick blood glucose tests due to a lag between interstitial and blood glucose levels, especially during rapid changes. Differences of up to 20% are considered normal. The Dexcom G6 and G7 CGMs allows for user calibration based on their fingerstick blood glucose readings if needed. CGM readings are most accurate when glucose levels are stable.

=== MARD ===
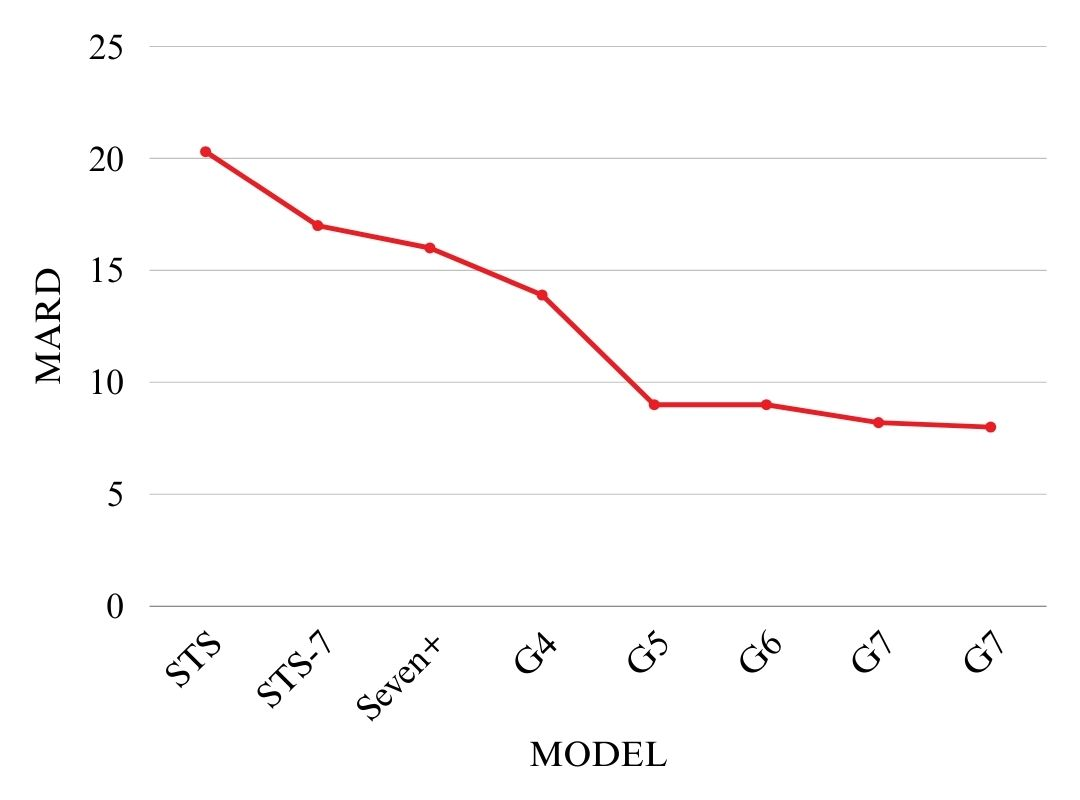
Dexcom MARD by model

Mean Absolute Relative Difference (MARD) is a standard metric used to evaluate the accuracy of continuous glucose monitoring systems, which gives the average amount a CGM sensor reading varies from the actual blood glucose. It is calculated by taking the average of the absolute relative differences between the glucose readings reported by the CGM system and corresponding reference measurements, typically obtained through laboratory analysis or blood glucose meters. A lower MARD value indicates greater accuracy, and it is commonly used in clinical research and regulatory evaluations to compare the performance of different CGM devices. It is also of note that MARD percentages can vary by person, even while using the same device.

The accuracy of Dexcom CGM systems has steadily improved over time, as reflected in declining MARD values across successive generations. The original Dexcom STS, released in 2006, had a MARD of approximately 20.3%, while the Dexcom Seven, introduced in 2007, reduced this to around 17%. The Seven Plus had a slightly lower MARD of 16%. The G4 Platinum, launched in 2012, further improved accuracy with a MARD of 13.9%, followed by the G5 Mobile in 2015, which achieved 9%—the first Dexcom system to reach single-digit accuracy. in some users, however it also was found to be as high as 15%. The Dexcom G6, released in 2018, was similarly marketed with a MARD of 9%, although some studies found values exceeding 12% in certain individuals. The most recent model, the Dexcom G7, features a redesigned sensor and updated algorithm, yielding a MARD of 8.2% in adults and 8.1% in children. The newest iteration of the Dexcom CGM, the Dexcom G7 15-Day CGM, has an even lower MARD of 8% in adult users.

=== Calibration ===
Continuous glucose monitoring systems do not always produce readings identical to those obtained through fingerstick blood glucose testing. Differences between CGM and fingerstick values are expected due to physiological and technical factors, including the lag time between glucose levels in interstitial fluid and those in capillary blood. While the Dexcom G7 has a reported MARD of approximately 8.2%, variations of up to 20% between CGM and fingerstick readings are considered within the normal accuracy range. These differences are particularly noticeable during periods of rapid glucose change, such as after meals, physical activity, or insulin administration. As a result, CGM readings are most reliable when glucose levels are stable, and discrepancies may occur during times of fluctuation.

There is an option to calibrate using a blood glucose reading taken from another device such as a blood glucose meter that uses a fingerstick lancing device, but it is not mandatory on any currently available Dexcom CGMs. The "20 rule" (or 20/20 rule) is commonly used to assess the accuracy of the CGM. If the difference between the Dexcom G6 or G7 reading and the fingerstick blood glucose meter value is within 20% (or 20 mg/dL when glucose levels are under 80 mg/dL), the sensor is operating within its expected error margin. While CGM and meter readings may not match exactly, they should generally fall within this acceptable range, especially when glucose levels are stable.

== Clinical studies ==
Randomized trials have evaluated Dexcom systems as part of real-time CGM-based diabetes management. In the 2020 MILLENNIALS crossover trial, participants aged 16–24 years with type 1 diabetes used the Dexcom G6 for eight weeks and conventional self-monitoring of blood glucose for eight weeks. During G6 use, the mean percentage of time in the target glucose range of 70–180 mg/dL was 35.7%, compared with 24.6% during self-monitoring, and mean glycated hemoglobin (HbA1c) was 0.76 percentage points lower.

The 2021 MOBILE trial randomly assigned 175 adults with poorly controlled type 2 diabetes, treated with basal insulin but not mealtime insulin, to use either the G6 or a conventional blood glucose meter for eight months. HbA1c decreased by 1.1 percentage points in the G6 group and by 0.6 points in the meter group; after adjustment, the between-group difference was 0.4 percentage points. Mean time in the 70–180 mg/dL range was 59% with the G6 and 43% with meter monitoring, while one participant in each group experienced severe hypoglycemia. The study and devices were funded by Dexcom, and a Dexcom employee was among the authors. Both trials compared a CGM-enabled management strategy with fingerstick-based monitoring; they did not compare the G6 with another CGM system.

== Safety and regulatory actions ==
In March 2025, the FDA issued Dexcom a warning letter following inspections of facilities that manufactured G6 and G7 sensors. The agency said the devices were adulterated because manufacturing methods and controls did not conform to federal quality-system requirements. The letter cited inadequate process monitoring and validation, deficiencies in design controls and risk analysis—including risks associated with automated insulin delivery—and commercial distribution of sensors after major manufacturing changes without a required new premarket notification.

In 2025, Dexcom recalled certain G6, G7, ONE, and ONE+ receivers because a speaker malfunction could prevent audible alerts for dangerously high or low glucose. The FDA classified the action as the most serious type of recall and reported at least 56 injuries and no deaths. Affected users were advised to check their receiver, request a replacement, and test its speaker whenever it was charged.

In May 2026, Dexcom announced that G7 sensors from two lots which had been designated as scrap were stolen during disposal and sold by third parties. The company said one lot included sensors that were not properly sterilized, increasing the risk of skin infection, while the other had an elevated internal-testing failure rate and an increased risk of producing no readings. Dexcom advised users not to use sensors from the two lots and offered replacements; at the time of the announcement, no severe adverse events had been reported.

== Hybrid closed-loop systems ==
Hybrid closed-loop (HCL) systems, also known as automated insulin delivery (AID) systems, are medical technologies designed to assist individuals with diabetes in regulating blood glucose levels. These systems integrate a continuous glucose monitor (CGM), an insulin pump, and a control algorithm to automatically adjust basal insulin delivery and, in some systems, administer correction boluses. The term "hybrid" refers to the fact that while the system automates many aspects of insulin dosing, users are still required to manually input carbohydrate intake and manually administer bolus doses for meals. HCL systems aim to maintain glucose levels within a target range and reduce the frequency and severity of hypoglycemia and hyperglycemia.

Research and development of HCL systems began in the early 2000s, with efforts such as the Advanced Insulin Infusion Using a Control Loop (ADICOL) project. A 2008 clinical trial by Weinzimer et al. demonstrated that hybrid closed-loop therapy significantly improved overnight glucose control compared to conventional insulin delivery. The first HCL system to receive regulatory approval was the MiniMed 670G (Medtronic) in 2016. Since then, other systems—including the MiniMed 770G and 780G, Tandem t:slim X2 with Control-IQ, and CamAPS FX—have also been introduced, employing various algorithmic strategies such as model predictive control (MPC), proportional-integral-derivative (PID) control, and fuzzy logic.

The Dexcom G6 and G7 can integrate with the Tandem t:slim X2, the Tandem Mobi, the Omnipod 5, and the Beta Bionics iLet insulin pumps.

=== Dexcom CGM-compatible insulin pumps ===
==== Tandem t:slim X2 ====
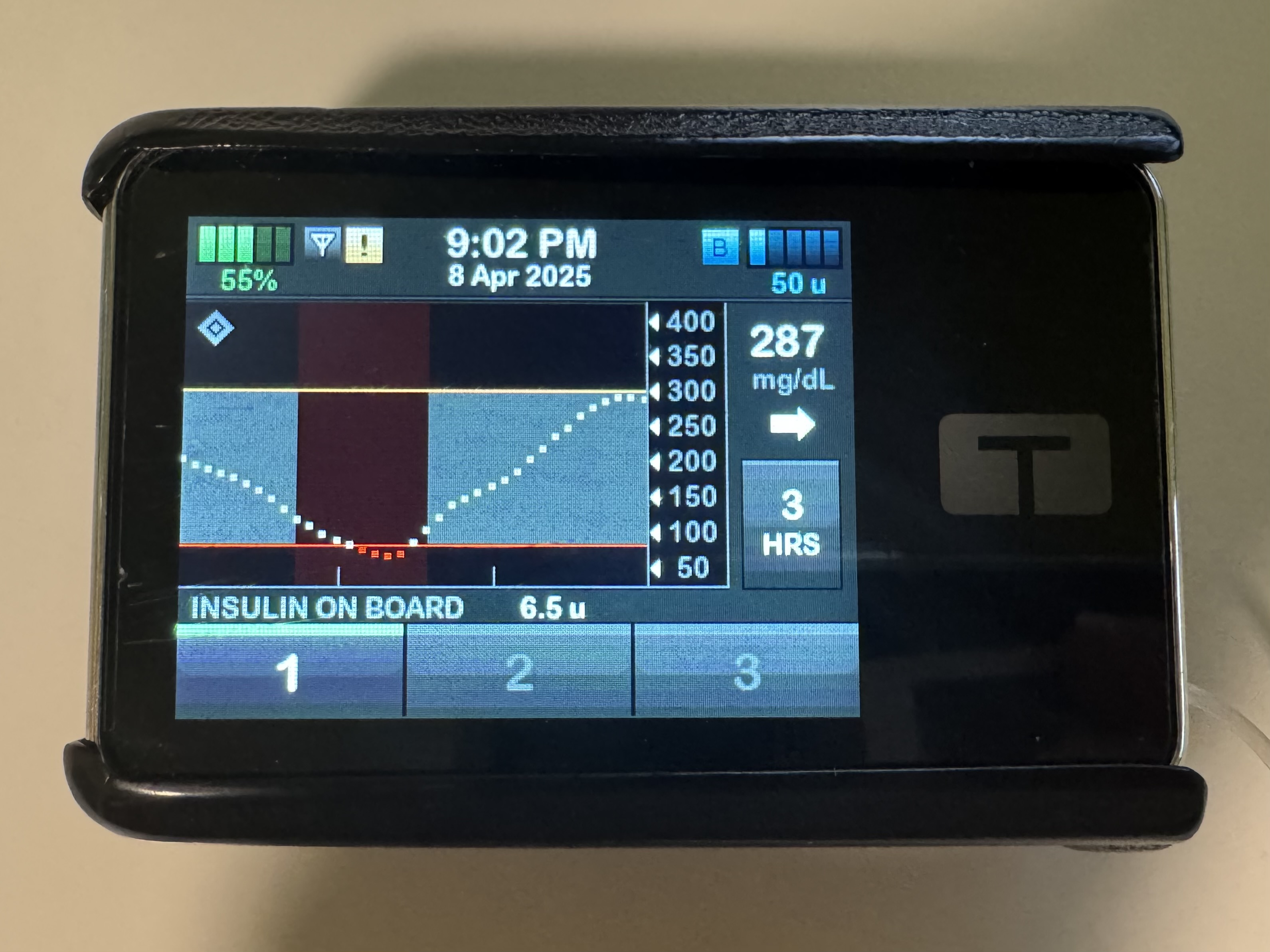
A Tandem t:slim X2 insulin pump with Control-IQ

The Tandem t:slim X2 insulin pump, made by Tandem Diabetes, can be integrated with the Dexcom G6 or Dexcom G7 Continuous Glucose Monitoring Systems to automate glucose regulation. Using real-time glucose data from the CGM, the t:slim X2 uses an algorithm to adjust insulin delivery based on these readings, helping to prevent glucose highs and lows. This integration enables more flexible management of blood sugar levels throughout the day.

The t:slim X2 uses two predictive technologies when connected to the Dexcom CGM: Control-IQ and Basal-IQ. Control-IQ is a hybrid closed-loop system that predicts glucose levels up to 30 minutes in advance using Dexcom CGM data. It adjusts basal insulin delivery by increasing, decreasing, or halting insulin delivery as needed to maintain glucose levels within a target range. Additionally, Control-IQ can automatically administer up to one correction bolus per hour if glucose levels are expected to rise. Basal-IQ also uses Dexcom G6 data to predict glucose trends but primarily focuses on preventing lows. It stops insulin delivery if glucose is expected to drop below 4.4 mmol/L (72 mg/dL) and resumes delivery once glucose levels rise. However, Basal-IQ does not administer correction boluses or adjust insulin for elevated glucose levels.

==== Tandem Mobi ====
The Tandem Mobi system is an automated insulin delivery AID system developed by Tandem Diabetes Care. It is powered by Control‑IQ+ technology (commercially launched in March 2025) which utilizes continuous glucose monitoring CGM sensor data to predict glucose levels 30 minutes in advance and adjust insulin delivery accordingly. The system can automatically deliver correction boluses, a feature referred to as AutoBolus, to help reduce the risk of hyperglycemia. Tandem Mobi is the only AID system that allows full control through a compatible mobile application, including on iPhone devices.

==== Omnipod 5 ====
The Omnipod 5, manufactured by Insulet, is a tubeless insulin pump system that can be integrated with the Dexcom G6 and G7 systems to provide automated glucose control. The system was released in the US in June 2024. Users can control the system through the Omnipod 5 Controller or a compatible Android smartphone. Omnipod 5 App for iPhone is expected to be released in the first half of 2025. The system allows for a simplified pairing process through a QR code scan and features a shortened 30-minute CGM warm-up period, compared to the Dexcom G6, enabling more time spent in Automated Mode. The system uses real-time glucose data to adjust insulin delivery.

==== iLet Bionic Pancreas ====
The iLet Bionic Pancreas system, developed by Beta Bionics, is an automated insulin delivery system comprising the iLet ACE Pump, the iLet Dosing Decision Software, and a compatible continuous glucose monitor — either the Dexcom G6/G7 or the FreeStyle Libre 3 Plus sensor. The system is designed to automate insulin dosing with minimal user input, relying solely on the user’s body weight for initialization. It utilizes three algorithms to manage insulin delivery: a basal insulin controller, which adjusts basal rates every five minutes based on current glucose values, glucose trends, and historical CGM data; a bolus correction controller, which incorporates insulin on board in addition to these factors to calculate correction doses; and a meal announcement controller, which determines bolus doses according to the user’s estimation of meal size. The system does not require user-programmed basal rates, insulin-to-carbohydrate ratios, or correction factors. It supports three glucose targets—110, 120, or 130 mg/dL—and is approved for use in individuals aged six years and older with type 1 diabetes.

=== Dexcom-compatible AID applications ===
==== CamAPS FX ====
CamAPS FX, a product of CamDiab Ltd, is a mobile app designed for individuals with type 1 diabetes. It operates in conjunction with various insulin pumps, including the mylife YpsoPump, DANA Diabecare RS, and DANA-i insulin pumps, and is compatible with continuous glucose monitoring systems such as the Dexcom G6 and Abbott FreeStyle Libre 3. The system utilizes a self-learning algorithm that adapts insulin delivery based on glucose data, adjusting every 8–12 minutes, and it is approved for use in individuals aged one year and older, with age requirements varying depending on the CGM system used.

CamAPS FX is controlled via a smartphone app, currently available for Android devices, with iOS support in development. The app allows users to set personalized glucose targets and offers features like "Ease-off" and "Boost" modes to adjust insulin needs, as well as a "Slowly absorbed meal" function for managing the effects of high-fat or low-glycemic meals. Remote monitoring capabilities are included through app-based sharing and SMS alerts. The system’s algorithm, developed at the University of Cambridge, has been validated in multiple clinical trials, showing consistent improvements in glycemic control and quality of life.

==== Diabeloop ====
Diabeloop is an automated insulin delivery system that integrates an algorithm called DBLG1 for loop mode, combining insulin delivery with continuous glucose monitoring to maintain glucose control. The system features an all-in-one controller that manages the pump, CGM, and loop mode functionality. It ensures secure data transmission via encrypted Bluetooth and is hosted on Health Data System (HDS)-accredited servers in compliance with French health regulations. The DBLG1 system also offers configurable alerts with vibration mode and adjustable volume settings for both day and night. The Kaleido pump, compatible with DBLG1, is waterproof, removable, and rechargeable, providing up to three days of use and can be fully recharged in two hours. The Diabeloop system uses the Dexcom G6.

== Smart insulin pen compatibility ==
A smart insulin pen is a reusable injector pen designed to assist people with diabetes in managing insulin delivery more effectively. This system is paired with a smartphone app that calculates and tracks insulin doses, providing reminders, alerts, and reports to ensure better diabetes management. Some smart insulin pens are capable of integrating with Dexcom continuous glucose monitoring data, enabling users to make more informed decisions based on real-time glucose levels. These pens can be either an add-on to an existing insulin pen or a standalone reusable device that uses prefilled cartridges instead of vials or disposable pens.

=== InPen ===
The InPen is a reusable, bluetooth-enabled insulin pen, manufactured by Medtronic, that can connect to Dexcom CGM systems. The InPen can connect to the G6 and G7 through the InPen app, the Apple iPhone's Heath app, and on the Apple Watch.

=== Lilly's Tempo Pen ===
Eli Lilly's Tempo system is a diabetes management platform that includes the Tempo Pen, Tempo Smart Button, and the TempoSmart App. The Tempo Pen is a reusable insulin pen that, when paired with the Tempo Smart Button, captures and transmits insulin dose data to the TempoSmart App via Bluetooth. The TempoSmart App can integrate glucose data from compatible devices, such as the Tempo Blood Glucose Meter or Dexcom G7, allowing users to track their insulin doses, glucose levels, and other lifestyle data in one place. The app also includes features such as bolus insulin dose calculation, medication reminders, digital logbooks, trend reports, and diabetes education tools.
