= Robin Koops =

Dutch inventor

- Born: 1971 (age 54–55); Goor, Netherlands
- Education: Mechanical engineering
- Scientific career
- Fields: Medicine

Robin Koops (born 1971) is a Dutch mechanical engineer, designer and inventor. He is known for developing an artificial pancreas.

== Early career ==
Koops is the son of a metalworker from Stork. He went to the Middelbare Technische School (MTS), a technical school and form of vocational education. He started his career as a designer for the meat packing industry. Next to general appliances he designed schnitzel flatteners, machines to remove the clips from sausages after drying, and machinery to create a cross carving on beef.

== Development of the artificial pancreas ==
=== Diabetes diagnosis ===
In 1998 Koops was diagnosed with diabetes type 1 The disease forces patients to continuously pay attention to their body, or suffer serious consequences. Koops found this very inconvenient, and began to think of a mechanical replacement for his failing pancreas in about 1994. After he found that no patents existed for such a machine, he started a new career as an inventor. This was in about 2004. He founded the company Inreda Diabetic, which develops the Inreda AP.

=== Automated insulin delivery system and artificial pancreas ===
Automated insulin delivery systems that were available up to 2020, consist of three distinct components: a continuous glucose monitor to determine blood sugar levels, a pump to deliver insulin, and an algorithm that uses the data from the CGM to send commands to the pump.

The Artificial Pancreas differs from Automated insulin delivery systems by also having a pump for glucagon. This makes that it far better resembles a pancreas than an automated insulin delivery system that only delivers insulin.

== Inreda Diabetic ==
Koops started to develop his artificial pancreas (AP) in 2004. In 2007 the Dutch Diabetes Fonds (Diabetic Fund) started to support and finance his work. In 2010 the Academic Medical Center (Amsterdam) in Amsterdam received 10.5 million euros from the European Union for development of the AP. In 2011 clinical studies started.

In 2019 Koops and his company Inreda Diabetic received the Nationaal Icoon (national icon) prize, a yearly prize awarded by the Ministry of Economic Affairs and entrepreneurial organizations for innovative companies.

Apart from safety, usability is paramount for the AP. The first prototype looked like a rollator. It had wheels, a programmable logic controller and two built in laptops. In 2010 a wearable prototype, the size of a backpack was made. The next prototype was the size of a box on the user's belt.

In 2021 a prototype of Inreda's artificial pancreas was included in the collection of science museum Boerhaave in Leiden. It is placed next to the Artificial kidney, developed by Willem Johan Kolff. This was also remarkable because Koops was inspired by Kolff's story when visiting the museum.

== Inreda AP ==
=== CE marking ===
The artificial pancreas developed by Inreda Diabetic is called the Inreda AP. In February 2020 Inreda Diabetic received the CE marking for the Inreda AP, which guarantees safety. After the CE marking came in, steps were taken to further reduce size, to scale up production, and to set up training and customer service. Meanwhile, research on the AP continues.

The Inreda AP, as used in 2020, has two sensors. The sensors are a challenging part of an automated insulin delivery system or AP. The two sensors of the Inreda AP are exactly the same, and allow a measurement and a check of this measurement. In case of two differing measurements, the wearer has to check his blood the old way in order to determine which sensor is correct. Another reason to use two sensors, is that a sensor has to be replaced every week, and requires twelve hours to adjust, two of them are used. This measure allows a new sensor the time to adjust, and allows detection of problems.

=== In use with 100 patients ===
In October 2020 the health insurance company Menzis and Inreda started a pilot with 100 patients insured by Menzis, who use the AP instead of the traditional treatment.

=== General availability ===
The process to determine whether the Inreda AP should be included in the Dutch health insurance coverage is lengthy. In July 2021 the University Medical Center Utrecht was awarded 10 million euros to investigate (primarily) the cost efficiency of the AP. This investigation is expected to be completed in 2023, making that Dutch health insurance will not make the Inreda AP generally available before August 2024. The parties involved made it clear that patients could not volunteer for this investigation.

== Awards ==
In 2019 Koops and his company Inreda Diabetic received the Nationaal Icoon (translation: National Icon) prize, awarded each year by the Ministry of Economic Affairs and entrepreneurial organizations for innovative companies. Furthermore, Robin Koops was awarded the 2024 Willem Kolff prize.
