= Artificial pancreas (disambiguation) =

Artificial pancreas may refer to any of the various technologies that seek to replicate the endocrine functions of the pancreas:

- Automated insulin delivery systems, the most common meaning of "artificial pancreas" as diabetes mellitus is the most common disease of pancreatic dysfunction
- Pancreatic islet cell replacement technologies, including those designed to eliminate the requirement for immunosuppression in patients who receive islet cell transplants
- Automated glucose clamps
