= MiniMed 780G =

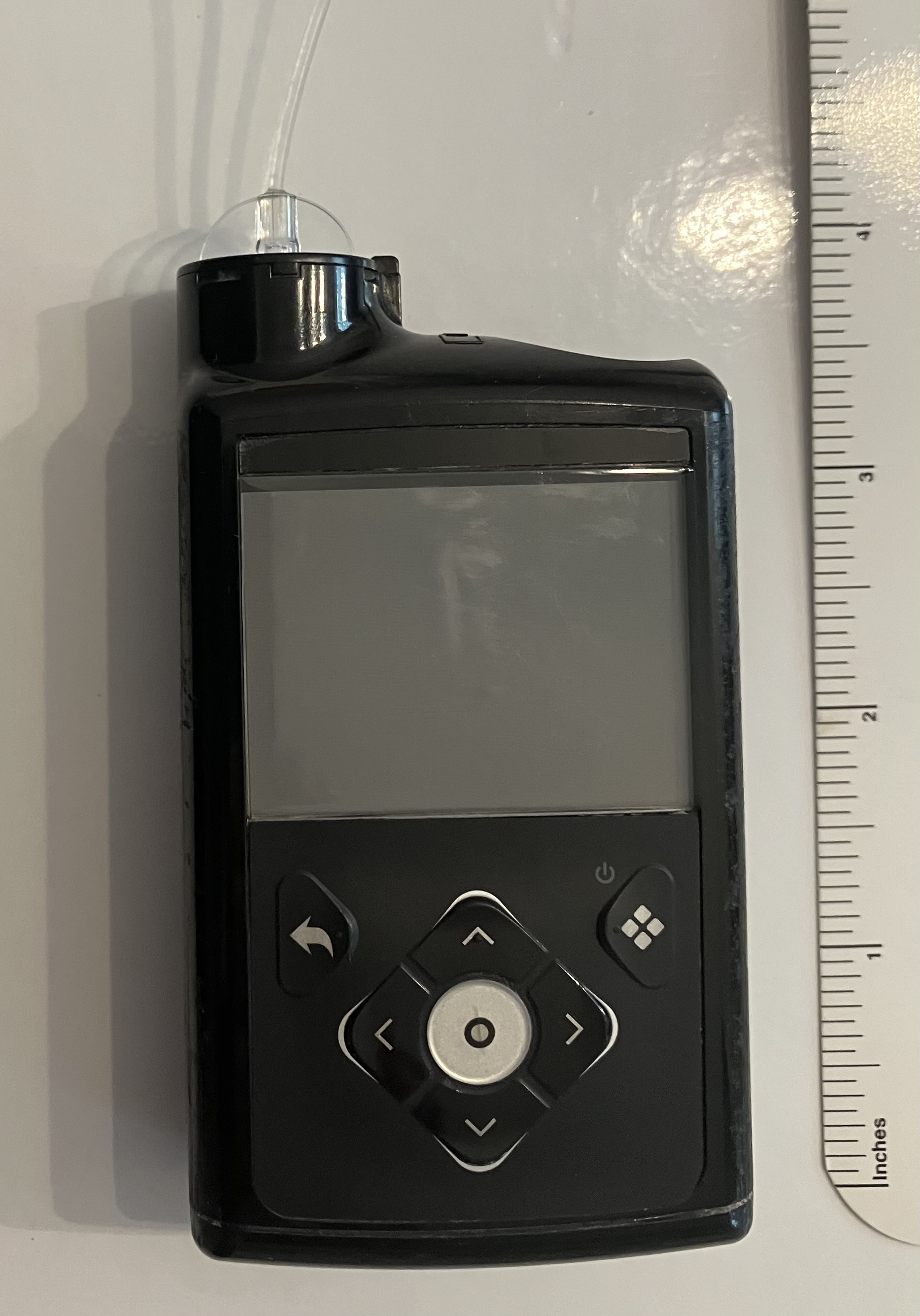
Medtronic Minimed 780G insulin pump

The MiniMed 780G is an insulin pump manufactured by Medtronic for patients with diabetes mellitus. The pump operates with a single AA battery and uses a piston-plunger pump to infuse a programmed amount of insulin into the patient through a length of tubing. The 780G uses a one-way wireless radio frequency link to receive blood sugar measurements from the patient's continuous glucose monitor. The 780G is capable of automated insulin delivery with a closed-loop control algorithm branded as SmartGuard.

== History ==
Medtronic replaced the Paradigm insulin pump with its new pump platform, the 640G, internationally in 2015. Its successive pumps have used the same form factor. In the United States, the 670G was released in 2017. It used an algorithm called SmartGuard to adjust the basal insulin rate based on readings from the CGM (continuous glucose monitor). A more advanced SmartGuard algorithm was released in 2020 (2023 in the United States) as part of the 780G. It can deliver automated boluses and has an optional glucose target of 100 mg/dl.

The 670G used Medtronic's own proprietary algorithm. For the 780G, the SmartGuard algorithm was adapted from an algorithm licensed by Medtronic in 2015 from medical technology company DreaMed. DreaMed, based at the Schneider Children's Medical Center of Israel in Tel Aviv, created the algorithm in the late 2000s. At first called MD-Logic Artificial Pancreas, then GlucoSitter, it used machine learning to increase the patient's time in the 80–120 mg/dl range. DreaMed's algorithm performed well in clinical trials as of 2011.

Initially, the pump was compatible only with MiniMed's own CGMs, the Guardian 3 and Guardian 4. In 2025, MiniMed introduced two new CGMs for the 780G, the Simplera Sync and the Instinct, made by Abbott Laboratories.

== Pump operation ==
The pump can operate in manual mode if certain parameters such as basal rates are programmed by the user. In automated mode, the SmartGuard algorithm requires a CGM to operate. Out of the box, the algorithm also requires a 48-hour warm-up period in manual mode to collect insulin usage data. The algorithm is based on historical trends of insulin doses such as total daily dose. Directly before entering automated mode, the algorithm requires a blood glucose reading from a meter to confirm the proper operation of the CGM.

The 780G algorithm adapts by updating itself to the individual user every night at midnight. The insulin delivery amount and timing of both automated basal rates and automated boluses are then precisely controlled by the controller. While in SmartGuard mode, the user can bolus for a meal, change the glucose target, and adjust the active insulin time.
