= Mean absolute relative difference =

Continuous glucose monitor accuracy measure

Mean Absolute Relative Difference (MARD) is a standard metric used to evaluate the accuracy of continuous glucose monitoring systems, which gives the average amount a CGM sensor reading varies from the actual blood glucose. It is calculated by taking the average of the absolute relative differences between the glucose readings reported by the CGM system and corresponding reference measurements, typically obtained through laboratory analysis or blood glucose meters. A lower MARD value indicates greater accuracy, and it is commonly used in clinical research and regulatory evaluations to compare the performance of different CGM devices. It is also of note that MARD percentages can vary by person, even while using the same device.

== MARD by device ==
Device	MARD	Release year	Notes
Dexcom STS	20.3%	2006	
Dexcom Seven	17%	2007	
Dexcom Seven Plus	16%	2010	
Dexcom G4 Platinum	13.9%	2012	
Dexcom G5 Mobile	9%	2015	
Dexcom G6	9%	2018	
Dexcom G7	8.2%	2022	
Dexcom G7 15-Day	8%	2024	
FreeStyle Libre 1	13.7%	2014	
FreeStyle Libre 2	9.3%	2020	
FreeStyle Libre 3	7.8%	2022	
