= Deltec Cozmo =

Insulin pump model

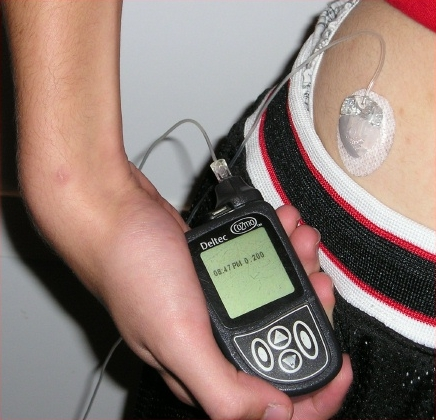
Pump, tubing, and catheter.

The Deltec Cozmo and CozMore were a series of insulin pumps made by Smiths Medical used to treat diabetes. In 2009, the company announced that it would to stop selling the Cozmo. The pump was used to deliver basal insulin continuously, and bolus insulin at meal times by pressing the buttons. The Deltec Cozmo used a 300 unit cartridge to store the insulin compared to the 200 unit cartridge of the current Animas Ping. The CozMore is a pump-meter combination consisting of a normal Cozmo insulin pump and a thin black meter that was placed over the back. The two devices connected through infrared signals. The two devices had separate power sources, but the meter could not function on its own as it displayed the information on the screen of the insulin pump.

Unlike the Animas Ping which has a locking feature that is undone by pressing both the up and down arrow buttons, the Deltec Cozmo had a number locking feature. The purpose of this feature was somewhat defeated by pump trainers encouraging the use of 14 as the code number. The Deltec Cozmo also used a different scrolling mechanism than the Animas Ping. On the Ping pump holding down the up or down button causes a change in one number then increments by five and on the Ping meter the numbers slowly climb to 5 then abruptly change speed, going from 5 to 110 in the same time it took to go from 0–5; on the Cozmo the scrolling speed slowly accelerated the longer the button was held down. This allowed the pumper to get to high values relatively fast and then still get to the exact value they wanted.

While it was still being sold, the Cozmo was marketed heavily towards young people, and included many features that made it easy for teenagers and preteens to use. It came in a variety of neon colors, including ice blue and purple, and allowed users to "name" their pumps.
