= Tandem Diabetes Care =

American diabetes-technology company

Tandem Diabetes Care, Inc.

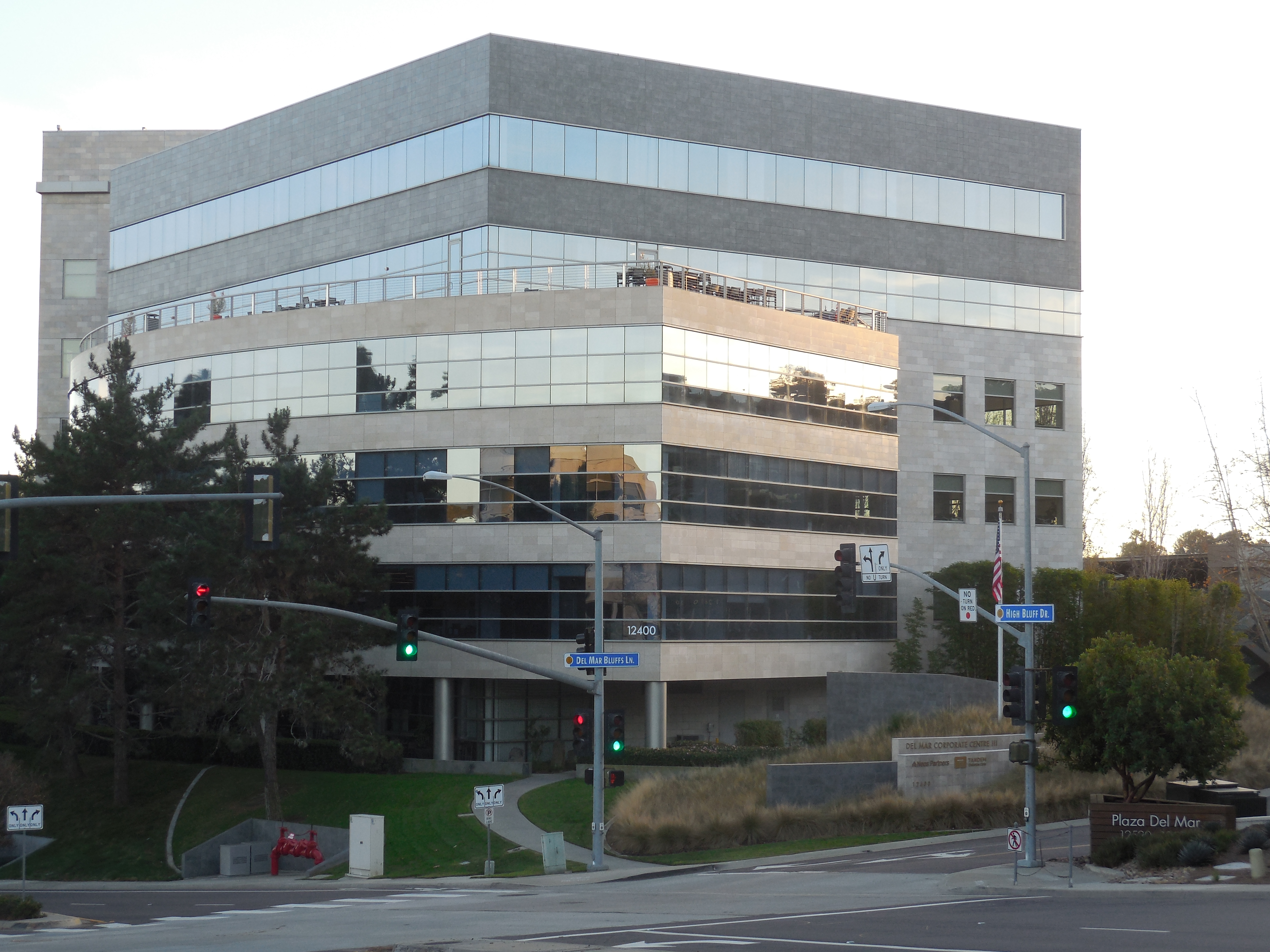
- Headquarters in San Diego
- Type: Public
- Traded as: Nasdaq: TNDM; S&P 600 component
- Industry: Medical devices
- Founded: 2006; 20 years ago in San Diego, California
- Headquarters: San Diego, California, United States
- Key people: Rebecca Robertson (chair); John F. Sheridan (president and CEO)
- Products: t:slim X2 insulin pump; Tandem Mobi insulin pump; Control-IQ+ technology; Tandem Source; Sugarmate
- Revenue: ▲US$1.015 billion (2025)
- Net income: ▼ −US$205 million (2025)
- Number of employees: 2,500 (2025)
- Website: tandemdiabetes.com

Tandem Diabetes Care, Inc. is an American medical-device company that develops and markets insulin pumps, automated insulin delivery systems and diabetes-management software. Headquartered in San Diego, California, its principal pump platforms are the t:slim X2 and Tandem Mobi, both of which use the company's Control-IQ+ software with compatible continuous glucose monitors (CGMs).

Tandem was founded in 2006 and introduced its first pump, the touchscreen t:slim, in 2012. The company became publicly traded on the Nasdaq in 2013. By the end of 2025 it reported an in-warranty user base of nearly 500,000 people in more than 25 countries and annual sales of $1.015 billion.

== History ==
The company was incorporated in January 2006 as Phluid, Inc. and changed its name to Tandem Diabetes Care in 2008. Former Biosite executive Kim Blickenstaff joined as president and chief executive officer in 2007. Its first product was designed following interviews with pump users and clinicians and used a color touchscreen rather than the button-based interfaces then common on insulin pumps.

The Food and Drug Administration (FDA) cleared the t:slim insulin-delivery system in November 2011, and Tandem began selling it in the United States the following year. In November 2013, Tandem sold eight million shares at $15 each in its initial public offering, raising approximately $108 million after costs.

Tandem began shipping the software-updatable t:slim X2 in 2016. The FDA subsequently authorized versions that displayed readings from the Dexcom G5 and G6 CGMs, and in 2019 classified the t:slim X2 as the first alternate controller enabled insulin pump, a category designed to support interoperable diabetes devices. John Sheridan, previously the company's chief operating officer, succeeded Blickenstaff as president and CEO in March 2019.

The company acquired the diabetes-data application Sugarmate in June 2020. It acquired infusion-set developer Capillary Biomedical for $24.7 million in July 2022 and Swiss patch-pump developer AMF Medical in January 2023. AMF had been developing Sigi, a rechargeable patch pump that used prefilled insulin cartridges; the product remained in development at the end of 2025.

== Products and software ==
=== t:slim X2 ===
The t:slim X2 is a rechargeable, touchscreen insulin pump with a 300-unit cartridge. It delivers programmed basal and bolus insulin through an infusion set and can receive software updates without replacement of the pump hardware. When used with a compatible CGM and Control-IQ technology, it can automatically adjust insulin delivery. The platform has supported integrations with Dexcom and FreeStyle Libre sensors in different markets.

The t:slim line replaced Tandem's earlier t:flex and t:slim G4 models. The t:slim G4, approved in 2015, combined a Tandem pump with the Dexcom G4 Platinum CGM display.

=== Tandem Mobi ===
The Tandem Mobi is a smaller durable pump intended to be worn on the body or carried in clothing. It uses a 200-unit cartridge and is operated principally from a compatible smartphone app, while a physical button can deliver a preset bolus. The FDA cleared the pump in July 2023, and Tandem began its full United States launch in February 2024. The company obtained a CE mark for Mobi in 2025 and subsequently began introducing it in European markets.

=== Automated insulin delivery ===
Tandem introduced Basal-IQ in 2018. The feature used predicted CGM values to suspend insulin delivery when glucose was expected to become low and resumed delivery when values recovered.

Control-IQ is a hybrid closed-loop system that uses CGM readings and a model-predictive algorithm to increase, decrease or suspend basal insulin and to deliver automatic correction boluses. Users still program personal therapy settings and normally announce meals. The FDA authorized Control-IQ through the De Novo pathway in December 2019, creating a regulatory category for interoperable automated glycemic controllers. Tandem launched it in the United States in January 2020 as a software update for compatible t:slim X2 pumps.

A revised version, Control-IQ+, broadened supported therapy settings and was cleared in 2025 for adults with type 2 diabetes who require insulin. In the United States, Control-IQ+ is used on both the t:slim X2 and Mobi platforms.

=== Data applications ===
The FDA cleared Tandem's t:connect desktop data-management application in 2013. A later mobile version displays pump and CGM information and, on compatible systems, permits bolus delivery from a phone. Tandem Source, introduced in the United States in 2023, is a web platform through which users and clinicians review therapy data. Sugarmate is a separate application for viewing CGM data and receiving customizable alerts.

== Clinical evidence ==
In a six-month randomized trial published in The New England Journal of Medicine in 2019, 168 people with type 1 diabetes were assigned either Control-IQ with a t:slim X2 and Dexcom G6 or a sensor-augmented pump. Mean time with glucose in the target range of 70–180 mg/dL rose from 61% to 71% in the Control-IQ group and remained about 59% in the control group, an adjusted difference of 11 percentage points, or 2.6 hours per day. No severe hypoglycemic events occurred; one participant using the closed-loop system developed diabetic ketoacidosis after an infusion-set failure. The trial was funded by the National Institute of Diabetes and Digestive and Kidney Diseases; Tandem supplied systems and technical support but, according to the publication, did not control the study design, conduct or analysis.

A 13-week randomized trial published in the same journal in 2025 enrolled 319 adults with insulin-treated type 2 diabetes. Time in the target range increased from 48% to 64% with Control-IQ, compared with 51% to 52% in a control group that continued its previous insulin method; the adjusted difference was 14 percentage points. Glycated hemoglobin fell by 0.9 percentage points in the automated-delivery group and by 0.4 points in the control group. One severe hypoglycemic event occurred in the automated-delivery group. The study was funded by Tandem.

== Recalls and safety corrections ==
In 2014, Tandem recalled selected lots of t:slim cartridges because leaks could cause too much or too little insulin to be delivered.

In 2024, the FDA classified a correction of version 2.7 of the iOS t:connect app as a Class I recall. Repeated app crashes and automatic relaunches could increase Bluetooth communication, drain a connected t:slim X2 battery and interrupt insulin delivery. The action covered 85,863 distributed app installations; the FDA reported 224 injuries and no deaths as of April 15, 2024. Tandem released updated app versions and advised users to monitor pump batteries.

In April 2025, the FDA classified a correction of Control-IQ+ software version 7.9 as a Class I recall. A defect affecting 85 pumps could incorrectly interpolate glucose values after gaps in CGM data and cause too much or too little insulin to be delivered. Tandem instructed affected users to turn off Control-IQ+ until the software was corrected.

Later in 2025, Tandem issued two further corrections that the FDA classified as Class I recalls. One covered 171,750 t:slim X2 pumps whose speakers could fail and stop insulin delivery; the company reported 59 injuries and no deaths. The other covered 17,745 Mobi pumps that could falsely detect vibration-motor failure and enter a non-operational state, stopping insulin delivery and CGM sessions. Tandem directed users to install corrected pump software.
