= Automated insulin delivery system =

System for people with diabetes

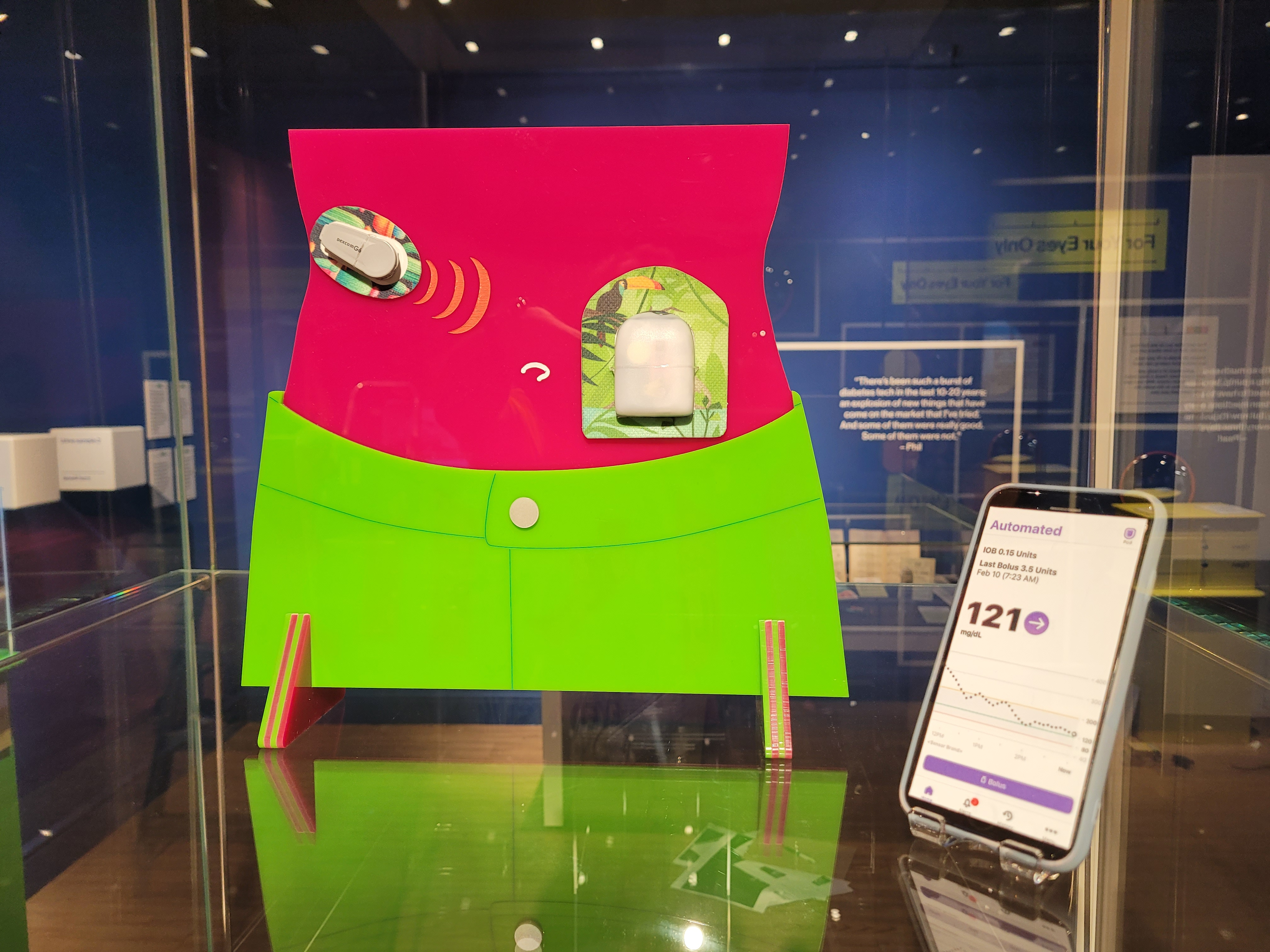
Display demonstrating an 'artificial pancreas' at Thackray Museum of Medicine

Automated insulin delivery systems are automated (or semi-automated) systems designed to assist people with insulin-requiring diabetes, by automatically adjusting insulin delivery in response to blood glucose levels. Currently available systems (as of October 2020) can only deliver (and regulate delivery of) a single hormone—insulin. Other systems currently in development aim to improve on current systems by adding one or more additional hormones that can be delivered as needed, providing something closer to the endocrine functionality of the pancreas.

The endocrine functionality of the pancreas is provided by islet cells which produce the hormones insulin and glucagon. Artificial pancreatic technology mimics the secretion of these hormones into the bloodstream in response to the body's changing blood glucose levels. Maintaining balanced blood sugar levels is crucial to the function of the brain, liver, and kidneys. Therefore, for people with diabetes, it is necessary that the levels be kept balanced when the body cannot produce insulin itself.

Automated insulin delivery (AID) systems are often referred to using the term artificial pancreas, but the term has no precise, universally accepted definition. For uses other than automated insulin delivery, see Artificial pancreas (disambiguation).

== General overview ==
=== History ===
The first automated insulin delivery system was known as the Biostator.

=== Classes of AID systems ===
Currently available AID systems fall into three broad classes based on their capabilities. The first systems released can only halt insulin delivery (predictive low glucose suspend) in response to already low or predicted low glucose. Hybrid Closed Loop systems can modulate delivery both up and down, although users still initiate insulin doses (boluses) for meals and typically "announce" or enter meal information. Fully Closed Loops require no manual insulin delivery actions or announcement for meals.

==== Predictive Low Glucose Suspend (PLGS) ====
A step forward from threshold suspend systems, predictive low glucose suspend (PLGS) systems use a mathematical model to extrapolate predicted future blood sugar levels based on recent past readings from a CGM. This allows the system to reduce or halt insulin delivery prior to a predicted hypoglycemic event.

==== Hybrid Closed Loop (HCL) / Advanced Hybrid Closed Loop (AHCL) ====
Hybrid closed loop (HCL) systems further expand on the capabilities of PLGS systems by adjusting basal insulin delivery rates both up and down in response to values from a continuous glucose monitor. Through this modulation of basal insulin, the system is able to reduce the magnitude and duration both hyperglycemic and hypoglycemic events. Users still must initiate manual mealtime boluses. Advanced hybrid closed loop systems have advanced algorithms.

Fully Closed Loop (FCL)

Fully or full closed loop (FCL) systems adjust insulin delivery in response to changes in glucose levels without requiring input by users for mealtime insulin or announcements of meals.

=== Required components ===
An automated insulin delivery system consists of three distinct components: a continuous glucose monitor to determine blood sugar levels, a pump to deliver insulin, and an algorithm that uses the data from the CGM and pump to determine needed insulin adjustments.

In the United States, the Food and Drug Administration (FDA) allows each component to be approved independently, allowing for more rapid approvals and incremental innovation.

==== Continuous glucose monitor (CGM) ====
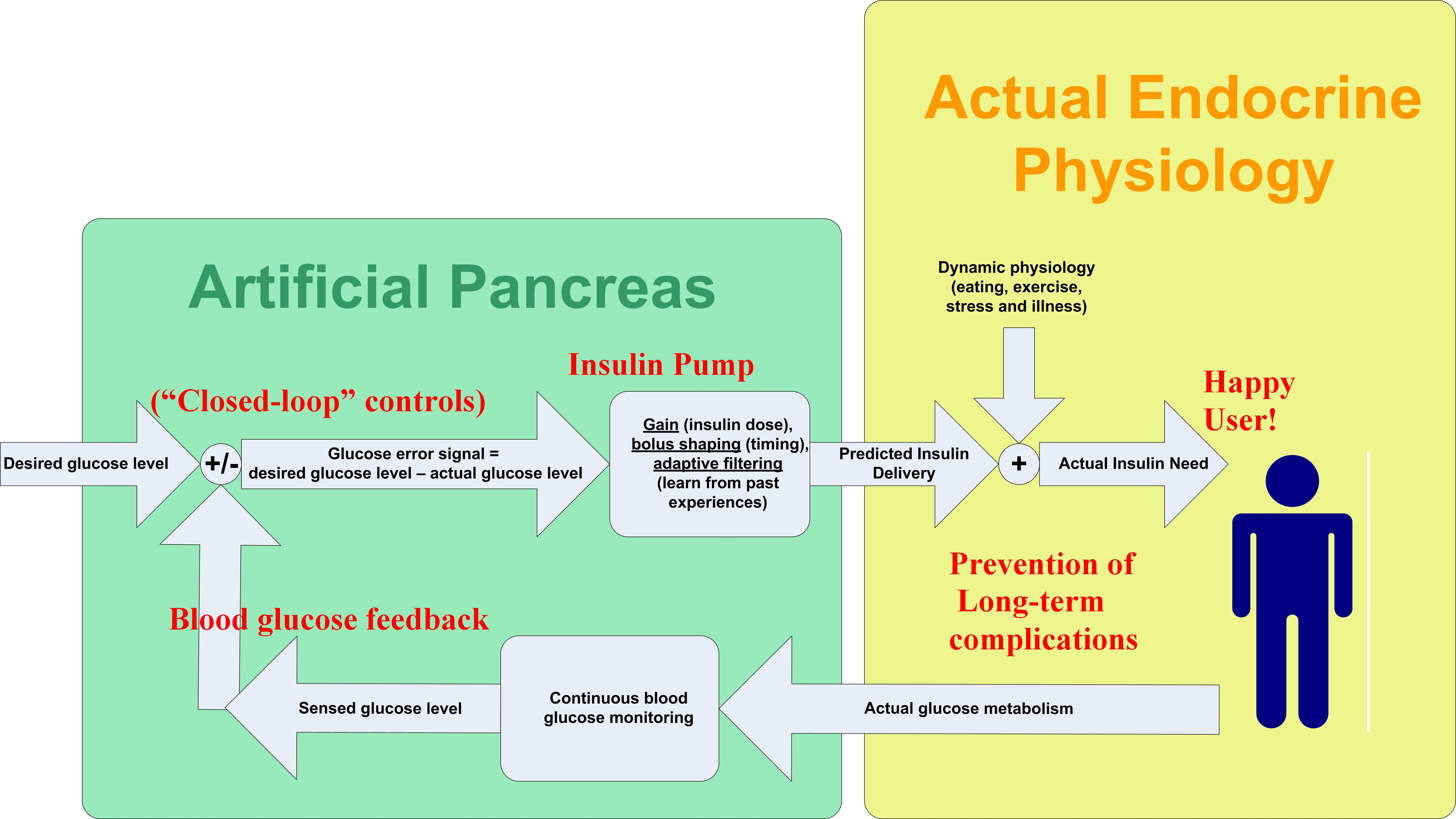
Artificial pancreas feedback system

Continuous glucose monitors (CGMs) are wearable sensors which extrapolate an estimate of the glucose concentration in a patient's blood based on the level of glucose present in the subcutaneous interstitial fluid. A thin, biocompatible sensor wire coated with a glucose-reactive enzyme is inserted into the skin, allowing the system to read the voltage generated, and based on it, estimate blood glucose. The biggest advantage of a CGM over a traditional fingerstick blood glucose meter is that the CGM can take a new reading as often as every 60 seconds (although most only take a reading every 5 minutes), allowing for a sampling frequency that is able to provide not just a current blood sugar level, but a record of past measurements; allowing computer systems to project past short-term trends into the future, showing patients where their blood sugar levels are likely headed.

==== Insulin pump ====
An insulin pump delivers insulin subcutaneously. The insulin pump body itself can also contain the algorithm used in an AID system, or it can connect via Bluetooth with a separate mobile device (such as a phone) to send data and receive commands to adjust insulin delivery.

Algorithm

The algorithm for each AID system differs. In commercial systems (see below), little is known about the details of how the control algorithm works. In open source systems, the code and algorithm are openly available. In general, all algorithms do the same basic functionality of taking in CGM data and based on predicted glucose level's and the user's personal settings (for basal rates, insulin sensitivity, and carbohydrate ratio, for example) then recommends insulin dosing to help bring or maintain glucose levels in target range.

Depending on the system, users may have the ability to adjust the target for the system, and may have different settings to ask the system to give more or less insulin in general.

== Currently available systems ==
=== Commercial ===
Commercial availability varies by country. Approved systems in various countries, described further below, include MiniMed 670G or 780G, Tandem's Control-IQ, Omnipod 5, CamAPS FX, and Diabeloop DBLG1.

==== MiniMed 670G ====
In September 2016, the FDA approved the Medtronic MiniMed 670G, which was the first approved hybrid closed loop system. The device automatically adjusts a patient's basal insulin delivery. It is made up of a continuous glucose monitor, an insulin pump, and a glucose meter for calibration. It automatically functions to modify the level of insulin delivery based on the detection of blood glucose levels by continuous monitor. It does this by sending the blood glucose data through an algorithm that analyzes and makes the subsequent adjustments. The system has two modes. Manual mode lets the user choose the rate at which basal insulin is delivered. Auto mode regulates basal insulin levels from the CGM readings every five minutes.

==== Tandem Diabetes Care t:Slim X2 with Control IQ ====
The Tandem Diabetes Care t:Slim X2 was approved by the U.S. Food and Drug Administration in 2019 and is the first insulin pump to be designated as an alternate controller enabled (ACE) insulin pump. ACE insulin pumps allow users to integrate continuous glucose monitors, automated insulin dosing (AID) systems, and other diabetes management devices with the pump to create a personalized diabetes therapy system. Many users of the t:slim X2 integrate the pump with the Dexcom G6, a continuous glucose monitor approved by the FDA in 2018. It was the first CGM authorized for use in an integrated therapy system. The device does not require fingerstick calibrations.

==== Insulet: Omnipod 5 ====
The first tubeless automated insulin delivery system, Omnipod 5 uses SmartAdjust technology to actively predict glucose levels up to 60 minutes ahead and adjust insulin delivery every 5 minutes—automatically increasing, decreasing, or pausing basal insulin—towards a user‑customizable glucose target. The system integrates with several continuous glucose monitors: Dexcom G6, Dexcom G7, and Freestyle Libre 2 Plus. Omnipod 5 is FDA‑cleared for people with type 1 diabetes aged 2 years and older, and adults with type 2 diabetes aged 18+. The Omnipod 5 became available through the NHS in the UK in 2023 in limited areas, and in 2024 the NHS announced the gradual rollout of Hybrid Closed Loop systems to all type 1 diabetes patients in England over the next 5 years, including the Omnipod 5.

==== iLet Bionic Pancreas ====
In May 2023, the FDA approved the iLet Bionic Pancreas system for people with Type 1 diabetes of six years and older. The device uses a closed-loop system to deliver both insulin and glucagon in response to sensed blood glucose levels. The 4th generation iLet prototype, presented in 2017, is around the size of an iPhone, with a touchscreen interface. It contains two chambers for both insulin and glucagon, and the device is configurable for use with only one hormone, or both. A 440-patient study of type I diabetes ran in 2020 and 2021 using a device configuration that delivered only insulin in comparison to standard of care; device use led to better circulating glucose control (measured by continuous monitoring) and a reduction in glycated hemoglobin (versus no change for the standard of care group). However, the incidence of severe hypoglycemic events was more than 1.5 times higher among device users versus standard care patients.

=== Non-commercial ===
There are several non-commercial, non-FDA approved DIY options, using open source code exist. These include, but are not limited to OpenAPS, Loop (iOS only), AndroidAPS (Android only), and Trio (iOS only).

== Systems in development ==
=== Luna Diabetes ===
Former founders of Timesulin, Welldoc, Companion Medical and Bigfoot Biomedical have joined together to create the world's first automated insulin delivery system for those that want to continue to use insulin pens. The team is calling it Episodic AID.

The working product name is Luna.

=== Inreda AP ===
In collaboration with the Academic Medical Center in Amsterdam, Inreda Diabetic B.V. has developed a closed loop system with insulin and glucagon. The initiator, Robin Koops, started to develop the device in 2004 and ran the first tests on himself. In October 2016 Inreda Diabetic B.V. got the ISO 13485 license, a first requirement to produce its artificial pancreas. The product itself is called Inreda AP, and soon made some highly successful trials. After clinical trials, it received the CE marking, noting that it complies with European regulation, in February 2020.

In October 2020 the health insurance company Menzis and Inreda Diabetic then started a pilot with 100 patients insured by Menzis. These are all patients that face very serious trouble in regulating their blood glucose levels. They now use the Inreda AP instead of the traditional treatment. Another large scale trial with the Inreda AP was set up in July 2021, and should determine whether Dutch health insurance should cover the device for all their insured. A smaller improved version of the Inreda AP is scheduled for release in 2023.

== Approaches ==
=== Medical equipment ===
The medical equipment approach involves combining a continuous glucose monitor and an implanted insulin pump that can function together with a computer-controlled algorithm to replace the normal function of the pancreas. The development of continuous glucose monitors has led to the progress in artificial pancreas technology using this integrated system.

==== Closed-loop systems ====
Unlike the continuous sensor alone, the closed-loop system requires no user input in response to reading from the monitor; the monitor and insulin pump system automatically delivers the correct amount of hormone calculated from the readings transmitted. The system is what makes up the artificial pancreas device.

===== Current studies =====
Four studies on different artificial pancreas systems are being conducted starting in 2017 and going into the near future. The projects are funded by the National Institute of Diabetes and Digestive and Kidney Diseases, and are the final part of testing the devices before applying for approval for use. Participants in the studies are able to live their lives at home while using the devices and being monitored remotely for safety, efficacy, and a number of other factors.

The International Diabetes Closed-Loop trial, led by researchers from the University of Virginia, is testing a closed-loop system called inControl, which has a smartphone user interface. 240 people of ages 14 and up are participating for 6 months.

A full-year trial led by researchers from the University of Cambridge started in May 2017 and has enrolled an estimated 150 participants of ages 6 to 18 years. The artificial pancreas system being studied uses a smartphone and has a low glucose feature to improve glucose level control.

The International Diabetes Center in Minneapolis, Minnesota, in collaboration with Schneider Children's Medical Center of Israel, are planning a 6-month study that will begin in early 2019 and will involve 112 adolescents and young adults, ages 14 to 30. The main object of the study is to compare the current Medtronic 670G system to a new Medtronic-developed system. The new system has programming that aims to improve glucose control around mealtime, which is still a big challenge in the field.

The current 6-month study led by the Bionic Pancreas team started in mid-2018 and enrolled 312 participants of ages 18 and above.

=== Physiological ===
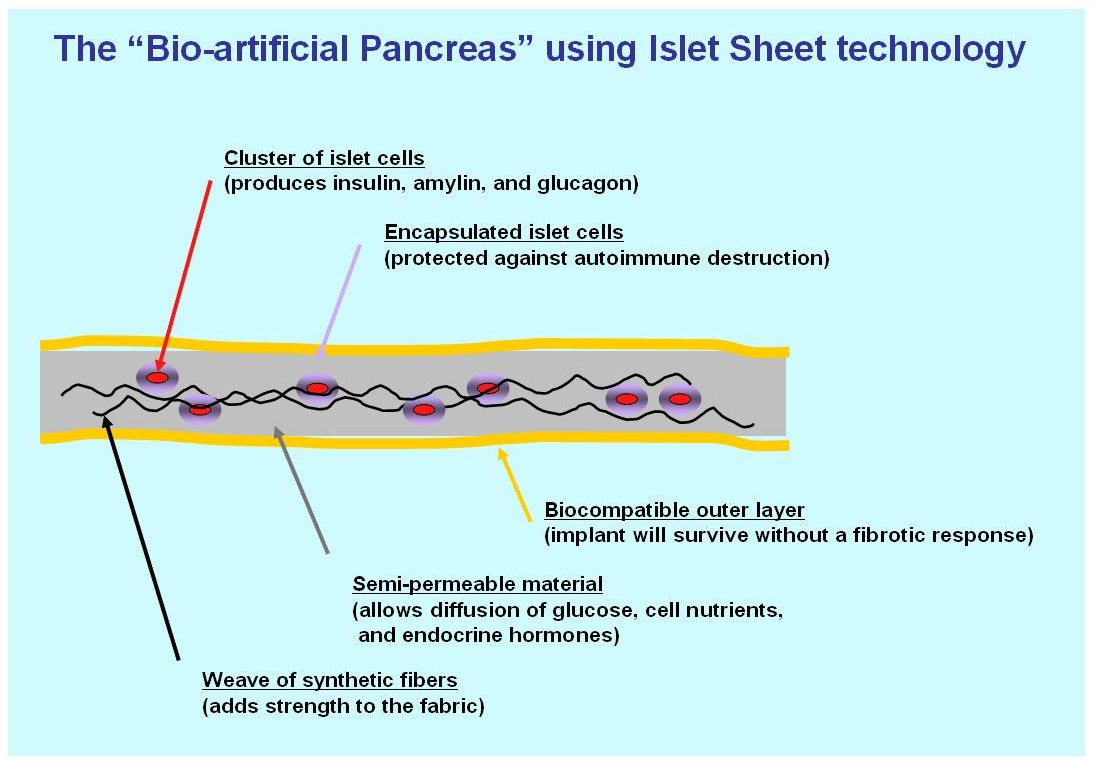
The Bio-artificial pancreas: this diagram shows a cross section of bio-engineered tissue with encapsulated islet cells which deliver endocrine hormones in response to glucose.

The biotechnical company Defymed, based in France, is developing an implantable bio-artificial device called MailPan which features a bio-compatible membrane with selective permeability to encapsulate different cell types, including pancreatic beta cells. The implantation of the device does not require conjunctive immuno-suppressive therapy because the membrane prevents antibodies of the patient from entering the device and damaging the encapsulated cells. After being surgically implanted, the membrane sheet will be viable for years. The cells that the device holds can be produced from stem cells rather than human donors, and may also be replaced over time using input and output connections without surgery. Defymed is partially funded by JDRF, formerly known as the Juvenile Diabetes Research Foundation, but is now defined as an organization for all ages and all stages of type 1 diabetes.

In November 2018, it was announced that Defymed would partner with the Israel-based Kadimastem, a bio-pharmaceutical company developing stem-cell based regenerative therapies, to receive a two-year grant worth approximately $1.47 million for the development of a bio-artificial pancreas that would treat type 1 diabetes. Kadimastem's stem cell technology uses differentiation of human embryonic stem cells to obtain pancreatic endocrine cells. These include insulin-producing beta cells, as well as alpha cells, which produce glucagon. Both cells arrange in islet-like clusters, mimicking the structure of the pancreas. The aim of the partnership is to combine both technologies in a bio-artificial pancreas device, which releases insulin in response to blood glucose levels, to bring to clinical trial stages.

The San Diego, California based biotech company ViaCyte has also developed a product aiming to provide a solution for type 1 diabetes which uses an encapsulation device made of a semi-permeable immune reaction-protective membrane. The device contains pancreatic progenitor cells that have been differentiated from embryonic stem cells. After surgical implantation in an outpatient procedure, the cells mature into endocrine cells which arrange in islet-like clusters and mimic the function of the pancreas, producing insulin and glucagon. The technology advanced from pre-clinical studies to FDA approval for phase 1 clinical trials in 2014, and presented two-year data from the trial in June 2018. They reported that their product, called PEC-Encap, has so far been safe and well tolerated in patients at a dose below therapeutic levels. The encapsulated cells were able to survive and mature after implantation, and immune system rejection was decreased due to the protective membrane. The second phase of the trial will evaluate the efficacy of the product. ViaCyte has also been receiving financial support from JDRF on this project.

== Initiatives around the globe ==
In the United States in 2006, JDRF (formerly the Juvenile Diabetes Research Foundation) launched a multi-year initiative to help accelerate the development, regulatory approval, and acceptance of continuous glucose monitoring and artificial pancreas technology.

Grassroots efforts to create and commercialize a fully automated artificial pancreas system have also arisen directly from patient advocates and the diabetes community.

In April 2024, the NHS announced it would, over the next five years, offer use of a Hybrid Closed Loop system to Type 1 diabetes patients in England.
